= Nimoa Island =

Island in the Louisiade Archipelago, Milne Bay Province, Papua New Guinea

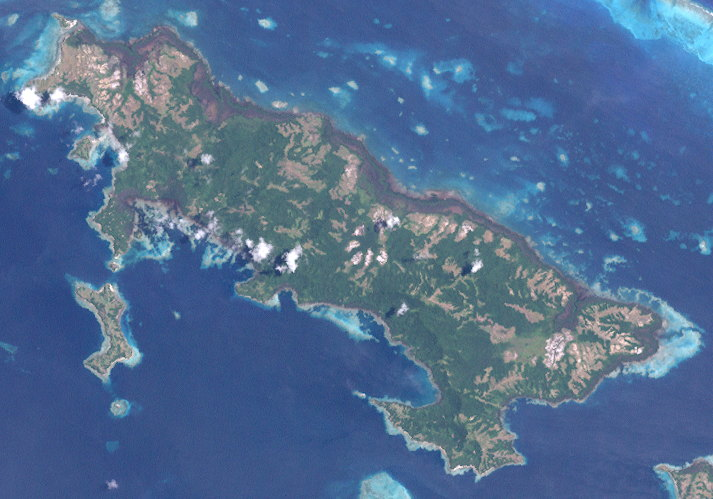
- The island of Pana Tinani. Nimoa is in the bottom right corner of the image.

- Location within Papua New Guinea

Geography
- Location: Oceania
- Coordinates: 11°18′48″S 153°15′32″E
- Archipelago: Louisiade Archipelago
- Adjacent to: Solomon Sea
- Total islands: 1
- Major islands: Nimoa
- Area: 3.56 km^{2} (1.37 sq mi)
- Highest elevation: 140 m (460 ft)
- Highest point: Mount Nimoa

Administration
- Papua New Guinea
- Province: Milne Bay
- District: Samarai-Murua District
- LLG: Yaleyamba Rural Local Level Government Area
- Island Group: Pana Tinani Group
- Largest settlement: Soluwo (pop. ~150)

Demographics
- Population: 400 (2014)
- Pop. density: 111/km^{2} (287/sq mi)
- Ethnic groups: Papuans, Austronesians, Melanesians.

Additional information
- Time zone: AEST (UTC+10)
- ISO code: PG-MBA
- Official website: www.ncdc.gov.pg

Nimoa Island is an island in the Louisiade Archipelago in Milne Bay Province, Papua New Guinea.

== Geography ==
The island has an area of 3.56 km^{2}, it is part of the Pana Tinani Group. The island is hilly, rising to 140 m at Mt. Nimoa. The island is 1.7 km north of Vanatinai, and separated from it with the Bulami Channel.

== History ==
The island was discovered in the late 18th century.

== Population ==
At the census of population in 2014, the island had 395 inhabitants, spread across 5 small villages. The main town is Soluwo, located on the southwest point.
