= Yeina Island =

Island in Papua New Guinea

Nickname: Piron Island
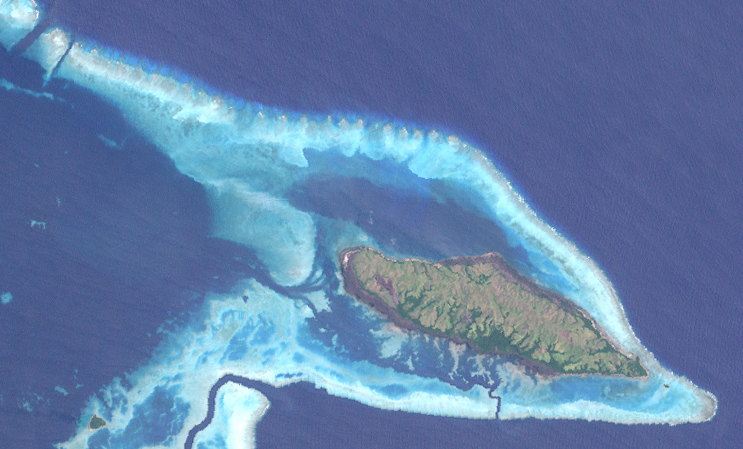
- Yeina island. Meiwa island is in the right corner.

- Location within Papua New Guinea

Geography
- Location: Oceania
- Coordinates: 11°19′48″S 153°26′30″E
- Archipelago: Louisiade Archipelago
- Adjacent to: Solomon Sea
- Total islands: 1
- Major islands: Yeina; Meiwa
- Area: 16 km^{2} (6.2 sq mi)
- Length: 9.5 km (5.9 mi)
- Width: 3.2 km (1.99 mi)
- Highest elevation: 80 m (260 ft)
- Highest point: Mount Yeina

Administration
- Papua New Guinea
- Province: Milne Bay
- District: Samarai-Murua District
- LLG: Yaleyamba Rural Local Level Government Area
- Island Group: Yeina Group
- Largest settlement: Buwo (pop. ~250)

Demographics
- Population: 437 (2014)
- Pop. density: 27.3/km^{2} (70.7/sq mi)
- Ethnic groups: Papauans, Austronesians, Melanesians.

Additional information
- Time zone: AEST (UTC+10)
- ISO code: PG-MBA
- Official website: www.ncdc.gov.pg

Yeina Island (also known as Veina and Piron Island) an is an island of volcanic origin in the Southeast Louisiade Archipelago in Milne Bay Province, Papua New Guinea.

== Geography ==
The island has an area of 16 km^{2}. The island is hilly, rising to 80 m at Mt. Yeina. The island is 10 km north of Vanatinai, and separated from it with the Yuma Channel. It is also 10 km east of Pana Tinani. The island is circled by a coral reef. Its nterior is dominated by a chain of low, grassy hill, surrounded by a coastal forest, with many mangrove areas. Between Yeina and Tagula is the Marx Reef.

== History ==
The island was discovered in the late 18th century.

== Population ==
At the census of population in 2014, the island had 437 inhabitants, spread across 4 villages. The main town is Buwo, on the West coast. Former town of Kabagi-bagi was damaged by hurricanes recently. Nearly entire island population have moved to the village of Buwo.
