= East Deboyne Islands =

Island group in Papua New Guinea

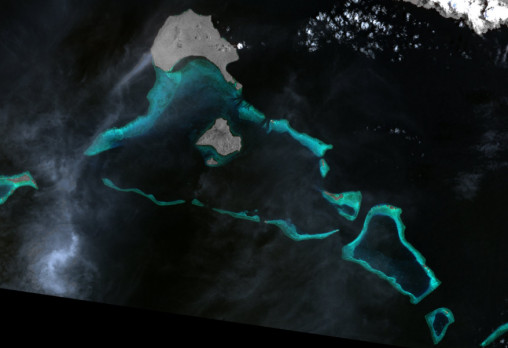

- Location within Papua New Guinea

Geography
- Location: Oceania
- Coordinates: 10°51′S 152°32′E
- Archipelago: Louisiade Archipelago
- Adjacent to: Solomon Sea
- Total islands: 8
- Major islands: Redlick Islets; Pana Sagusagu
- Area: 1.02 km^{2} (0.39 sq mi)
- Highest elevation: 37 m (121 ft)
- Highest point: Mount Pana Sagusagu

Administration
- Papua New Guinea
- Province: Milne Bay
- District: Samarai-Murua District
- LLG: Louisiade Rural Local Level Government Area
- Island Group: Deboyne Islands
- Largest settlement: Redlick Islets

Demographics
- Population: 0 (2014)
- Pop. density: 0/km^{2} (0/sq mi)
- Ethnic groups: Papauans, Austronesians, Melanesians.

Additional information
- Time zone: AEST (UTC+10)
- ISO code: PG-MBA
- Official website: www.ncdc.gov.pg

The East Deboyne Islands are a group of scattered island and reefs between the Deboyne Islands and the Renard Islands, in the north of the Louisiade Archipelago, Papua New Guinea. Panaeati Islanders have a Copra plantation on Mabui island.

== Geography ==
They are located 10 km (6 mi) from Deboyne Islands .

== History ==
The islands were discovered in 1793 by Antoine Bruni d'Entrecasteaux.
