= Iyen Island =

Island in Papua New Guinea

Nickname: Ian Island
- Location within Papua New Guinea

Geography
- Location: Oceania
- Coordinates: 11°30′S 153°26′E
- Archipelago: Louisiade Archipelago
- Adjacent to: Solomon Sea
- Total islands: 1
- Major islands: Iyen
- Area: 0.86 km^{2} (0.33 sq mi)
- Highest elevation: 54 m (177 ft)
- Highest point: Mount Iyen

Administration
- Papua New Guinea
- Province: Milne Bay
- District: Samarai-Murua District
- LLG: Yaleyamba Rural Local Level Government Area
- Island Group: Vanatinai Islands
- Largest settlement: Iyen (pop. ~95)

Demographics
- Population: 102 (2014)
- Pop. density: 119/km^{2} (308/sq mi)
- Ethnic groups: Papauans, Austronesians, Melanesians.

Additional information
- Time zone: AEST (UTC+10)
- ISO code: PG-MBA
- Official website: www.ncdc.gov.pg

Iyen Island is in the Louisiade Archipelago, within Milne Bay Province of southeastern Papua New Guinea.

It is jurisdictionally in the Yaleyamba Rural Local Level Government Area.
