= Wanim Island =

Island in Papua New Guinea

Nickname: Grass Island
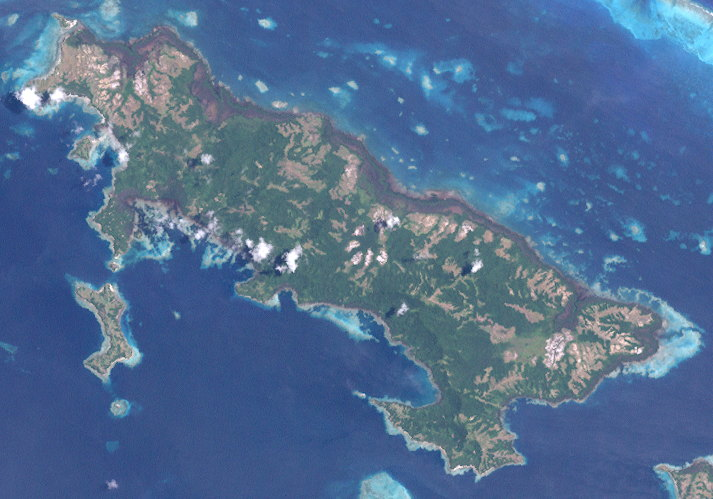
- The island of Pana Tinani. Wanim is in the center-left section of the image.

- Location within Papua New Guinea

Geography
- Location: Oceania
- Coordinates: 11°15′48″S 153°15′32″E
- Archipelago: Louisiade Archipelago
- Adjacent to: Solomon Sea
- Total islands: 1
- Major islands: Wanim
- Area: 1.66 km^{2} (0.64 sq mi)
- Highest elevation: 119 m (390 ft)
- Highest point: Mount Wanim

Administration
- Papua New Guinea
- Province: Milne Bay
- District: Samarai-Murua District
- LLG: Yaleyamba Rural Local Level Government Area
- Island Group: Pana Tinani Group
- Largest settlement: Bunbun (pop. ~450)

Demographics
- Population: 600 (2014)
- Pop. density: 361/km^{2} (935/sq mi)
- Ethnic groups: Papauans, Austronesians, Melanesians.

Additional information
- Time zone: AEST (UTC+10)
- ISO code: PG-MBA
- Official website: www.ncdc.gov.pg

Wanim Island is an island in the Louisiade Archipelago in Milne Bay Province, Papua New Guinea.

== Geography ==
The island has an area of 3.56 km^{2} and is part of the Pana Tinani Group. The island is hilly, rising to 119 m at Mt. Wanim. The island is 0.9 km south of Pana Tinani and separated from it by the Bulami Channel.

== History ==
The island was discovered in the late 18th century.

== Population ==
At the census of population in 2014, the island had 600 inhabitants, spread across 3 small villages. The main town is Bunbun, located on the northwest point.
