= Duperre Islands =

Atoll in Papua New Guinea

Bramble Haven
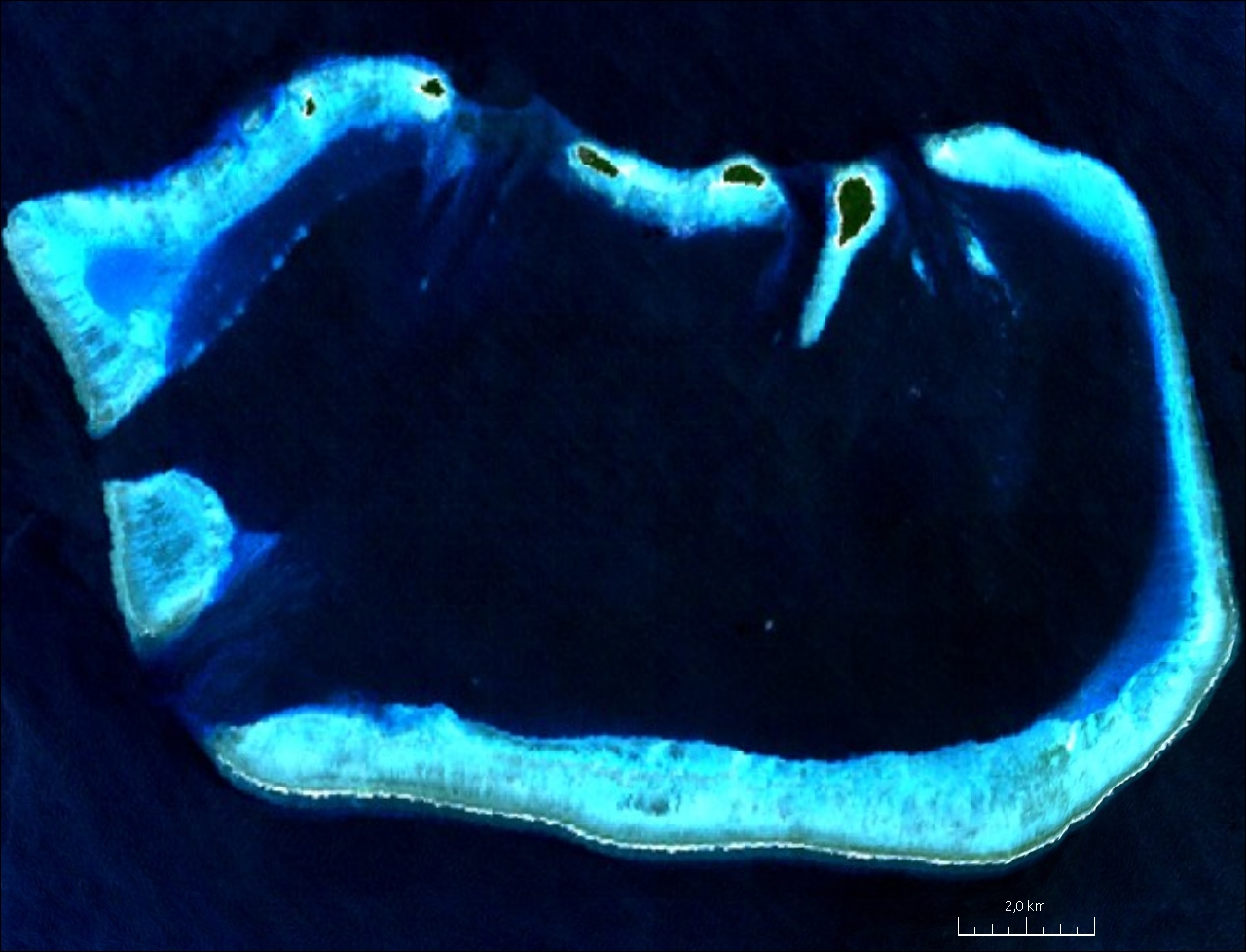
- NASA-Satellite

- Location within Papua New Guinea

Geography
- Location: Oceania
- Coordinates: 11°14′00″S 152°00′00″E
- Archipelago: Louisiade Archipelago
- Adjacent to: Solomon Sea
- Total islands: 5, with 1 inhabited
- Major islands: Punawan; Duperre; Siva; Panapwa; Awanagamwana
- Area: 0.82 km^{2} (0.32 sq mi)
- Length: 19.5 km (12.12 mi)
- Width: 11 km (6.8 mi)

Administration
- Papua New Guinea
- Province: Milne Bay
- District: Samarai-Murua District
- LLG: Louisiade Rural Local Level Government Area
- Island Group: Duperre Islands
- Largest settlement: Punawan (pop. 10)
- lagoon area
- Area covered: 110 km^{2} (42 sq mi; 13414.6%)
- total area
- Area covered: 175 km^{2} (68 sq mi; 21341.5%)

Demographics
- Population: 10 (2014)
- Ethnic groups: Papauans, Austronesians, Melanesians.

Additional information
- Time zone: AEST (UTC+10)
- ISO code: PG-MBA
- Official website: www.ncdc.gov.pg

Bramble Haven is an atoll in the Louisiade Archipelago. Its islands on the northern section are grouped as the Duperre Islands, named after the French admiral Victor Duperré.

== Administration ==
it belongs to Milne Bay Province in the southeastern part of Papua New Guinea .

== Geography ==
Bramble Haven is the eastern part of a large chain of atolls, reefs and islands that extends from the western side of the barrier reef of Vanatinai for a length of 400 km to the west, extending to the south coast of Papua peninsula.

Bramble Haven is located 5 km east of Long Reef and 9 km west of the Jomard Channel. Between Bramble Haven and Vanatinai are the small archipelago of Jomard Islands. Bramble Haven is a small, 17 km wide and 11 km long, atoll-like formation. The five most important reefs are concentrated around a rectangular lagoon. The reefs are wide and submerged. The reefs in the northern part of Bramble Haven have five small islands, which are also called Duperré Islands: Punawan (51 ha ), the small Duperre Island, Siva, and Panapwa Awanagamwana.

Bramble Haven stands since 2006 in the category "Mixed objects" that combines both criteria of the cultural and natural heritage, together with the Conflict Group, the Jomard Islands and Samarai and Lunn Island under the name: Milne Bay Seascape (Pacific Jewels of Marine Biodiversity) on the Tentative list of Papua New Guinea for the list in the world heritage of UNESCO .

== History ==
The atoll was named after a Schooner called Bramble Haven shipping in the area on August 5, 1846, have crashed on the reefs. Captain Charles B. Yule, the crew, and scientist Owen Stanley have all perished.

The island is briefly described by Alan Villiers at several places in "The Coral Sea"

This is totally wrong. The Bramble was a tender to HMS Rattlesnake on which Owen Stanley was captain. The Bramble did not sink, and no one was killed. Captain Stanley died in Australia after falling ill during his survey of this (and other nearby) atolls. The Bramble was able to enter the lagoon of this atoll and freely navigate. That is how it became known as Bramble Haven.

== Population ==
The population of the islands speak Misima-Paneati language. The language belongs to Western Oceanic languages group. Only Punawan island is inhabited, although most of its villagers usually reside on Utian island through the year. The Utian islanders have many gardens for yams, coconuts, and brought cattle to ranch in the island.
