= Lunn Island =

Island in Papua New Guinea

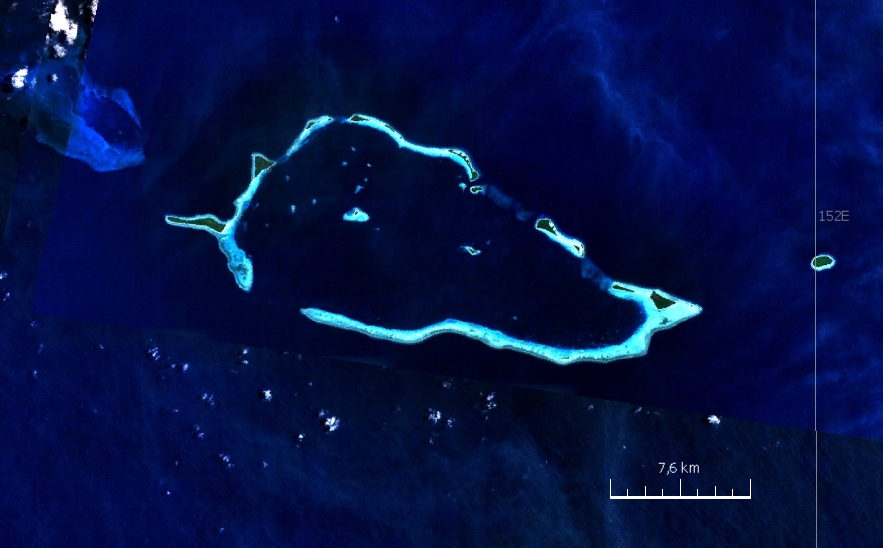
- Satellite image

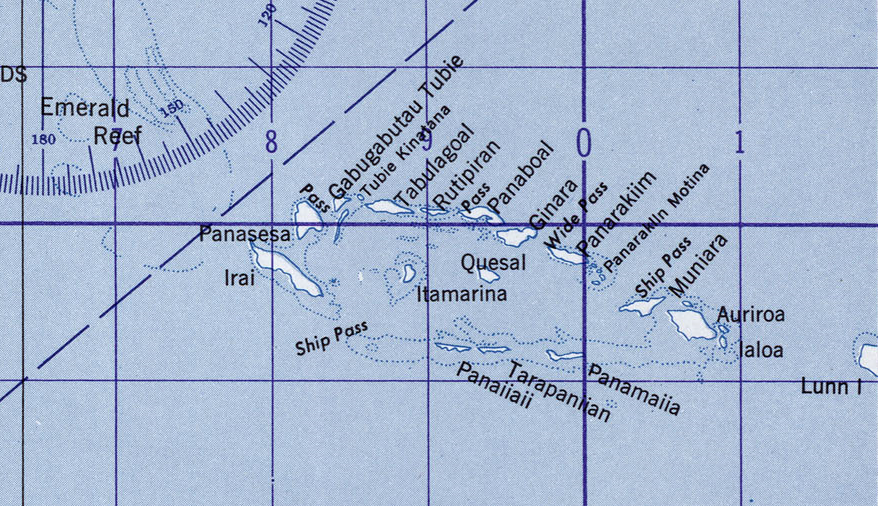

- Location within Papua New Guinea

Geography
- Location: Oceania
- Coordinates: 10°47′13″S 152°0′8″E
- Archipelago: Louisiade Archipelago
- Adjacent to: Solomon Sea
- Total islands: 1
- Major islands: Lunn
- Area: 0.51 km^{2} (0.20 sq mi)
- Length: 1.15 km (0.715 mi)
- Width: 0.55 km (0.342 mi)

Administration
- Papua New Guinea
- Province: Milne Bay
- District: Samarai-Murua District
- LLG: Bwanabwana Rural LLG
- Ward: Conflict Group

Demographics
- Population: 0 (2014)
- Pop. density: 0/km^{2} (0/sq mi)
- Ethnic groups: Papauans, Austronesians, Melanesians.

Additional information
- Time zone: AEST (UTC+10)
- ISO code: PG-MBA
- Official website: www.ncdc.gov.pg

Lunn Island is a solitary island of Papua New Guinea in the Solomon Sea, belonging to the Louisiade Archipelago. It belongs to Milne Bay Province, to the ward of Conflict Group and is located between the Engineer Group, which is 8.3 kilometres (5.2 miles) to the west, and the Torlesse Islands, which are 18.3 kilometres (11.4 miles) to the east. The Deboyne Islands are another 22 kilometres (14 miles) eastward.

Lunn Island is uninhabited, densely wooded and has a land area of 51 hectares (130 acres). It is 1.14 kilometres (1,250 yards) long and up to 550 metres (600 yards) wide.
