= Anagusa =

Island in Papua New Guinea

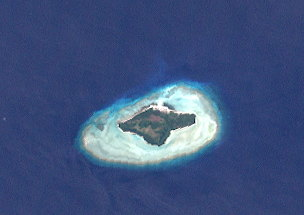

- Location within Papua New Guinea

Geography
- Location: Oceania
- Coordinates: 10°42′48″S 151°14′32″E
- Archipelago: Louisiade Archipelago
- Adjacent to: Solomon Sea
- Total islands: 2 inhabited on Bentley Group
- Major islands: Anagusa; Nare
- Area: 1.42 km^{2} (0.55 sq mi)
- Length: 2.2 km (1.37 mi)
- Width: 1.1 km (0.68 mi)
- Highest elevation: 10 m (30 ft)
- Highest point: Mount Anagusa

Administration
- Papua New Guinea
- Province: Milne Bay
- District: Samarai-Murua District
- LLG: Bwanabwana Rural Local Level Government Area
- Island Group: Bentley Islands
- Largest settlement: Anagusa (pop. ~70)

Demographics
- Population: 112 (2014)
- Pop. density: 78.8/km^{2} (204.1/sq mi)
- Ethnic groups: Papuans, Austronesians, Melanesians.

Additional information
- Time zone: AEST (UTC+10)
- ISO code: PG-MBA
- Official website: www.ncdc.gov.pg

Anagusa is an island, part of the Bentley Group, in Louisiade Archipelago in the southeastern part of Papua New Guinea. For 2014 census, the island had a village of 122 residents in 21 households, although at least 1 family lives in nearby island of Nare.

== Geography ==
Anagusa is located 10 km south of the Engineer Islands. It was settled by migrants from Normanby and Wari islands. The style of the Anagusa pottery is similar to those of the people of Wari. The population consists of fishermen and farmers. The closest island is Nare (Mudge) Island 6.8 km south-east.

The inhabitants of the island speak Bwanabwana.

Administratively, the island belongs to Bwanabwana Rural LLG (Local Level Government area) of the Samarai-Murua District in Milne Bay Province.
