= Panniet naked-backed fruit bat =

Conservation status
- Near Threatened (IUCN 3.1)

Scientific classification
- Kingdom: Animalia
- Phylum: Chordata
- Class: Mammalia
- Order: Chiroptera
- Family: Pteropodidae
- Genus: Dobsonia
- Species: D. pannietensis

Binomial name
- Dobsonia pannietensis De Vis, 1905
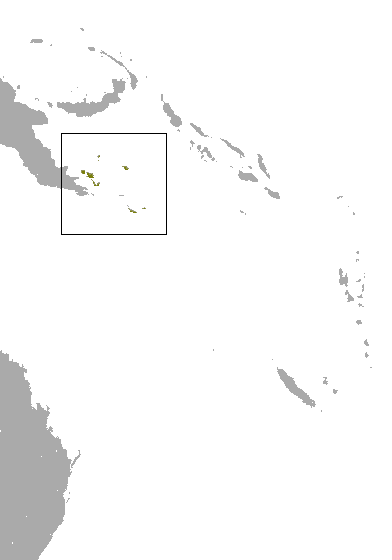
- Panniet naked-backed fruit bat range in Papua New Guinea

Synonyms
- Dobsonia pannietensis remota (Cabrera, 1920)

Species of bat

The Panniet naked-backed fruit bat (Dobsonia pannietensis), also known as the De Vis's Bare-backed Fruit Bat and Panaeati Bare-backed Fruit Bat, is a species of megabat in the family Pteropodidae. It roosts in groups, within caves and tree hollows.

== Distribution and status ==
The bat is endemic to the Louisiade Archipelago, D'Entrecasteaux Islands archipelago, and Trobriand Islands, within Milne Bay Province of southeastern Papua New Guinea. It is found at elevations from sea level to 1,800 metres (5,900 ft).

It has been recorded from Fergusson Island, Goodenough Island, Normanby Island, Misima Island, Panaeati Island, Rossel Island, Tagula Island (Sudest island), Kiriwina island, and Woodlark Islands.

It is listed on the IUCN Red List as a Near threatened species.

== See also ==
- Bats of Oceania
- Endemic fauna of Papua New Guinea
