= Renard Islands =

Islands in Papua New Guinea

- Location within Papua New Guinea

Geography
- Location: Oceania
- Coordinates: 10°49′48″S 153°00′00″E
- Archipelago: Louisiade Archipelago
- Adjacent to: Solomon Sea
- Total islands: 6
- Major islands: Kimuta; Niva Beno Island; Oreia
- Area: 4.3 km^{2} (1.7 sq mi)
- Highest elevation: 84 m (276 ft)
- Highest point: Mount Kimuta

Administration
- Papua New Guinea
- Province: Milne Bay
- District: Samarai-Murua District
- LLG: Louisiade Rural Local Level Government Area
- Island Group: Renard Islands
- Largest settlement: Awa (pop. ~330)

Demographics
- Population: 617 (2014)
- Pop. density: 143.5/km^{2} (371.7/sq mi)
- Ethnic groups: Papauans, Austronesians, Melanesians.

Additional information
- Time zone: AEST (UTC+10)
- ISO code: PG-MBA
- Official website: www.ncdc.gov.pg

The Renard Islands are an archipelago in the Solomon Sea . Administratively they belong to Milne Bay Province in the southeastern region of Papua New Guinea.

== History ==
The islands were encountered by the French explorer Antoine Bruni d'Entrecasteaux on 13 June 1793 and he named them îles Renard.

American artillery batteries were placed on the islands during World War II.

== Geography ==
The Renard Islands are located in the north of Louisiade Archipelago, 21 km (13 mi) north of the barrier reef of Vanatinai and 19 km (12 mi) southeast of Misima. The small Manuga Reef, which is located 19 km southeast of Renard Islands, is part of the Renard Ward. The Renard Islands are located on a 21 by 6 km (13 by 3.7 mi) wide sandbank in a rectangular shape. The largest islands in the group are Kimuta (286 ha; 710 acres), Niva Beno (49 ha; 120 acres) and Oreia (47 ha; 120 acres). Kimuta Island is 5.9 kilometers (3.7 mi) long, with widths averaging at 550 meters (1,800 ft). The hilly island rises up to 84 meters (276 ft) above the sea level. The islands of Niva Beno and Topuna are lying east of Kimuta. Bagaium is a tiny island (less than one hectare (2.5 acres)) about 2 kilometers (1.2 mi) southwest of Kimuta. On the northwest side of the bank several reefs including the islands Baiwa (17 ha; 42 acres), Pana Wadai (1 ha; 2.5 acres) and Pana Roran (6 ha; 15 acres). On the southeast side of the sandbank are the islands of Oreia (5.5 km (3.4 mi) southeast of Kimuta) and Epoko (4 ha (9.9 acres), 13 km (8.1 mi) southeast of Kimuta). Both islands are located in the center of small reef lagoon.

== Population ==
According to the 2014 census, the island group had 617 inhabitants, spread over two villages on the main island Kimuta: Awa (345, in the east) Atuatua (272 in the West) Several sources claim that there is a family from Kimuta that actually lives yearly on the island of Niva Beno.
