= Wule Island =

Island in Papua New Guinea

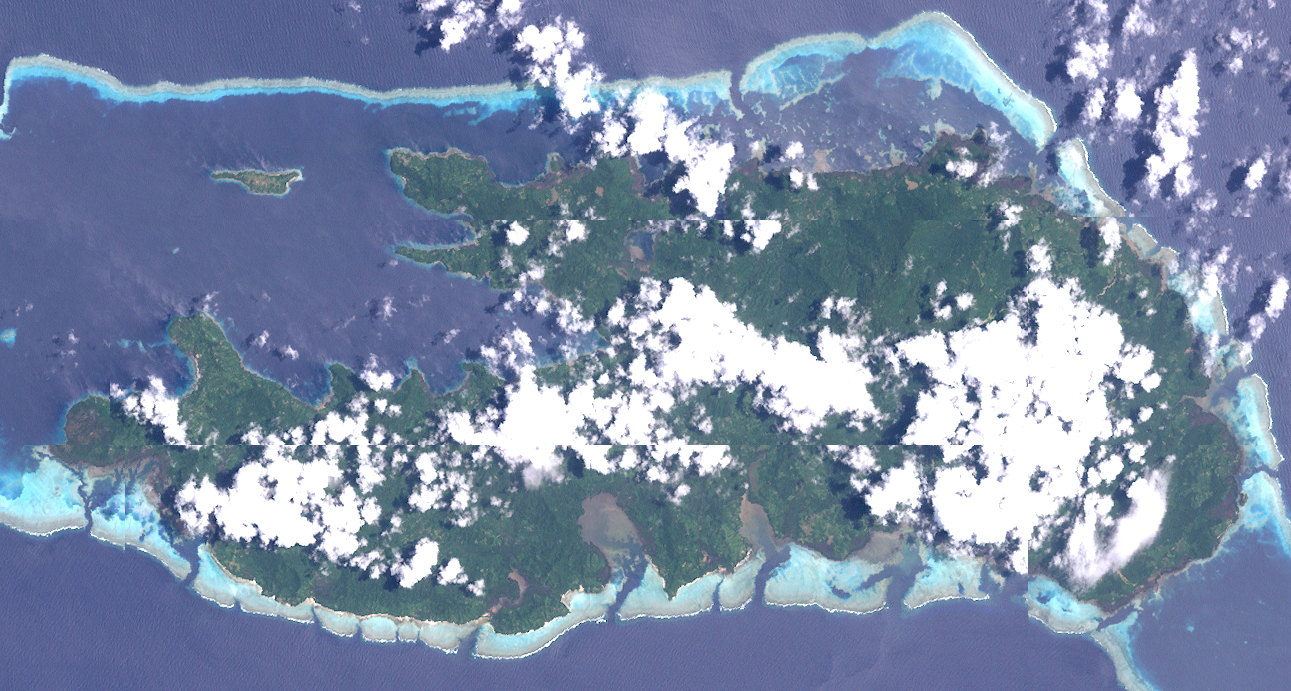
- Rossel as seen from space. Wule is in the left

- Location within Papua New Guinea

Geography
- Location: Oceania
- Coordinates: 11.3°S 154°E
- Archipelago: Louisiade Archipelago
- Adjacent to: Solomon Sea
- Total islands: 1
- Major islands: Wule
- Area: 1.03 km^{2} (0.40 sq mi)
- Highest elevation: 92 m (302 ft)
- Highest point: Mount Wule

Administration
- Papua New Guinea
- Province: Milne Bay
- District: Samarai-Murua District
- LLG: Yaleyamba Rural Local Level Government Area
- Island Group: Rossell Islands
- Largest settlement: Wule (pop. ~100)

Demographics
- Population: 100 (2014)
- Pop. density: 100/km^{2} (300/sq mi)
- Ethnic groups: Papauans, Austronesians, Melanesians.

Additional information
- Time zone: AEST (UTC+10)
- ISO code: PG-MBA
- Official website: www.ncdc.gov.pg

Wule Island is one of the islands in the Rossel Islands, of the Louisiade Archipelago, which itself is part of the Milne Bay Province of Papua New Guinea. It is located 1.5 miles (2.4 km) westward of the main island.

== Demographics ==
In 2014, the population was 100, spread across 2 villages. The main village is Wule, on the east coast.

The indigenous people speak the Yélî Dnye language, a language isolate.
