= Panatanian Island =

Papua New Guinea

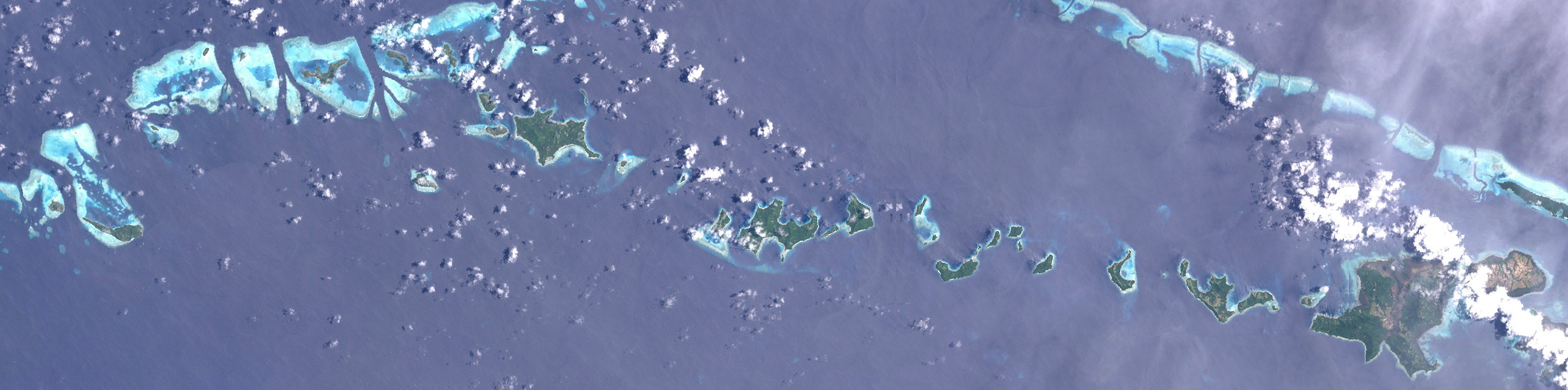
- Satellite image

- Location within Papua New Guinea

Geography
- Location: Oceania
- Coordinates: 11°10′S 152°51′E
- Archipelago: Louisiade Archipelago
- Adjacent to: Solomon Sea
- Total islands: 1
- Major islands: Panatanian
- Area: 0.79 km^{2} (0.31 sq mi)
- Highest elevation: 125 m (410 ft)
- Highest point: Mount Panatanian

Administration
- Papua New Guinea
- Province: Milne Bay
- District: Samarai-Murua District
- LLG: Louisiade Rural LLG
- Island Group: Calvados Chain

Demographics
- Population: 0 (2014)
- Pop. density: 0/km^{2} (0/sq mi)
- Ethnic groups: Papauans, Austronesians, Melanesians.

Additional information
- Time zone: AEST (UTC+10)
- ISO code: PG-MBA
- Official website: www.ncdc.gov.pg

Panatanian Island is an island in Papua New Guinea, part of the Calvados Chain within the Louisiade Archipelago. It is located between Panangaribu and Panakrusima islands. It should not be confused with Pana Tinani, which is a different island in the east.
