= Torlesse Islands =

Island group in Papua New Guinea

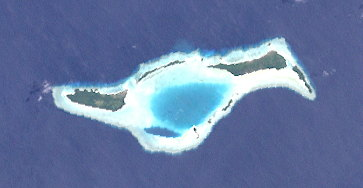

- Location within Papua New Guinea

Geography
- Location: Oceania
- Coordinates: 10°49′48″S 152°11′32″E
- Archipelago: Louisiade Archipelago
- Adjacent to: Solomon Sea
- Total islands: 2 inhabited
- Major islands: Tinolan; Pananiu
- Area: 2.08 km^{2} (0.80 sq mi)
- Highest elevation: 31 m (102 ft)
- Highest point: Mount Pananiu

Administration
- Papua New Guinea
- Province: Milne Bay
- District: Samarai-Murua District
- LLG: Louisiade Rural Local Level Government Area
- Island Group: Torlesse Islands
- Largest settlement: Tinolan (pop. ~5)

Demographics
- Population: 10 (2014)
- Pop. density: 4.8/km^{2} (12.4/sq mi)
- Ethnic groups: Papauans, Austronesians, Melanesians.

Additional information
- Time zone: AEST (UTC+10)
- ISO code: PG-MBA
- Official website: www.ncdc.gov.pg

The Torlesse Islands are an archipelago in the Solomon Sea. Politically they belong to Milne Bay Province in the southeastern region of Papua New Guinea. They are 13 km away from Misima and 5 km west of Deboyne Islands. The aggregate land area of the seven islands is 2.08 km^{2}. The main village is Tinolan. it is inhabited by a family from Panaeati Island who grow Copra.
