= Dumoulin Islands (Louisiade) =

Island group in Papua New Guinea

- Location within Papua New Guinea

Geography
- Location: Oceania
- Coordinates: 10°55′48″S 150°46′32″E
- Archipelago: Louisiade Archipelago
- Adjacent to: Solomon Sea
- Total islands: 6
- Major islands: Ana Karu Karua Island; Baiiri Island
- Area: 0.66 km^{2} (0.25 sq mi)
- Highest elevation: 110 m (360 ft)
- Highest point: Mount Baiiri

Administration
- Papua New Guinea
- Province: Milne Bay
- District: Samarai-Murua District
- LLG: Bwanabwana Rural Local Level Government Area
- Island Group: Dumoulin Islands
- Largest island: Baiiri Island (uninhabited)

Demographics
- Population: 0 (2014)
- Ethnic groups: Papauans, Austronesians, Melanesians.

Additional information
- Time zone: AEST (UTC+10)
- ISO code: PG-MBA
- Official website: www.ncdc.gov.pg

The Dumoulin Islands are an uninhabited group of islands in Louisiade Archipelago.

The Dumoulin Islands belong to the western foothills of Louisiade archipelago. They lie 25 km (16 mi) south of Sideia Island and 40 km (25 mi) east of Brumer Islands. The archipelago consists of four big islands and two small islands.

The four islands rise from an undersea shelf of about 6 km (3.7 mi) in length up to 110 m (360 ft) above sea level. The islands measure just a few hundred meters in diameter. They are hilly, wooded with steep slopes and cliffs and dense forests. Baiiri, the largest island, is located at the western end of the group, and the second largest island, Ana Karu Karua, is located at the eastern end.

In the north of the Dumoulin Islands is a large area of shoals and reefs (Siriki Shoals), the south is a long undersea barrier reef. The people of Wari have copra plantations on Baiiri.

The first recorded sighting by Europeans of Dumoulin Islands was by the Spanish expedition of Luís Vaez de Torres on 20 July 1606.
