= Panapompom Islands =

Island of Papua New Guinea

Panapompom Island
- Location within Papua New Guinea

Geography
- Location: Oceania
- Coordinates: 10°41′S 152°22′E
- Archipelago: Louisiade Archipelago
- Adjacent to: Solomon Sea
- Total islands: 1
- Major islands: Panaeati
- Area: 3.016 sq mi (7.81 km^{2})
- Highest elevation: 213 m (699 ft)
- Highest point: Mount Deboyne

Administration
- Papua New Guinea
- Province: Milne Bay
- District: Samarai-Murua District
- LLG: Louisiade Rural Local Level Government Area
- Island Group: Deboyne Islands
- Largest settlement: Nulia (pop. 200)

Demographics
- Population: 600 (2014)
- Pop. density: 198.964/sq mi (76.8204/km^{2})
- Ethnic groups: Papauans, Austronesians, Melanesians.

Additional information
- Time zone: AEST (UTC+10)
- ISO code: PG-MBA
- Official website: www.ncdc.gov.pg

Panapompom Island is an island of Papua New Guinea. It is in the Deboyne Islands atoll of the Louisiade Archipelago.
