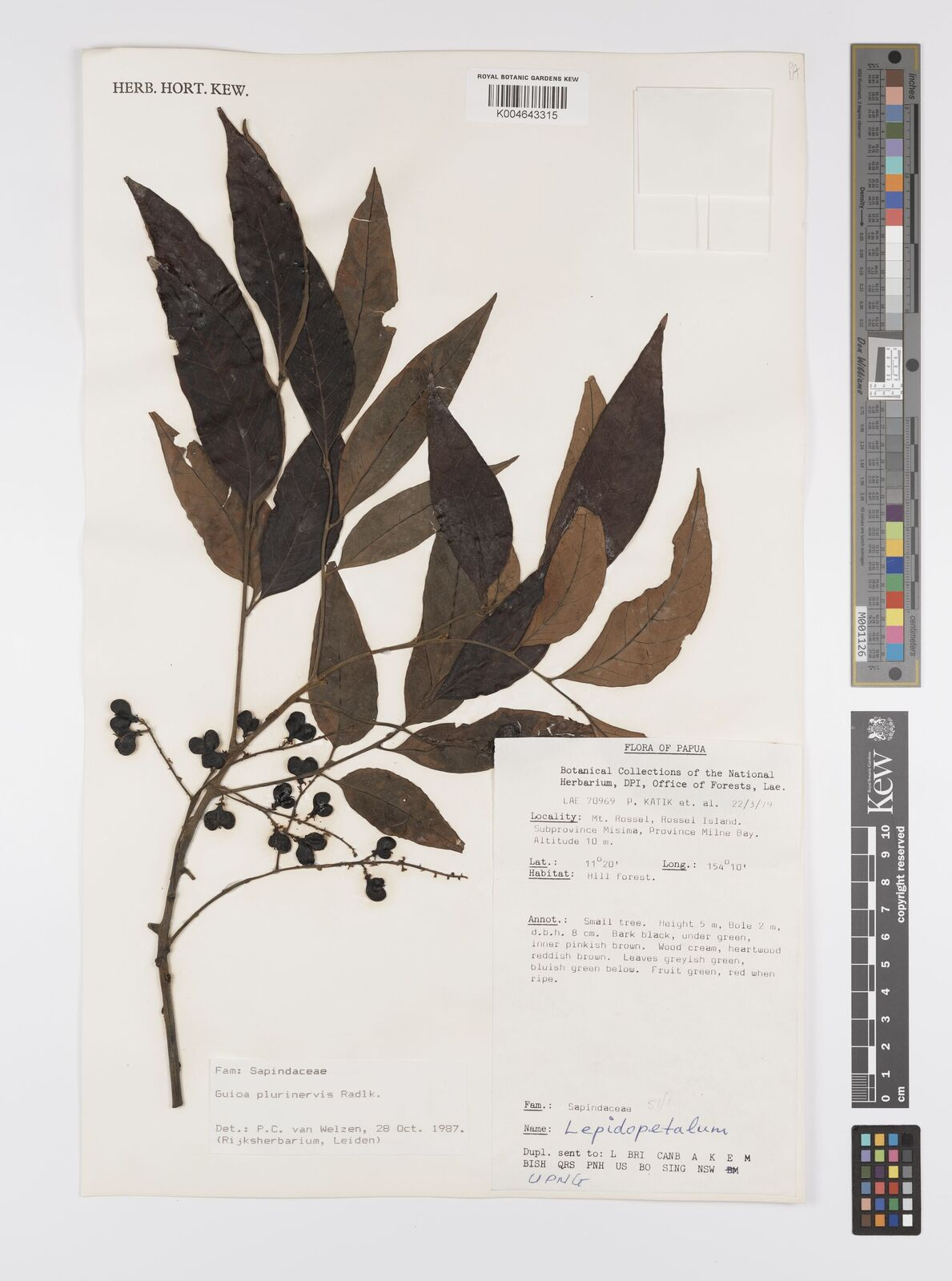

Conservation status
- Vulnerable (IUCN 3.1)

Scientific classification
- Kingdom: Plantae
- Clade: Tracheophytes
- Clade: Angiosperms
- Clade: Eudicots
- Clade: Rosids
- Order: Sapindales
- Family: Sapindaceae
- Genus: Guioa
- Species: G. plurinervis

Binomial name
- Guioa plurinervis Radlk.

= Guioa plurinervis =

Species of flowering plant

Guioa plurinervis is a species of flowering plant in the family Sapindaceae. It is a tree endemic to Rossel Island in the Louisiade Archipelago of eastern Papua New Guinea. It is a small tree which grows from 5 to 12 meters tall, typically in secondary hill rain forest.
