= Lebrun Islands =

Group of islands in the Solomon Sea

- Location within Papua New Guinea

Geography
- Location: Oceania
- Coordinates: 10°53′48″S 150°59′32″E
- Archipelago: Louisiade Archipelago
- Adjacent to: Solomon Sea
- Total islands: 2
- Major islands: Rika Rika; Dogigi
- Area: 0.22 km^{2} (0.085 sq mi)
- Highest elevation: 110 m (360 ft)
- Highest point: Mount Rika Rika

Administration
- Papua New Guinea
- Province: Milne Bay
- District: Samarai-Murua District
- LLG: Louisiade Rural Local Level Government Area \ Yaleyamba Rural LLG \ Bwanabwana
- Island Group: Lebrun Islands
- Largest settlement: Rika Rika

Demographics
- Population: 0 (2014)
- Pop. density: 0/km^{2} (0/sq mi)
- Ethnic groups: Papauans, Austronesians, Melanesians.

Additional information
- Time zone: AEST (UTC+10)
- ISO code: PG-MBA
- Official website: www.ncdc.gov.pg

The Lebrun Islands are a group of uninhabited islands in the Solomon Sea, belonging to Papua New Guinea.

The Lebrun Islands belong to Louisiade Archipelago . They are located 12 km northwest of Wari Island and 22 km northeast of the Dumoulin Islands. Rika Rika is the larger of the two islands that make up the group. The highest elevation on Rika Rika is 109 m. Dogigi is located 4.5 km south of Rika Rika. Administratively, the island belongs to Bwanabwana Rural LLG (Local Level Government area) of Samarai-Murua District in Milne Bay Province. They are administered in the Ward of Wari.
