= Cophixalus tagulensis =

Conservation status
- Data Deficient (IUCN 3.1)

Scientific classification
- Kingdom: Animalia
- Phylum: Chordata
- Class: Amphibia
- Order: Anura
- Family: Microhylidae
- Genus: Cophixalus
- Species: C. tagulensis

Binomial name
- Cophixalus tagulensis Zweifel, 1963

Species of frog

Cophixalus tagulensis is a species of frog in the family Microhylidae. It is endemic to Papua New Guinea and only known from the Tagula Island in the Louisiade Archipelago, east of New Guinea. It is only known from the type series of three specimens collected in 1956.

Type locality of Cophixalus tagulensis, the Tagula Island in the Louisiade Archipelago

== Description ==
The holotype, an adult male, measured 17.7 mm (0.70 in) in snout–vent length. The unsexed paratypes measured 13.5 and 18.5 mm (0.53 and 0.73 in) SVL. The snout is blunt. The tympanum is not visible. The skin is smooth both dorsally and ventrally. The fingers and toes have small discs, those of fingers being smaller than those of toes. The fingers and toes have lateral fringes; the toes are in addition about one-half webbed.

== Habitat and conservation ==
Its natural habitat is tropical moist lowland forests. The types were collected on the west slope of Mount Riu at elevations of about 250–350 m (820–1,150 ft) above sea level. No significant threats are known; the forests on Tagula were logged about 100 years ago but have since recovered.
