= Engineer Islands =

Island group in Papua New Guinea

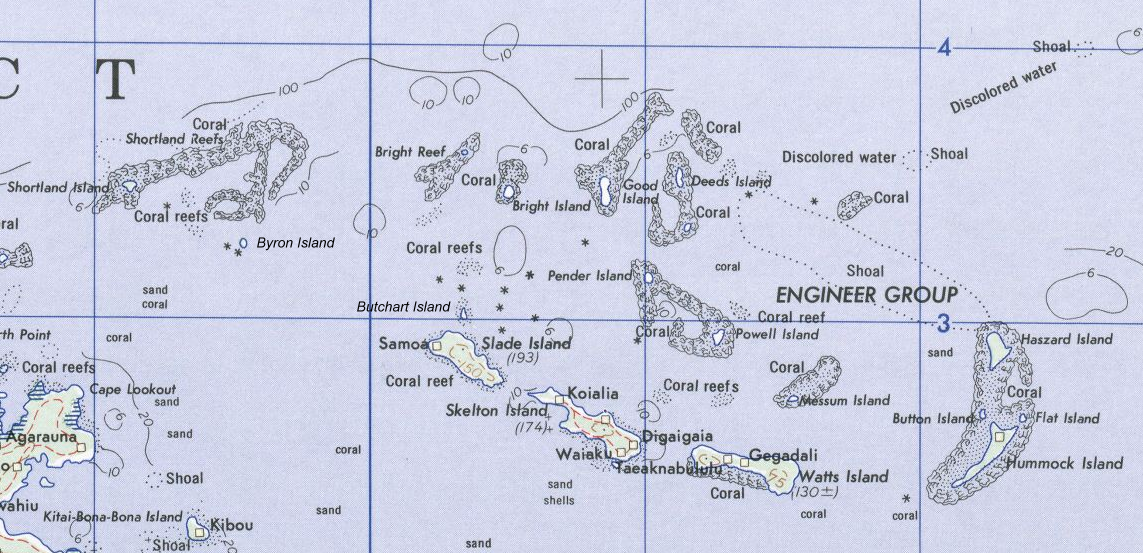

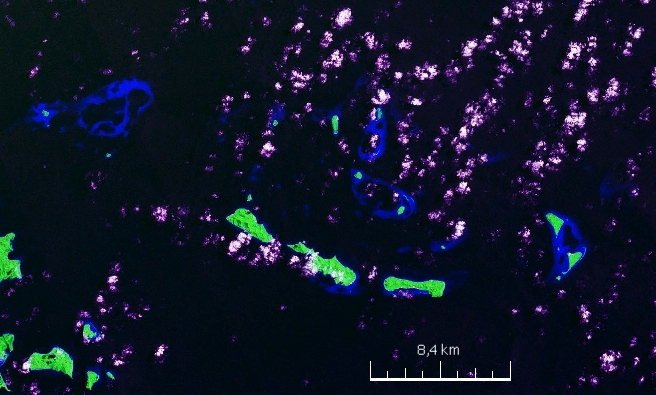

- Location within Papua New Guinea

Geography
- Location: Oceania
- Coordinates: 10°34′48″S 151°14′32″E
- Archipelago: Louisiade Archipelago
- Adjacent to: Solomon Sea
- Total islands: 15
- Major islands: Skelton; Slade; Watts; Hummock
- Area: 11.12 km^{2} (4.29 sq mi)
- Highest elevation: 198 m (650 ft)
- Highest point: Mount Slade

Administration
- Papua New Guinea
- Province: Milne Bay
- District: Samarai-Murua District
- LLG: Bwanabwana Rural Local Level Government Area
- Island Group: Engineer Islands
- Largest settlement: Gegadali (pop. ~270)

Demographics
- Population: 1200 (2014)
- Pop. density: 108/km^{2} (280/sq mi)
- Ethnic groups: Papauans, Austronesians, Melanesians.

Additional information
- Time zone: AEST (UTC+10)
- ISO code: PG-MBA
- Official website: www.ncdc.gov.pg

The Engineer Islands are an archipelago in the Solomon Sea belonging to Papua New-Guinea.

== Geography ==
The Engineer Islands belong to Milne Bay Province, and are one of the groups forming the Louisiade Archipelago. They are located on the western edge of Louisiade archipelago, east of Basilaki and south of Normanby . The islands form an unusual group consisting of high islands, low coral islands, atolls and underwater reefs, which are located in a radius of 24 to 14 km (14.9 to 8.7 mi) away. The three largest islands lie on the southwestern part of the group. They are: Tubetube (Slade Island), Naruaruari (Skelton Island ) and Kwaraiwa (Watts island), each about 3.5 km (2.2 mi) long and about 0.75 km (0.47 mi) wide. The islands are hilly with elevations of up to 150 m (490 ft) (at Slade Island). The eastern boundary of the Engineer group is marked by a crescent-shaped reef, on which the four low islands Hummock, Haszard, Button and Flat are located. In the center of the archipelago there is a reef with a semi-enclosed lagoon. on it, the islands Powell and Pender lying on the western side while Messum Island is on the eastern side.

== Climate ==
Engineer islands have a tropical rainforest climate (Af) with heavy to very heavy rainfall year-round. The following climate data is for Slade island.

Climate data for Slade island (Kasapae village)
Month	Jan	Feb	Mar	Apr	May	Jun	Jul	Aug	Sep	Oct	Nov	Dec	Year
Mean daily maximum °C (°F)	30.8 (87.4)	31.3 (88.3)	30.6 (87.1)	29.4 (84.9)	28.4 (83.1)	27.5 (81.5)	27.1 (80.8)	27.3 (81.1)	28.0 (82.4)	28.9 (84.0)	29.8 (85.6)	30.6 (87.1)	29.1 (84.4)
Daily mean °C (°F)	27.0 (80.6)	27.3 (81.1)	27.0 (80.6)	26.2 (79.2)	25.6 (78.1)	24.9 (76.8)	24.5 (76.1)	24.7 (76.5)	25.2 (77.4)	25.9 (78.6)	26.3 (79.3)	26.9 (80.4)	26.0 (78.7)
Mean daily minimum °C (°F)	23.3 (73.9)	23.4 (74.1)	23.5 (74.3)	23.1 (73.6)	22.9 (73.2)	22.3 (72.1)	22.0 (71.6)	22.1 (71.8)	22.4 (72.3)	22.9 (73.2)	22.9 (73.2)	23.2 (73.8)	22.8 (73.1)
Average precipitation mm (inches)	216 (8.5)	229 (9.0)	244 (9.6)	350 (13.8)	354 (13.9)	312 (12.3)	292 (11.5)	308 (12.1)	304 (12.0)	286 (11.3)	180 (7.1)	197 (7.8)	3,272 (128.9)
Source: Climate-Data.org

== Administration ==
There are several more island groups that belong to the Engineer Islands Ward:

- The Shortland Islands are located 2 km (1.2 mi) to the northwest.
- Laseinie Islands (with Koyagaugau (Dawson Island)) are located 20 km (12 mi) to the north.
- Kegawam Islands are located 25 km (16 mi) to the north.

== History ==
John Moresby discovered the islands in 1873 and named them in honor of the English Engineers of his steamboat HMS Basilisk. The islands were named after the individual crew members from the engine room: Slade, Skelton, Watts, Butchart, Bright, among others.

== Population ==
There are 4 inhabited islands, with the main village Gegadali located on Watts Island. The inhabitants of the archipelago speak Bwanabwana Language.
