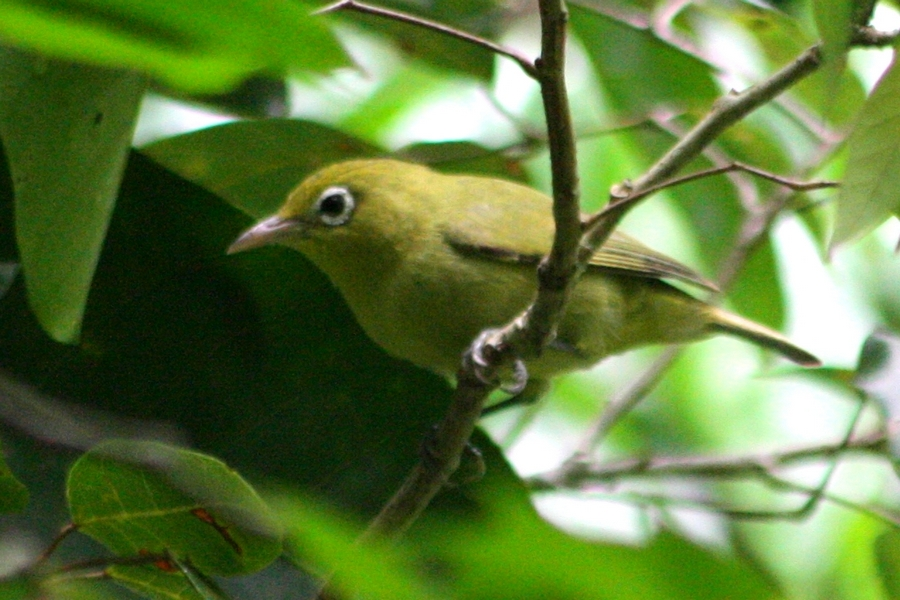
- on Duchess Island, D'Entrecasteaux Islands, Papua New-Guinea

Conservation status
- Least Concern (IUCN 3.1)

Scientific classification
- Kingdom: Animalia
- Phylum: Chordata
- Class: Aves
- Order: Passeriformes
- Family: Zosteropidae
- Genus: Zosterops
- Species: Z. griseotinctus

Binomial name
- Zosterops griseotinctus GR Gray, 1858

= Louisiade white-eye =

Species of bird

The Louisiade white-eye or islet white-eye (Zosterops griseotinctus) is a species of bird in the family Zosteropidae. It is endemic to Papua New Guinea, where it is found on widely disjunct islets on both the Bismarck and Louisiade archipelagos.

Its natural habitat is subtropical or tropical moist lowland forests.

There are five subspecies recognized by the International Ornithological Congress:

- Z. g. ottomeyeri Stresemann, 1930 - Nauna
- Z. g. eichhorni Hartert, 1926 - several disjunct islets in the Bismarck Archipelago
- Z. g. griseotinctus Gray, GR, 1858 - west-central Louisiade Archipelago
- Z. g. longirostris Ramsay, 1879 - islets east of New Guinea
- Z. g. pallidipes De Vis, 1890 - Rossel Island
