= Gilia Island =

Island in Papua New Guinea

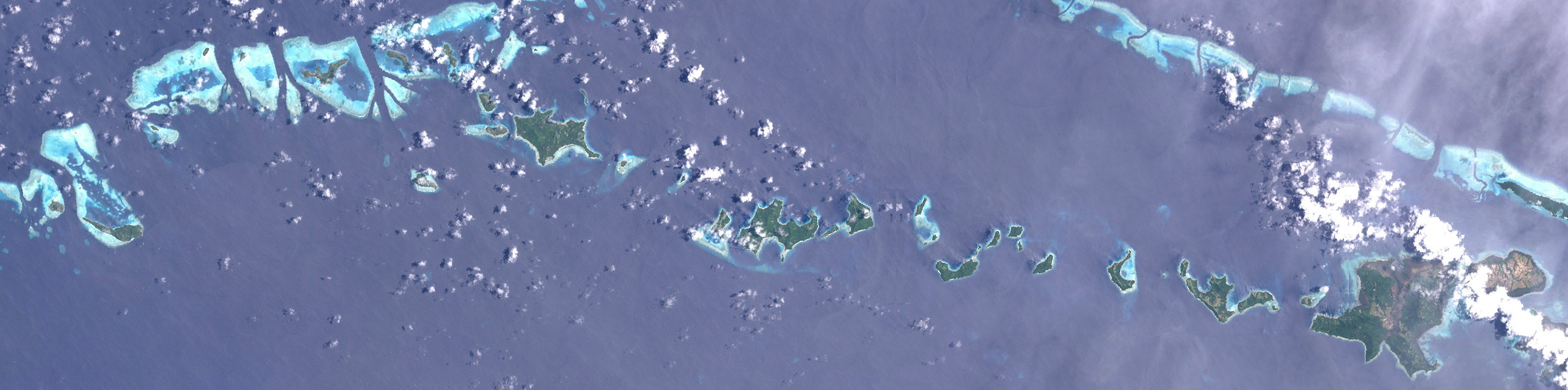
- Satellite image

- Location within Papua New Guinea

Geography
- Location: Oceania
- Coordinates: 11°08′S 152°44′E
- Archipelago: Louisiade Archipelago
- Adjacent to: Solomon Sea
- Total islands: 1
- Major islands: Gilia
- Area: 0.36 km^{2} (0.14 sq mi)

Administration
- Papua New Guinea
- Province: Milne Bay
- District: Samarai-Murua District
- LLG: Louisiade Rural LLG
- Island Group: Calvados Chain

Demographics
- Population: 0 (2014)
- Pop. density: 0/km^{2} (0/sq mi)
- Ethnic groups: Papauans, Austronesians, Melanesians.

Additional information
- Time zone: AEST (UTC+10)
- ISO code: PG-MBA
- Official website: www.ncdc.gov.pg

Gilia Island is an island in Papua New Guinea, part of the Calvados Chain within the Louisiade Archipelago. It is located near Bagaman Island. It is used as a coconut camp for the men of Bagaman. In recent years, Bagaman islanders use Gilia for claiming coconuts.
