= Hardman Islands =

Archipelago in the Solomon Sea

- Location within Papua New Guinea

Geography
- Location: Oceania
- Coordinates: 10°25′30″S 151°18′33″E
- Archipelago: Louisiade Archipelago
- Adjacent to: Solomon Sea
- Total islands: 2
- Major islands: Hardman Island
- Area: 0.25 km^{2} (0.097 sq mi)
- Highest elevation: 50 m (160 ft)
- Highest point: Mount Hardman

Administration
- Papua New Guinea
- Province: Milne Bay
- District: Samarai-Murua District
- LLG: Bwanabwana Rural Local Level Government Area
- Island Group: Laseinie Islands
- Largest settlement: Hardman

Demographics
- Population: 0 (2014)
- Pop. density: 0/km^{2} (0/sq mi)
- Ethnic groups: Papauans, Austronesians, Melanesians.

Additional information
- Time zone: AEST (UTC+10)
- ISO code: PG-MBA
- Official website: www.ncdc.gov.pg

The Hardman Islands are an archipelago in the Solomon Sea. Politically they belong to Bwanabwana Rural LLG of Samarai-Murua District of Milne Bay Province, in the southeastern region of Papua New Guinea. They are located southeast of the D'Entrecasteaux Islands. They are part of the Louisiade Archipelago, and are administered under The Laseinie Islands Ward.

The islands are uninhabited.
