= Louisiade Archipelago =

Archipelago of Papua New Guinea

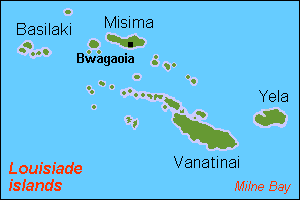

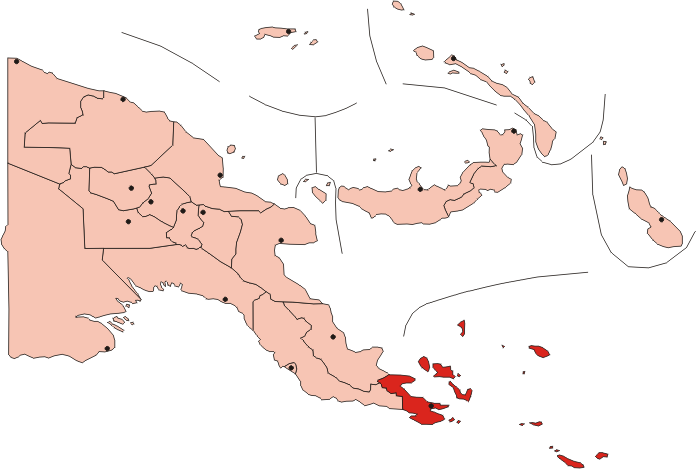
- The Louisiade Archipelago is part of Milne Bay Province (in dark red)

Geography
- Coordinates: 11°12′S 153°00′E
- Total islands: 300+
- Area: 1,871.1 km^{2} (722.4 sq mi)

Administration
- Papua New Guinea
- Province: Milne Bay Province
- Largest settlement: Bwagaoia on Misima Island (pop. 2680)

Demographics
- Population: 47000 (2014)

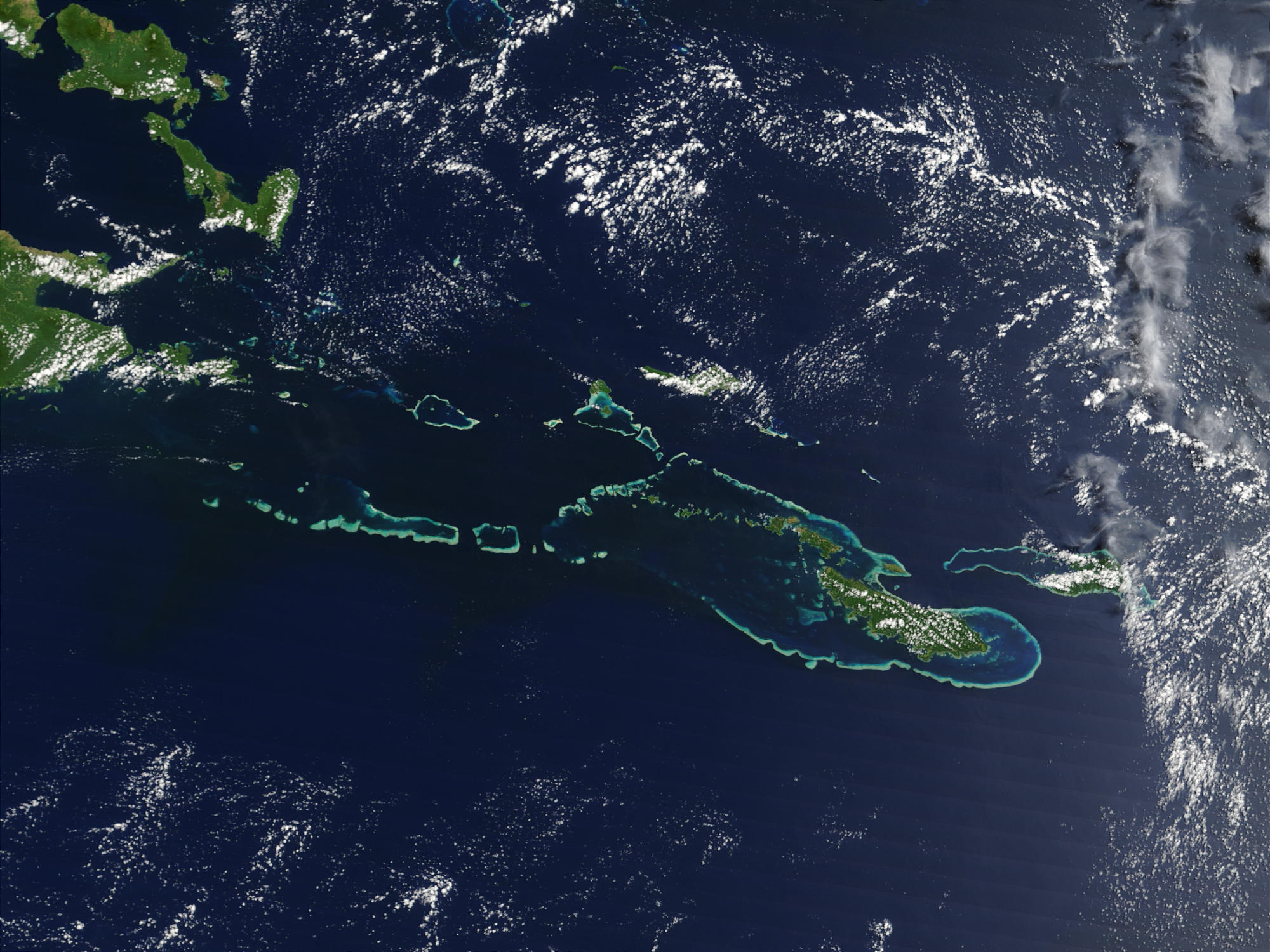
Moving westward from eastern end of the chain are the islands of Rossel and Vanatinai (Tagula). Misima Island, which harbors the largest village in the region, is obscured by a patch of clouds northeast of image center

The Louisiade Archipelago is a string of ten larger volcanic islands frequently fringed by coral reefs, and 90 smaller coral islands in Papua New Guinea.

It is located 200 km southeast of New Guinea, stretching over more than 160 kilometres (99 mi) and spread over an ocean area of 26,000 square kilometres (10,000 mi^{2}) between the Solomon Sea to the north and the Coral Sea to the south. The aggregate land area of the islands is about 1,871 square kilometres (722 mi^{2}), with Vanatinai (Sudest) beingness the largest.

Rogeia (Logea), Samarai and Sariba lie closest to New Guinea, while Misima, Vanatinai, and Rossel islands lie further east.

== History ==
The islands were discovered by a Spanish expedition led by Luis Váez de Torres in 1606, that was part of the Fernandez de Quiros fleet which had sailed from South America in search of Australia. The Torres expedition visited various islands including Basilaki Island, which he named San Buenaventura in July 1606. It is possible that Malay and Chinese sailors also visited the islands earlier. More than a century later, in 1768, Louis Antoine de Bougainville visited the islands and named them for Louis XV, the king of France. Visits were also paid by Admiral Bruni d'Entrecasteaux in 1793 and Captain Owen Stanley in 1849.

The 1942 Battle of Coral Sea was fought nearby, after Japanese occupation in the same year. The Deboyne Islands were the site of the 1942 Raids on Deboyne.

== Rain forests ==
The islands have a moist tropical climate, and are largely covered with tropical moist broadleaf forests. The Louisiade Archipelago rain forests form a distinct ecoregion, and are home to a number of endemic species, including several endemic trees (in genera Pandanus, Diospyros, and Hopea), as well as five endemic frog species, two endemic lizard species, and five endemic bird species. The Louisiade flowerpecker (Dicaeum nitidum), Louisiade pitta (Erythropitta meeki), Tagula butcherbird (Cracticus louisiadensis), Tagula honeyeater (Microptilotis vicina), and white-chinned myzomela (Myzomela albigula) are endemic, and the Louisiade white-eye (Zosterops griseotinctus) is a near-endemic. There are 24 native mammal species, including 18 species of bats and several rodents; these include the Island tube-nosed fruit bat (Nyctimene major), Panniet naked-backed fruit bat (Dobsonia pannietensis), and St. Aignan's trumpet-eared bat (Kerivoula agnella).

== Government ==
The archipelago is divided into the Local Level Government (LLG) areas Bwanabwana Rural (western part, with Basilaki), Louisiade Rural (central part, with Misima), and Yaleyamba (eastern part, with Rossel and Vanatinai islands). The LLG areas are part of Samarai-Murua District of Milne Bay. The seat of the Louisiade Rural LLG is Bwagaoia on Misima Island, the population center of the archipelago. The seat of the Yaleyamba is changed every couple of years between Rambuso and Jingo (Rossell). The seat of the Bwanabwana was Samarai from the Louisiade archipelago, but was recently transferred to the mainland of Papua New Guinea to the city of Alotau.

== Islands ==
The Louisiade Archipelago consists of the following island groups and islands:

Island	Capital	Other Cities	Area		Population
Island	Capital	Other Cities	km^{2}	sq mi	Population
Bentley Islands	Anagusa	Nare	2.49	0.96	122
Anagusa	Anagusa		1.42	0.55	112
Mudge	Nare		1.07	0.41	10
Bonvouloir Islands			5.54	2.14	0
East			2.93	1.13	0
Hastings			1.26	0.49	0
Strathord			1.35	0.52	0
Calvados Chain	Pana Wina	Motorina, Bagaman, Hemenahei	85.1	32.9	3276
Bagaman	Bagaman		7.45	2.88	264
Bobo Eina			2.43	0.94	0
Bonna Wan			1.09	0.42	0
Gigila	Nogui		1.42	0.55	121
Gilia			0.36	0.14	0
Gulewa	Gulewa		0.59	0.23	18
Hemenahei			10.15	3.92	0
Kuwanak	Kuwanak		3.66	1.41	170
Mabneian			0.38	0.15	0
Motorina	Riman Bay	Tawara, Mabaraboraboa	7.8	3.0	595
Nigaho	Nigaho		0.1	0.039	226
North Leiga			0.05	0.019	0
Other	Burnett	Ehiki, Panua Keikeisa	1.78	0.69	0
Pana Krusima			1.47	0.57	0
Pana Numara	Hoba Bay		1.93	0.75	183
Pana Rora			0.81	0.31	0
Pana Udu Udi			0.69	0.27	0
Pana Varavara			0.57	0.22	0
Pana Wina	Bomalou	Panambari, Boiama Point	30.55	11.80	456
Panangaribu			0.5	0.19	0
Panasia			2.11	0.81	0
Panatanian			0.79	0.31	0
Sabari	Hekampan	Tandeyai, Hebenahine, Maho	4.04	1.56	708
Sloss			0.36	0.14	0
South Leiga			0.05	0.019	0
Taifaur			0.4	0.15	0
Ululina	Ululina		0.59	0.23	5
Utian	Utian		1.54	0.59	514
Venariwa	Venariwa		0.76	0.29	16
Yakimoan			0.31	0.12	0
Yaruman			0.37	0.14	0
Conflict Group	Panasesa	Irai, Lunn	5.06	1.95	30
Auriroa			0.76	0.29	0
Gabugabutau			0.12	0.046	0
Ginara			0.14	0.054	0
Irai	Irai		1.08	0.42	20
Itamarina			0.04	0.015	0
Lunn			0.51	0.20	0
Moniara			0.2	0.077	0
Other	Kolavia	Madiboiboi, Lutmatavi	0.4	0.15	0
Panaboal			0.52	0.20	0
Panarakuum			0.51	0.20	0
Panasesa	Panasesa		0.68	0.26	10
Quesal			0.08	0.031	0
Tupit			0.02	0.0077	0
Deboyne Islands	Bwaganati	Nulia	41.9	16.2	2700
Losai			0.01	0.0039	0
Nibub			0.02	0.0077	0
Nivani	Nivani		0.5	0.19	20
Pana Uya Wana			0.36	0.14	0
Panaeati	Bwaganati	Maggiau, Palualual, Siakeu, Namati, Panakakamwa, Nulia Wharf, Lebwalebwal	30.32	11.71	2080
Panapompom	Nulia	Galowawaisana, Panaewau	7.72	2.98	600
Passage			0.06	0.023	0
Rara			0.14	0.054	0
Duchateau Islands			2.58	1.00	0
Jomard Islands			0.96	0.37	0
Kukuluba			0.32	0.12	0
Montemont Islands			0.12	0.046	0
Pana Bobai Ana			0.75	0.29	0
Pana Rura Wara			0.42	0.16	0
Dumoulin Islands			0.66	0.25	0
Ana Karu Karua			0.2	0.077	0
Baiiri			0.34	0.13	0
Duperre Islands	Punawan		0.82	0.32	10
Duperre			0.15	0.058	0
Punawan	Punawan		0.43	0.17	10
East Deboyne Islands			1.02	0.39	0
Basses Group			0.51	0.205	0
Bushy Islets			0.10	0.0395	0
Mabui			0.02	0.00777	0
Pana Sagusagu			0.17	0.0662	0
Redlick Islets			0.2	0.077	0
Engineer Islands	Skelton	Watts	11.12	4.29	1200
Bright			0.07	0.027	0
Butchart			0.09	0.035	0
Button			0.07	0.027	0
Deedes			0.11	0.042	0
Flat			0.03	0.012	0
Good			0.32	0.12	0
Haszard			0.72	0.28	0
Hummock	Tewatewa		0.61	0.24	105
Messum			0.06	0.023	0
Pender			0.12	0.046	0
Powell			0.15	0.058	0
Skelton	Naruaruari	Koialia, Waiaku, Digaigaia	3.56	1.37	375
Slade	Samoa	Tubetube	2.61	1.01	245
Watts	Gegadali	Taeaknabululu, Kwaraiwa	2.56	0.99	475
Laseinie Islands	Dawson		2	0.77	245
Dawson	Koyagaugau		1.36	0.53	245
Hardman			0.25	0.097	0
Kagawan			0.05	0.019	0
Keaawan			0.3	0.12	0
Misima Islands	Bwagaoia		215	83	19330
Gigira			0.03	0.012	0
Managun			0.26	0.10	0
Misima	Bwagaoia	Baimatana, Hinauta, Kaubwaga, Boiou, Siagara, Kalotawa, Gulewa, Mwana, Liak, Panataval, Bagilina, Manihuna, Ewena, Ebora, Bwagabwaga, Alhoga, Eaus, Gaibobo, Narian	214.5	82.8	19330
Daloloia Group			0.13	0.050	0
Pana Tinani Islands	Bwailahina	Kabagi-bagi	99.92	38.58	1764
Daddahai	Dadahai		0.25	0.0978	34
Hevaisi			0.23	0.0894	1
Nimoa	Soluwo	Boiminusi, Woos, Galanga Beach	3.55	1.376	395
Osasai			0.13	0.0503	0
Pana Tinani	Bwailahina	Hobuk, Hauagili, Hessessai Bay, Buvara Bay, Bounce Point, Imadi Bay, Gawn Point, Hati Lawi Bay, Heihuti Bay, Bonawi Point	78	30	527
Sibumbum			0.01	0.0039	0
Wanim	Bunbun		1.66	0.64	400
Yeina	Kabagi-bagi	Araeda, Buwo, Jolandan	16	6.2	407
Renard Islands	Kimuta		4.3	1.7	617
Baiwa			0.17	0.066	0
Kimuta	Awa	Atuatua	2.86	1.10	617
Manuga Reef			0.02	0.0077	0
Niva Beno			0.49	0.19	0
Oreia			0.47	0.18	0
Rossel Islands	Rossel		293.8	113.4	5100
Adele Islet			0.18	0.069	0
Diama			0.06	0.023	1
Other	Heron		0.02	0.0077	7
Pocklington Reef			0.01	0.0039	0
Rossel	Jinjo	Damunu, Yonga Bay, Mbuwo, Morpa, Wulunga Bay, Pum, Pwepwo, Piniga, Abeleti, Vyukwa, N’Jaru, Wale, Saman, Pambwa	292.5	112.9	5000
Wule	Wule		1.03	0.40	92
Samarai Islands	Samarai	Basilaki	262.1	101.2	8200
Arch Islands	Nasa Rua Rua		0.5	0.19	0
Doini	Doini		4.07	1.57	30
Tuyam			0.16	0.062	0
Gonubalabala	Ranger station		0.26	0.10	0
Logea	Kasabanalua	Kumikuku, Dabali, Pota	9.02	3.48	1004
Deka Deka			0.04	0.015	0
Bonarua Hili Hili			0.05	0.019	0
Kwato	Kwato	Isuhina	0.35	0.14	66
Samarai	Samarai		0.29	0.11	460
Ebuma	Evennett Mansion		0.02	0.00772	1
Gesila			0.17	0.066	19
Dagadaga			0.07	0.027	1
Kwai Ama			0.03	0.012	0
Beika			0.02	0.0077	0
Galahi	Galahi		0.92	0.36	20
Lesimano			0.21	0.081	0
Igwali	Igwali	Naba Riaria, Ga-Uri	1.47	0.57	10
Kui	Kui		0.19	0.073	5
Ito			3.06	1.18	10
Sariba	Sidudu	Sauasauaga, Magehau, Sebuluna	23.21	8.96	1880
Sideia	Sideia	Oba, Gotai, Gadogadowa, Sekuku, Dulauna, Tegerauna	101.3	39.1	1890
Populai	Margaret Ville		1.71	0.66	15
Dinana			0.9	0.35	0
Buiari	Weitoa		3.12	1.20	500
Basilaki	Yokowa	Habani	106	41	1883
Kitai Bai			0.11	0.042	0
Kitai Katoa	Maragum		0.55	0.21	17
Kitai Katu			0.72	0.28	10
Kitai Lilivea			3	1.2	190
Kitai Bona Bona	Kibou		0.42	0.16	10
Castori Islets	Baia Baia Karona		0.18	0.069	0
Gado-Gadoa			0.15	0.058	1
Wasima			0.05	0.019	0
Other		Sripkunui Island, Nasariri Island, Didigilo Island, Grant Island, Shortland Island	0.8	0.31	0
Torlesse Islands			2.08	0.80	0
Pananiu			0.86	0.33	0
Tinolan			0.8	0.31	0
Vanatinai Islands	Rambuso	Tagula, Donuwo, Bololo	831.6	321.1	3360
Boboa			0.07	0.027	0
Iyen	Iyen		0.86	0.33	102
Pana Man			0.12	0.046	0
Vanatinai	Rambuso	Tagula, Eden, Mitin, Edwahi, Griffin Point, Tarangia, Lajamare, Donuwo, Siri Point, Buiawe, Bololo, Emeli, Pamela, Madaua, Jelewaga	830	320	3257
Venama			0.55	0.21	0
Wari Islands	Wari		3.85	1.49	926
Imbert			0.22	0.085	0
Kosman Reef	Kosman	Nabaina	0.17	0.066	100
Lebrun Islands			0.22	0.085	0
Long Reef	Lejeune		0.03	0.012	100
Other			0.15	0.058	0
Quessant			0.41	0.16	0
Sable			0.03	0.012	0
Siga			0.01	0.0039	0
Stuers Islands			0.34	0.13	0
Wari	Wari		2.27	0.88	726
Louisiade Archipelago	Bwagaoia	Samarai, Rossel	1,871.1	722.4	47000

== See also ==
- List of islands of Papua New Guinea
- Louisiade Rural LLG
