= Mitin =

Mitin (Russian: Митин) is a Russian masculine surname, its feminine counterpart is Mitina. The surname is derived from Mitya, a diminutive of the male given name Dmitry, and literally means Mitya's. It may refer to

- Aleksei Mitin (born 1973), Russian footballer
- Darya Mitina (born 1973), Russian politician, historian and cinema critic
- Mark Borisovich Mitin (1901-1987), Soviet Marxist-Leninist philosopher and university lecturer
- Sergey Anatolyevich Mitin (born 1980), Russian footballer
- Sergey Gerasimovich Mitin (born 1951), Russian politician
- Viktoria Mitina, Russian politician
