= Deboyne Islands =

Group of islands in Papua New Guinea

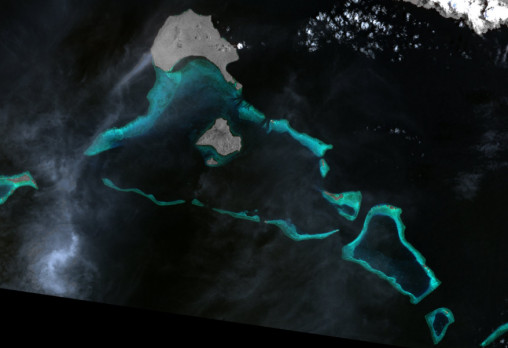

- Location within Papua New Guinea

Geography
- Location: Oceania
- Coordinates: 10°43′S 152°22′E
- Archipelago: Louisiade Archipelago
- Adjacent to: Solomon Sea
- Total islands: 8
- Major islands: Panaeati; Panapompom
- Area: 39.14 km^{2} (15.11 sq mi)
- Highest elevation: 213 m (699 ft)
- Highest point: Mount Deboyne

Administration
- Papua New Guinea
- Province: Milne Bay
- District: Samarai-Murua District
- LLG: Louisiade Rural Local Level Government Area
- Island Group: Deboyne Islands
- Largest settlement: Bwaganati (pop. 500)

Demographics
- Population: 2700 (2014)
- Pop. density: 69/km^{2} (179/sq mi)
- Ethnic groups: Papauans, Austronesians, Melanesians.

Additional information
- Time zone: AEST (UTC+10)
- ISO code: PG-MBA
- Official website: www.ncdc.gov.pg

The Deboyne Islands are an atoll, composed of a group of reefs and islands in the north of the Louisiade Archipelago, Papua New Guinea.

== Geography ==
They are located 13 km (8 mi) from Misima and 5 km (3 mi) from the Torlesse Islands. Islands in the Deboyne Islands include Panaeati (the northernmost), Panapompom, Nivani, Pana Uya Wana, Rara, Losai, Nibub and Passage Island.

== History ==
The Deboyne Islands were discovered in 1793 by Antoine Bruni d'Entrecasteaux. He named the islands after Pierre Étienne Bourgeois de Boynes, who was the Marine and Colonial Minister of France at that time. During World War II, the islands were used as a seaplane outpost by the Imperial Japanese Navy, from 5–12 May 1942.

== Population ==
The settlements in the main island Panaeati are all located on the south coast of the island, facing the lagoon. the language spoken on the islands is Misima-Paneati language.

== Economy ==
Nivani, the small island south of Panapompom, has a small vocational school and slipway. Yachts are regular visitors to the Louisiade Archipelago. Nivani is a favorite anchorage for these yachts, with averages of about 15 yachts a year. A small ecotourist resort was recently built at Nivani that would respect the environment, yet provide business opportunities for the population of Panapompom community. The resort is a success especially with yachtsman, divers and film crews.

== See also ==
- Japanese seaplane tender Kamikawa Maru
- American Deboyne Strike (1942)

== Bibliography ==
- Klar, John W. (1989). "Question 56/87". Warship International. XXVI (1): 89–90. ISSN 0043-0374.
