= Laseinie Islands =

Archipelago in Solomon Sea

- Location within Papua New Guinea

Geography
- Location: Oceania
- Coordinates: 10°24′00″S 151°24′00″E
- Archipelago: Louisiade Archipelago
- Adjacent to: Solomon Sea
- Total islands: 8
- Major islands: Dawson; Keaawan
- Area: 2.00 km^{2} (0.77 sq mi)
- Highest elevation: 138 m (453 ft)
- Highest point: Mount Dawson

Administration
- Papua New Guinea
- Province: Milne Bay
- District: Samarai-Murua District
- LLG: Bwanabwana Rural Local Level Government Area
- Island Group: Laseinie Islands
- Largest settlement: Koyagaugau (pop. ~200)

Demographics
- Population: 245 (2014)
- Pop. density: 122/km^{2} (316/sq mi)
- Ethnic groups: Papauans, Austronesians, Melanesians.

Additional information
- Time zone: AEST (UTC+10)
- ISO code: PG-MBA
- Official website: www.ncdc.gov.pg

The Laseinie Islands are an archipelago in the Solomon Sea. Politically they belong to Bwanabwana Rural LLG of Samarai-Murua District of Milne Bay Province, in the southeastern region of Papua New Guinea. They are located southeast of the D'Entrecasteaux Islands. They are part of the Louisiade Archipelago.

== Background ==
The Laseinie Islands are located on a flat sandbank, 16 km wide and 7 km long. The northern edge of the bank is marked by a series of reefs, on which several groups of small islands are located. In the West, there are 2 small islands belonging to a sub-group of Hardman Islands. The main islands are on the northern part of the bank, and consist of the Kagawan group (2 small islands), Dawson Island, Keaawan Island, and another tiny island southeast of Dawson.

The 245 inhabitants (2014 census) all live on the main island of Dawson. They speak the Bwanabwana language.
