= Raids on Deboyne (1942) =

A series of raids on Deboyne were conducted by Allied forces against the Imperial Japanese Navy seaplane base in the Deboyne Islands of the Louisiade Archipelago between 9–11 May 1942. The seaplane base had been set up prior to the Battle of Coral Sea and became untenable and was abandoned by the Japanese, due to proximity to Allied airfields at Port Moresby and the failure of Mo Sakusen (Operation Mo).

== Deboyne atoll installations ==
Deboyne is the name for both an island and the atoll of which it is a part. Deboyne Island is also known as Panniet Island. It is in the Louisiade Archipelago east of Papua New Guinea. During World War II, the Japanese built a temporary seaplane base in the lagoon at Deboyne Atoll as part of MO Sakusen, the attempt to capture Port Moresby, Papua. The base was created by units that came from Rabaul, New Britain and Shortland Island in the Solomon Islands, including the seaplane tender Kamikawa Maru. The base existed for approximately five-and-a-half days in May 1942, including the Battle of the Coral Sea. During that time the Japanese Navy operated a small number of Aichi E13A (Jake), Mitsubishi F1M (Pete), Nakajima E8N (Dave) and possibly other types of seaplanes there. Fortifications were minimal, consisting of felled palm trees and small-caliber anti-aircraft guns on shore, as well as any firepower on ships in the lagoon.

== Operations at Deboyne ==
Two Australian planes made contact with the Japanese seaplane base force as it was approaching the Deboyne atoll on May 6, 1942, to set up the base. Lockheed Hudson bomber A16-160 escaped, but Catalina A24-20 was shot down by three Japanese seaplanes in the vicinity of Misima Island. An Australian Hudson carried out a bombing raid early on May 7.

The light aircraft carrier Shôhô was sunk later on May 7, 1942, by American carrier-based airplanes north and east of Deboyne. At least two fighter planes from Shôhô ditched at Deboyne. In addition, one Japanese land-based bomber made an emergency landing in the lagoon on May 7 following its attack on Royal Australian Navy Rear Admiral Crace's task force, which was to the south of Deboyne. Japanese seaplanes flew in and out of the Deboyne base during the Coral Sea battle on reconnaissance and search-and-rescue missions. They particularly concentrated their searches to the south, where American aircraft carriers were expected.

On May 8, a fighter plane from aircraft carrier Zuikaku made an emergency landing in the lagoon. American Army bombers from Port Moresby attacked the seaplane base on May 9, 10 and 11, suffering the loss of one B-25 and one B-26. The Japanese left Deboyne during May 10–12, 1942 and did not return during World War II. The base became untenable for the Japanese due to proximity to Allied airfields at Port Moresby and the failure of MO Sakusen.
