= Misima Island =

Island of Papua New Guinea

Nickname: St. Aignan Island
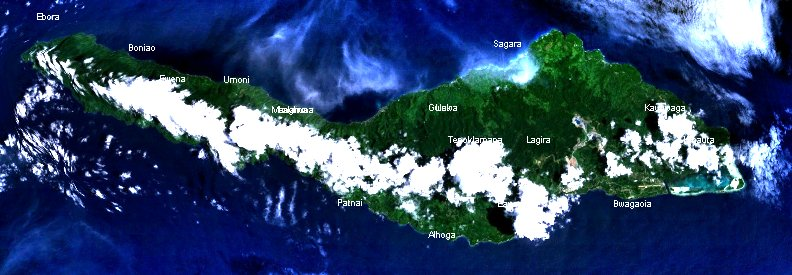
- Misima Island photo

- Location within Papua New Guinea

Geography
- Location: Oceania
- Coordinates: 10°41′S 152°43′E
- Archipelago: Louisiade Archipelago
- Adjacent to: Solomon Sea
- Total islands: 3
- Major islands: Misima; Managun; Gigira
- Area: 215 km^{2} (83 sq mi)
- Length: 40 km (25 mi)
- Width: 10 km (6 mi)
- Highest elevation: 1,036 m (3399 ft)
- Highest point: Mount Koia Tau or Oia Tau First Recorded Ascent:24 December 2016 by Kolbe Bare and two other Misimans

Administration
- Papua New Guinea
- Province: Milne Bay
- District: Samarai-Murua District
- LLG: Louisiade Rural Local Level Government Area
- Island Group: Misima Islands
- Largest settlement: Bwagaoia (pop. 2680)

Demographics
- Population: 19,330 (2014)
- Pop. density: 89.9/km^{2} (232.8/sq mi)
- Ethnic groups: Papauans, Austronesians, Melanesians.

Additional information
- Time zone: AEST (UTC+10)
- ISO code: PG-MBA
- Official website: www.ncdc.gov.pg

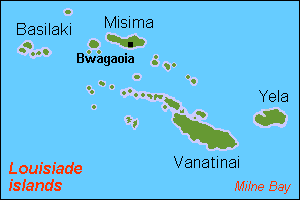
Location within Louisiade Archipelago

Misima Island from space

Misima Mine and Bwagaoia from space

Misima (formerly called St. Aignan) is a volcanic island in the northwest of Louisiade Archipelago within Milne Bay Province of Papua New Guinea.

== History ==
Misima Island was inhabited by Austronesians since about 1500 BC. The island was sighted in 1768 by French captain Louis Antoine de Bougainville and explored 1793 by French explorer Antoine Bruni d'Entrecasteaux. Misima island owes its name to Élisabeth-Paul-Édouard de Rossel, which was a lieutenant of the Counter admiral Antoine Bruny d'Entrecasteaux during his journey of scientific exploration. In 1888 the British Empire annexed Misima Island, and it became part of British New Guinea (since 1904 - the Territory of Papua administered by Australia).

Gold was discovered on Misima late in 1888. By March 1889, eighty men were on the island digging for gold, and a storekeeper had set up a business.

Since 1975, Misima belongs to the independent state of Papua New Guinea. A gold and silver mine was opened on the island in 1990, by an international corporation. The mines provided plenty of work for the islanders. however, that mine was officially closed in 2004, because of excessive load on the environment and public health hazards.

== Politics ==
The island is within the Samarai-Murua District.

== Geography ==
The island measures 40 by 10 km (24.9 by 6.2 mi) and has an area of 2,145 km^{2} (828 sq mi). It is located some 20 km (12 mi) north of the northwest extreme of the barrier reef of Vanatinai at Isu Raua Raua Island, and 80 km (50 mi) northwest of Vanatinai Island itself.

Misima is mountainous and densely forested. Mt. Koia Tau, at a height of 1,036 meters (3,399 ft), is the highest peak of the Louisiade Archipelago.

It was not until 24 December 2016 when Kolbe Bare, a Papua New Guinean geologist, and two Misimans, David Kaliton and Kaliton Ada, made the first recorded ascent to the top of Oia Tau. It was noted by Kolbe at the time of ascent that even though the mountain is close to the sea, higher altitude vegetation covers the top of the mountain.

=== Climate ===
The local climate is tropical, moderated by northeast trade winds, with a dry season from 1 December to 31 May, and a wet season from 1 June to 30 November. It is usually very humid. Since it is fairly close to the equator, the temperature does not fluctuate much between winter and summer.

== Economy ==
Misima island is known as a mining island. A huge mine operated many years on the island. The mine was a joint venture by Placer Dome Inc (owning 80%) and the state-owned Orogen Minerals Ltd. In March 2012 Barrick closed its post closure monitoring office in Bwagaoia having successfully rehabilitated the mine and mill sites.

Since 2004 when the mine closed, artisanal mining has become a major source of income in the island, with an association Misima Alluvial Gold Mining Association (MAGMA) starting in 2007. Other sources of income, especially for people living on the north coast, are cash crops of coconuts, copra, and cacao. A commercial fisheries project has been proposed, but has not been developed yet.

== Demographics ==
The island has a population of 19,330, spread across 78 villages, Misima is the most heavily populated island in the Louisiade Archipelago. By area, it is the third largest, after Vanatinai and Rossel Island. Since the mines have closed, there are signs of population decrease. people are moving to Alotau for jobs.

=== Urbanization ===
The main town of the island and the seat of the district is Bwagaoia, located on the southeast corner of the island. Other villages are Hinauta, Boiou, Gulewa, Bagilina, Liak, Siagara, Eiaus (on the eastern north coast, reachable by road from Bwagaoia), Gulewa and Ewena (on the western north coast), and Bwagabwaga, Gaibobo and Alhoga (on the south coast).

=== Cities ===
Village Name	Ward	Population	Coordinates
Bwagaoia	03 Bwagaoia	2680	10.679228°S 152.846404°E
Balmatana	30 Baimatana	323	10.673647°S 152.866527°E
Hinauta	04 Hinauta	509	10.663595°S 152.860578°E
Lobwa	31 Lobwa	285	10.652514°S 152.852762°E
Gigig	05 Kaubwaga	627	10.64805°S 152.851101°E
Kaubwaga	05 Kaubwaga	504	10.646257°S 152.848137°E
Boiou	06 Boiou	640	10.627445°S 152.814962°E
Ginul	06 Boiou	262	10.62614°S 152.804615°E
Hopitkahin	07 Siagara East	862	10.610698°S 152.791768°E
Kalotawa	08 Siagara West	1024	10.629022°S 152.766261°E
Gulewa	09 Gulewa	768	10.6379°S 152.738°E
Kakamwa	09 Gulewa	329	10.64°S 152.7227°E
Liak	10 Liak	1523	10.65°S 152.703°E
Bagilina	12 Bagilina	636	10.655126°S 152.674738°E
Lalama	12 Bagilina	578	10.649457°S 152.656382°E
Ewena	13 Ewena	516	10.622°S 152.56°E
Ebora	14 Ebora	679	10.62956°S 152.524873°E
Bwana	32 Bwana	138	10.661051°S 152.588471°E
Bwagabwaga	15 Bwagabwaga	535	10.686105°S 152.710968°E
Gigimwani	16 Awaibi	501	10.698386°S 152.695093°E
Awaibi	16 Awaibi	252	10.702186°S 152.70222°E
Bwaeyam	16 Awaibi	1010	10.707154°S 152.71499°E
Alhoga	17 Alhoga	379	10.713743°S 152.741871°E
Lohola	17 Alhoga	300	10.716368°S 152.75533°E
Mwana (Tribes of Eaus River)	18 Eaus North	888	10.675°S 152.753°E
Eaus (Palapa)	19 Eaus South	980	10.696203°S 152.765643°E
Abalouna	19 Eaus South	564	10.696653°S 152.777925°E
Quartz Mountain (Misima mines)	02 Narian	222	10.69°S 152.79°E
Narian	02 Narian	836	10.690259°S 152.812086°E
Gaibobo	20 Gaibobo	731	10.691979°S 152.820156°E

=== Religion ===
About half the population identified themselves as members of a Christian church. see Religion in Papua New Guinea for more info.

=== Language ===
The main language of the island is also called Misiman, though many residents speak English and also Tok Pisin as a third language.

== Education ==
- Bwagaoia Primary School
- Misima Secondary School formally Misima High School
- Siagara Primary School
- Liak Primary School
- Patnai Primary School (Bwagabwaga)

== Transportation ==
Misima Airport Closed. Only Means of transportation out of the island is by sea. News article https://www.postcourier.com.pg/png-air-suspends-all-flight-to-and-from-misima-airport/ Update: 3Million KINA airport upgrade https://www.thenational.com.pg/k3-million-for-misima-airport-upgrade/ locals still traveling by sea date 3rd of January 2024. (Misima has a working airport (IATA: MIS, ICAO: AYMM) (four flights weekly to the mainland (POM via Alotau) through Airlines of Papua New Guinea, and one charter run by Porgera Joint Venture), a high school (grades 7-12), a small market, a few small stores and a clinic/hospital, a post office,--all of which are located in Bwagaoia. There are ferries from Alotau which service Misima Island, costing around K100 (update 2024: K150-K200)and taking 17 (17-19) hours.

== Flora and fauna ==
The following mammals are present on Misima Island:

- Polynesian rat (introduced)
- Wild boar (introduced)
- Eastern common cuscus
- Sugar glider
- Grassland rat
- Eastern rat
- Panniet naked-backed fruit bat
- Island tube-nosed fruit bat
- Small flying fox
- Common blossom bat
- Temminck's trident bat
- Spurred roundleaf bat
- Fawn leaf-nosed bat
- Diadem leaf-nosed bat
- Smaller horseshoe bat
- Misima bat
- Little bent-wing bat
- Miniopterus macrocneme
- Great bent-winged bat
- Common bent-wing bat
- Angulate pipistrelle

Other animals:

- Copiula oxyrhina
