= Pana Tinani =

Island in Papua New Guinea

Pana Tinani Island
Nickname: Joannett Island
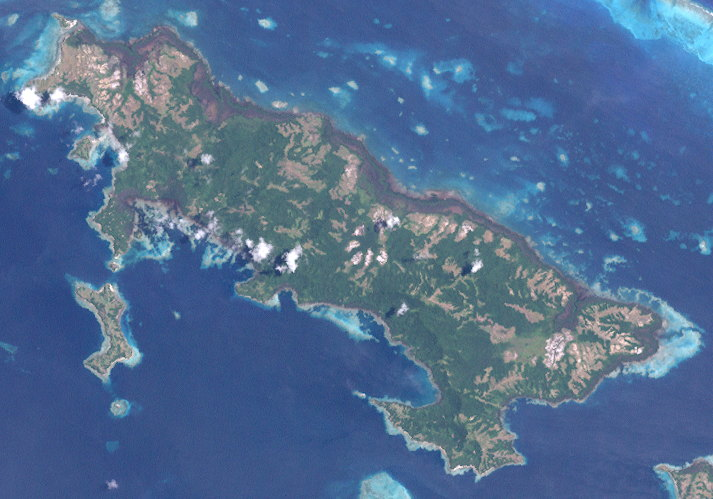

- Location within Papua New Guinea

Geography
- Location: Oceania=
- Coordinates: 11°13′48″S 153°09′32″E
- Archipelago: Louisiade Archipelago
- Adjacent to: Solomon Sea
- Total islands: 1
- Major islands: Pana Tinani
- Area: 78 km^{2} (30 sq mi)
- Length: 19 km (11.8 mi)
- Width: 6 km (3.7 mi)
- Highest elevation: 338 m (1109 ft)
- Highest point: Mount Guyuba

Administration
- Papua New Guinea
- Province: Milne Bay
- District: Samarai-Murua District
- LLG: Yaleyamba Rural Local Level Government Area
- Island Group: Pana Tinani Group
- Largest settlement: Bwailahina (pop. ~200)

Demographics
- Population: 740 (2014)
- Pop. density: 9.5/km^{2} (24.6/sq mi)
- Ethnic groups: Papauans, Austronesians, Melanesians.

Additional information
- Time zone: AEST (UTC+10)
- ISO code: PG-MBA
- Official website: www.ncdc.gov.pg

Pana Tinani (aka Joannett Island), is an island in the Louisiade Archipelago in Milne Bay Province, Papua New Guinea.

== Geography ==
The island has an area of 78 km^{2} (30 sq mi), making it the sixth largest island of the Louisiade Archipelago. The island is hilly, rising to 338 m (1,109 ft) at Mt. Guyuba. The island is 3.1 km (1.9 mi) north of Vanatinai, and separated from it with the Bulami Channel. It is also 100 meters (330 ft) east of Nigao, the easternmost island in the Calvados Chain. separated with the Magamaga Channel.

== History ==
The island was discovered in the late 18th century, named after the wife of the explorer Joannett.

== Population ==
At the census of population in 2014, the island had 740 inhabitants, spread across 11 villages. The main town is Bwailahina (formerly Hebwaun) on the southeast coast. The island's population is administered by 2 wards : Nimoa Ward, Wanim Ward.
