= Wari Island =

Island in Papua New Guinea

Native name: Teste Island
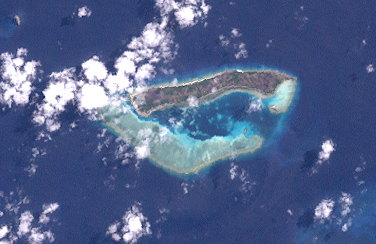
- Wari Island

- Location within Papua New Guinea

Geography
- Location: Oceania
- Coordinates: 10.95°S 151.05°E
- Archipelago: Louisiade Archipelago
- Adjacent to: Solomon Sea
- Total islands: 1
- Major islands: Wari
- Area: 2.27 km^{2} (0.88 sq mi)
- Length: 4.7 km (2.92 mi)
- Width: 0.6 km (0.37 mi)
- Highest elevation: 117 m (384 ft)
- Highest point: Mount Wari

Administration
- Papua New Guinea
- Province: Milne Bay
- District: Samarai-Murua District
- LLG: Louisiade Rural Local Level Government Area \ Yaleyamba Rural LLG \ Bwanabwana
- Island Group: Wari Islands
- Largest settlement: Wari (pop. ~1000)

Demographics
- Population: 1050 (2014)
- Pop. density: 470/km^{2} (1220/sq mi)
- Ethnic groups: Papuans, Austronesians, Melanesians.

Additional information
- Time zone: AEST (UTC+10)
- ISO code: PG-MBA
- Official website: www.ncdc.gov.pg

Wari Island (also known as Teste Island or Ware Island) is an island in the Louisiade Archipelago. Administratively it belongs to Milne Bay Province in the southeastern part of Papua New Guinea.

== History ==
In 2007, archaeologists discovered the Kasasinabwana Shell Midden site on Wari Island, containing plainware pottery dating back approximately 2,800 to 2,300 years. Further excavations in 2008 revealed evidence of the Lapita Cultural Complex, known for its distinctive pottery and as a marker of early Austronesian-speaking peoples' migration across the Pacific.

== Geography ==
The island is located 12 km south-east of the Lebrun Islands and 16 km northwest of the Stuers Islands. Wari is approximately 4.7 km long and up to 630 meters wide. It has an area of 2.27km2. Over the entire length of the island extends a narrow mountain chain that ends in the east and west respectively with a steep peak. The western mountain is 117 m high. A large coral reef is located off the southern coast of Wari. East Islet and South Islet (Kera Kera) are lying on the same coral reef at a distance of 400 and 950 meters respectively. 1.3 km northwest of the western tip of Wari stands an 81 metre-high steep rock out of the sea, Ikaikakeino Island (Cliff Rock). 3.8 km to the northwest is the 133 metre-high rock Mamaramamaweino (Bell Rock). Wari was once forested, but now almost bare, the trees were cut down to make firewood for the population.

== Demographics ==
The last census of the Ward showed a population of 1300. The main village of Wari, with 129 households is on the southwest coast. The central ridge is too mountainous to have villages. the northeast coast has some Bananas and sugarcane plantations in about 20 households spread across a vast area. Other villages and camps are on Kosmann Island.

Most of the population rely on fishing area of the Long / Kosmann reef, more than 100 km to the east, near the Jomard Islands. The villagers share this area with the inhabitants of Utian Island from the Calvados Chain. Another source of income for Wari islanders is harvesting and drying Beche-de-mer or sea cucumbers, which in China and Southeast Asia are considered a delicacy., and are executed there. The largest share of Beche-de-mer is made from Prickly Redfish.

The inhabitants of the archipelago speak Bwanabwana Language.

== History ==
Louis Antoine de Bougainville was the first European to encounter the island on June, 1768.
