= Aleksei Mitin =

Russian footballer

Aleksei Mitin Алексей Митин
Personal information
- Full name: Aleksei Mikhailovich Mitin
- Date of birth: 19 September 1973 (age 53)
- Height: 1.92 m (6 ft 3 1/2 in)
- Position: Goalkeeper

Youth career
- 1990–1991: Partizan Bryansk

Senior career*
Years	Team	Apps	(Gls)
1992–1997	Dynamo Bryansk	74	(0)
1998	Energetik Uren	27	(0)
1999	Torpedo-Kadino Mogilev	9	(0)
1999	Vinnytsia		
2000	Maccabi Jaffa		
2000	Maccabi Kiryat Gat		
2001	Maccabi Ironi Kiryat Ata		
2002–2003	Kristall Smolensk	35	(0)
2004	Zhetysu	14	(0)
2004–2005	SKA-Energiya Khabarovsk	47	(0)
2006–2007	Avangard Kursk	36	(0)
2008	Dynamo Bryansk	11	(0)
2009	Dynamo Vologda	33	(0)
- * Club domestic league appearances and goals

Aleksei Mikhailovich Mitin (Russian: Алексей Михайлович Митин; born 19 September 1973) is a former Russian professional footballer.

== Club career ==
He played 7 seasons in the Russian Football National League for 4 different clubs.
