= Rossel Island =

Island in Papua New Guinea

Native name: Yélî (Yele)
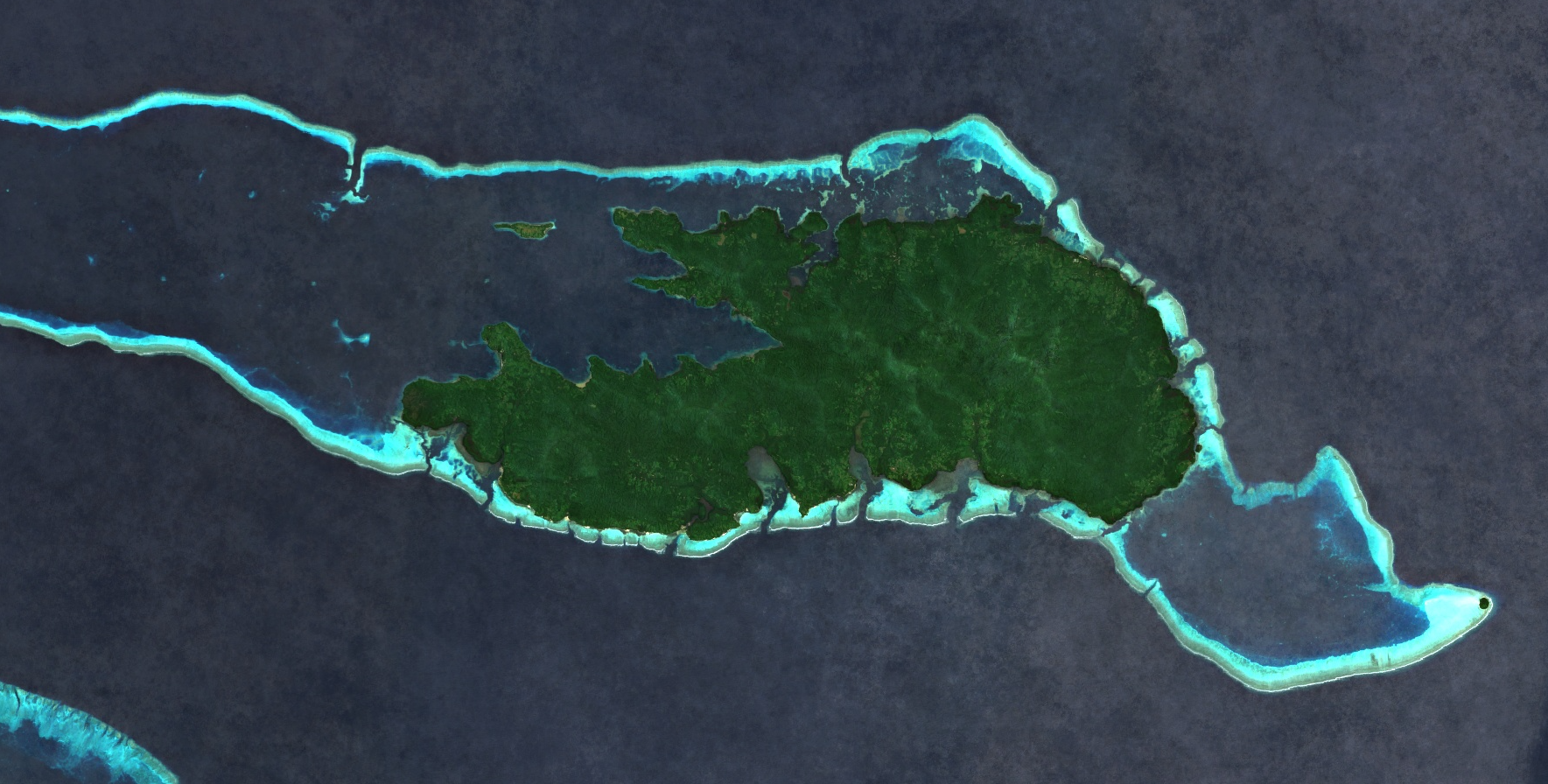
- A composite satellite image of Rossel Island

- Location within Papua New Guinea

Geography
- Location: Oceania
- Coordinates: 11°21′S 154°09′E
- Archipelago: Louisiade Archipelago
- Adjacent to: Solomon Sea
- Total islands: 1
- Major islands: Rossel
- Area: 292.5 km^{2} (112.9 sq mi)
- Length: 34 km (21.1 mi)
- Width: 11 km (6.8 mi)
- Highest elevation: 838 m (2749 ft)
- Highest point: Mount Rossel

Administration
- Papua New Guinea
- Province: Milne Bay
- District: Samarai-Murua District
- LLG: Yaleyamba Rural Local Level Government Area
- Island Group: Rossell Islands
- Largest settlement: Jinjo (pop. ~900)

Demographics
- Population: 5553 (2014)
- Pop. density: 19/km^{2} (49/sq mi)
- Ethnic groups: Papuans, Austronesians, Melanesians.

Additional information
- Time zone: AEST (UTC+10)
- ISO code: PG-MBA

Rossel Island (named after Élisabeth-Paul-Édouard de Rossel, a senior officer on the French expedition of d'Entrecasteaux, 1791–1793; also known as Yela) is the easternmost island of the Louisiade Archipelago, within the Milne Bay Province of Papua New Guinea. Tree Islet is situated 1.5 miles (1.3 nmi; 2.4 km) to the north-west, while Wule Island is situated 1.5 miles (1.3 nmi; 2.4 km) westward.

== Geography ==
The mountainous island measures 34 kilometres (21 mi) east-west, and is up to 11 kilometres (6.8 mi) wide. With an area of 292.5 square kilometres (112.9 sq mi), it is the second largest island of the archipelago, after Vanatinai. The higher parts of the island are almost constantly cloud-capped during the southeast monsoon. The mountain ridges form short, narrow crests, with occasional peaks; their outline is smooth, and the ridges are covered with vegetation. Most of the shoreline is either bordered by mangroves, with occasional sandy beaches, or covered with jungle. From the bluff to the island's north point, very steep hills slope down to the shore. Between the north point of the island and Cape Deliverance are some well-wooded valleys. The south side of the island consists of numerous points and bays, with steep hill ridges descending to the sea from the high mountain range above.

=== Mount Rossel ===
The highest elevation is Mount Rossel, near the eastern end of the island, which rises 838 metres (2,749 ft). This precipitous peak has steep ridges extending to the north and west, but it descends in more gentle slopes southeast to Cape Deliverance, the eastern end of the island. The southwest ridge has two conspicuous peaks each 549 metres (1,801 ft) high. The eastern peak, Mount Mo, is flat-topped. The western peak is conical. At the western end of the island is a conspicuous conical peak 347 metres (1,138 ft) high.

=== Reef ===
The fringing coral reef encloses the large Rossel Lagoon in the west and a smaller lagoon one in the east. Rossel Lagoon extends almost 40 kilometres (22 nmi; 25 mi) from the northwestern point of the island to Rossel Passage at the western end of the fringing reef. The barrier reef encircling this lagoon is narrow and has four passages through it west of the island. The barrier reef on the south side of the island is unbroken east of Rossel Passage. General depths in the lagoon range from 37 to 64 metres (121 to 210 ft), but numerous scattered shoals lie in it. Few of these shoals dry and the larger ones are usually awash. Since the water is so clear the shoals can usually be distinguished in good light.

== Climate ==
Yela island has a tropical rainforest climate (Af) with heavy to very heavy rainfall year-round. The following climate data is for the main settlement of Jinjo.

Climate data for Jinjo
Month	Jan	Feb	Mar	Apr	May	Jun	Jul	Aug	Sep	Oct	Nov	Dec	Year
Mean daily maximum °C (°F)	30.8 (87.4)	31.2 (88.2)	30.7 (87.3)	29.6 (85.3)	29.0 (84.2)	28.4 (83.1)	28.0 (82.4)	28.1 (82.6)	28.7 (83.7)	30.1 (86.2)	30.7 (87.3)	31.2 (88.2)	29.7 (85.5)
Daily mean °C (°F)	27.0 (80.6)	27.4 (81.3)	27.1 (80.8)	26.6 (79.9)	26.2 (79.2)	25.8 (78.4)	25.4 (77.7)	25.5 (77.9)	26.0 (78.8)	26.9 (80.4)	27.2 (81.0)	27.5 (81.5)	26.6 (79.8)
Mean daily minimum °C (°F)	23.4 (74.1)	23.6 (74.5)	23.6 (74.5)	23.6 (74.5)	23.4 (74.1)	23.2 (73.8)	22.9 (73.2)	22.9 (73.2)	23.3 (73.9)	23.7 (74.7)	23.7 (74.7)	23.8 (74.8)	23.4 (74.2)
Average precipitation mm (inches)	311 (12.2)	355 (14.0)	325 (12.8)	377 (14.8)	315 (12.4)	243 (9.6)	229 (9.0)	225 (8.9)	264 (10.4)	285 (11.2)	223 (8.8)	282 (11.1)	3,434 (135.2)
Source: Climate-Data.org

== History ==
Rossel Island was first sighted and charted by Europeans on 14 July 1606 by the Spanish expedition of Luís Vaez de Torres. Together with Tagula Island it was charted as Tierra de San Buenaventura (Land of St. Bonaventure) as it was first sighted on the feast of that saint.

It was named after Elisabeth Paul Eduard de Rossel (1765–1829), French astronomer and Master-at-arms. He was on the frigate Recherche with Joseph Antoine Raymond Bruny d'Entrecasteaux on the search for the missing La Pérouse expedition, which was later written in 1809.

In 1858, the island became notorious after the French ship Saint Paul transporting over 300 Chinese coolies destined for Australia was wrecked on the island. According to the testimony of survivors, the majority of the Chinese were killed and eaten by the native islanders.

=== Rossel Island Shipwrecks ===
==== 1859 St Paul ====
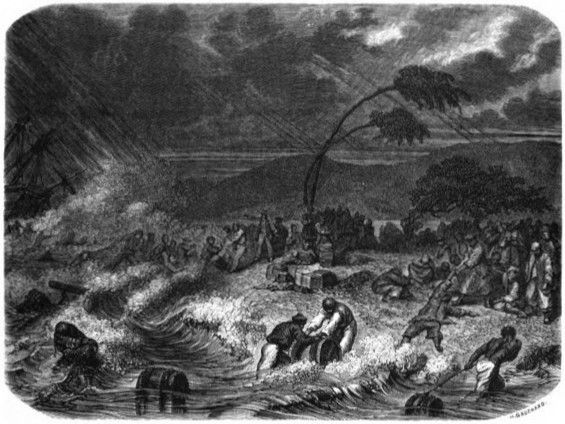
Stranding on the Saint Paul, on Rossel Island

The ship was wrecked on Rossel Island. Nine crew took a boat to seek assistance and were rescued on 15 October by the schooner Prince of Denmark (Flag unknown). The aviso Styx (French Navy) was dispatched from New Caledonia to rescue the survivors, but only managed to rescued one survivor from the remainder of her crew and 327 passengers. Three other survivors (including Narcisse Pelletier) were held captive. The rest had been murdered by the local inhabitants. St. Paul was on a voyage from Hong Kong to Sydney, New South Wales.

==== 1886 Peter ====
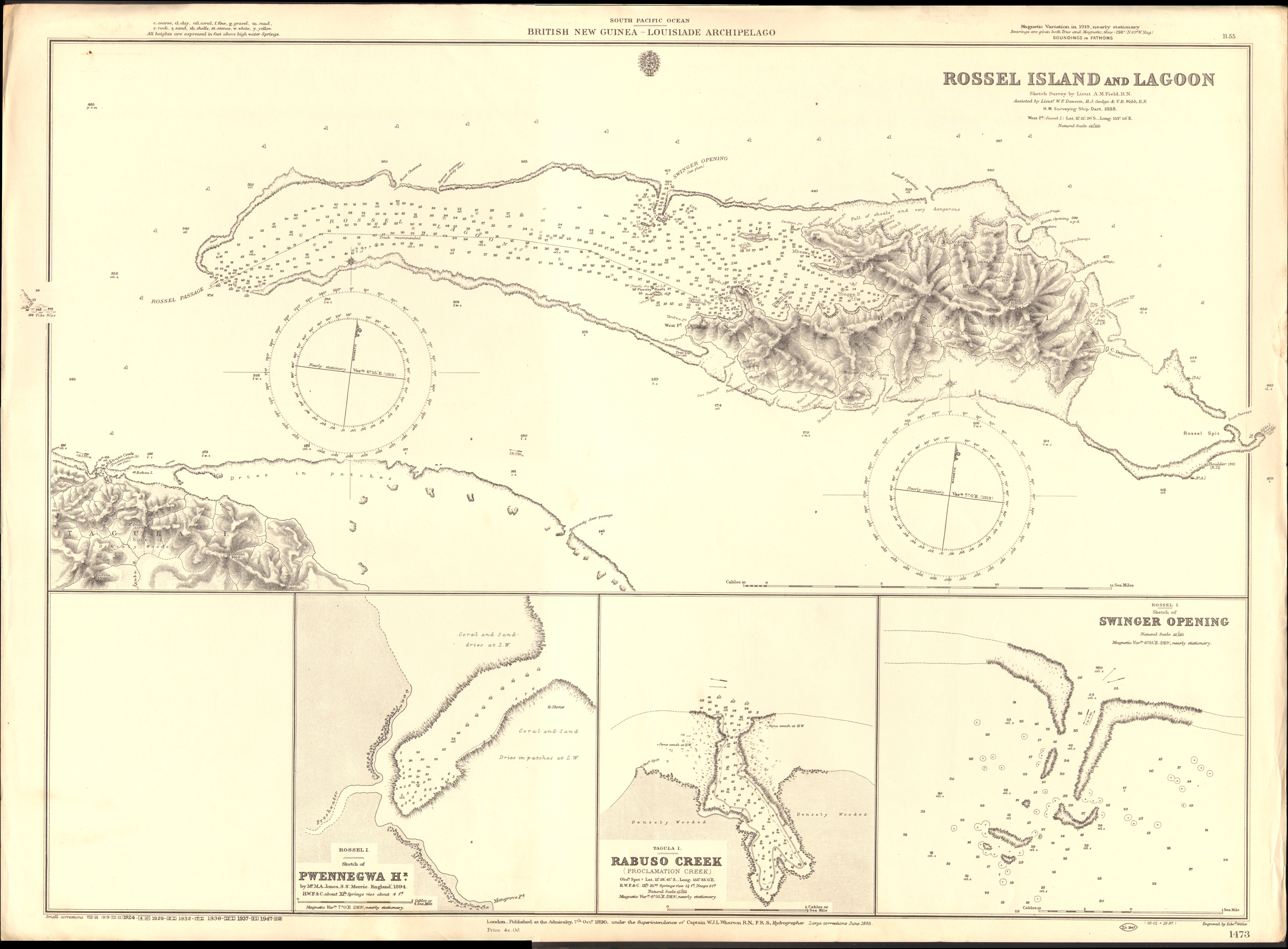
1890 Chart indicating the location of the Peter, on the SE reef of Rossel Island

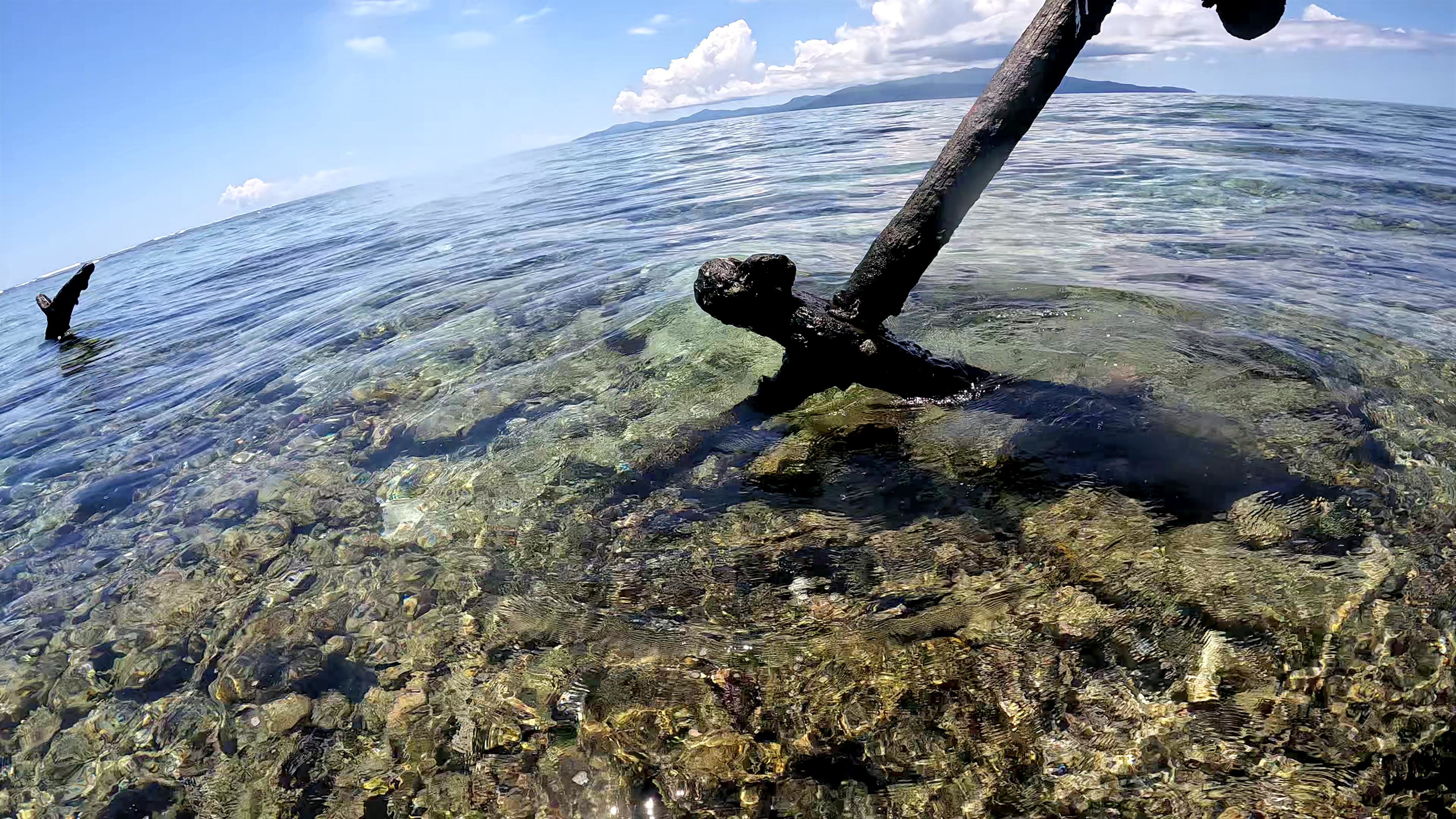
Pair of anchors on Rossel Island wreck site (Admiralty anchor and Trotman anchor)

The three-masted schooner Peter, a German vessel belonging to August Bolten Hamburg was wrecked on the Rossel Island, on August 27, 1886, whilst on a voyage from Hamburg to Finschhafen with a cargo of 300 tons of coal and 5 portable houses for the Governor in Chiefs quarters in New Guinea.

All hands were saved, and after sheltering for several days on Adele Island, situated four miles from the wreck site the crew proceeded in an open boat to Meoko New Britain 500 miles away arriving there on the 13 September.

The Vessel was under command of H Möller when it struck on a dark night at around 9pm. The vessel struck amidships and bumped heavily for a time settling down on its beams ends, with water flowing in and out of the vessel. The crew overnighted on the vessel and then landed on Adele Island. The crew salvaged what they could on the second day but by the third the locals were aboard the vessel. The Peter was a three-masted schooner and had been built in 1874.

The wreck site 11°28.407′S 154°21.437′E consists of 2 admiralty style anchor pulled taught against the reef heading to sea approximately 2/3 of the way back along the taught chain is 3rd anchor and pile of chain with more wreckage heading into the surf zone (including a 4th anchor)

==== 1922 Inaho Maru ====
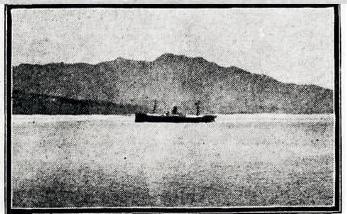
The wreck of the Inaho Maru ashore on Rossel Island 12 January 1922

In December 1921 the Inaho Maru left Japan in ballast bound for Sydney and Melbourne to collect a load of wheat under charter to the Yamashita company. On the 7 January 1922 the vessel ran aground 11°24.427′S 154°20.970′E on the North Eastern Reef of Rossel Island.

By the beginning of March a salvage schooner departed Samarai to proceed to the wreck site and on arrival found that the Inaho Maru had slid off the reef into deeper water.

The Inaho Maru was originally named Morven official number 105957 and was a steel triple expansion screw steamer of 3939 tons and had a length of 344 ft (105 m) with a breadth of 44.5 ft (13.6 m) with a draft of 25.9 ft (7.9 m) built in 1895 by Charles Connell and Company, Scotstoun (Yard No. 221) for Steamship Morven Company Ltd, (James Gardiner & Company, managers) in 1910 the vessel was sold to Itaya Gomei Kaisha, Mitsunosho and renamed Inaho Maru.

==== 1942 SBD Dauntless 2-S-9 ====
On May 7, 1942, as a part of the Battle of the Coral Sea, the USS Lexington (CV-2) launched 53 Douglas SBD Dauntless on a dive bombing mission against the Japanese aircraft carrier Shōhō, One of these SBD's was piloted by then Ensign Anthony J. "Tony" Quigley and Aviation Radioman 3rd Class R.E. Wheelhouse. At 12:40 Ensign Quigley reported one aileron and control wires shot away and his plane became unmanageable by damage from AA fire, unable to return to ship and that he would land on an island probably Rossell at about the same time Lieutenant Commander Robert E. Dixon, commander of VS-2, radioed his famous message to the American carriers: "Scratch one flat top!".

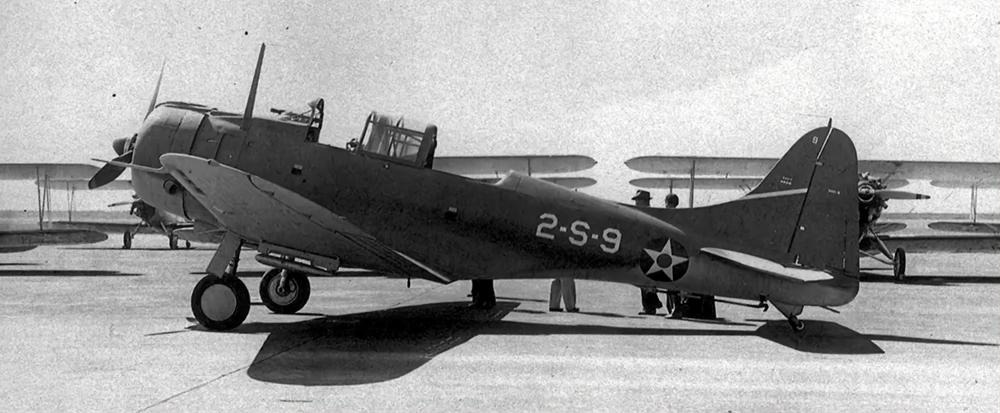
Ensign Quigley's SBD lost at Rossel Island during the Battle of the Coral Sea as it was on 30 September 1941

Quigley was forced to make a crash landing in the lagoon at the western end of Rossell Island both crew members were assisted by locals took them to the plantation house AVALETTI (Osborne Bros plantation) owned by Mr. Osborne.

On May 26, 1942, the Australian vessel MV Laurabada, after an uncomfortable trip passed through the passage in the off-shore reef and anchored off the plantation at 2.pm. Noticed a red S.O.S. painted in red on the roof of the plantation managers house as we came through the passage.

Quigley later reported that "I had just pulled out of a dive," he said, "after releasing a bomb, when Wheelhouse yelled that there‘s was a fighter on our tail and I heard 20mm cannon and saw tracer bulléts. He must have come up from underneath, but I never saw any more of him than his shadow. "He got a lucky hit on our left aileron and it jammed up. The rudder jammed too and I had to give it full right stick to keep in the air".

Because of the plane's condition, the pilot had to make a high—speed landing inside a reef near Rossel Island and was slightly injured by the impact. "I was a little stunned but the Water coming in revived me," he said "We got the rubber boat out and I took the chart aboard. We rowed for 45 minutes but got nowhere because the current was too strong, then saw an outrigger and three of the wildest looking natives you can imagine."

During the 21 days they spent on the Pacific island’ the two stranded airmen lived on a diet of bananas, tea, papaya, watermelon, sweet potatoes, and canned food left behind by‘ previously marooned pilots.

==== 1942 USS S-39 (SS-144) ====
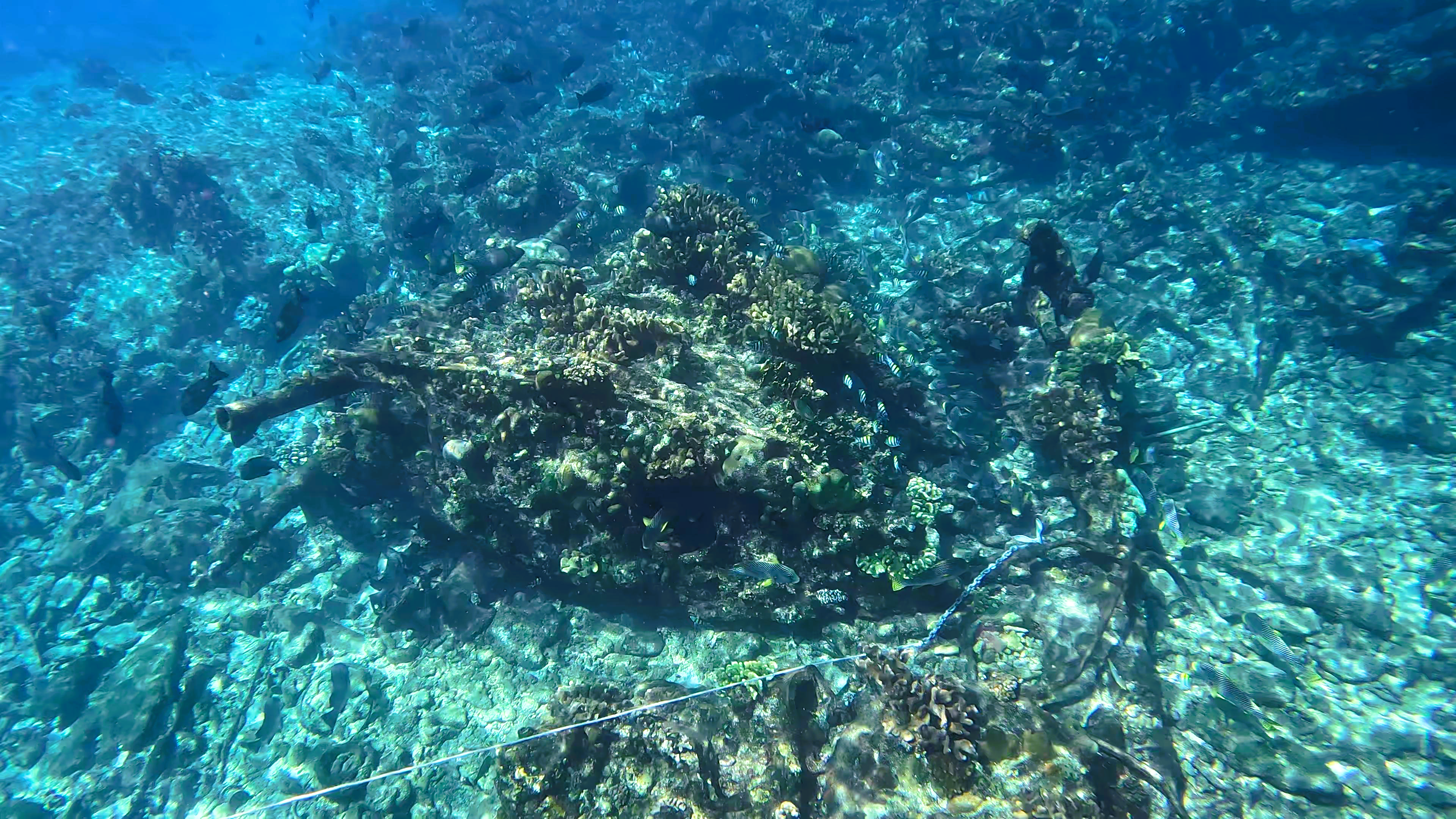
The USS S-39 Conning Tower wreck site at Rossel Island

USS S-39 (SS-144) was a United States Navy S-class submarine that saw combat in the Pacific Theater during World War II. She was accidentally run aground 11°28.522′S 154°21.336′E on her fifth war patrol on the night of 13/14 August 1942 and took on a 35° port list.

S-39 immediately blew ballast tanks dry and jettisoned fuel to lighten ship, then backed emergency, to no avail. Heavy seas pounded her and pushed her farther up on the rocks.

Throughout 14 August, 15–20 ft (4.6–6.1 m) breakers crashed over the submarine, but the crew maintained their fight to refloat the ship, including jettisoning more fuel and firing four deactivated torpedoes.

By 15 August, the list had increased to 60°. The heavy seas had not abated; S-39 continued to be pounded against the rocks, and a call for help brought word that the Australian minesweeper HMAS Katoomba was coming. Katoomba arrived and by the same time the next day had taken all of the crew of S-39 on board. S-39 was left on the rocks, rather than destroyed by gunfire, as her commander was satisfied she would continue breaking up

== Flora and fauna ==
Rossel Island is thickly wooded and nearly the whole south coast is a dense forest. Grassy patches are occasional. Guioa plurinervis (Sapindaceae) and the Louisiade pitta are endemic to this island.

Rosselia, which is a genus of plants in the family Burseraceae and native to New Guinea, was named after the island.

== Demographics ==
In 2014, the population was 5,553, spread across 31 villages. The main village is Jinjo, on the east coast. The indigenous people speak the Yélî Dnye language, whose relation to other languages remains uncertain.
