= Watts Island =

Island in the Chesapeake Bay

- Location within Virginia Location within the United States

Geography
- Location: Accomack County, Virginia; Chesapeake Bay
- Coordinates: 37.800°N 75.894°W
- Area: 200 acres (81 ha)

Watts Island is an island in the Chesapeake Bay administered by Accomack County, Virginia. The island supported small populations from the mid-1600s until the 1920s, and it has decreased in size over time. Recent reporting suggests the island is a habitat for a variety of wildlife.

== History ==
The island was, along with nearby Tangier, sighted in 1608 by John Smith. He called the region the "Russel Isles", though whether this name was applied to Watts, Tangier, or both is unknown. It was claimed in 1652, and by 1685 Henry Jenkins had received a patent and was grazing livestock on it. Around 1800 the island had 15 inhabitants, composed of Robert Parker's family and their five slaves. In 1832, Josiah Parker sold a small island south of Watts ("Little Watts Island") to the federal government, and in 1833 the Watts Island Light was built upon it. Adam Wallace noted in his 1861 biography of Joshua Thomas that Watts Island was home to three families. Much of the forest on the island was cut down during the American Civil War for use as firewood or boatmaking; erosion washed part of the island's southern end away shortly thereafter.

In the 17th century, the island was a base for piracy. The island was used by pirate Roger Makeele as a lair until Makeele was driven out to North Carolina by Virginia governor Francis Howard. During the War of 1812, the island was occupied by the British.

The island was briefly uninhabited from 1908–1910, as Harry and Arinthia Doremus, the last two residents, moved out. Charles Hardenberg, a Princeton University law student, moved onto the island in 1910 and lived there as a hermit until 1920. He lived briefly in Georgia until returning to live for an even longer time on Little Watts Island. In 1962, G.R. Klinefelter purchased the island for $7,600 and moved the headstones on the island to Port Isobel (which he also owned), adjacent to Tangier.

In 1971, The News & Advance reported that the island had been completely deserted and was home to a population of wild goats. A 1992 article in The Baltimore Sun indicated that the island was a haven for bird life, including herons, osprey, and glossy ibis.
