= Panaeati Island =

Island in Papua New Guinea

- Location within Papua New Guinea

Geography
- Location: Oceania
- Coordinates: 10°41′S 152°22′E
- Archipelago: Louisiade Archipelago
- Adjacent to: Solomon Sea
- Total islands: 1
- Major islands: Panaeati
- Area: 30.32 km^{2} (11.71 sq mi)
- Highest elevation: 213 m (699 ft)
- Highest point: Mount Deboyne

Administration
- Papua New Guinea
- Province: Milne Bay
- District: Samarai-Murua District
- LLG: Louisiade Rural Local Level Government Area
- Island Group: Deboyne Islands
- Largest settlement: Bwaganati (pop. 500)

Demographics
- Population: 2080 (2014)
- Pop. density: 68.6/km^{2} (177.7/sq mi)
- Ethnic groups: Papauans, Austronesians, Melanesians.

Additional information
- Time zone: AEST (UTC+10)
- ISO code: PG-MBA
- Official website: www.ncdc.gov.pg

Panaeati Island is an island of Papua New Guinea. It is in the Deboyne Islands atoll in the Louisiade Archipelago.
