= Yaleyamba Rural LLG =

Local-level government in Papua New Guinea

- Country: Papua New Guinea
- Province: Milne Bay Province
- District: Samarai-Murua District
- Time zone: UTC+10 (AEST)

Yaleyamba Rural LLG is a local-level government (LLG) of Milne Bay Province, Papua New Guinea. The LLG is situated in the eastern part of Louisiade Archipelago with Rossel and Vanatinai islands.
