= Tagula Island =

Island in Papua New Guinea

Vanatinai Island
Nickname: Sudest Island / Tagula Island
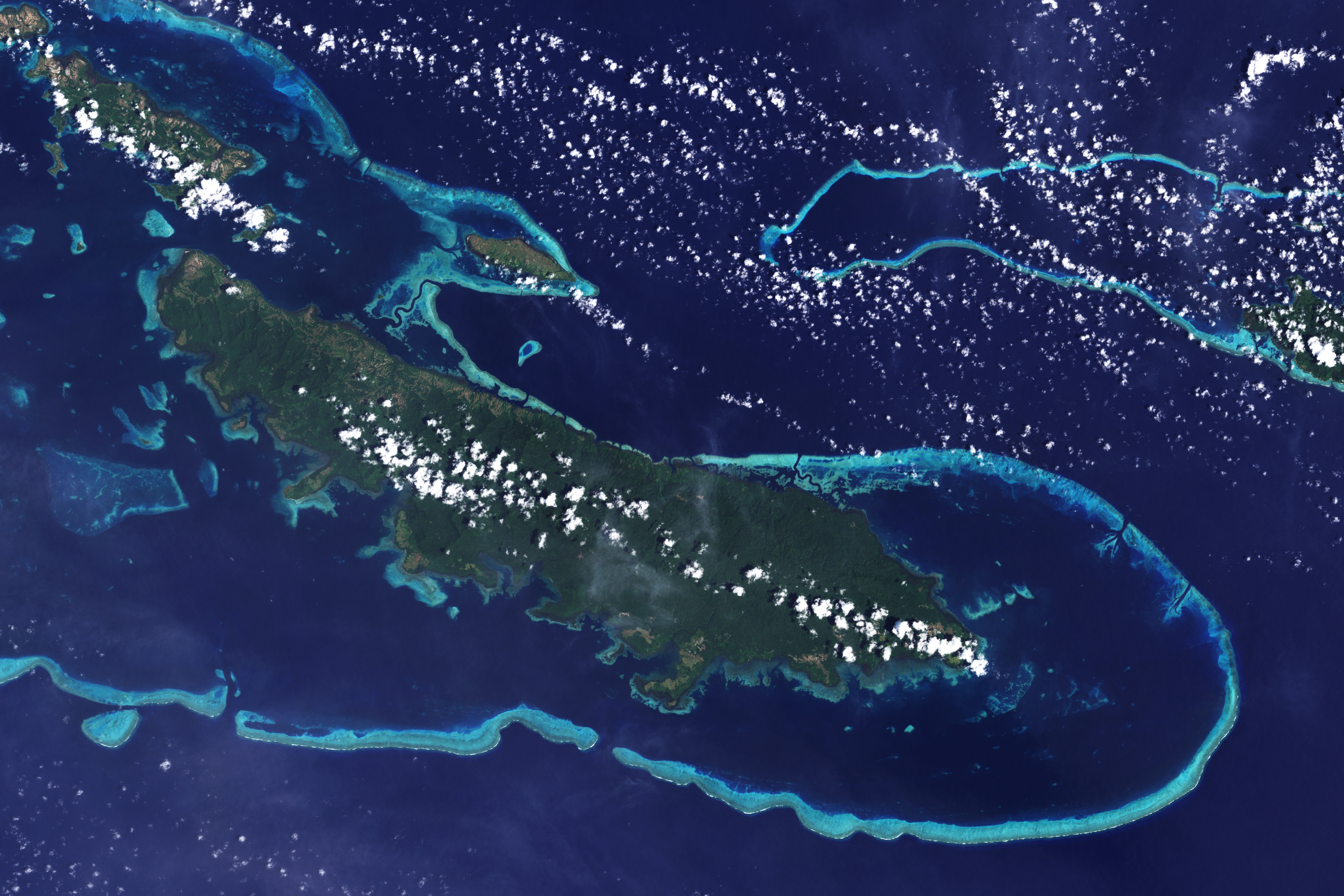
- Tagula Island as seen from space. Yeina Island is also visible to the north (top).

- Location within Papua New Guinea

Geography
- Location: Oceania
- Coordinates: 11°30′S 153°26′E
- Archipelago: Louisiade Archipelago
- Adjacent to: Solomon Sea
- Total islands: 1
- Major islands: Tagula Island
- Area: 830 km^{2} (320 sq mi)
- Length: 63 km (39.1 mi)
- Width: 13 km (8.1 mi)
- Highest elevation: 806 m (2644 ft)
- Highest point: Mount Riu

Administration
- Papua New Guinea
- Province: Milne Bay
- District: Samarai-Murua District
- LLG: Yaleyamba Rural Local Level Government Area
- Island Group: Vanatinai Islands
- Largest settlement: Rambuso (pop. ~500)

Demographics
- Population: 3628 (2014)
- Pop. density: 4.37/km^{2} (11.32/sq mi)
- Ethnic groups: Papuans, Austronesians, Melanesians

Additional information
- Time zone: AEST (UTC+10)
- ISO code: PG-MBA
- Official website: www.ncdc.gov.pg

Vanatinai Island (also called Tagula and Sudest, for the names of the extreme capes of the island) is a volcanic island in the southeast of the Louisiade Archipelago within Milne Bay Province of Papua New Guinea. The reef-fringed island is approximately 360 kilometres (224 miles) southeast of New Guinea and 30 kilometres (19 miles) south of Misima. With an area of 830 square kilometres (320.5 square miles), it is the largest island of the archipelago. Tagula town, the main settlement, is located on the northwest coast. The population was 3,628 as of 2014. The principal export is copra.

== Geography ==
The island is 63 kilometres (39 miles) long, stretching from Cape Tagula to Cape Sudest, and up to 13 km (8.1 miles) wide. A wooded mountain range runs through the length of the island, with the summit, Mount Riu (806 metres or 2,644 feet) near the center. The most important peaks of the range are, from west to east:

- Mount Madau (269 metres or 883 feet)
- Mount Gangulua (439 metres or 1,440 feet)
- Mount Riu (formerly called Mount Rattlesnake) (806 metres or 2,644 feet)
- Mount Imau (485 metres or 1,591 feet)
- Mount Arumbi (350 metres or 1,150 feet)

== Climate ==
Most of Tagula island has a tropical rainforest climate (Af) but the main settlement of Tagula, located in the northernmost and driest part of the island, has a tropical monsoon climate (Am).

Climate data for Tagula town
| Month | Jan | Feb | Mar | Apr | May | Jun | Jul | Aug | Sep | Oct | Nov | Dec | Year |
|---|---|---|---|---|---|---|---|---|---|---|---|---|---|
| Mean daily maximum °C (°F) | 31.0 (87.8) | 31.3 (88.3) | 30.8 (87.4) | 29.4 (84.9) | 28.8 (83.8) | 28.0 (82.4) | 27.9 (82.2) | 27.8 (82.0) | 28.6 (83.5) | 29.9 (85.8) | 30.6 (87.1) | 31.3 (88.3) | 29.6 (85.3) |
| Daily mean °C (°F) | 27.2 (81.0) | 27.4 (81.3) | 27.2 (81.0) | 26.4 (79.5) | 26.1 (79.0) | 25.5 (77.9) | 25.5 (77.9) | 25.3 (77.5) | 26.0 (78.8) | 26.8 (80.2) | 27.1 (80.8) | 27.5 (81.5) | 26.5 (79.7) |
| Mean daily minimum °C (°F) | 23.4 (74.1) | 23.6 (74.5) | 23.6 (74.5) | 23.5 (74.3) | 23.4 (74.1) | 23.1 (73.6) | 23.1 (73.6) | 22.9 (73.2) | 23.4 (74.1) | 23.8 (74.8) | 23.7 (74.7) | 23.8 (74.8) | 23.4 (74.2) |
| Average precipitation mm (inches) | 215 (8.5) | 249 (9.8) | 218 (8.6) | 217 (8.5) | 138 (5.4) | 60 (2.4) | 71 (2.8) | 52 (2.0) | 88 (3.5) | 106 (4.2) | 112 (4.4) | 170 (6.7) | 1,696 (66.8) |
Source: Climate-Data.org

== History ==
The first recorded sighting by Europeans of Vanatinai Island was by the Spanish expedition of Luís Vaez de Torres on 14 July 1606.

The island was the site of a gold rush that began in 1888 and peaked in 1889. Gold was found in nearly all of the island's water courses.

Rambuso Village is located on the north coast of the eastern part of the island, where Rambuso Creek flows into the Pacific Ocean. Entry through the reef to the harbour is deep and easy to see during daylight. Many visiting yachts and local trading boats use this protected anchorage. In 2010 the villagers and several visiting yachties rebuilt the wharf and causeway. The villagers new slogan is "Rambuso Creek the gateway to Sudest". The new wharf helped Rambuso develop and now the busy town has some 500 citizens.

== Transportation ==
The island has an airport, code (IATA-Code „TGL“) for public transport, near Tagula village.

== Biodiversity ==
Several species are endemic to the island, including the aptly named Tagula white-eye, Tagula honeyeater and Tagula butcherbird. Among frogs, Cophixalus tagulensis is only known from Tagula.
