= Solomon Sea =

Sea in the Pacific Ocean between Papua New Guinea and Solomon Islands

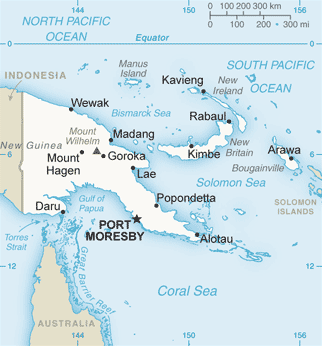
- Solomon Sea

- Location within Papua New Guinea
- Location: Oceania
- Coordinates: 8°S 154°E
- Type: Sea
- Part of: Pacific Ocean
- Basin countries: Papua New Guinea and Solomon Islands
- Surface area: 720,000 km^{2} (280,000 sq mi)

The Solomon Sea is a sea located within the Pacific Ocean. It lies between Papua New Guinea and Solomon Islands. Many major battles were fought there during World War II.

== Extent ==
The International Hydrographic Organization defines the limits of the Solomon Sea as follows:

On the Northwest. By the Southeast limit of Bismarck Sea [A line from the Southern point of New Ireland along the parallel of 4°50' South to the coast of New Britain, along its Northern coast and thence a line from its Western extreme through the Northern point of Umboi Island to Teliata Point, New Guinea (5°55′S 147°24′E)].

On the Northeast. By a line from the Southern point of New Ireland to the North point of Buka Island, through this island to the Northwest point of Bougainville Island, along the Southern coasts of Bougainville, Choisel [Choiseul], Ysabel [Santa Isabel], Malaita and San Cristobal [Makira] Islands.

On the South. The Northern limit of the Coral Sea between San Cristobal Island, Solomon Islands, and Gado-Gadoa Island, off the Southeast extreme of New Guinea [Gado-Gadoa Island near its Southeastern extreme (10°38′S 150°34′E), down this meridian to the 100-fathom [600 ft; 183 m] line and thence along the Southern edges of Uluma (Suckling) Reef and those extending to the Eastward as far as the Southeast point of Lawik Reef (11°43.5′S 153°56.5′E) off Tagula Island [Vanatinai], thence a line to the Southern extreme of Rennell Island and from its Eastern point to Cape Surville, the Eastern extreme of San Cristobal Island].

On the Southwest. By the coast of New Guinea and a line from its Southeasternmost point through the Louisiade Archipelago to Rossel Island.

== Etymology ==
The Solomon Sea is named after the Solomon Islands archipelago. These islands received their name "Islas Salomón" from the legend of the biblical land of Ophir — fabled as the source of King Solomon's wealth which was hoped to be discovered, in the first 1568 voyage by their discoverer Spanish navigator Álvaro de Mendaña de Neira. They were so named after his voyage when it was mapped.

== Deepest point ==
The Solomon Sea roughly corresponds with the Solomon Sea plate, a tectonic feature, and includes the New Britain Trench, in the New Britain subduction zone, which reaches its maximum depth at 29,988 feet (9,140 m) below sea level in the Planet Deep.
