= Duchateau Islands =

Island group in Papua New Guinea

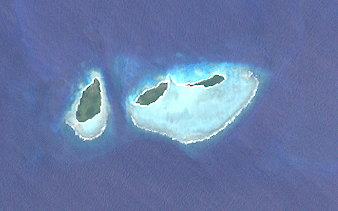
- (From left to right) Pana Bobai Ana, Pana Rura Wara and Kukuluba

- Location within Papua New Guinea

Geography
- Location: Oceania
- Coordinates: 11°17′45″S 152°22′18″E
- Archipelago: Louisiade Archipelago
- Adjacent to: Solomon Sea
- Total islands: 3 uninhabited
- Major islands: Pana Bobai Ana; Pana Rura Wara; Kukuluba
- Area: 1.49 km^{2} (0.58 sq mi)

Administration
- Papua New Guinea
- Province: Milne Bay
- District: Samarai-Murua District
- LLG: Louisiade Rural Local Level Government Area
- Island Group: Duchateau Islands
- Largest island: Pana Bobai Ana

Demographics
- Population: 0 (2014)
- Pop. density: 0/km^{2} (0/sq mi)
- Ethnic groups: Papauans, Austronesians, Melanesians.

Additional information
- Time zone: AEST (UTC+10)
- ISO code: PG-MBA
- Official website: www.ncdc.gov.pg

The Duchateau Islands are an island group in the Coral Sea, belonging to Papua New Guinea. They lie to the east of Panarairai Island in the Louisiade Archipelago. They are named after a French naval administrator, Gustave Bertin-Duchateau.

== Administrative ==
Politically they belong to the province of Milne Bay in the southeastern part of Papua New Guinea. They are controlled by the chief of Utian Island, the nearest inhabited island.

== Geography ==
The Duchateau Islands consist of three small low-lying islands. They lie on the southwestern edge of the barrier reef of Vanatinai. The highest point is 75 feet (23 m). They are located 5 kilometres (3.1 mi) south-east of the Jomard Islands and immediately northeast of Montemont Islands. Of the three islands, Pana Bobai Ana (75 hectares [190 acres]) in the west is the largest. It was formerly inhabited (village of Salunol) but the people have moved to Utian. they come each year back to the island to harvest yams and claim coconuts. The two smaller islands, Pana Rura Wara (42 hectares [100 acres]) and Kukuluba (32 hectares [79 acres]), are located on the north side of their shared lagoon.
