= Montemont Islands =

Island group in Papua New Guinea

- Location within Papua New Guinea

Geography
- Location: Oceania
- Coordinates: 11°18′14″S 152°17′21″E
- Archipelago: Louisiade Archipelago
- Adjacent to: Solomon Sea
- Total islands: 2 uninhabited
- Major islands: Pana Boba; Pana Iatui
- Area: 0.12 km^{2} (0.046 sq mi)

Administration
- Papua New Guinea
- Province: Milne Bay
- District: Samarai-Murua District
- LLG: Louisiade Rural Local Level Government Area
- Island Group: Duchateau Islands
- Largest island: Pana Boba

Demographics
- Population: 0 (2014)
- Pop. density: 0/km^{2} (0/sq mi)
- Ethnic groups: Papauans, Austronesians, Melanesians.

Additional information
- Time zone: AEST (UTC+10)
- ISO code: PG-MBA
- Official website: www.ncdc.gov.pg

The Montemont Islands are an island group in the Coral Sea, belonging to Papua New Guinea. They lie to the east of Panarairai Island in the Louisiade Archipelago. They are named after a French travel writer Albert Montémont.

== Administrative ==
Politically they belong to the province of Milne Bay in the southeastern part of Papua New Guinea. They are controlled by the chief of Utian Island, the nearest inhabited island.

== Geography ==
The Montemont Islands consists of two small low-lying islands. They lie on the southwestern edge of the barrier reef of Vanatinai. They are located 3 kilometres (1.9 mi) south-east of the Jomard Islands and immediately west of the Duchateau Islands. Of the two islands, Pana Boba in the east, at 10 hectares (25 acres), is the larger.
