= Panasia =

Island in Papua New Guinea

Panasia Island
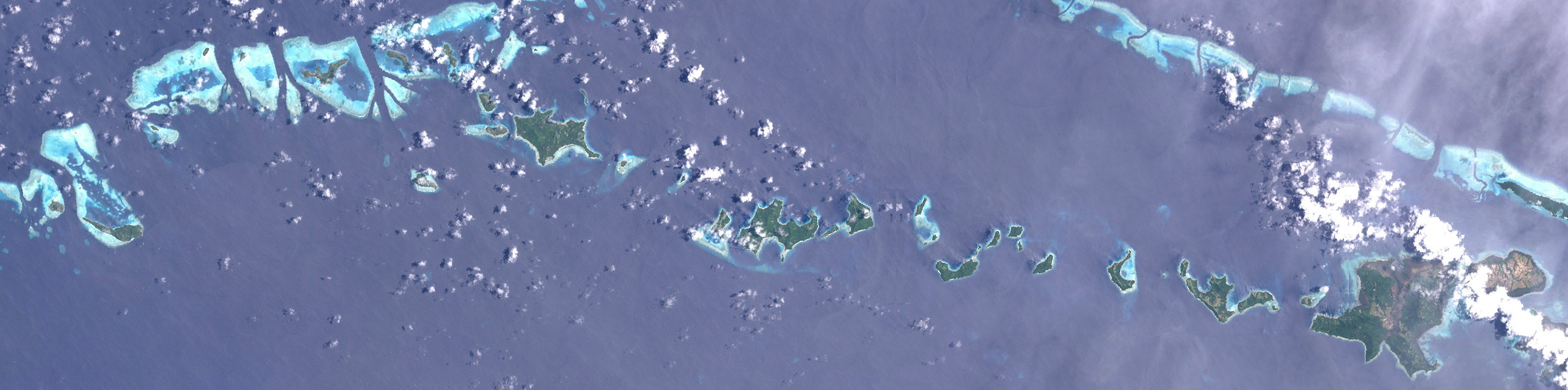
- Satellite image

- Location within Papua New Guinea

Geography
- Location: Oceania
- Coordinates: 11°10′S 153°05′E
- Archipelago: Louisiade Archipelago
- Adjacent to: Solomon Sea
- Total islands: 1
- Major islands: Panasia
- Area: 2.11 km^{2} (0.81 sq mi)
- Highest elevation: 165 m (541 ft)
- Highest point: Mount Panasia

Administration
- Papua New Guinea
- Province: Milne Bay
- District: Samarai-Murua District
- LLG: Louisiade Rural LLG
- Island Group: Calvados Chain
- Largest settlement: Panasia

Demographics
- Population: 0 (2014)
- Pop. density: 0/km^{2} (0/sq mi)
- Ethnic groups: Papauans, Austronesians, Melanesians.

Additional information
- Time zone: AEST (UTC+10)
- ISO code: PG-MBA
- Official website: www.ncdc.gov.pg

Panasia Island is an island in Papua New Guinea, part of the Calvados Chain within the Louisiade Archipelago. It is located at the western end of the Calvados Chain, in the Louisiade Archipelago, in the Milne Bay Province, next to Pana Varavara. Utian islanders use this island for gardening yams.
