= Hastings Island =

Hastings Island may refer to:

- Hastings Island (Papua New Guinea)
- Hastings Island (Western Australia)
- Hastings Island (Myanmar), in the Mergui Archipelago
