= Sloss Islands =

Island

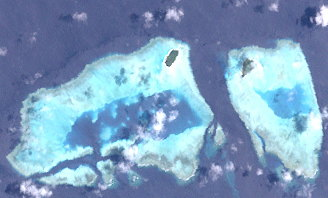
- Rara (left) and Pana Roba (right)

- Location within Papua New Guinea

Geography
- Location: Oceania
- Coordinates: 11°03′48″S 152°23′32″E
- Archipelago: Louisiade Archipelago
- Adjacent to: Solomon Sea
- Total islands: 2
- Major islands: Rara; Pana Roba
- Area: 0.36 km^{2} (0.14 sq mi)
- Highest elevation: 35 m (115 ft)
- Highest point: Rara

Administration
- Papua New Guinea
- Province: Milne Bay
- District: Samarai-Murua District
- LLG: Louisiade Rural LLG
- Island Group: Calvados Chain
- Largest settlement: Rara (pop. 0)

Demographics
- Population: 0 (2014)
- Ethnic groups: Papauans, Austronesians, Melanesians.

Additional information
- Time zone: AEST (UTC+10)
- ISO code: PG-MBA
- Official website: www.ncdc.gov.pg

The Sloss Islands are an uninhabited archipelago in Louisiade Archipelago.

The Sloss Islands belong to the Calvados Chain. They are densely vegetation-covered coral islands located 6 kilometres (3.7 miles) west of Utian Island and 12 kilometres (7.5 miles) northeast of Pana Varavara.

The archipelago consists of two islands, Rara (19 ha ) and Pana Roba (17 ha). The highest elevation on Rara is 35 metres (115 feet). The island is located on the northeast side of Tawal-reef. Pana Roba is on the northwest side of the reef and up to 33 metres (108 feet). Rara, previously inhabited, is now being used as fishermen huts for the men departing from Utian Island. The men are also claiming coconuts on both islands.
