= Bobo Eina Island =

Island In Papua New Guinea

Bobo Eina
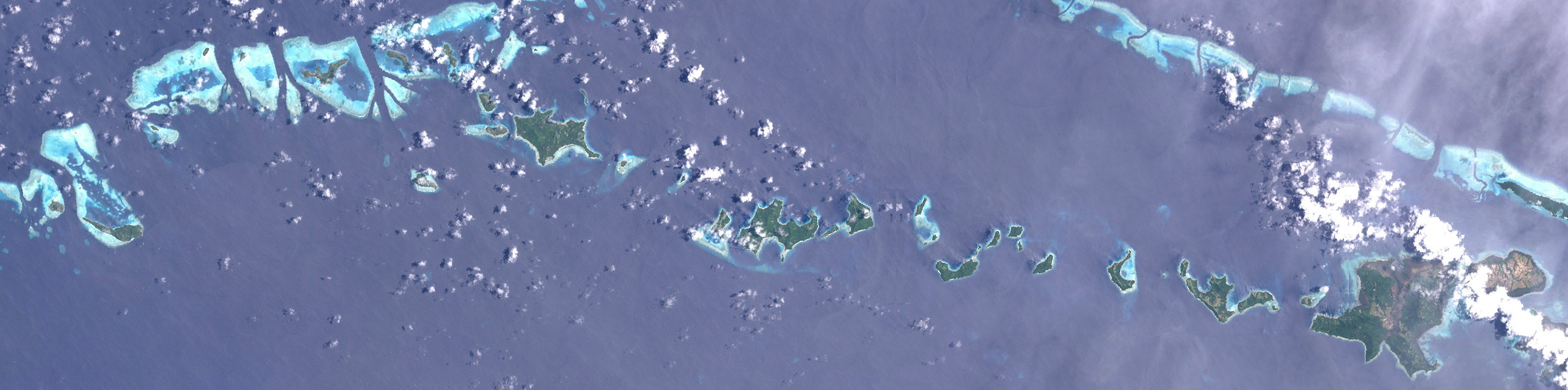
- Satellite image

- Location within Papua New Guinea

Geography
- Location: Oceania
- Coordinates: 11°08′S 152°44′E
- Archipelago: Louisiade Archipelago
- Adjacent to: Solomon Sea
- Total islands: 1
- Major islands: Bobo Eina
- Area: 2.43 km^{2} (0.94 sq mi)
- Highest elevation: 245 m (804 ft)
- Highest point: Mount Bobo Eina

Administration
- Papua New Guinea
- Province: Milne Bay
- District: Samarai-Murua District
- LLG: Louisiade Rural LLG
- Island Group: Calvados Chain
- Largest settlement: Bobo Eina

Demographics
- Population: 2 (2014)
- Pop. density: 0.8/km^{2} (2.1/sq mi)
- Ethnic groups: Papauans, Austronesians, Melanesians.

Additional information
- Time zone: AEST (UTC+10)
- ISO code: PG-MBA
- Official website: web.archive.org/web/20101223043232/http://oceandots.com/pacific/png/deboyne.php

Bobo Eina Island is an island in Papua New Guinea, part of the Calvados Chain within the Louisiade Archipelago. It is located near Bagaman Island. It is used as a fishermen camp for the men of Bagaman. In recent years, Bagaman islanders use Bobo Eina for gardening yams, and have also established a pig farm on the island.
