= Pana Numara =

Island in Papua New Guinea

Native name: Pana Umala
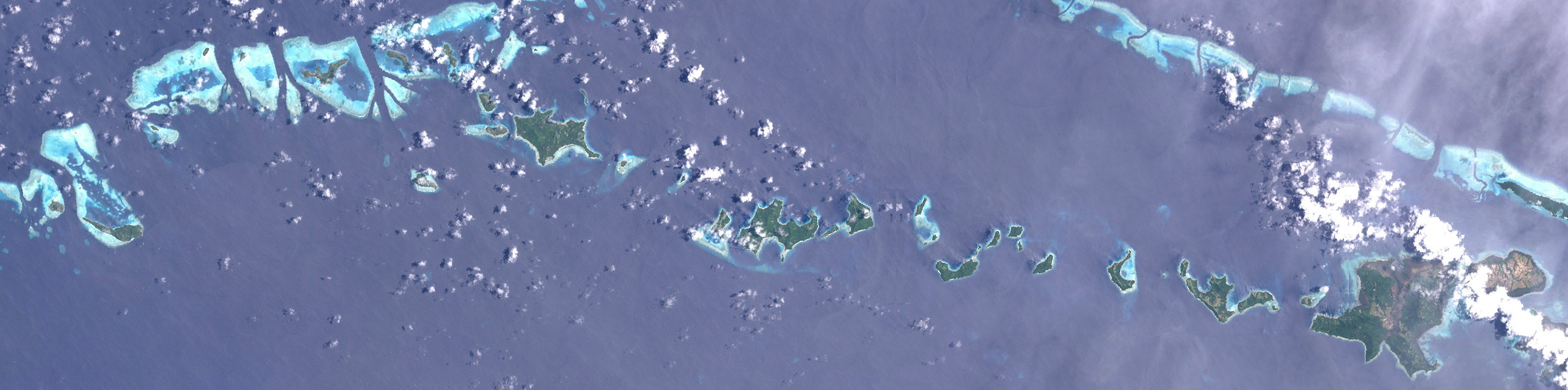
- Satellite image

- Location within Papua New Guinea

Geography
- Location: Oceania
- Coordinates: 11°10′S 152°47′E
- Archipelago: Louisiade Archipelago
- Adjacent to: Solomon Sea
- Total islands: 1
- Major islands: Pana Numara
- Area: 1.93 km^{2} (0.75 sq mi)
- Highest elevation: 131 m (430 ft)
- Highest point: Mount Pana Numara

Administration
- Papua New Guinea
- Province: Milne Bay
- District: Samarai-Murua District
- LLG: Louisiade Rural LLG
- Island Group: Calvados Chain
- Largest settlement: Hoba Bay (pop. 100)

Demographics
- Population: 183 (2014)
- Pop. density: 95/km^{2} (246/sq mi)
- Ethnic groups: Papauans, Austronesians, Melanesians.

Additional information
- Time zone: AEST (UTC+10)
- ISO code: PG-MBA
- Official website: www.ncdc.gov.pg

Pana Numara Island is an island in Papua New Guinea, part of the Calvados Chain within the Louisiade Archipelago. It is located at the middle of the Calvados Chain, in the Louisiade Archipelago, in the Milne Bay Province.
