= Bonvouloir Islands =

Island group in Papua New Guinea

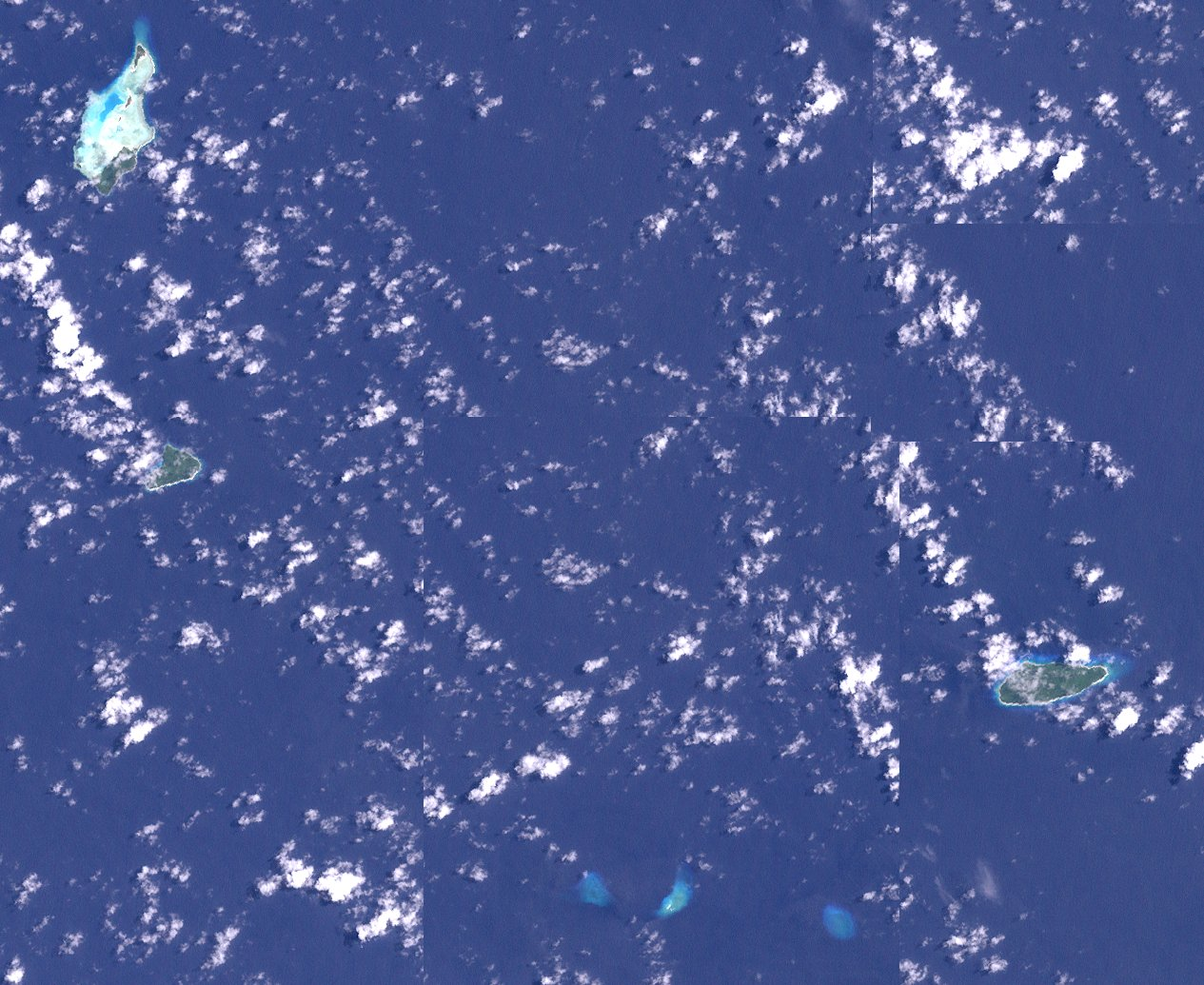
- Strathord Islands and Hastings Island in the upper left, East Island in the lower right

- Location within Papua New Guinea

Geography
- Location: Oceania
- Coordinates: 10°21′S 152°00′E
- Archipelago: Louisiade Archipelago
- Adjacent to: Solomon Sea
- Total islands: 7
- Major islands: East; Panamole; Hastings
- Area: 5.54 km^{2} (2.14 sq mi)
- Highest elevation: 300 m (1000 ft)
- Highest point: Mount Hastings

Administration
- Papua New Guinea
- Province: Milne Bay
- District: Samarai-Murua District
- LLG: Louisiade Rural Local Level Government Area
- Island Group: Bonvouloir Islands
- Largest island: East

Demographics
- Population: 0 (2014)
- Ethnic groups: Papauans, Austronesians, Melanesians.

Additional information
- Time zone: AEST (UTC+10)
- ISO code: PG-MBA
- Official website: www.ncdc.gov.pg

The Bonvouloir Islands are a group of uninhabited islands of Papua New Guinea. They are in the Louisiade Archipelago. The islands are located 100 kilometres (62 miles) northwest of Misima and form the northernmost group of the Louisiade Archipelago. The main islands are East Island, Panamole Island (Strathord Islands) and Hastings Island

East Island is located 26 kilometres (16 miles) to the southeast of Hastings Island, and Panamole Island is located 9 kilometres (5.6 miles) to the north of Hastings Island. The islands are densely wooded and rocky, and Hastings Island has 200-metre-high (660 ft) cliffs and many caves.
