= Pana Wina Island =

Island of Papua New Guinea

Panawina Island
Nickname: Kaluma Island
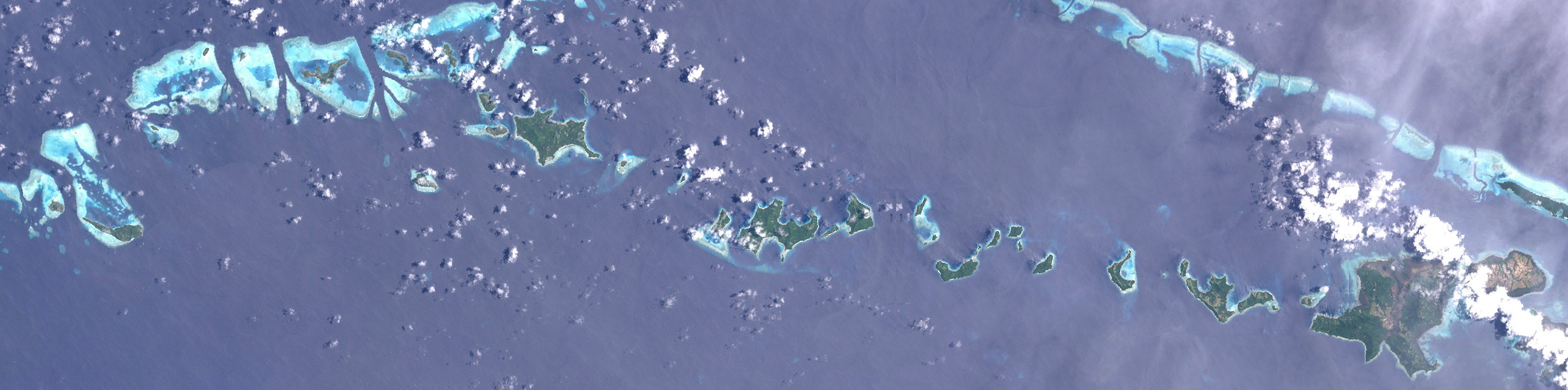
- Satellite image

- Location within Papua New Guinea

Geography
- Location: Oceania
- Coordinates: 11°10′S 153°00′E
- Archipelago: Louisiade Archipelago
- Adjacent to: Solomon Sea
- Total islands: 1
- Major islands: Panawina
- Area: 30.55 km^{2} (11.80 sq mi)
- Highest elevation: 288 m (945 ft)
- Highest point: Mount Kaluma

Administration
- Papua New Guinea
- Province: Milne Bay
- District: Samarai-Murua District
- LLG: Louisiade Rural LLG
- Island Group: Calvados Chain
- Largest settlement: Bomalou (pop. 300)

Demographics
- Population: 456 (2014)
- Pop. density: 15/km^{2} (39/sq mi)
- Ethnic groups: Papauans, Austronesians, Melanesians.

Additional information
- Time zone: AEST (UTC+10)
- ISO code: PG-MBA
- Official website: www.ncdc.gov.pg

Pana Wina Island is an island of Papua New Guinea. It is part of the Calvados Chain, a grouping of islands within the Louisiade Archipelago. Pana Wina is the largest island in the Calvados Chain, and lies near the eastern end of the chain, just west of Hemenahei Island. The very small Yakimoan Island lies just west of Pana Wina. The capital village of the Calvados Chain, where the ward's school is located, Bomalou, with a population of just over 300, lies on the western shore of the island.
