= Kuwanak Island =

Island in Papua New Guinea

Nickname: Abagagaheia Island
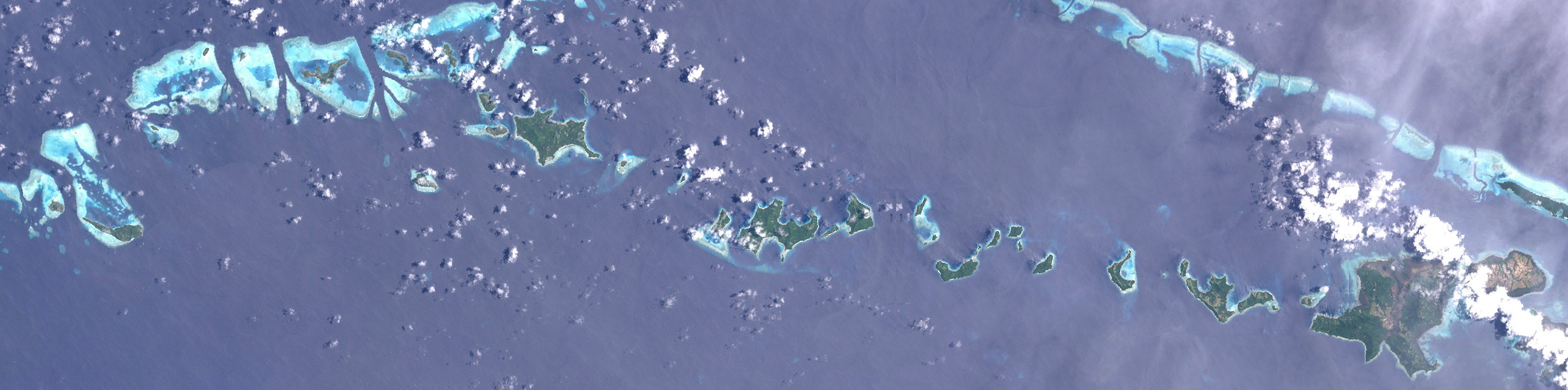
- Satellite image

- Location within Papua New Guinea

Geography
- Location: Oceania
- Coordinates: 11°10′S 152°55′E
- Archipelago: Louisiade Archipelago
- Adjacent to: Solomon Sea
- Total islands: 1
- Major islands: Kuwanak
- Area: 3.66 km^{2} (1.41 sq mi)
- Highest elevation: 182 m (597 ft)
- Highest point: Mount Kuwanak

Administration
- Papua New Guinea
- Province: Milne Bay
- District: Samarai-Murua District
- LLG: Louisiade Rural LLG
- Island Group: Calvados Chain
- Largest settlement: Abagagaheia (pop. 170)

Demographics
- Population: 170 (2014)
- Pop. density: 46/km^{2} (119/sq mi)
- Ethnic groups: Papauans, Austronesians, Melanesians.

Additional information
- Time zone: AEST (UTC+10)
- ISO code: PG-MBA
- Official website: web.archive.org/web/20101223043232/http://oceandots.com/pacific/png/deboyne.php

Kuwanak Island is an island in Papua New Guinea, part of the Calvados Chain within the Louisiade Archipelago. Its only settlement is called Abagagaheia, and it is located on the northwestern point. At low tide you can walk to Taifaur.
