= Jomard Channel =

Coordinates: 11°16′43″S 152°06′02″E

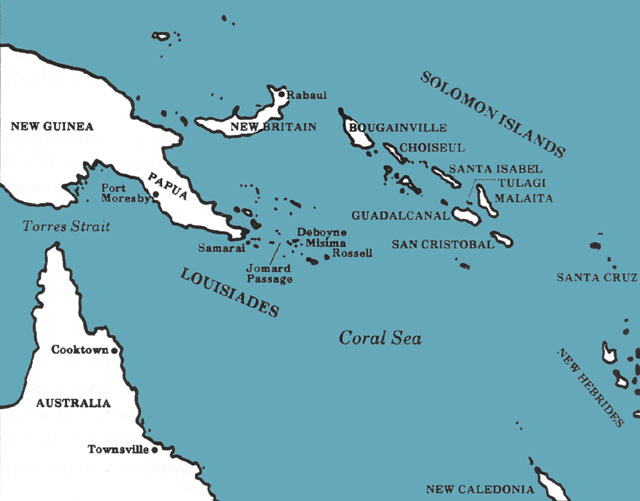
Map of the Papua New Guinea/Solomon Islands area. The Jomard Passage is located just left of center in the map.

The Jomard Channel, also known as the Jomard Entrance or Jomard Passage, is a navigable strait in the Milne Bay Province of Papua New Guinea between the Louisiade Archipelago and New Guinea. The channel lies between the Jomard Islands and Duperré Islets/Bramble Haven and connects the Solomon Sea with the Coral Sea.

== History ==
In 1942 a part of the navy of the Empire of Japan used the Jomard Channel to enter the Coral Sea in order to invade the Papuan capital Port Moresby. The Battle of the Coral Sea preempted the invasion.
