= Calvados Chain =

Group of islands belonging to Papua New Guinea

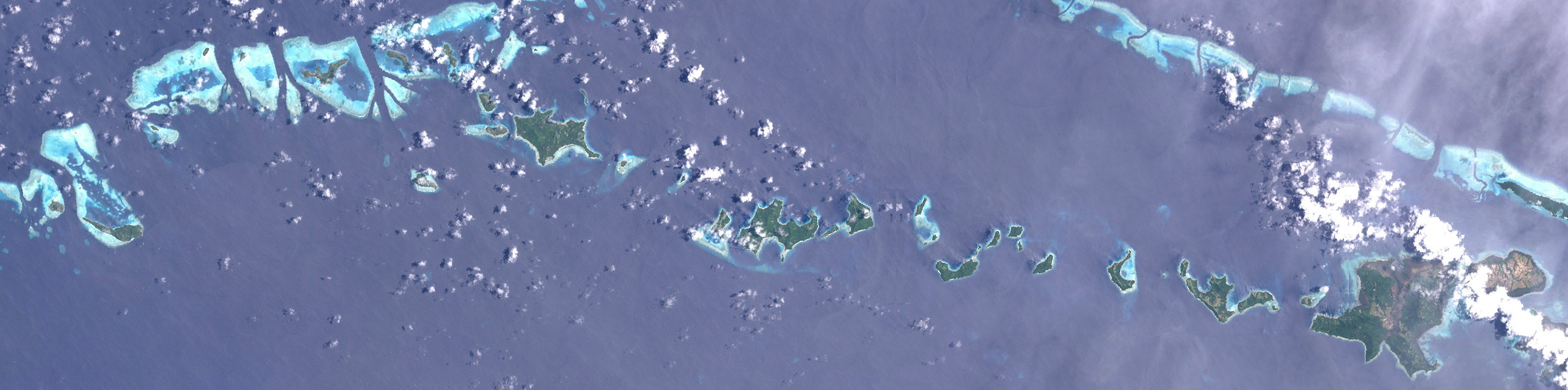
- Satellite image

- Location within Papua New Guinea

Geography
- Location: Oceania
- Coordinates: 11°09′48″S 152°48′32″E
- Archipelago: Louisiade Archipelago
- Adjacent to: Solomon Sea
- Total islands: 45
- Major islands: Pana Wina; Motorina; Bagaman; Hemenahei; Sabari; Utian
- Area: 85.1 km^{2} (32.9 sq mi)

Administration
- Papua New Guinea
- Province: Milne Bay
- District: Samarai-Murua District
- LLG: multiple
- Island Group: Calvados Chain
- Largest settlement: Bomalou (pop. 300)

Demographics
- Population: 3276 (2014)
- Ethnic groups: Papauans, Austronesians, Melanesians.

Additional information
- Time zone: AEST (UTC+10)
- ISO code: PG-MBA
- Official website: www.ncdc.gov.pg

The Calvados Chain are a group of islands in the Solomon Sea, belonging to Papua New Guinea within the Louisiade Archipelago.

== Geography ==
The group extends from Pana Varavara in the west to the small island of Nigaho in the east over a distance of 88 km (55 mi). The easternmost island of Nigaho is where the chain of islands end. Pana Tinani is separated from the group by the isolated Magamaga Channel. The islands rise up to 302 meters (991 ft) (Motorina) steeply from the sea and are either wooded or overgrown with grass. Many islands are surrounded by their own reefs and small lagoons. Apart from the high islands, there are numerous low coral islands and reefs. The eastern edge of the chain lies to the northwest of Vanatinai (formerly Sudest) Island.

== Population ==
Twelve of the islands are inhabited, with a total of 3276 residents as of 2014. The islanders speak the Misima-Paneati Language.

== Islands ==
Primary islands in the chain:

| Island | Capital | Other Cities | Area | | Population 2014 |
| Island | Capital | Other Cities | km^{2} | sq mi | Population 2014 |
|---|---|---|---|---|---|
| Pana Varavara | | | 0.57 | 0.22 | 0 |
| Panasia | | | 2.11 | 0.81 | 0 |
| Sloss Islands | | | 0.36 | 0.14 | 0 |
| Utian | Utian | | 1.54 | 0.59 | 514 |
| Pana Rora | | | 0.81 | 0.31 | 0 |
| Pana Udu Udi | | | 0.69 | 0.27 | 0 |
| Gulewa | Gulewa | | 0.59 | 0.23 | 18 |
| Ululina | Ululina | | 0.59 | 0.23 | 5 |
| Venariwa | Venariwa | | 0.76 | 0.29 | 16 |
| Motorina | Riman Bay | Tawara, Mabaraboraboa | 7.8 | 3.0 | 595 |
| Bonna Wan | | | 1.09 | 0.42 | 0 |
| Bagaman | Bagaman | | 7.45 | 2.88 | 264 |
| Bobo Eina | | | 2.43 | 0.94 | 0 |
| Pana Numara | Hoba Bay | | 1.93 | 0.75 | 183 |
| Yaruman | | | 0.37 | 0.14 | 0 |
| Panangaribu | | | 0.5 | 0.19 | 0 |
| Panatinane | | | 0.79 | 0.31 | 0 |
| Pana Krusima | | | 1.47 | 0.57 | 0 |
| Kuwanak | Kuwanak | | 3.66 | 1.41 | 170 |
| Gigila | Nogui | | 1.42 | 0.55 | 121 |
| Pana Wina | Bomalou | Panambari, Boiama | 30.55 | 11.80 | 456 |
| Hemenahei | | | 10.15 | 3.92 | 0 |
| Nigao | Nigao | | 0.1 | 0.039 | 226 |
| Sabari | Hekampan | Tandeyai, Hebenahine, Maho | 4.04 | 1.56 | 708 |
| Calvados Chain | Pana Wina | Motorina, Bagaman | 85.1 | 32.9 | 3276 |
