= Hemenahei Island =

Island in Papua New Guinea

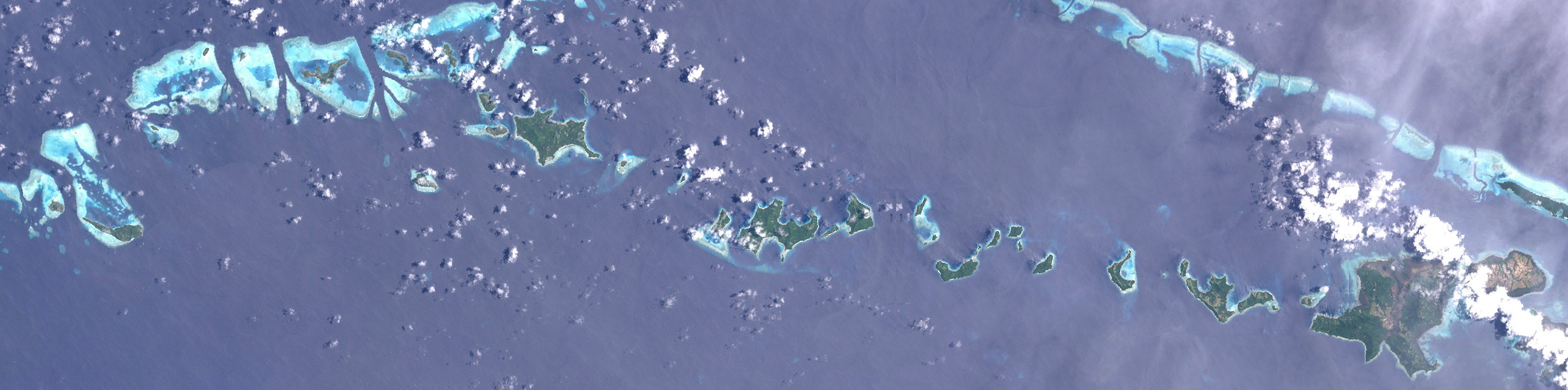
- Satellite image

- Location within Papua New Guinea

Geography
- Location: Oceania
- Coordinates: 11°10′S 153°05′E
- Archipelago: Louisiade Archipelago
- Adjacent to: Solomon Sea
- Total islands: 1
- Major islands: Hemenahei
- Area: 10.24 km^{2} (3.95 sq mi)
- Highest elevation: 74 m (243 ft)
- Highest point: Mount Hemenahei

Administration
- Papua New Guinea
- Province: Milne Bay
- District: Samarai-Murua District
- LLG: Yeleamba Rural LLG
- Island Group: Calvados Chain
- Largest settlement: Niyalehoi

Demographics
- Population: 0 (2014)
- Pop. density: 0/km^{2} (0/sq mi)
- Ethnic groups: Papauans, Austronesians, Melanesians.

Additional information
- Time zone: AEST (UTC+10)
- ISO code: PG-MBA
- Official website: www.ncdc.gov.pg

Hemenahei Island is an island in Papua New Guinea, part of the Calvados Chain within the Louisiade Archipelago. It is located to toward the eastern end of the Calvados Chain, in the Louisiade Archipelago, in the Milne Bay Province, between Pana Tinani (off Vanatinai) in the East and Pana Wina in the West.

The area of the island is 10.24 square kilometres (3.95 square miles). It was previously inhabited (Niyalehoi village on the northern coast) but now only occasionally being used as a camp for fishermen who come from Pana Tinani. Niyalehoi had some gardens for yams and sago, that Sabari Islanders used to crop.
