= Jomard Islands =

Island group in Papua New Guinea

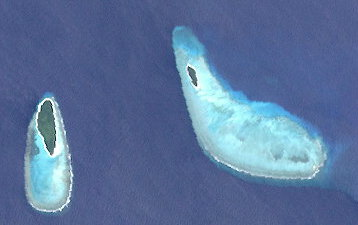
- Pana Waipona (left) and Panarairai (right)

- Location within Papua New Guinea

Geography
- Location: Oceania
- Coordinates: 11°15′48″S 152°10′32″E
- Archipelago: Louisiade Archipelago
- Adjacent to: Solomon Sea
- Total islands: 2 uninhabited
- Major islands: Pana Waipona; Panarairai
- Area: 0.96 km^{2} (0.37 sq mi)

Administration
- Papua New Guinea
- Province: Milne Bay
- District: Samarai-Murua District
- LLG: Louisiade Rural Local Level Government Area
- Island Group: Duchateau Islands
- Largest island: Pana Waipona

Demographics
- Population: 0 (2014)
- Pop. density: 0/km^{2} (0/sq mi)
- Ethnic groups: Papauans, Austronesians, Melanesians.

Additional information
- Time zone: AEST (UTC+10)
- ISO code: PG-MBA
- Official website: www.ncdc.gov.pg

The Jomard Islands are an uninhabited island group in the Coral Sea, belonging to Papua New Guinea, It lies to the east of Montemont Islands in the Louisiade Archipelago.

== Administrative ==
Administratively they belong to the province of Milne Bay in the southeastern part of Papua New Guinea. They are controlled by the chief of Utian Island, the nearest inhabited island.

== History ==
The Jomard Islands are situated within a passage which was used by the Empire of Japan to invade the Coral Sea in order to capture Port Moresby during World War II. In 2016, the islands were designated as a Particularly Sensitive Sea Area.

== Geography ==
The Jomard Islands are located on the south side of Jomard Passage, a 9 km (5.6 mi) wide passage between the Atoll Bramble Haven in the west and the western edge of the barrier reef of Vanatinai to the east. The largest of the islands, Pana Waipona (79 ha; 200 acres), located on a small reef in the middle of Jomard passage. It is used as a garden for Laeloga family of Utian. The smaller island Panarairai (17 ha; 42 acres) located 3.5 km (2.2 mi) east on a larger reef on the eastern edge of Jomard Passage. Both islands are low-lying, forested and are situated on the northern edges of their flat, lagoon. They are located 3 km (1.9 mi) north west of the Montemont Islands. The Jomard Islands are in the category "Mixed objects" that combines both criteria of the cultural and natural heritage. Together with the Conflict Group, Bramble Haven, Samarai and Lunn Island, they form the Milne Bay Seascape (Pacific Jewels of Marine Biodiversity) and the government of Papua New Guinea applied to add this seapark to the list of UNESCO world heritage sites.
