= East Island =

East Island can refer to the following islands:

== Americas ==
- East Island (Hawaii), an island of Hawaii washed away by a storm surge
- East Island (Long Island Sound) in the U.S. state of New York
- East Island (Oregon)
- East Island, Rhode Island
- East Falkland

== Oceania ==
- East Island (Ashmore and Cartier Islands)
- East Island (Lacepede Islands), Western Australia
- East Island (Mary Anne Group), Western Australia
- East Island, Hawaii, an island washed away by a storm surge
- East Island/Whangaokeno, New Zealand
- East Island, Papua New Guinea
- East Island (South Australia)
- East Island (Tasmania)

== Elsewhere ==
- East Island (Andaman and Nicobar Islands)

== See also ==
- Île de l'Est, Crozet Archipelago, Indian Ocean
- Eastern Island (disambiguation)
- Easter Island
