= Strathord Islands =

Island group in Papua New Guinea

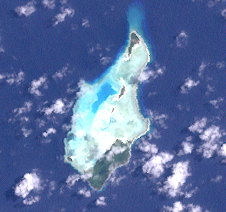
- (From top to bottom) North Island, Middle Island, Amanuta and Strathord Island

- Location within Papua New Guinea

Geography
- Location: Oceania
- Coordinates: 10°14′33″S 151°51′39″E
- Archipelago: Louisiade Archipelago
- Adjacent to: Solomon Sea
- Total islands: 5
- Major islands: Strathord Island
- Area: 1.35 km^{2} (0.52 sq mi)
- Highest elevation: 20 m (70 ft)
- Highest point: Mount Panomole

Administration
- Papua New Guinea
- Province: Milne Bay
- District: Samarai-Murua District
- LLG: Louisiade Rural Local Level Government Area
- Island Group: Bonvouloir Islands
- Largest island: Strathord Island

Demographics
- Population: 0 (2014)
- Ethnic groups: Papauans, Austronesians, Melanesians.

Additional information
- Time zone: AEST (UTC+10)
- ISO code: PG-MBA
- Official website: www.ncdc.gov.pg

The Strathord Islands are an uninhabited island group of five islands in the Louisiade Archipelago of Papua New Guinea. Politically they belong to the province of Milne Bay in the southeastern region of Papua New Guinea .

The islands are located about 100 km (62 mi) northwest of Misima and form the northernmost group of Louisiade archipelago. They are among the Bonvouloir Islands which include two other islands to the south.

The main island—Strathord Island, also known as Panamole—lies on the southern part of the reef. The group is heavily forested and flat. Strathord was inhabited by two families from Ewena until 2013. Nowadays, they come a couple of times a year to collect yams and coconuts from their gardens.

Name	Coordinates	Area km^{2}	Area sq mi
North Island		0.18	0.069
Middle Island		0.08	0.031
Amanuta		0.05	0.019
(unnamed)		0.04	0.015
Strathord Island (Panamole)		0.99	0.38
