= Bagaman Island =

Island in Papua New Guinea

Nickname: Stanton Island
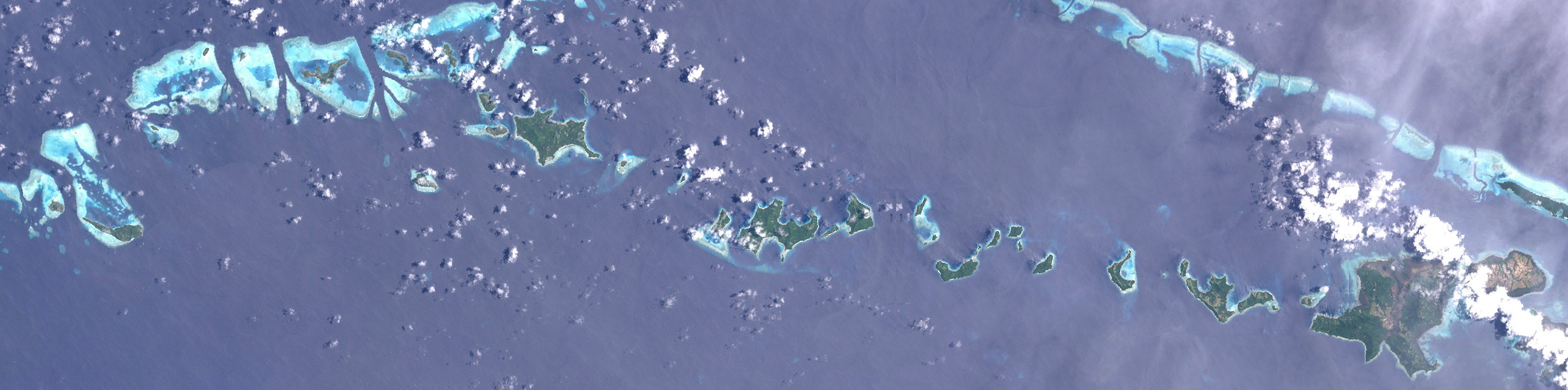
- Satellite image

- Location within Papua New Guinea

Geography
- Location: Oceania
- Coordinates: 11°08′S 152°41′E
- Archipelago: Louisiade Archipelago
- Adjacent to: Solomon Sea
- Total islands: 1
- Major islands: Bagaman
- Area: 7.45 km^{2} (2.88 sq mi)
- Highest elevation: 220 m (720 ft)
- Highest point: Mount Bagaman

Administration
- Papua New Guinea
- Province: Milne Bay
- District: Samarai-Murua District
- LLG: Louisiade Rural LLG
- Island Group: Calvados Chain
- Largest settlement: Bagaman (pop. 100)

Demographics
- Population: 264 (2014)
- Ethnic groups: Papauans, Austronesians, Melanesians.

Additional information
- Time zone: AEST (UTC+10)
- ISO code: PG-MBA
- Official website: www.ncdc.gov.pg

Bagaman Island is an island of Papua New Guinea, part of the Calvados Chain within the Louisiade Archipelago. Misima language is the native language on the island.
