= Motorina Island =

Island of Papua New Guinea

Nickname: Mewstone Island
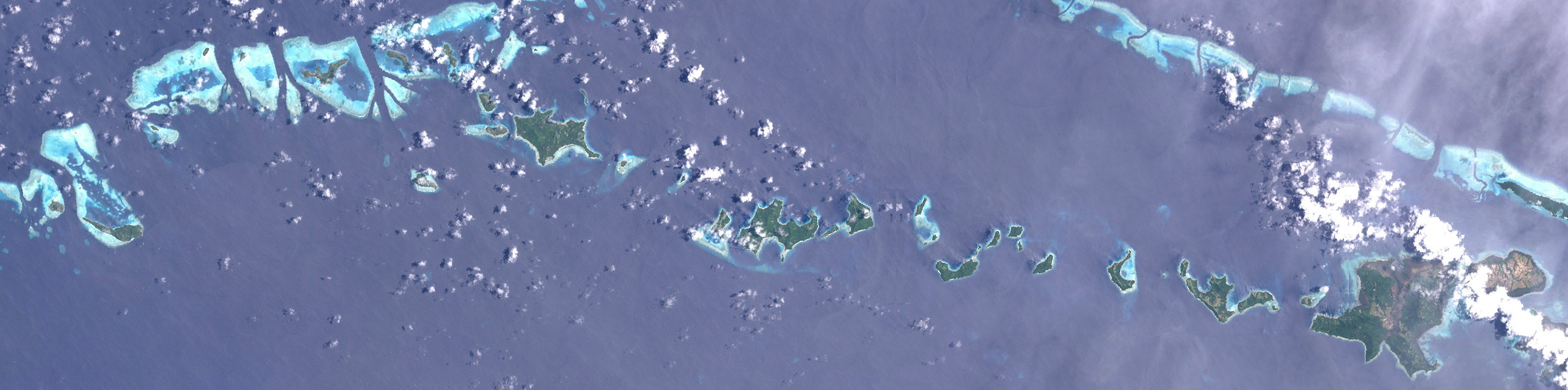
- Satellite image

- Location within Papua New Guinea

Geography
- Location: Oceania
- Coordinates: 11°05′S 152°34′E
- Archipelago: Louisiade Archipelago
- Adjacent to: Solomon Sea
- Total islands: 1
- Major islands: Motorina
- Area: 7.8 km^{2} (3.0 sq mi)
- Highest elevation: 302 m (991 ft)
- Highest point: Mount Motorina

Administration
- Papua New Guinea
- Province: Milne Bay
- District: Samarai-Murua District
- LLG: Louisiade Rural LLG
- Island Group: Calvados Chain
- Largest settlement: Riman Bay (pop. 100)

Demographics
- Population: 595 (2014)
- Pop. density: 76/km^{2} (197/sq mi)
- Ethnic groups: Papauans, Austronesians, Melanesians.

Additional information
- Time zone: AEST (UTC+10)
- ISO code: PG-MBA
- Official website: www.ncdc.gov.pg

Motorina Island is an island of Papua New Guinea, part of the Calvados Chain. It is the highest island in the group. The population consists of farmers, raising bananas across the island. The main port is at Riman Bay. Other slightly large villages include: Tawara, Mabaraboraboa.
