= TYTO Regional Art Gallery =

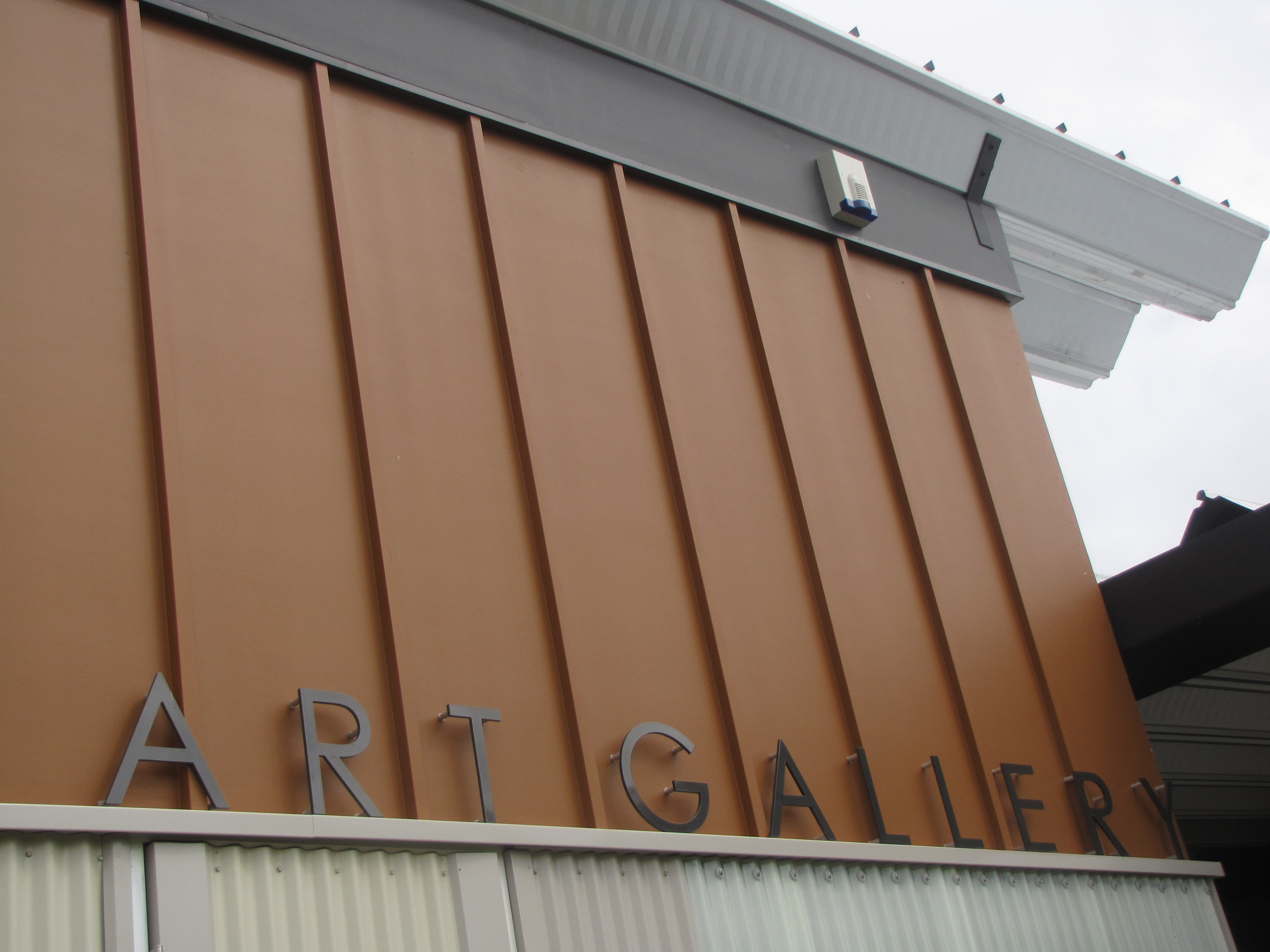
- Former name: Gallery Hinchinbrook
- Established: 2011
- Location: 73-75 McIlwraith Street, Ingham, Queensland, Australia
- Coordinates: 18.65245°S 146.15234°E
- Type: Art gallery
- Website: www.tyto.com.au/gallery

TYTO Regional Art Gallery is a regional art gallery in Ingham, Queensland, within the Hinchinbrook Shire. It is located in the TYTO Wetlands (named after the local Eastern Grass Owl, Tyto capensis). It is a public gallery operated by Hinchinbrook Shire Council that hosts continuous local and traveling exhibitions. The gallery also has a shop that sells art by, primarily, North Queensland artists.

== History ==
The previous gallery opened in June 1999. Known as the Gallery Hinchinbrook, it was situated in the TAFE / Hinchinbrook Shire Library complex on Townsville Road, Ingham, which was also opened in 1999. The gallery was owned by the Barrier Reef Institute of TAFE and was leased and administered by council, in conjunction with the Friends of Gallery Hinchinbrook Association Inc., a voluntary association.

The Queensland Government committed $4 million out of a planned $8 million for Stage 2 of the "Our Town our Future - Ingham Cultural Complex," known as the Tyto Precinct. The gallery is part of this precinct. Funding was subsequently delayed, but work on the precinct began in 2010.

In March 2011, a new purpose-built gallery was opened in the TYTO Wetlands Precinct and is formally known as the TYTO Regional Art Gallery with the main gallery named after John Coburn, an artist born in Ingham.

In May 2024, a 2.4-metre (7 ft 10 in) crocodile was removed from the wetlands. in May 2025, a 3.4-metre (11 ft) estuarine crocodile was removed from the wetlands.
