= Nigaho Island =

Island in Papua New Guinea

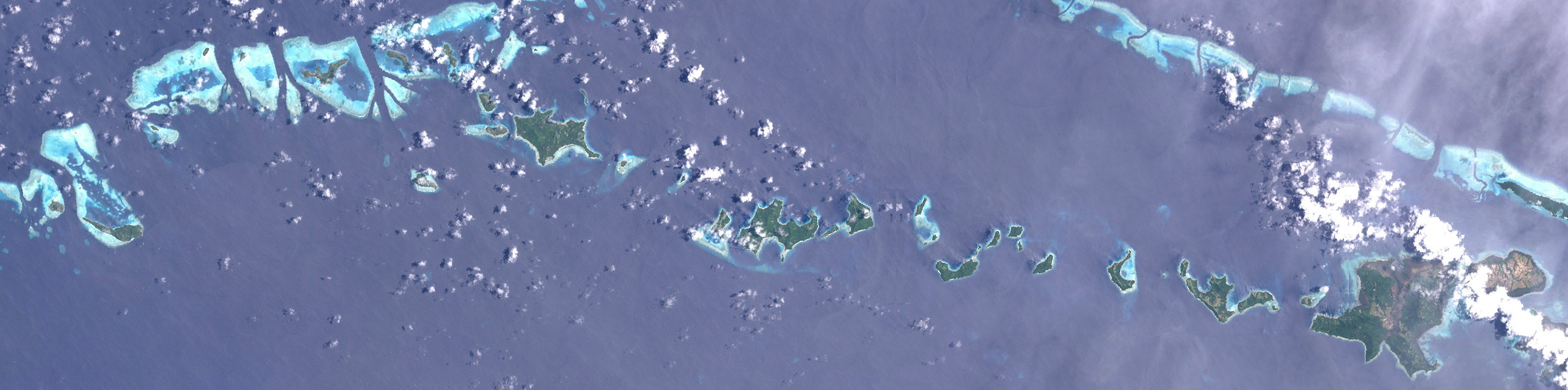
- Satellite image

- Location within Papua New Guinea

Geography
- Location: Oceania
- Coordinates: 11°11′S 153°05′E
- Archipelago: Louisiade Archipelago
- Adjacent to: Solomon Sea
- Total islands: 1
- Major islands: Nigaho
- Area: 0.11 km^{2} (0.042 sq mi)
- Highest elevation: 20 m (70 ft)

Administration
- Papua New Guinea
- Province: Milne Bay
- District: Samarai-Murua District
- LLG: Yeleamba Rural LLG
- Island Group: Calvados Chain
- Largest settlement: Nigaho (pop. 226)

Demographics
- Population: 226 (2014)
- Pop. density: 2,054/km^{2} (5320/sq mi)
- Ethnic groups: Papauans, Austronesians, Melanesians.

Additional information
- Time zone: AEST (UTC+10)
- ISO code: PG-MBA
- Official website: www.ncdc.gov.pg

Nigaho Island is an island in Papua New Guinea, part of the Calvados Chain within the Louisiade Archipelago. Politically, it is in Pana Tinani Ward, not like the other Calvados Chain islands which all belong to the Calvados Chain Ward. It is the most densely populated island of the chain. It is the most eastern island of the chain.
