= Nicholas Euclid =

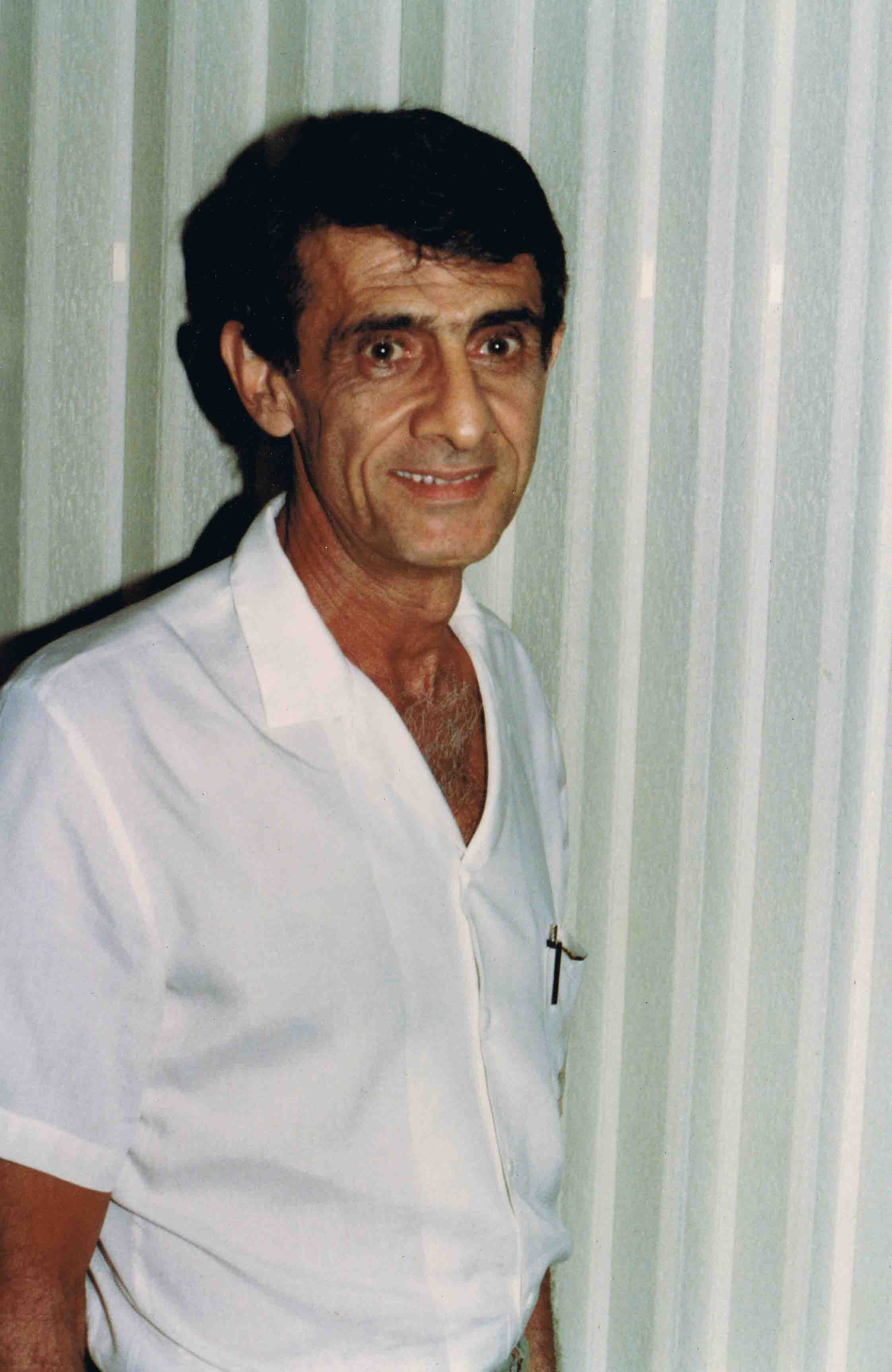

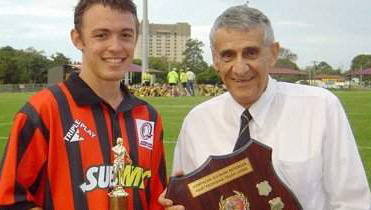
c. 2005

Nicholas "Nick" Euclid OAM (15 March 1932 – 27 September 2007) was Chairman of Queensland Rugby League Referees' Association and founding Chairman of the Australian Rugby League Referees' Association. He was a rugby team manager and a drummer.

== Family life ==
Fondly known as 'The Greek', Euclid was born in Ingham, Queensland. His parents were post-World War II immigrants from Kastellorizo, Greece. After schooling in Ingham, he attended All Souls College, Charters Towers, Queensland. He was an active musician (drummer) and met his future wife, Maureen Crowley, while playing at a local dance in Townsville. They eventually married and had three children; Pauline, Jim and Tina. Together with his wife, Euclid was proprietor of the White Rose Cafe (Ingham, Queensland) and Nick's Fine Foods (Townsville) before managing the Townsville Rugby League Club (Pimlico) until his retirement in 1996. Following his retirement, he continued in his full-time position as Director of the Australian Rugby League Referees' Association until his death in September 2007.

== Sporting career ==
From a young age, Euclid was active in local Rugby league, playing for the local Herbert River team in the annual Foley Shield matches. After retiring from the game, Euclid went on to referee in two international matches and was considered the leading referee in the region for a substantial period. a professional rugby league footballer in his youth, he also tried his hand at coaching, guiding the likes of fellow Ingham-born Laurie Spina and Australian Test representative Greg Dowling. Dowling credited Euclid as being instrumental in diverting him from a life of trouble to that of a dedicated athlete.

A hugely popular member of the QRL office, Euclid was a father figure to many of the State's great rugby league referees, including Referees' Academy Manager Eddie Ward and Barry 'Grasshopper' Gomersall. Euclid famously handed his first-ever whistle after being injured during a Foley Shield match in Townsville. Gomersall, who had been touch judge on the day, kept the whistle as a lucky charm until his death in February 2008.

Euclid was for many years charged with nominating and appointing Queensland-based referees to State of Origin fixtures and also to the Queensland Wizard Cup and State League competitions. In many of the years that Euclid occupied his Board positions with the ARL and QRL Referees, he did so in an honorary capacity, not receiving remuneration. In June 2002, Euclid was awarded a Medal of the Order of Australia 'for service to Rugby League football as a player, coach, administrator and referee, particularly in the development of referee accreditation policy.'

The Nick Euclid Medal is given annually in his honor to the Best Young Rugby League Referee in Australia.
