= Eastern Island =

Eastern Island may refer to:

- An islet in Midway Atoll, US Minor Outlying Islands
- An islet in Palmyra Atoll, US Minor Outlying Islands

== See also ==
- Easter Island, the Chilean island in the Pacific Ocean
- East Island (disambiguation)
