= Hastings Island (Papua New Guinea) =

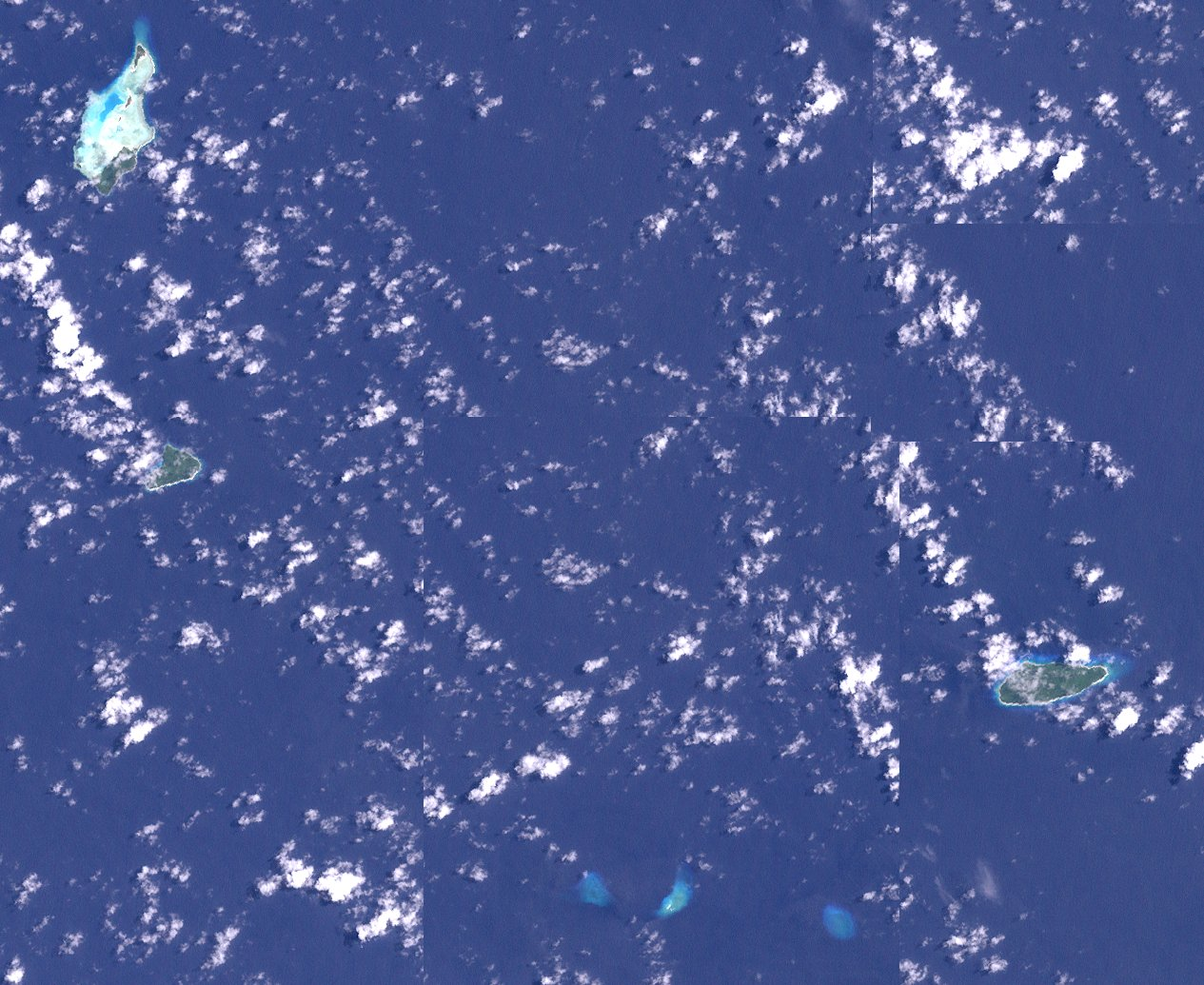
- Hastings is in the center left section

- Location within Papua New Guinea

Geography
- Location: Oceania
- Coordinates: 10°20′10″S 151°52′35″E
- Archipelago: Louisiade Archipelago
- Adjacent to: Solomon Sea
- Total islands: 1
- Major islands: Hastings
- Area: 1.26 km^{2} (0.49 sq mi)
- Highest elevation: 300 m (1000 ft)
- Highest point: Mount Hastings

Administration
- Papua New Guinea
- Province: Milne Bay
- District: Samarai-Murua District
- LLG: Louisiade Rural Local Level Government Area
- Island Group: Bonvouloir Islands
- Largest island: Hastings

Demographics
- Population: 0 (2014)
- Ethnic groups: Papauans, Austronesians, Melanesians.

Additional information
- Time zone: AEST (UTC+10)
- ISO code: PG-MBA
- Official website: www.ncdc.gov.pg

Hastings Island is one of the Bonvouloir Islands in the Louisiade Archipelago. Administratively, it is located in Milne Bay Province of Papua New Guinea.
