= Hinchinbrook Shire Library =

Coordinates: 18.6518°S 146.1540°E

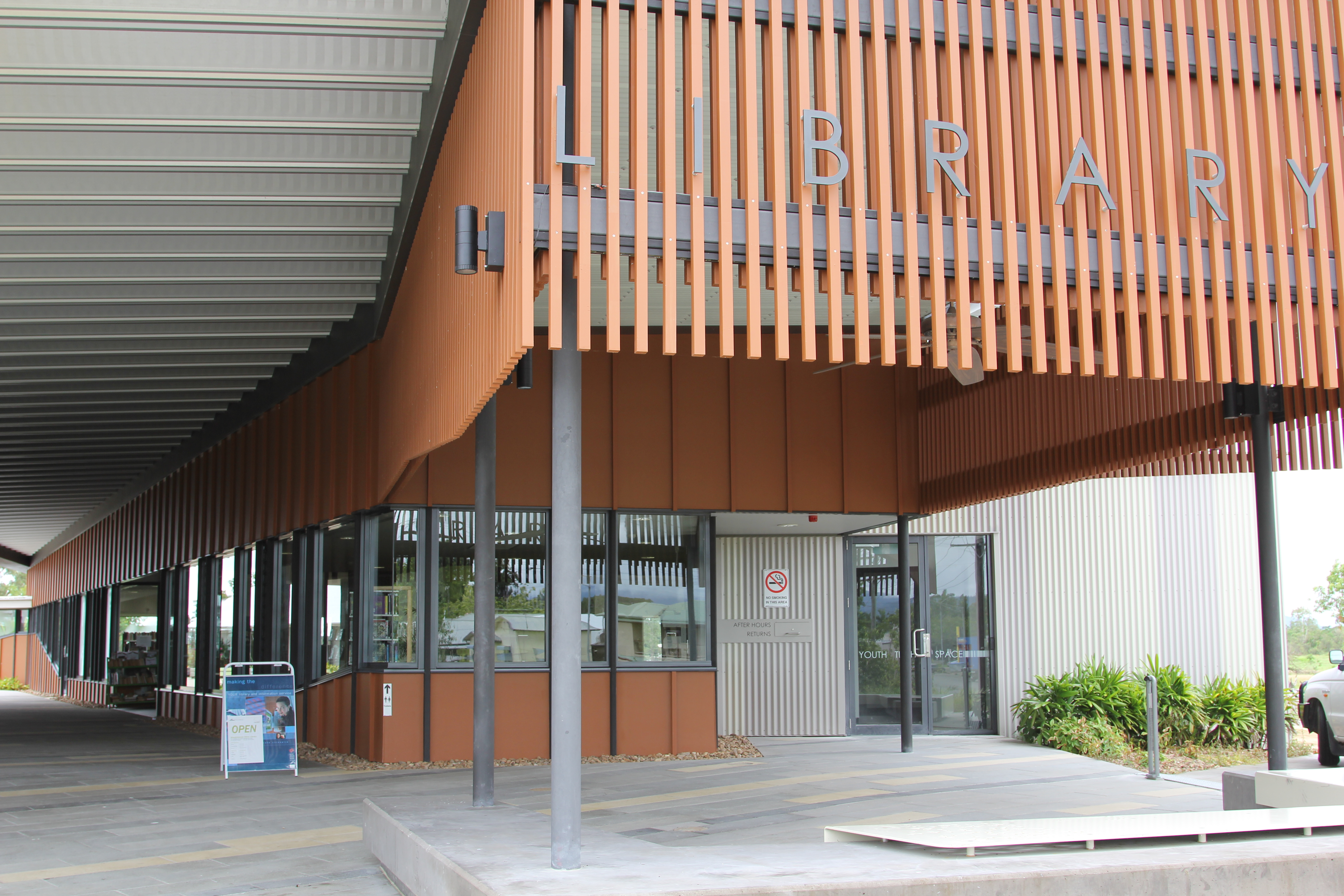
Hinchinbrook Shire Library

Hinchinbrook Shire Library is a public library servicing the Hinchinbrook Shire, Queensland, Australia. It is located at 73–75 McIllwraith Street in the town of Ingham.

== History ==
The current Hinchinbrook Shire Library opened in 2011 in Ingham.
