= Ingham Court House =

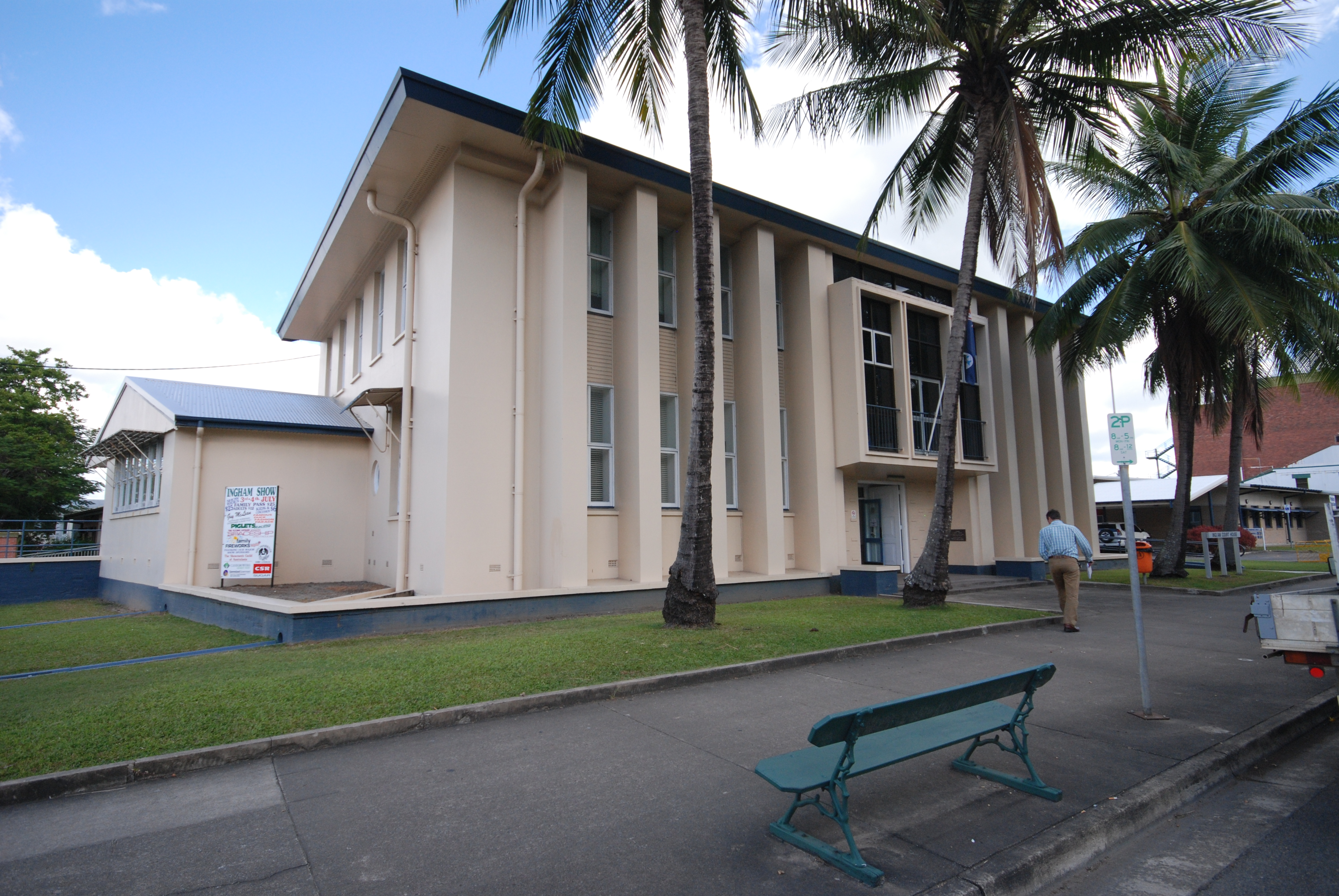
- Ingham Court House, 2009

- Location within Queensland Location within Australia
- 18.6512°S 146.1562°E
- Location: 35–39 Palm Terrace, Ingham, Shire of Hinchinbrook, Queensland, Australia

History
- Design period: 1940s–1960s (post-World War II)
- Built: 1948

Site notes
- Architect: John Hitch of the Department of Public Works (Queensland)
- Architectural style: Modernism

Queensland Heritage Register
- Official name: Ingham Court House
- Type: state heritage (built)
- Designated: 28 April 2000
- Reference no.: 601546
- Significant period: 1940s (historical); 1948–1950s (fabric)
- Significant components: court house

Ingham Court House is a heritage-listed courthouse at 35–39 Palm Terrace, Ingham, Shire of Hinchinbrook, Queensland, Australia. It was designed by John Hitch of the Department of Public Works (Queensland) and built in 1948. It was added to the Queensland Heritage Register on 28 April 2000.

== History ==
The Ingham Court House was designed in 1948 by John Hitch of the Queensland Department of Works. The building replaced an earlier court house on part of the site which was retained for other purposes.

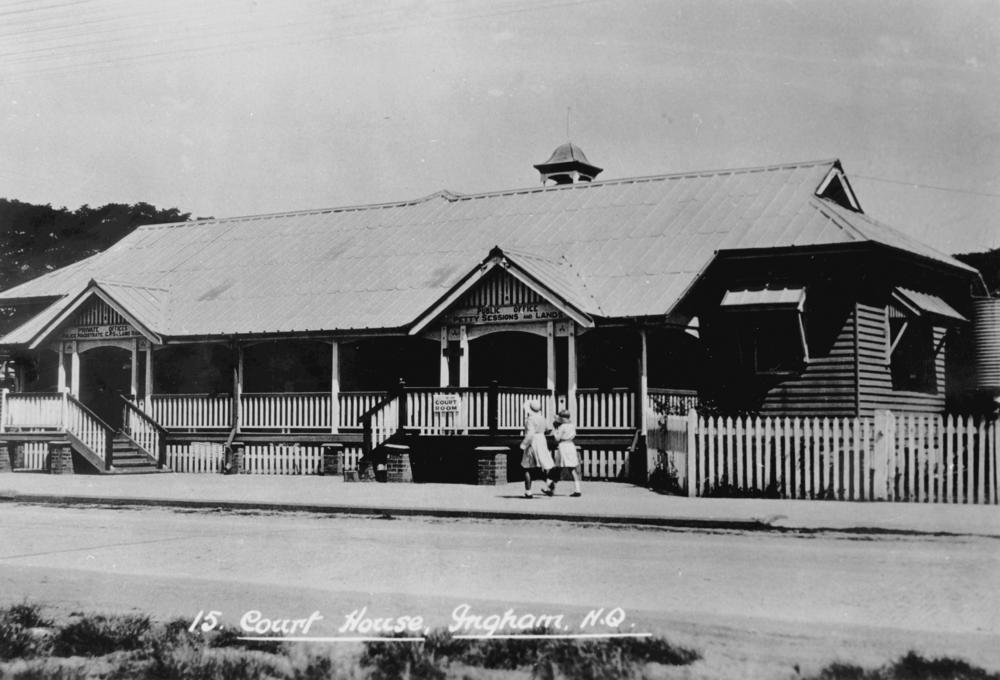
Earlier Court House, Ingham, circa 1933

The earlier court house was constructed in 1915 and was a single-storeyed timber building. Following construction of the 1948 Court House, the 1915 building was taken over by the Police Department and altered. The 1948 building was located on the corner of Park Terrace to the north and Davidson Street to the east. It was deliberately designed to establish a more impressive civic streetscape and to signify a self-conscious post war progressivism and expansion. Designed in 1948, its completion took about five years owing to post war shortages of building materials, particularly bricks.

John Hitch qualified as an architect in England in 1938 and served as a Flight Lieutenant in the RAF during World War II. His early work was influenced by Scandinavian and other prewar streams of modernism. He later won a design competition for government buildings in Reykjavik, where he had served during the war. The buildings were later featured on a series of Icelandic postage stamps.

On demobilisation, Hitch worked as a specialist valuer in compensation claims for UK buildings requisitioned during the war years. In 1947 he was one of about six UK architects recruited for the Queensland Department of Public Works and fulfilled a three-year contract in Queensland until 1951. By then he was apparently the last of the group remaining in Queensland; some of the others having broken their contracts and returned to the UK. Hitch entered private practice for some years with Theo Thynne. For most of his time in Brisbane he combined a diverse architectural practice with part-time teaching of Design to senior years in the University of Queensland Bachelor of Architecture course. In 1962 he left the Brisbane practice, at that time being the partnership of Hitch and Sinnamon, and joined Bates, Smart and McCuthcheon in Melbourne where he remained until retirement.

John Hitch's time with the Queensland Government, then considered something of a backwater, produced a number of significant and innovative designs. The Department's excessive division of labour and particularly the exclusion of design architects from site visits even in the initial design stage were unwelcome impediments, which Hitch contested with occasional success. The Ingham Court House was his first design project for the Department and he contrived a site visit there, during a near cyclone. His resulting design attempted to incorporate innovative climatic design with "a "contemporary" design acceptable within the departmental and ministerial understanding" and successfully achieved what he called "newly established post-war imagery of a public building".

The Ingham Court House was designed and constructed as a two storeyed brick and reinforced concrete structure with an impressive entrance and stair hall to the first floor court rooms. Sun control was effected within the building by recessed wall surfaces broken by piers and horizontal metal sun hood spaced to promote convectional air flow. Mechanical ventilation equipment was installed within the roof space under a curved ridge line. This innovative roof profile, which was apparently a casualty of an on-site design change, was a response to cyclonic wind speeds, and anchored down to reinforced concrete perimeter beams.

== Description ==
The Ingham Court House is a two storeyed rendered brick and reinforced concrete structure with a generally symmetrical facade to Palm Terrace and a less formal asymmetrical grouping to Davidson Street. The fibro-cement sheeted roof has a characteristic ventilated hipped gable arrangement with strongly expressed eaves, in form and pitch reflecting that of the neighbouring earlier court house, which however is no longer clearly visible. The main ridge as built is a departure from the architect's intention as seen in the working drawings, which show a curved ridge of a type which became popular some decades later.

The north (Palm Terrace) elevation is rhythmically articulated with brick piers, protecting vertical windows and the outer walls of the upstairs Juvenile Court and witness rooms and downstairs offices.

A central entry at ground floor level leads up to a ground floor public space and an elegant bifurcating staircase, whose intermediate landing forms a projecting foyer space protecting the entry below, and is expressed with a generous glass wall overlooking the street. Smaller upper windows on the western elevation are protected by overhanging eaves and those on the ground floor have light horizontal window hoods, those rooms being mainly toilets and ancillary services. A similar projection occurs on the eastern elevation where windows are larger and to a projecting single storeyed wing housing secondary offices, with a separate podium entry from the street. The south elevation continues the pattern of large vertical windows to the upper floor, serving the Court Room and the general office on the ground floor.

The corner site includes lawns and large trees to the rear of the building, with a row of vigorously growing palms partly obscuring the front facade.

Generally the interiors are intact and impressive, particularly in view of the inadequate system of construction supervision customary at the time. The interior generally has timber framed floors, rendered brick wall, painted panels and lightly detailed timber. The influence of Scandinavian modernism may be seen in the understated blond timber finishes and joinery, and the lightness and precision of the planar composition of court room fittings. The main staircase is light and airy, with grey terrazzo treads and risers and an almost freestanding handrail tracing a playful line within the generous volume containing the stairs. The stairwell creates a remarkable focus in a finely contrived sequence of spaces.

== Heritage listing ==
Ingham Court House was listed on the Queensland Heritage Register on 28 April 2000 having satisfied the following criteria.

The place is important in demonstrating the evolution or pattern of Queensland's history.

The place is important because of its aesthetic significance.

The place is important in demonstrating a high degree of creative or technical achievement at a particular period.

The Ingham Court House represents an early expression of a Government intention to develop a progressive and sophisticated image through its postwar building program. The building was designed by John Hitch, one of the young English architects recruited by the Department of Works in 1947. The Ingham Court House can be seen as one in a sequence of provincial court house buildings including Tully Court House (1945) and Bundaberg Court House (1956) and also designed by Hitch, by then in private practice. The place is significant for its place in this history of public architecture and government policy and as an important stage in the work of its architect, as well as for its aesthetic qualities of architecture and its technical innovations particularly in climatic control in the tropics.
