= East Island, Papua New Guinea =

Island in Papua New Guinea

East Island
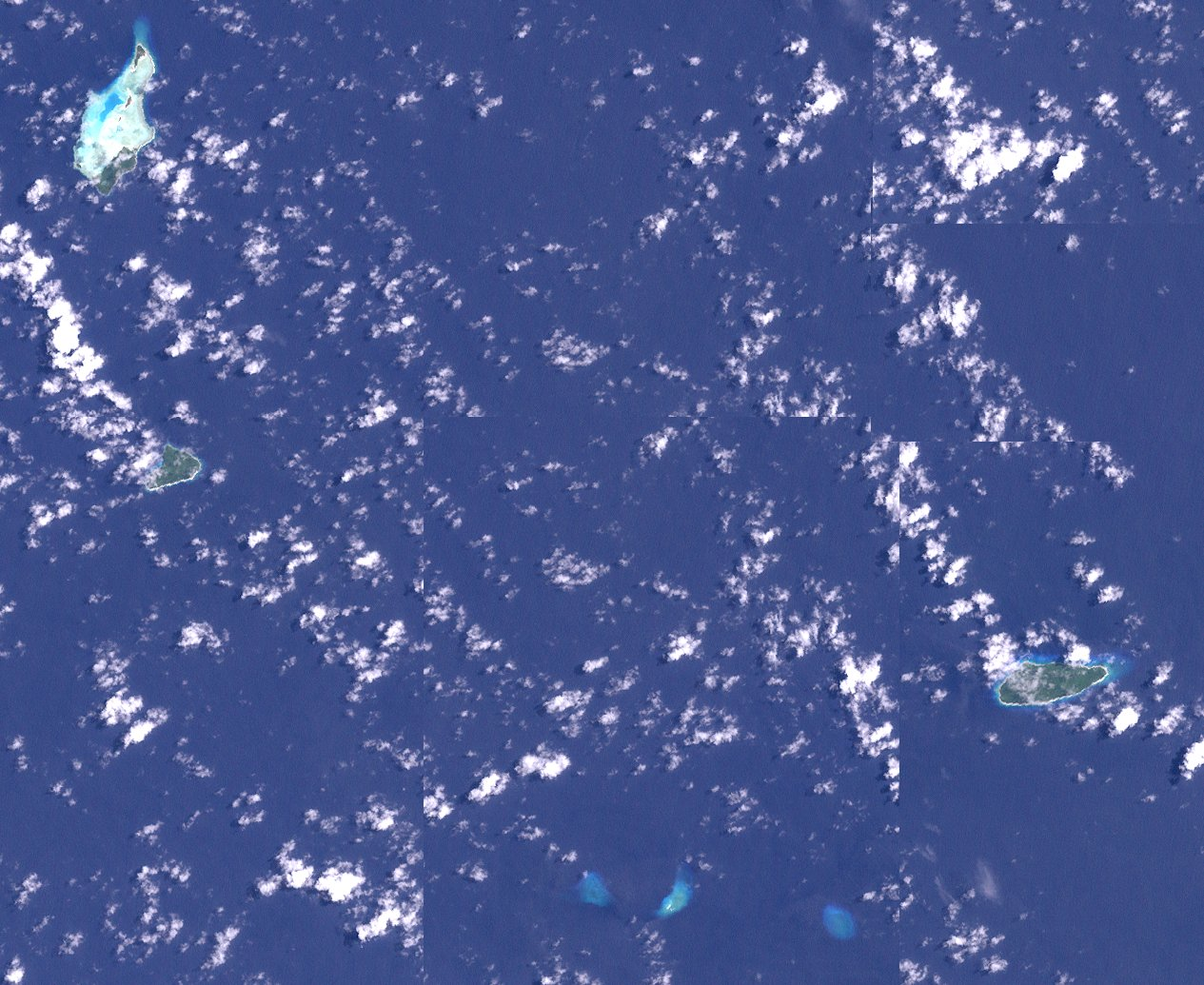
- East Island is in the lower right section

- Location within Papua New Guinea

Geography
- Location: Oceania
- Coordinates: 10°23′42″S 152°06′14″E
- Archipelago: Louisiade Archipelago
- Adjacent to: Solomon Sea
- Total islands: 1
- Major islands: East
- Area: 2.93 km^{2} (1.13 sq mi)
- Highest elevation: 200 m (700 ft)
- Highest point: Mount East

Administration
- Papua New Guinea
- Province: Milne Bay
- District: Samarai-Murua District
- LLG: Louisiade Rural Local Level Government Area
- Island Group: Bonvouloir Islands
- Largest island: East

Demographics
- Population: 0 (2014)
- Ethnic groups: Papauans, Austronesians, Melanesians.

Additional information
- Time zone: AEST (UTC+10)
- ISO code: PG-MBA
- Official website: web.archive.org/web/20101223043232/http://oceandots.com/pacific/png/deboyne.php

East Island is an island in Milne Bay Province of southeastern Papua New Guinea.

It is in the Bonvouloir Islands archipelago group of the Louisiade Archipelago.
