= Ingham, Queensland =

Ingham
- Town
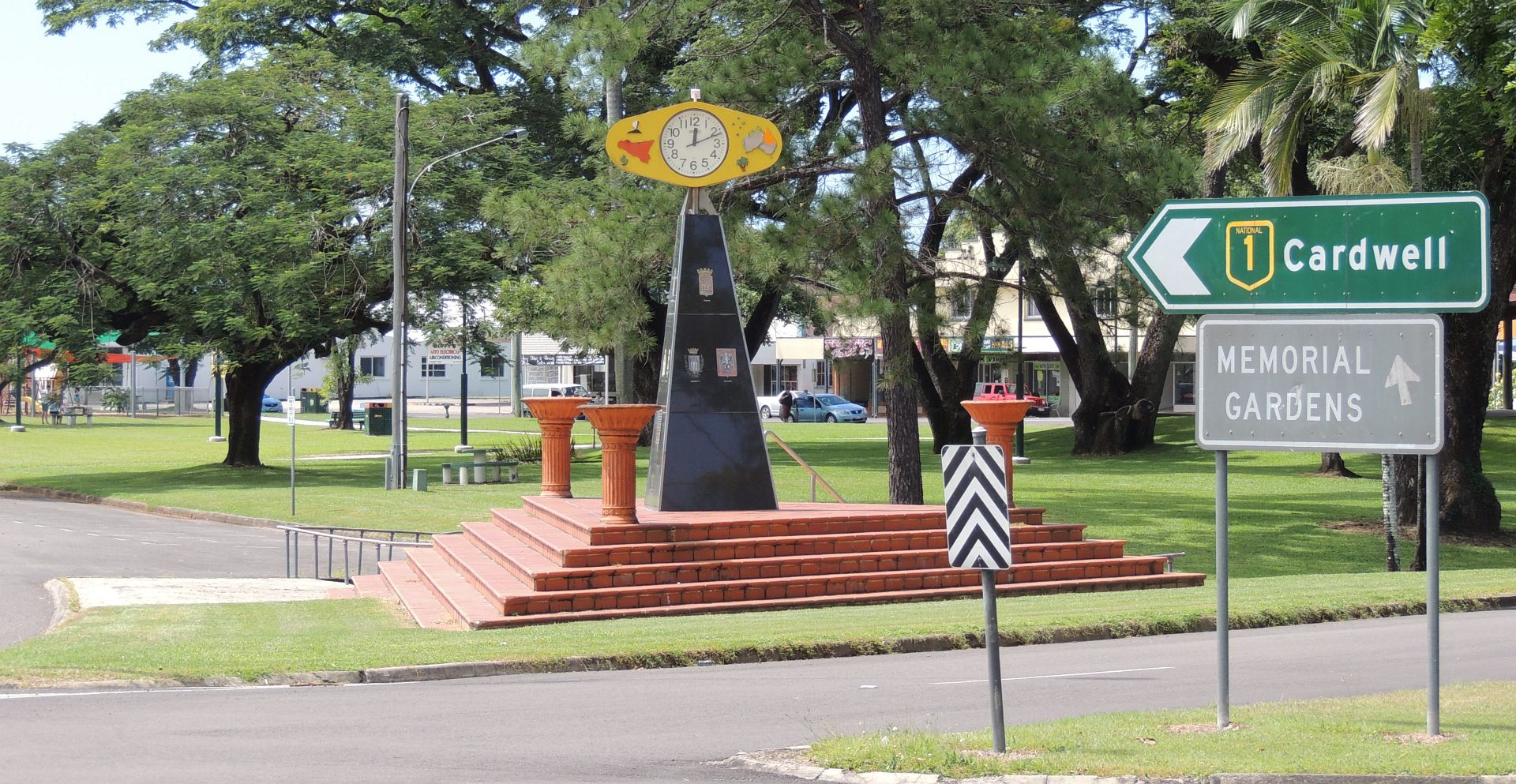
- Clock at Rotary park

- Interactive map of Ingham
- Coordinates: 18.6508°S 146.1572°E
- Country: Australia
- State: Queensland
- LGA: Shire of Hinchinbrook
- Location: 112 km (70 mi) NW of Townsville; 235 km (146 mi) S of Cairns; 1,443 km (897 mi) NNW of Brisbane
- Established: 1864

Government
  - State electorate: Hinchinbrook
  - Federal division: Kennedy

Area
  - Total: 40.6 km^{2} (15.7 sq mi)
- Elevation: 11.8 m (39 ft)

Population
  - Total: 4,455 (2021 census)
  - Density: 109.73/km^{2} (284.2/sq mi)
- Time zone: UTC+10:00 (AEST)
- Postcode: 4850
- County: Cardwell
- Mean max temp: 29.1 °C (84.4 °F)
- Mean min temp: 18.8 °C (65.8 °F)
- Annual rainfall: 2,046.5 mm (80.57 in)
Localities around Ingham
Hawkins Creek	Hawkins Creek	Gairloch; Foresthome
Trebonne	Ingham	Victoria Plantation
Trebonne	Toobanna	Blackrock

Ingham is a rural town and locality in the Shire of Hinchinbrook, Queensland, Australia. It is named after William Bairstow Ingham and is the administrative centre for the Shire of Hinchinbrook.

In the 2021 census, the locality of Ingham had a population of 4,455 people.

== Geography ==
Ingham is approximately 110 kilometres (68 mi) north of Townsville and 1,437 kilometres (893 mi) north of the state capital, Brisbane. The town is positioned about 17 kilometres (11 mi) inland within the Herbert River floodplain where Palm Creek drains the low-lying lands. It is surrounded by sugar cane farms which are serviced by a number of private railways.

The North Coast railway line passes through the town, which is served by the Ingham railway station. The Bruce Highway also passes through the town.

Tokalon is a neighbourhood in the south-east of the locality (18.6666°S 146.1666°E). It takes its name from the Tokalon railway station, which was named by the Queensland Railways Department on 24 December 1924, from the name of a local selection. Tokalan is an Aboriginal word meaning beautiful land.

== History ==
=== Aboriginal history ===
Prior to European settlement, the Ingham area was inhabited by the Warakamai People. Warrgamay (also known as Waragamai, Wargamay, Wargamaygan, Biyay, and Warakamai) is an Australian Aboriginal language in North Queensland. The language region includes the Herbert River area, Ingham, Hawkins Creek, Long Pocket, Herbert Vale, Niagara Vale, Yamanic Creek, Herbert Gorge, Cardwell, Hinchinbrook Island and the adjacent mainland.

=== British colonisation ===
George Elphinstone Dalrymple led the first British expedition to the area during his 1864 journey from Cardwell to the Valley of Lagoons Station. Dalrymple named the Herbert River on this expedition and described both the extensive grassy plains that flanked the river and the "tribe of wild blacks" who lived upon them. Co-owner of Valley of Lagoons, Walter Jervoise Scott, soon established the Herbert Vale cattle station on these plains which was managed by Henry Worsley Stone and Duncan McAuslan. In 1868, the region was opened to further uptake of land by colonists, with Daniel Cudmore and Maurice Geoffrey O'Connell being the most prominent selectors.

This taking of land led to conflict between the British colonists and the resident Indigenous population of the region. In the early 1870s, Native Police forces based at Waterview under the charge of Sub-Inspectors Thomas Coward and Ferdinand Macquarie Tompson, conducted missions to "disperse" groups of "very troublesome" Aboriginal people along the Herbert River. Cattle continued to be speared and in 1872 a Native Police detachment captured a group of Aborigines at Daniel Cudmore's property. They were made to gather firewood and were then shot, their corpses being burnt on the gathered wood. In 1873, the local Native Police barracks were moved to Fort Herbert (just west of the modern day town of Ingham) and placed under the command of Sub-Inspector Robert Arthur Johnstone. Over the next seven years, Johnstone conducted numerous punitive expeditions, "dispersing mobs" of Aboriginal people around the Herbert River region. James Cassady, a colonist who attempted to protect Aborigines in the region, described how Native Police officers during this period would order the shootings of peaceful Aboriginal people. In once instance, two young boys who survived these shootings were taken and given as presents to other colonists. The Native Police forces in the Ingham region were disbanded in 1881.

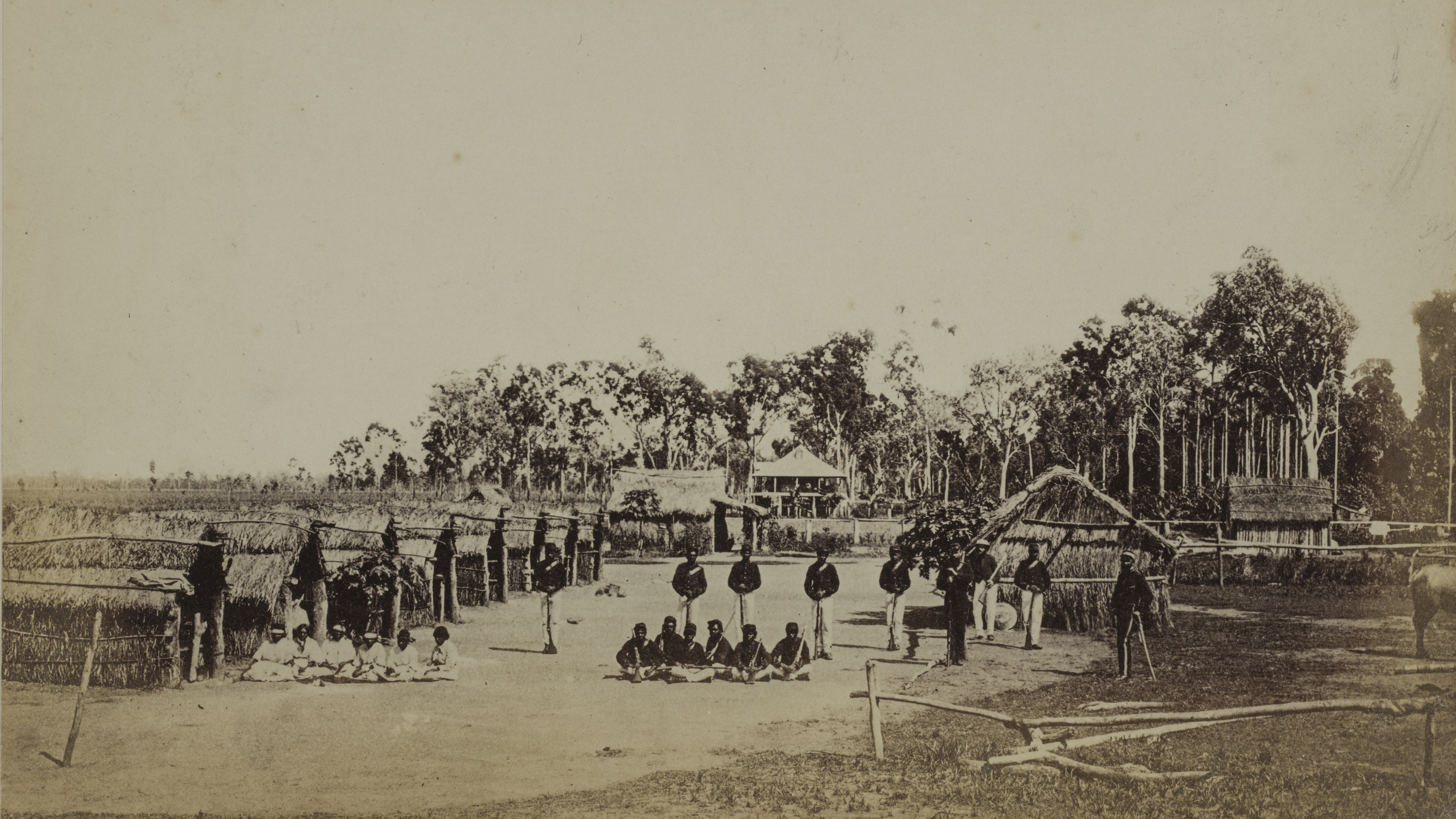
Herbert River Native Mounted Police Camp near Palm Creek in the 1870s

=== Sugar plantations and mills ===
The region was found to be ideal for the cultivation of sugarcane and Maurice Geoffrey O'Connell is regarded as the first to plant the crop in the Herbert River area. He, however, soon committed suicide and other entrepreneurs expanded the industry. In 1870, James MacKenzie established the Gairloch plantation, Farrand Haig and Henry Miles founded the Bemerside plantation, while Arthur Neame and Edwin Waller established the Macknade plantation. The first local sugar mill was constructed in 1872 at the Gairloch property, with the Bemerside and Macknade mills opening the following year. These operations came into financial difficulty and the Hamleigh Sugar Company with Alfred Cowley as manager became the dominant sugar enterprise in the region by 1883. However, with significant government assistance, the Colonial Sugar Refining Company (CSR) monopolised the Hebert valley sugar production by 1886, purchasing most of the plantations, buying the Macknade mill and establishing its own mill in 1883 at the Victoria Plantation. The Macknade and Victoria mills are still in operation and are owned by Wilmar Sugar Australia.

Most of the labour on these plantations during the early years was performed by imported South Sea Islanders who were required to work for three years earning only £6 per annum which was paid out at the end of the contract, often in cheap goods instead of money. At CSR's Victoria Plantation, the Islanders wore a tin disc around theirs necks with a number stamped on it and although they were provided with a hospital, the amount of sickness and death among them was very high, the mortality rate in 1884 being up to 15%. The hospital itself was a temporary structure in which the Islanders were locked in unattended at night. There is a recorded incident where a fight broke out, resulting in a death and mass injury.

In 1885, a Royal Commission found that Islanders destined to work at Alfred Cowley's Hamleigh Plantation were blackbirded in that they were recruited in a way that was "cruelly deceptive and altogether illegal". Likewise, the Commission found that many Islanders were deliberately kidnapped or murdered during a recruiting voyage for CSR's Victoria Plantation, describing it as a record of deceit, cruel treachery and inhuman slaughter. In 1886, both the CSR and Hamleigh companies received government compensation for the removal and repatriation of some of the Islanders who had survived these recruiting events. This money was given despite an inquiry showing that the annual death rate of South Sea Islanders was as high as 17.5% at both these plantations. The use of Islander labour continued on the Herbert River valley until the early 1900s.

=== Township of Ingham ===
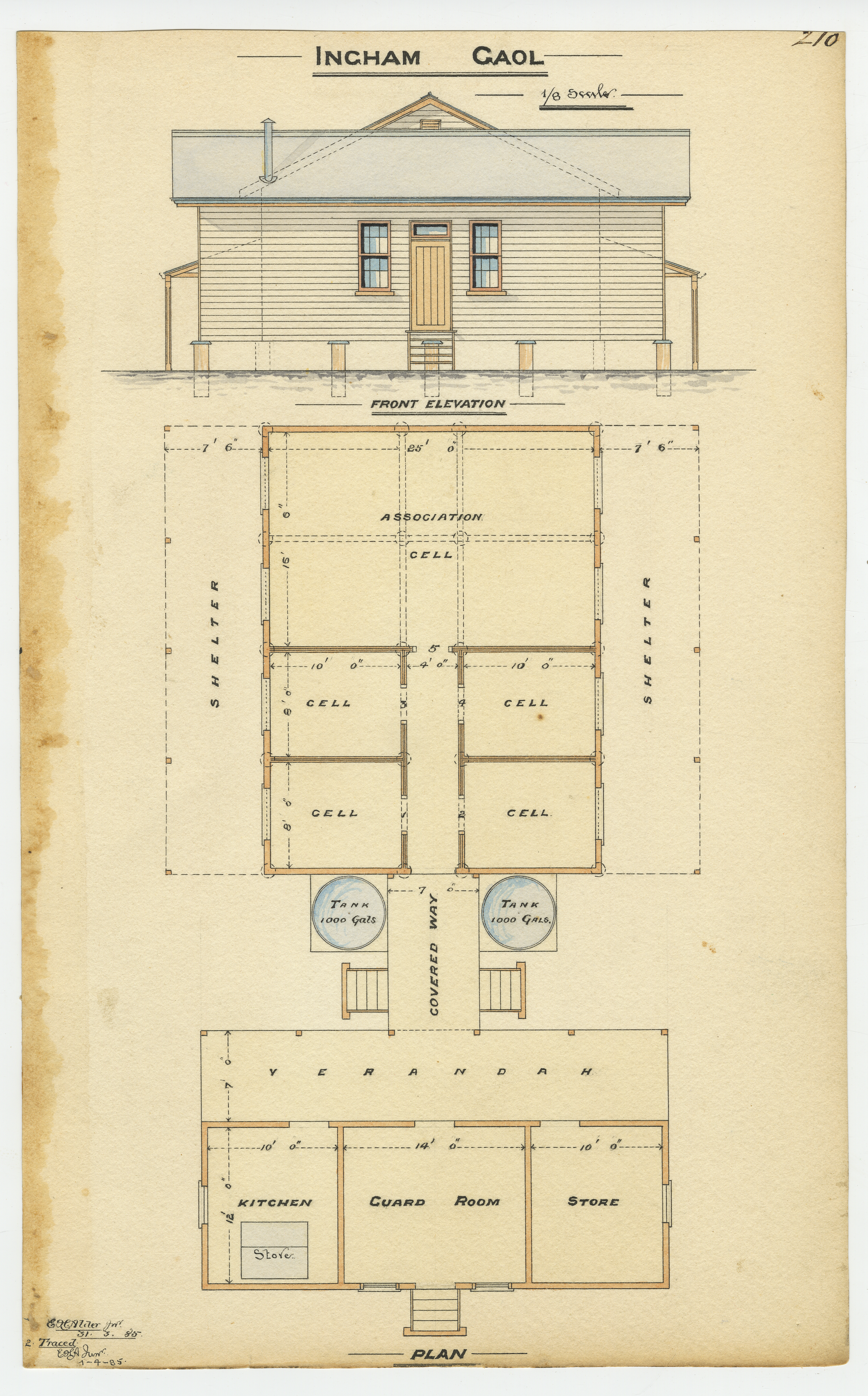
Architectural plans for Ingham Gaol

A cluster of a few huts known simply as Lower Herbert was established in 1871 which included a post office. A township was gazetted on this site in 1879 and named Ingham, after William Bairstow Ingham, a pioneer sugar planter on the Herbert River.

Ingham State School opened on 4 May 1885 and celebrated its Golden Jubilee (50th anniversary) in December 1935. On Saturday 4 May 1985, the school celebrated its centenary by planting a tree at the school's original location (18.6522°S 146.1592°E).

A gaol opened in July 1886; previously there had only been a police lock-up.

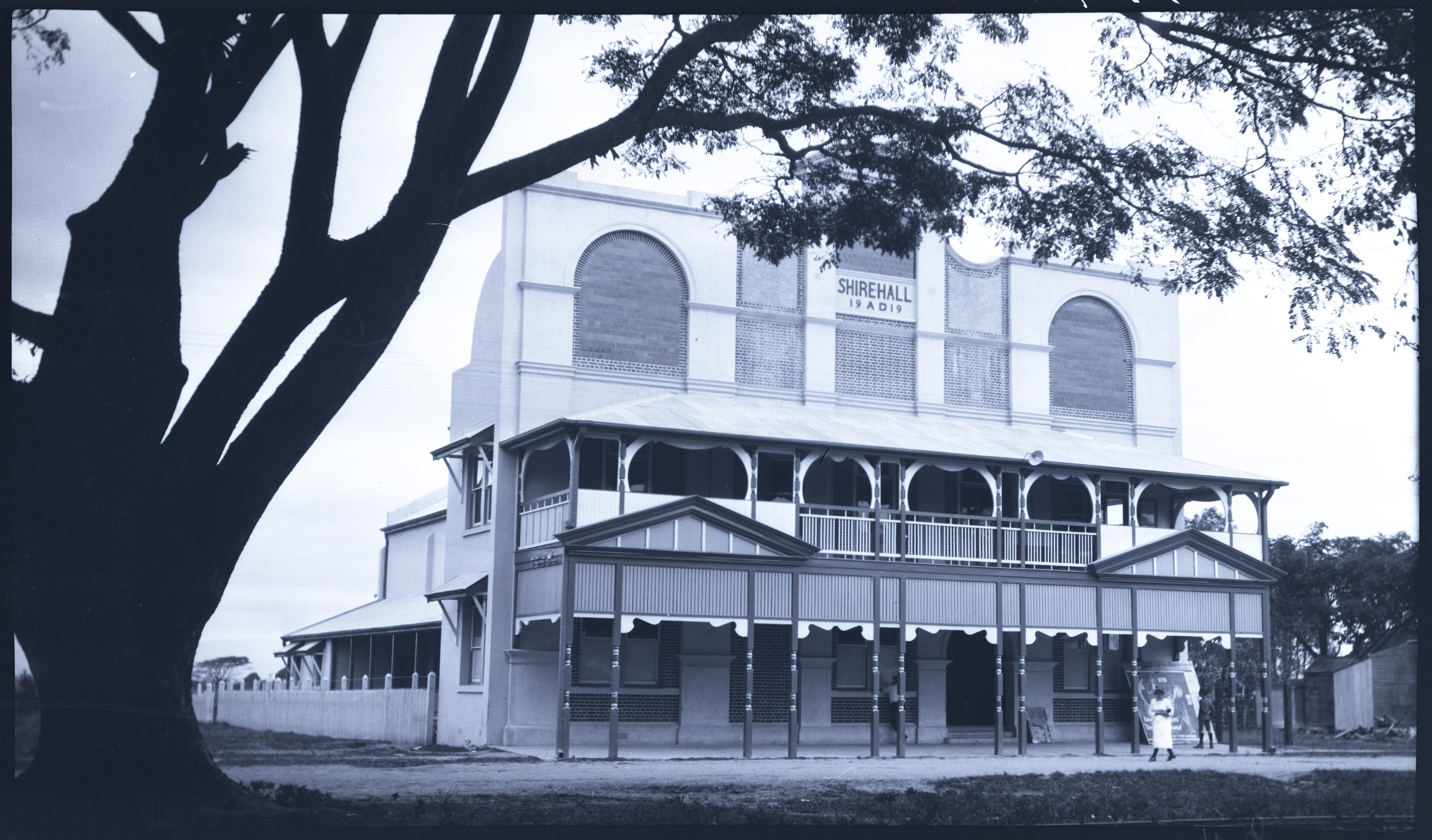
Shire hall, Ingham, circa 1930

The town has a strong Italian and Spanish history with the 1920s and 1930s seeing a large influx of immigrants from these countries. The Black Hand Gang, made up of some of these immigrants, terrorised the town in the 1930s with bribery and corruption, forming a dark chapter in the town's history.

Ingham State High School opened on 2 February 1952.

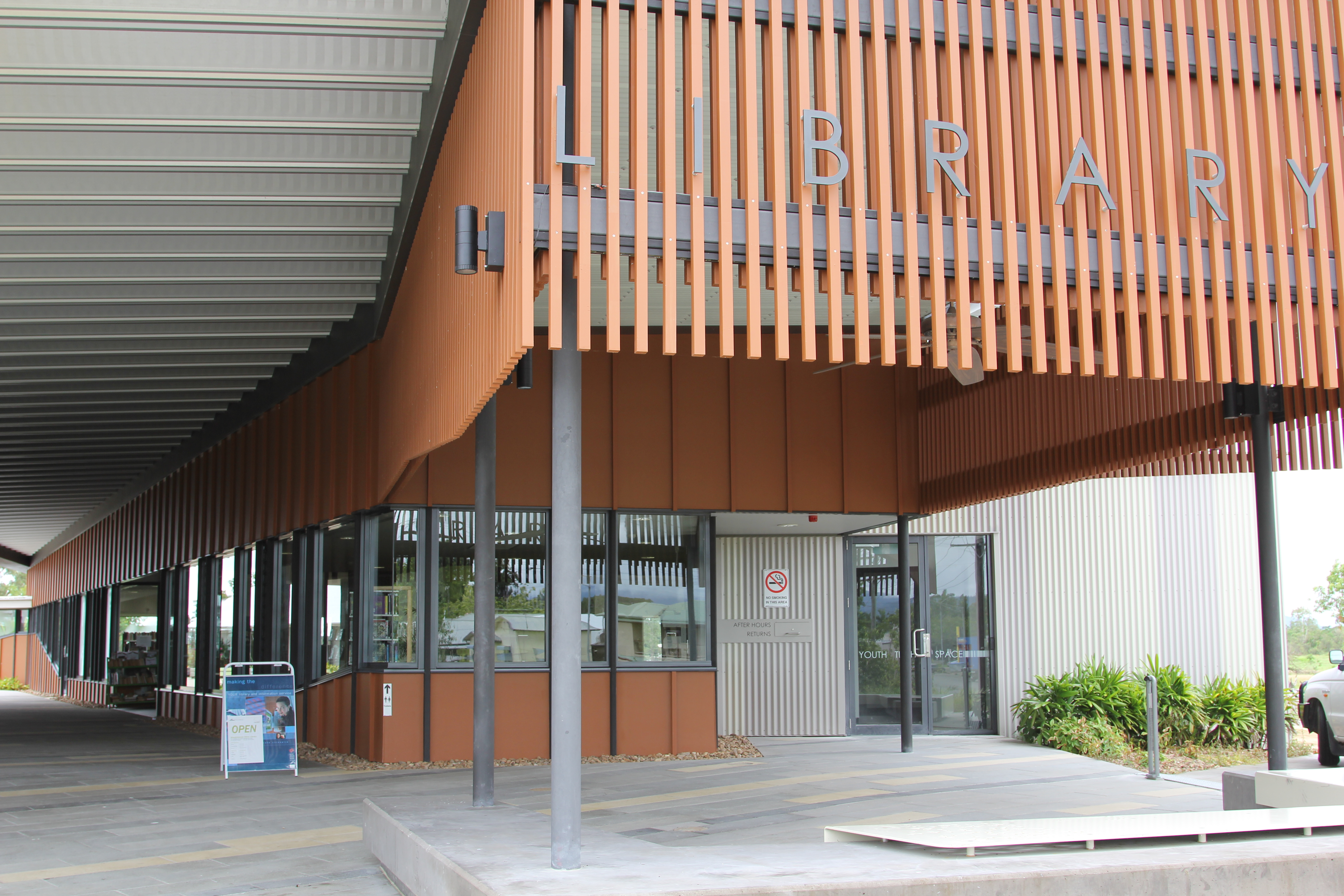
Hinchinbrook Shire Library

Hinchinbrook Shire Library opened in 2011 in Ingham.

Following the devastation caused by Cyclone Yasi in Far North Queensland in February 2011, Ingham is one of a number of towns where a cyclone shelter was built. The Ingham cyclone shelter is capable of withstanding winds of more than 300 kilometres (190 mi) per hour, as experienced in a category five cyclone. The building serves as a multi-purpose sports facility for the Ingham State High School while in a cyclone it provides shelter for up to 800 people. The shelter was opened by Premier Campbell Newman in January 2013.

In March 2018, flood waters inundated properties in Ingham following heavy rain.

In February 2025, the town was subject to a flood again which was described by local residents as being worse than the previous one. This flood washed away part of the Bruce Highway between Ingham and Townsville, halting all freight and food delivery to towns north of Ingham.

== Demographics ==
In the 2016 census, the locality of Ingham had a population of 4,426 people. Aboriginal and Torres Strait Islander people made up 7.6% of the population. 81.2% of people were born in Australia. The next most common country of birth was Italy at 5.0%. 82.5% of people spoke only English at home. Other languages spoken at home included Italian at 7.2%. The most common responses for religion were Catholic 45.8%, Anglican 15.5%, No Religion 13.1%.

In the 2021 census, the locality of Ingham had a population of 4,455 people. Aboriginal and Torres Strait Islander people made up 9.7% of the population. 81.0% of people were born in Australia. The next most common country of birth was Italy at 3.2%. 84.5% of people spoke only English at home. Other languages spoken at home included Italian at 3.8%. The most common responses for religion were Catholic 42.2%, No Religion 22.1%, Anglican 12.3%, Uniting Church 5.6%.

== Heritage listings ==
Ingham has a number of heritage-listed sites, including:

- Ingham Post Office, 15 Lannercost Street
- Ruth Fairfax House, 5 Lynch Street
- Gairloch Bridge, Old Bruce Highway between Foresthome and Gairloch
- Ingham Court House, 35–39 Palm Terrace

== Climate ==
Ingham experiences a tropical monsoon climate (Koppen: Am), with a prolonged wet season from November to May and a cooler, less humid dry season from June to October. Being part of the Queensland Wet Tropics bioregion, the annual rainfall in Ingham is very high, averaging 2,126.5 millimetres (83.72 in), primarily concentrated in the austral summer. Extreme temperatures in Ingham have ranged from 43.4 °C (110.1 °F) on 5 January 1994 to 2.2 °C (36.0 °F) on 24 July 1968.

Climate data for Ingham (18º39'00"S, 146º10'48"E, 12 m AMSL) (1968–2024 normals and extremes)
Month	Jan	Feb	Mar	Apr	May	Jun	Jul	Aug	Sep	Oct	Nov	Dec	Year
Record high °C (°F)	43.4 (110.1)	40.6 (105.1)	40.1 (104.2)	37.0 (98.6)	33.0 (91.4)	32.0 (89.6)	32.8 (91.0)	34.0 (93.2)	37.0 (98.6)	38.8 (101.8)	43.1 (109.6)	43.4 (110.1)	43.4 (110.1)
Mean daily maximum °C (°F)	32.4 (90.3)	31.8 (89.2)	30.7 (87.3)	29.1 (84.4)	27.1 (80.8)	25.3 (77.5)	24.9 (76.8)	26.2 (79.2)	28.4 (83.1)	30.4 (86.7)	31.8 (89.2)	32.5 (90.5)	29.2 (84.6)
Mean daily minimum °C (°F)	23.0 (73.4)	23.2 (73.8)	22.3 (72.1)	20.4 (68.7)	17.8 (64.0)	14.9 (58.8)	13.8 (56.8)	14.3 (57.7)	16.1 (61.0)	18.5 (65.3)	20.7 (69.3)	22.1 (71.8)	18.9 (66.1)
Record low °C (°F)	16.6 (61.9)	17.8 (64.0)	15.0 (59.0)	10.7 (51.3)	6.2 (43.2)	5.2 (41.4)	2.2 (36.0)	4.5 (40.1)	4.4 (39.9)	9.5 (49.1)	12.7 (54.9)	15.6 (60.1)	2.2 (36.0)
Average precipitation mm (inches)	391.7 (15.42)	480.2 (18.91)	393.9 (15.51)	208.9 (8.22)	109.6 (4.31)	45.4 (1.79)	41.5 (1.63)	34.9 (1.37)	37.2 (1.46)	53.7 (2.11)	114.2 (4.50)	209.4 (8.24)	2,120.6 (83.47)
Average precipitation days (≥ 1.0 mm)	13.9	16.1	14.7	13.4	10.6	6.2	5.6	4.6	4.4	5.9	8.1	9.6	113.1
Average afternoon relative humidity (%)	64	69	66	68	65	62	58	57	54	55	57	60	61
Average dew point °C (°F)	23.1 (73.6)	23.6 (74.5)	22.3 (72.1)	20.8 (69.4)	18.5 (65.3)	16.1 (61.0)	14.4 (57.9)	15.1 (59.2)	16.7 (62.1)	18.7 (65.7)	20.5 (68.9)	22.1 (71.8)	19.3 (66.8)
Source: Bureau of Meteorology (1968–2024 normals and extremes)

== Economy ==
Ingham is the service centre for many sugarcane plantations, which are serviced by the two sugar mills located in the Ingham district: Victoria Sugar Mill (located approximately 6 kilometres (3.7 mi) from Ingham), which is the largest sugar mill in Australia and one of the largest in the southern hemisphere, and Macknade Mill, which is the oldest operating sugar mill in Queensland. Both mills are owned and operated by Wilmar Sugar Australia Limited. The majority of the cane is transported to the mills by light tramlines. Once processed by the mills, the raw sugar is then transported by tramline to the bulk sugar terminal at the nearby seaside port of Lucinda and loaded onto ships for export via the longest pier in the southern hemisphere (4.75 kilometres (2.95 mi) long).

Other industries in the Ingham area include cattle, watermelons, rice, horticulture, fishing, timber and tourism.

== Education ==
Ingham State School is a government primary (Early Childhood to Year 6) school for boys and girls at 28 McIlwraith Street (18.6525°S 146.1615°E). In 2018, the school had an enrolment of 334 students with 29 teachers (24 full-time equivalent) and 25 non-teaching staff (13 full-time equivalent). It includes a special education program.

Our Lady of Lourdes Primary School is a Catholic primary (Prep–6) school for boys and girls at 18 Abbott Street (18.6538°S 146.1592°E). In 2018, the school had an enrolment of 288 students with 20 teachers (18 full-time equivalent) and 17 non-teaching staff (10 full-time equivalent).

Hinchinbrook Christian School is a private primary and secondary (Prep–10) school for boys and girls at 77 Halifax Road (18.6387°S 146.1676°E). In 2018, the school had an enrolment of 13 students with 3 teachers and 0 non-teaching staff. The school also provides distance education.

Ingham State High School is a government secondary (7–12) school for boys and girls at 12 Menzies Street (18.6537°S 146.1686°E). In 2024, the school had an enrolment of 362 students with 42 teachers (39.5 full-time equivalent) and 29 non-teaching staff (21.8 full-time equivalent). It includes a special education program.

Gilroy Santa Maria College is a Catholic secondary (7–12) school for boys and girls at 17 Chamberlain Street (18.6445°S 146.1555°E). In 2018, the school had an enrolment of 291 students with 33 teachers (29 full-time equivalent) and 26 non-teaching staff (18 full-time equivalent).

== Amenities ==
The town is home to the regional art gallery called TYTO Regional Art Gallery which sits alongside the Tyto Wetlands. In the same precinct is the Hinchinbrook Shire Library located at 73–75 McIllwraith Street.

== Media ==
The Herbert River Express is a newspaper published in Ingham since 1904.

== Events ==
The Australian-Italian Festival is held in Ingham the first weekend in August each year and is one of the most popular events in the region, with thousands of people attending the event. The festival celebrates Ingham's cultural background, dating from the 1890s, when the first Italian immigrants came to the region. More than half the population of the town are of Italian descent. The town is known as "Little Italy". The annual festival, held at Tyto Wetlands, began as an idea from a community workshop.

== Notable residents ==
Notable individuals from Ingham include:

- Sam Backo, rugby league player
- Harriett Brims, pioneer female photographer
- David Crisafulli, 41st Premier of Queensland
- Tracey Curro, journalist
- Francis Patrick Donovan, ambassador
- Greg Dowling, rugby league player
- Nick Euclid, rugby league player
- Arthur Fadden, 13th Prime Minister of Australia
- Eric Feldt, Head of the Coastwatchers in WWII
- Beryl Friday, netballer
- Joice NanKivell Loch, humanitarian worker
- Keith Payne, Victoria Cross recipient
- Ted Row, politician
- Dean Schifilliti, rugby league player
- Ashleigh Southern, water polo player
- Laurie Spina, rugby league player
- Paul Ettore Tabone, actor, operatic tenor
