= William Bairstow Ingham =

(1850–1878) trader and government agent

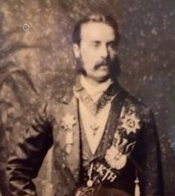
William Bairstow Ingham

William Bairstow Ingham (4 June 1850 – 28 November 1878) was a British colonist who operated a sugarcane plantation in the lower Herbert River region and was an agent for the colonial Government of Queensland during the early years of the British occupation of New Guinea. The town of Ingham in North Queensland is named after him.

== Early life ==
William B. Ingham was born in 1850 at Blake Hall, which was the Ingham family mansion in Mirfield, Yorkshire. His parents were Joshua Ingham, a wealthy businessman who owned mines and mills, and Mary Cunliffe Lister. A young Anne Brontë was employed as a governess at Blake Hall to educate the Ingham children, whose behaviour included spitting at her and throwing her belongings out the window. Brontë described the children as being "desperate little dunces" and later integrated her experiences at Blake Hall into her debut novel Agnes Grey.

William was educated at Malvern College and later went to University College, Oxford but dropped out before completing his studies. He briefly joined the Royal Navy but soon found that the strict discipline was unsuited to his disposition. With a considerable amount of money acquired through his family, he decided in 1873 to travel to the British colonies in Australia where he joined his brother at the Malahide property near Fingal in Tasmania.

== Queensland ==
In 1874, Ingham bought land in the lower Herbert River valley and established a sugarcane plantation which he named Ings. He used South Sea Islander labour to clear the land, plant the crops and build a sugar mill. A plant disease destroyed his sugarcane crop in 1875, causing up to £60,000 of financial losses for Ingham. He abandoned growing sugar and instead constructed a saw mill and bought a small stern-wheel paddle steamer to ferry goods on the Herbert River and along the coast. The boat was named Louisa.

In 1876, Ingham utilised his vessel to assist Sub-Inspector Robert Arthur Johnstone of the Native Police in his expedition to find a supply route and a suitable port for the Hodgkinson goldfields. This port became known as Cairns. During this expedition, Ingham and Johnstone became the first Britishers to sail up what Johnstone had named the Barron River.

Ingham established a saw mill and built a wharf at the new port of Cairns. He also continued to captain the Louisa which made regular trips to the ports of Cooktown and Cardwell. In his memoirs, Sub-Inspector Johnstone recalled how Ingham placed the mummified remains of an Aboriginal person on the water-tank on board the Louisa which subsequently caused an illness among the passengers. Johnstone had given Ingham the corpse, one of several that he had taken from huts along the coast.

== New Guinea ==
Acting on reports that gold was to be found in the vicinity of Port Moresby in New Guinea, Ingham borrowed money in early 1878 and chartered a vessel to go there to establish a trading store. Port Moresby at the time was little more than a missionary outpost and Ingham was one of only a few Europeans to reside there. A large group of prospectors aboard the Colonist arrived at the port in April 1878 and Ingham was appointed as an "agent for Government of Queensland". Although his role had no legal authority he oversaw the registering of land purchases from the Indigenous people, held courts and punished "natives". The British High Commissioner for the Western Pacific, Sir Arthur Gordon, advised that Ingham's role be reined in to avoid embarrassment.

While in his role as government agent at Port Moresby, Ingham made a series of rules for the prospectors to follow, and wrote a document on behalf of the local Indigenous leaders claiming that they were begging to be governed as a territory of Queensland. Ingham tried to place himself in a position where if a significant goldfield was established, the Queensland authorities would appoint him to a high-ranking official role in the region. However, gold was not found in great amounts by the prospectors and Ingham's role of government agent soon lapsed and he returned to Cairns.

In Cairns, Ingham focused his efforts on quickly returning to New Guinea as a trader. He re-floated the Louisa, which had sunk in the muddy shallows of Trinity Inlet while he was in Port Moresby, and renamed the vessel as Voura. He repaired and stocked the vessel and with a crew of five others including artist James H. Shaw, Ingham sailed for New Guinea in September 1878. On reaching New Guinea, Ingham decided to cruise and explore the delta of the Fly River. Here they had a skirmish with a large number of Indigenous men in a flotilla of canoes, with Ingham having a "pretty lively" time with his Snider–Enfield rifle shooting at those in the canoes and at the community on the shore.

They arrived at Port Moresby, where Ingham heard of the killing of Captain Edwin Redlich's beche de mer fishing crew at Utian Island (also known as Brooker Island) in the Louisiade Archipelago to the east. Ingham decided that if he could salvage the equipment from this abandoned fishing station, he could go into business as a beche-de-mer producer on a nearby island with little cost. He resupplied the Voura and took on four additional crew members and headed to Utian Island.

== Death and aftermath ==
The Islanders of Utian had a recent history of killing unwelcome visitors to their island, massacring two groups of Redlich's beche-de-mer operators since the start of 1878. Ingham, therefore, went well armed with muskets, rifles, revolvers and a nine-pound and two four-pound cannons attached to the Voura. Despite expecting violence, Ingham and his crew were welcomed by the people of Utian when he arrived there on 24 November 1878, organising him a feast and helping him collect the beche-de-mer equipment. However, the Islanders had previously planned to deceive Ingham's group and kill them once they had gained their confidence. On the third day Ingham was at Utian, the Islanders attacked, murdering him and six of his crew. One of the crew, a Wari Islander named Joe, escaped on a boat to nearby Misima Island. He stated that he hid and watched as the entire party was roasted in stone ovens and eaten. When later questioned about the cause of the massacre, the Islanders stated that the foreigners were killed for abusing their women and threatening to kill their men. The Islanders also stripped the Voura and took possession of the firearms and ammunition.

When news of Ingham's and the crew's murder and cannibalisation reached the Australian colonies, newspapers such as The Queenslander called for "swift and severe punishment" of the "treacherous and bloodthirsty savages" of Utian Island. It was suggested that a Royal Navy war vessel from the Australia Station be despatched immediately and that "every male native in the village at Brooker Island of 15 years up to the oldest greybeard of the tribe has deserved death".

In April 1879, HMS Cormorant commanded by Captain James Bruce sailed to Utian Island and attempted negotiations with the islanders, which were unsuccessful. Captain Bruce then left the island, but not before bombarding it with around twenty exploding projectiles. The bombardment did little apparent damage and it was feared that the islanders, who appeared to be led by a highly capable Torres Strait Islander named Billy, were becoming increasingly confident and could ignite a general uprising against the colonisers in the region.

The visit of HMS Cormorant was deemed unsatisfactory and in June, Commodore John Wilson sailed to Utian in the 17-gun flagship HMS Wolverine to conduct a punitive expedition. Early in the morning of 11 June Wilson ordered a detachment of a hundred well-armed marines to attack the island. They captured and burned all the large sailing canoes, and shot an islander dead. The marines scoured the island but were unable to locate any further people or the remains of Ingham. The next day, Wilson ordered the destruction of Utian. All the villages and farms on the island were burnt to the ground and every coconut tree was cut down.

== Legacy ==
In 1879, the new township on the Herbert River, where he was a popular identity, was named Ingham in his honour.
