= Sabari Island =

Island in Papua New Guinea

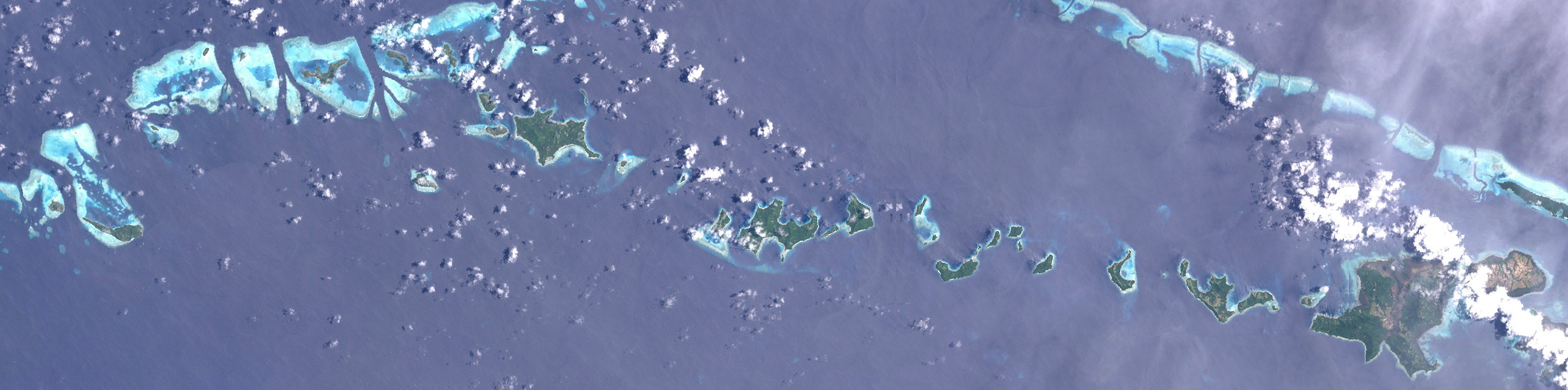
- Satellite image

- Location within Papua New Guinea

Geography
- Location: Oceania
- Coordinates: 11°07′S 153°06′E
- Archipelago: Louisiade Archipelago
- Adjacent to: Solomon Sea
- Total islands: 1
- Major islands: Sabari
- Area: 4.04 km^{2} (1.56 sq mi)
- Highest elevation: 55 m (180 ft)
- Highest point: Mount Sabari

Administration
- Papua New Guinea
- Province: Milne Bay
- District: Samarai-Murua District
- LLG: Louisiade Rural LLG
- Island Group: Calvados Chain
- Largest settlement: Hekampan (pop. 300)

Demographics
- Population: 708 (2014)
- Pop. density: 175/km^{2} (453/sq mi)
- Ethnic groups: Papauans, Austronesians, Melanesians.

Additional information
- Time zone: AEST (UTC+10)
- ISO code: PG-MBA
- Official website: www.ncdc.gov.pg

Sabari Island is an island in Papua New Guinea, part of the Calvados Chain within the Louisiade Archipelago. Politically, it is in its own separate Ward, not like the other Calvados Chain islands which all belong to the Calvados Chain Ward. It is located at a reef called Tawa Tawamal . It is the most populated island of the group. The main villages are Hekampen (at the southeastern tip), Tandeyai (south coast of the northwestern part), Hebenahine, and Maho.
