= Panarairai Island =

Island of Papua New Guinea

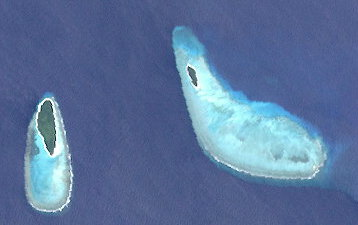
- Jomard Islands: Pana Waipona (left) and Panarairai (right)

- Location within Papua New Guinea

Geography
- Location: Oceania
- Coordinates: 11°15′13″S 152°08′15″E
- Archipelago: Louisiade Archipelago
- Adjacent to: Solomon Sea
- Total islands: 1
- Major islands: Panarairai
- Area: 0.17 km^{2} (0.066 sq mi)

Administration
- Papua New Guinea
- Province: Milne Bay
- District: Samarai-Murua District
- LLG: Louisiade Rural Local Level Government Area
- Island Group: Jomard Islands

Demographics
- Population: 0 (2014)
- Pop. density: 0/km^{2} (0/sq mi)
- Ethnic groups: Papauans, Austronesians, Melanesians.

Additional information
- Time zone: AEST (UTC+10)
- ISO code: PG-MBA
- Official website: www.ncdc.gov.pg

Panarairai Island is an island of Papua New Guinea. It is the smaller of the Jomard Islands within the Louisiade Archipelago.
