= Misima language =

Austronesian language spoken in Papua New Guinea

Misima
- Misima-Panaeati
- Region: Milne Bay Province, Papua New Guinea
- Native speakers: 18,000 (2002); 4,000 monolinguals
- Language family: Austronesian: Malayo-Polynesian; Oceanic; Western; Papuan Tip; Peripheral; Kilivila–Misima; Misima
- Writing system: Latin

Language codes
- ISO 639-3: mpx
- Glottolog: misi1243

Misima-Panaeati, also called Misiman or panapanaeati, is an indigenous Austronesian language spoken on the islands of Misima, Panaeati, and the islands of the eastern half of the Calvados Chain of Papua New Guinea.

== Phonology ==
=== Vowels ===
Misima-Paneati has five vowel phonemes.

	Front	Back
High	i /i/	u /u/
Mid	e /e/	o /o/
Low	a /a/~/ə/~/ʌ/	

=== Consonants ===
Misima-Paneati has 17 consonant phonemes.

		Bilabial		Alveolar	Palatal	Velar		Glottal
		Plain	Labialized	Alveolar	Palatal	Plain	Labialized	Plain
Stop	Voiceless	p /p/	pw /pʷ/	t /t/		k /k/		
Stop	Voiced	b /b/	bw /bʷ/	d /d/		g /ɡ/	gw /ɡʷ/	
Nasal		m /m/	mw /mʷ/	n /n/~/ŋ/				
Fricative	Voiceless			s /s/				h /h/
Fricative	Voiced	v /β/						
Approximant					y /j/~/ʝ/			
Lateral approximant				l /l/				

=== Syllables ===
In Misima-Paneati, the following syllable types commonly occur: V, CV, CVC, and VC.

The open syllables V and CV are found in all positions of words, whereas the closed syllables CVC and VC are only found word finally and across morpheme boundaries, with the exception of the following five words:

- /ˈamna/ – 'feelings'
- /ˈkimpos/ – 'centre pole'
- /kinˈbʷai/ – 'fingernail'
- /sinˈɡili/ – 'centre rib of coconut leaf'
- /tabˈnaha/ – 'sneeze'

The only monomorphemic consonant clusters that always occur across syllable boundaries are:

- /mn/
- /mp/
- /nb/
- /nɡ/
- /bn/
