= Hastings Island (Western Australia) =

Island near Esperance, Western Australia

Hastings Island (34°05′54″S 122°07′02″E) is located off the south coast of Western Australia near Esperance and Cape Le Grand National Park.
