= Utian Island =

Island in Papua New Guinea

Nickname: Brooker Island
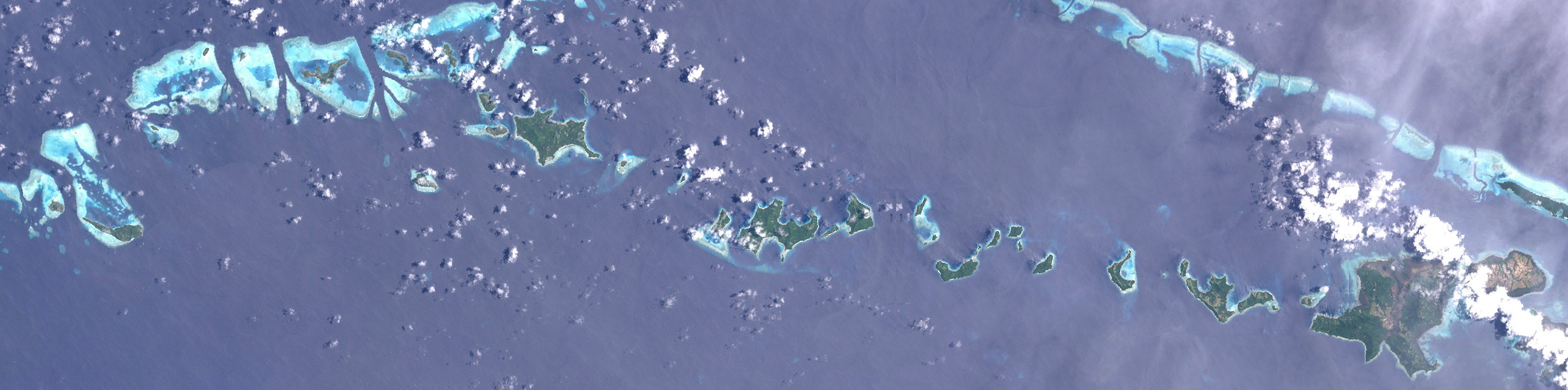
- Satellite image

- Location within Papua New Guinea

Geography
- Location: Oceania
- Coordinates: 11°03′S 152°27′E
- Archipelago: Louisiade Archipelago
- Adjacent to: Solomon Sea
- Total islands: 1
- Major islands: Utian
- Area: 1.54 km^{2} (0.59 sq mi)
- Highest elevation: 141 m (463 ft)
- Highest point: Mount Utian

Administration
- Papua New Guinea
- Province: Milne Bay
- District: Samarai-Murua District
- LLG: Louisiade Rural LLG
- Island Group: Calvados Chain
- Largest settlement: Utian (pop. 400)

Demographics
- Population: 514 (2014)
- Pop. density: 333.7/km^{2} (864.3/sq mi)
- Ethnic groups: Papauans, Austronesians, Melanesians.

Additional information
- Time zone: AEST (UTC+10)
- ISO code: PG-MBA
- Official website: www.ncdc.gov.pg

Utian Island, also known as Brooker Island, is an island in Papua New Guinea, part of the Calvados Chain within the Louisiade Archipelago. It is located at the western end of the Calvados Chain, in the Louisiade Archipelago, in the Milne Bay Province.

== History ==
In the late 19th century, the inhabitants of Utian had a reputation for violence and cannibalism against visitors, with one source describing it as a "nest of cannibal pirates". In 1878, a bêche-de-mer station established on Utian by Edwin Redlich was destroyed and its crew killed. Several months later Redlich sent a party led by John McOrt to retrieve his property, which resulted in McOrt, four other Europeans and several Melanesian crew members being killed. Henry Chester, the Queensland police magistrate on Thursday Island, also documented a massacre of ten visitors from the Engineer Islands and several other instances of violence, and requested permission from the Queensland government to launch a punitive expedition.

In November 1878, William Bairstow Ingham launched a private expedition to retrieve Redlich's equipment on his trading vessel Voura, despite the attempts of missionary Samuel MacFarlane to dissuade him. Ingham and eight of his crew members were killed and cannibalised, with only their pilot, a Wari Islander named Joe, escaping to inform MacFarlane of the massacre. According to Joe's testimony, the islanders staged a feast for Ingham and his crew as a ruse, then set upon them when they were distracted. Joe managed to hide and escape where he "watched the entire party roasted in stone ovens and eaten".

HMS Cormorant visited Utian in April 1879, but was ordered not to land and instead "steamed halfway around the island firing about twenty shells at random". The visit did not intimidate the islanders as intended and instead provoked further threats. HMS Wolverine, the flagship of the Australia Station, finally launched an expedition against Utian in June 1879, with John Wilson landing a party which retrieved Ingham's papers, captured several hostages and killed one islander.
