= Louisiade Rural LLG =

Local-level government in Papua New Guinea

- Country: Papua New Guinea
- Province: Milne Bay Province
- Seat: Bwagaoia on Misima Island
- Time zone: UTC+10 (AEST)

The Louisiade Rural LLG is a local level government in the Milne Bay Province of Papua New Guinea. The LLG is situated in the central part of Louisiade Archipelago with Misima Island. At the 2011 census, it contained 23,335 residents living in 4,542 households. The LLG president is Solomon J Paulisbo. It launched its own microfinance scheme in December 2016.

== Wards ==
- 01. Mwabua
- 02. Narian
- 03. Bwagaoia
- 04. Hinaota
- 05. Kaubwaga
- 06. Boiou
- 07. Siagara East
- 08. Siagara West
- 09. Gulewa
- 10. East Liak
- 11. West Liak
- 12. Bagilina
- 13. Ewena
- 14. Ebora
- 15. Bwagabwaga
- 16. Awaibi
- 17. Alhoga
- 18. Eaus North
- 19. Eaus South
- 20. Gaibobo
- 21. Kimuta
- 22. West Panaeati
- 23. East Panaeati
- 24. Panapompom
- 25. Brooker Island
- 26. Motorina East
- 27. Motorina West
- 28. Bagaman
- 29. Panaumala
- 30. Baimatana
- 31. Loba
- 32. Bwana
