= List of islands of Papua New Guinea =

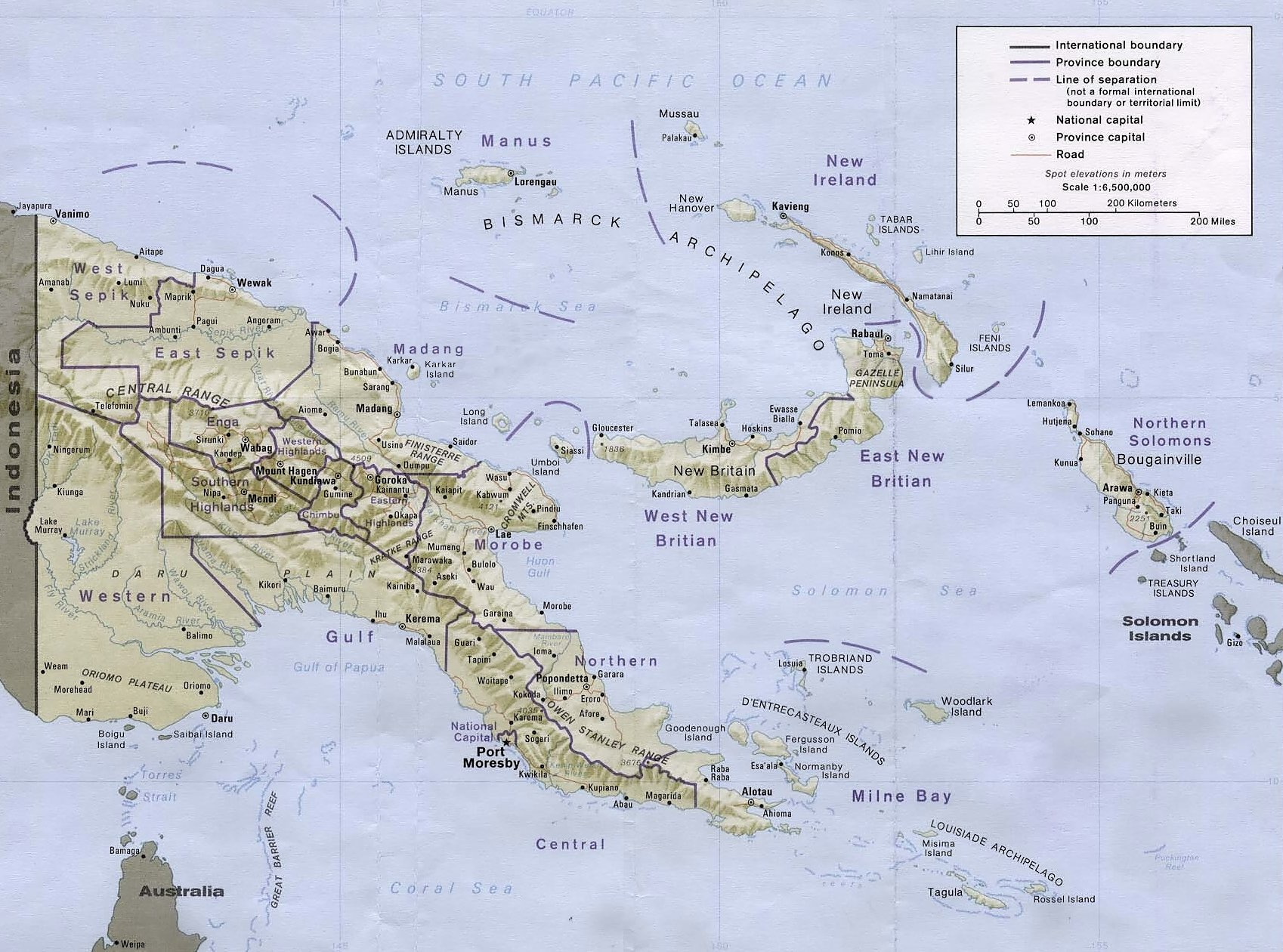
Map of Papua New Guinea

This is a list of islands in Papua New Guinea, as to most of its 600 main islands, by province listed NW to SE.

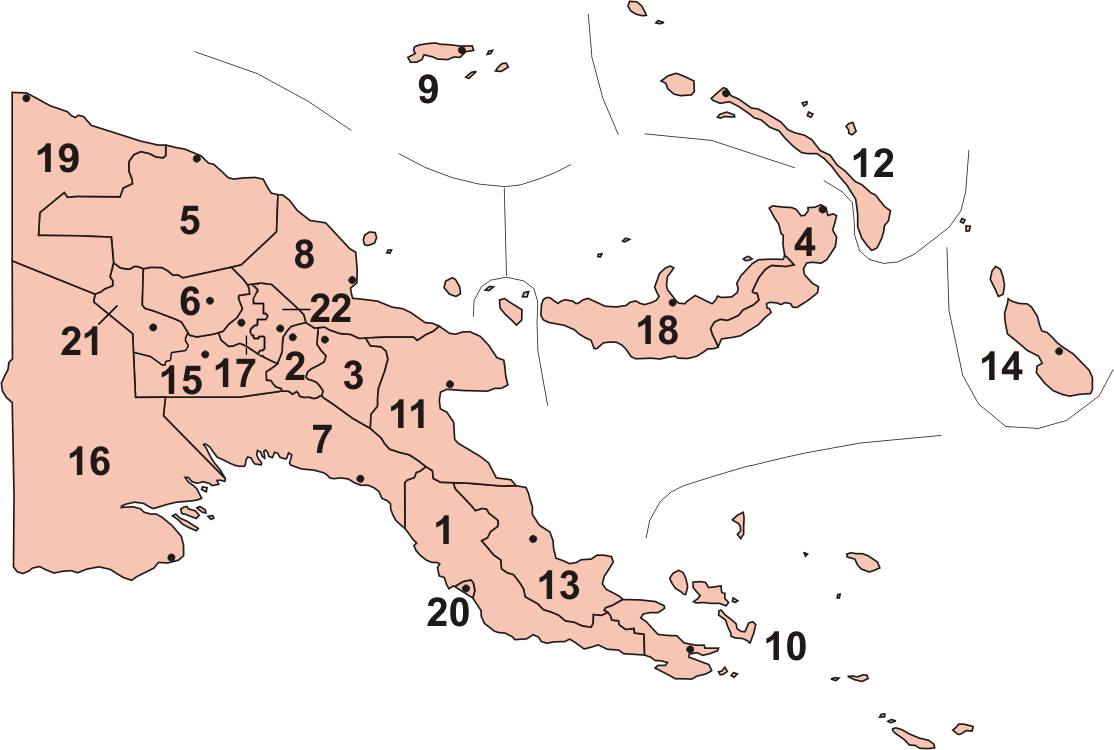
Numbered provinces in Papua New Guinea, referred to in the text

== Sandaun Province ==
(No. 19 on the map)

- Tumleo Island
- Ali Island
- Seleo Island
- Angel Island

== East Sepik Province ==
(No. 5 on the map)

- Schouten Islands, a loose group of islands off the coast of the East Sepik Province
  - Tarawai (Tandanie) Island
  - Walis (Walifu) Island
  - Karesau Island
  - Mushu Island
  - Kairiru Island
  - Yuo Island
  - Rabuin Island
  - Unei Island
  - Wogeo Island
  - Koil Island
  - Wei (or Vial) Island
  - Blupblup Island
  - Kadowar Island
  - Bam Island

== Manus Province ==
(No. 9 on the map)

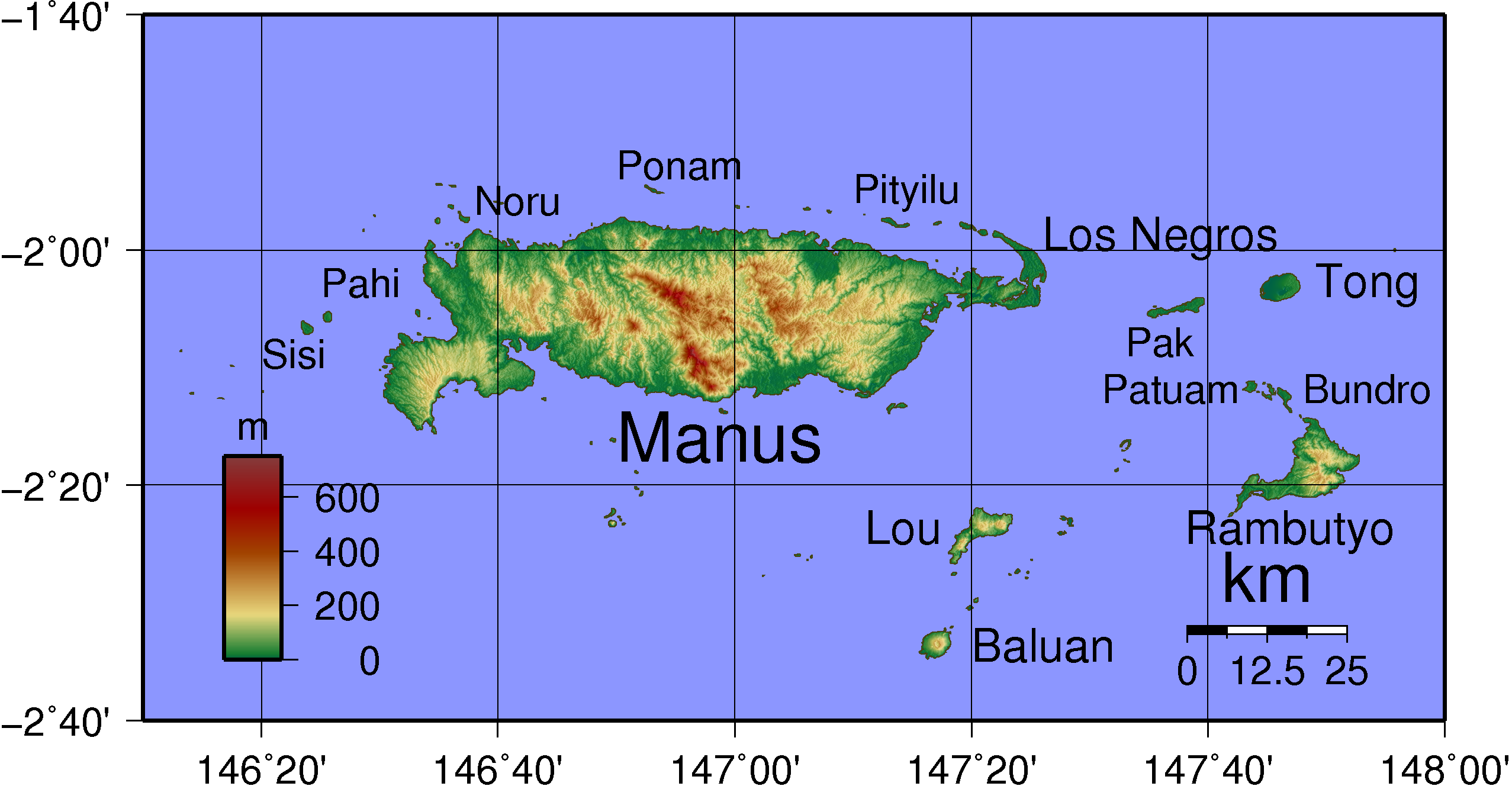
The Admiralty Islands

- Admiralty Islands, group of 18 islands including:
  - Manus Island, main island
  - Bipi Island
  - Los Negros Island
  - Lou Island
  - Ndrova Island
  - Tong Island
  - Baluan Island
  - Pak Island
  - Purdy Islands
  - Rambutyo Island
  - St. Andrews Islands
- Western Islands, with:
  - Aua Island
  - Hermit Islands
  - Kaniet Islands (Anchorite)
    - Sae Island
  - Ninigo Islands
  - Wuvulu Island

== New Ireland Province ==
(No. 12 on the map)

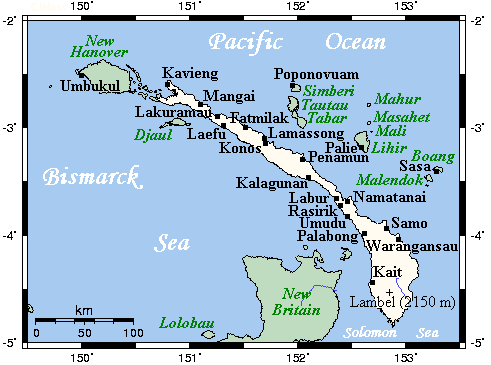
New Ireland Province

- New Ireland
  - Baudisson Island
  - Manne Island
  - Selapiu Island
- New Hanover or Lavongai
- Saint Matthias Group
- Tabar Group
- Lihir Group
- Tanga Group
- Feni Islands
  - Ambitle
  - Babase Island
- Dyaul Island

== West New Britain Province ==
(No. 18 on the map)

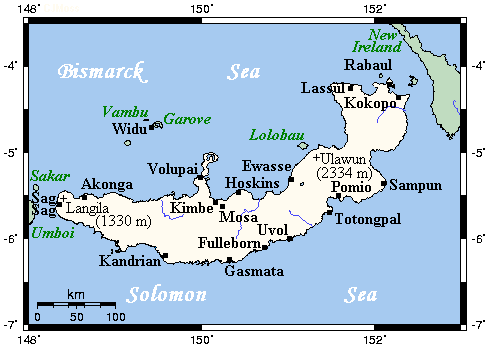
New Britain

- New Britain or also Niu Briten, main island
- Vitu Islands

== East New Britain Province ==
(No. 4 on the map)

- New Britain or also Niu Briten, main island
- Watom Island
- Matupi Island
- Duke of York Islands
  - Duke of York Island
  - Kabakon
  - Kerawara
  - Makada
  - Mioko Island
  - Mualim Island
  - Ulu

== Madang Province ==
(No 8 on the map)

- Long Island
- Crown Island
- Karkar Island
- Bagabag Island
- Manam

== Morobe Province ==
(No. 11 on the map)

- Umboi Island
- Tolokiwa Island
- Sakar Island
- Ritter Island
- Malai Island
- Tuam Island

== Autonomous Region of Bougainville ==
(No. 14 on map)

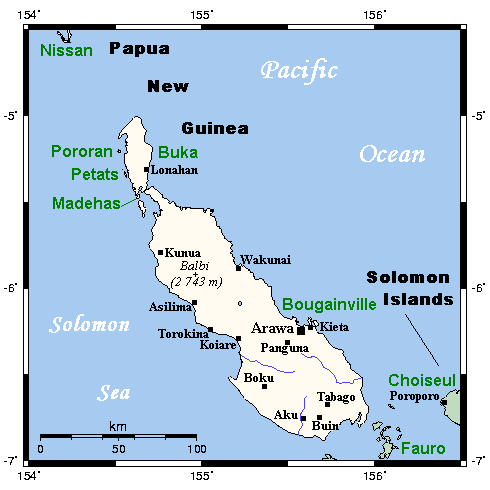
Bougainville

- Bougainville
- Buka Island
- Green Islands
  - Barahun Island
  - Nissan Island
  - Pinipel Island
  - Sirot Island
  - Sau Island

== Western Province ==
(No. 16 on map)

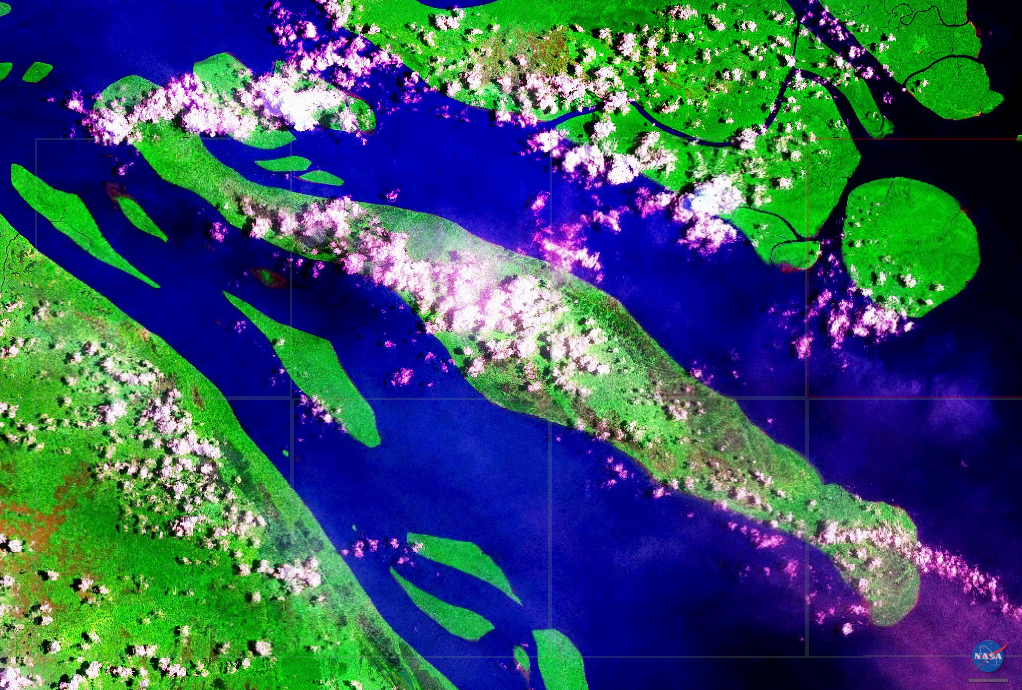
The islands of the Fly River Delta, including Kiwai, Purutu and Wabuda

- Daru Island
- Bristow Island
- Kawai Islands
  - Kawa Island
  - Karobailo Kawa Island
  - Mata Kawa Island
- Parama Island
- Kiwai Island
- Purutu Island
- Wabuda Island

== Gulf Province ==
(No. 7 on map)

- Morigio Island
- Neabo Island
- Goaribari Island
- Urama Island

== National Capital District ==
(No. 20 on map)

- Daugo Island
- Manubada Island
- Haidana Island

• Loloata Islands

== Milne Bay Province ==
(No. 10 on the map)

- South Coast Islands
  - Bona Bona
  - Brumer Islands
    - Baliabedabeda Bonarua
    - Halioya
  - Deirina

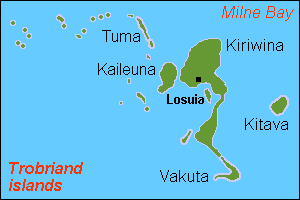
Trobriand Islands

- Trobriand Islands
  - Kiriwina
  - Kaileuna
  - Vakuta
  - Kitava

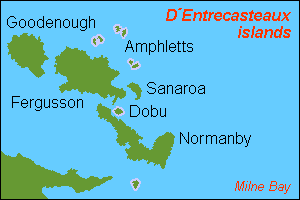
D'Entrecasteaux Islands

- D'Entrecasteaux Islands
  - Fergusson Island
  - Goodenough Island
  - Normanby Island (Papua New Guinea)
  - Sanaroa Island
  - Dobu Island
  - Sori (or Wild) Island

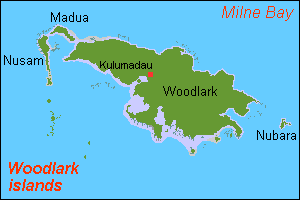
Woodlark Islands

- Woodlark Islands
  - Woodlark Island
  - Madau

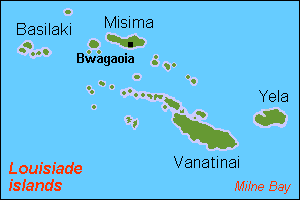
Louisiade Archipelago

- Louisiade Archipelago
  - Samarai Islands
    - Basilaki Island
    - Beika Island
    - Bonarua Hili Hili Island
    - Buiari Island
    - Castori Islets
    - Dagadaga Bonarua Island
    - Deka Deka Island
    - Didigilo Island
    - Dinana Island
    - Doini Island
    - Ebuma Island
    - Gado-Gadoa Island
    - Galahi Island
    - Gesila Island
    - Gonabarabara Island
    - Grant Island
    - Igwali Island
    - Ito Island
    - Kitai Bai Island
    - Kato Katoa Island
    - Kitai Bona Bona Island
    - Kitai Katu Island
    - Kitai Lilivea Island
    - Kui Island
    - Kwai Ama Island
    - Kwato Island
    - Lesimano Island
    - Logea Island
    - Nasariri Island
    - Populai Island
    - Samarai
    - Sariba Island
    - Sideia Island
    - Sripkunui Island
    - Tuyam Island
    - Wasima Island
    - Bentley Islands
      - Anagusa
      - Nare
  - Bonvouloir Islands
    - East Island, Papua New Guinea
    - Strathord Islands
    - Hastings Island (Papua New Guinea)
  - Calvados Chain
    - Panasia
    - Sloss Islands
    - Utian Island
    - Pana Rora Island
    - Pana Udu Udi
    - Gulewa Island
    - Ululina Island
    - Venariwa Island
    - Motorina Island
    - Bonna Wan
    - Bagaman Island
    - Bobo Eina Island
    - Pana Numara
    - Yaruman
    - Panangaribu
    - Panatinane Island
    - Kuwanak Island
    - Gigila
    - Pana Wina Island
    - Hemenahei Island
  - Conflict Group
    - Auriroa Island
    - Gabugabutau Island
    - Ginara Island
    - Irai Island
    - Itamarina Island
    - Lunn Island
    - Moniara Island
    - Panaboal Island
    - Panarakuum Island
    - Panasesa Island
    - Quesal Island
    - Tupit Island
  - Deboyne Islands
    - Losai Island; Nibub Island; Nivani Island
    - Pana Uya Wana; Panaeati; Panapompom
    - Passage Island
    - Rara Island
  - Duchateau Islands
    - Jomard Islands
    - Kukuluba Island
    - Montemont Islands
    - Pana Bobai Ana
    - Pana Rura Wara
  - Dumoulin Islands
    - Ana Karu Karua
    - Baiiri
  - Duperre Islands
    - Duperre Island
    - Punawan
  - East Deboyne Islands
    - Basses Group; Bushy Islets; Mabui Island
    - Pana Sagasagu; Redlick Islets
  - Engineer Islands
    - Bright Island; Butchart Island; Button Island
    - Deedes Island; Flat Island; Good Island; Haszard Island
    - Hummock Island
    - Messum Island; Pender Island; Powell Island
    - Skelton Island; Slade Island; Watts Island
  - Laseinie Islands
    - Dawson Island, Kagawan Island; Keaawan Island
    - Hardman Islands
  - Misima Island
  - Daloloia Group
  - Pana Tinani Islands
    - Nimoa Island
    - Pana Tinani
    - Wanim Island
    - Yeina Island
    - Daddahai Island; Hevaisi Island; Osasai Island; Sibumbum Island
  - Renard Islands
    - Baiwa; Kimuta; Manuga Reef; Oreia
  - Rossel Islands
    - Diama
    - Pocklington Reef
    - Rossel Island
    - Wule Island
  - Torlesse Islands
    - Pananiu Island
    - Tinolan
  - Vanatinai Islands
    - Boboa Island
    - Iyen Island
    - Tagula Island also known as Vanatinai Island and Sudest Island
    - Venama
  - Wari Islands
    - Imbert Island
    - Kosman Reef
    - Lebrun Islands
    - Long Island
    - Quessant Island
    - Sable Island
    - Siga Island
    - Stuers Islands
    - Wari Island
