= Gonabarabara Island =

Island in Papua New Guinea

Gonubalabala Island
Native name: Gonubalabala
- Location within Papua New Guinea

Geography
- Location: Oceania
- Coordinates: 10°41′13″S 150°40′40″E
- Archipelago: Louisiade Archipelago
- Adjacent to: Solomon Sea
- Total islands: 1
- Major islands: Gonubalabala
- Area: 0.24 km^{2} (0.093 sq mi)
- Length: 0.45 km (0.28 mi)
- Width: 0.71 km (0.441 mi)
- Coastline: 2.3 km (1.43 mi)
- Highest elevation: 74.6 ft (22.74 m)
- Highest point: Mount Gonubalabala

Administration
- Papua New Guinea
- Province: Milne Bay
- Island Group: Samarai Islands
- Island Group: Doini Islands
- Ward: Logea South
- Largest settlement: Mailulu clan (pop. 30)

Demographics
- Population: 30 - 75 (2017)
- Pop. density: 0/km^{2} (0/sq mi)
- Ethnic groups: Papuans, Austronesians, Melanesians.

Additional information
- Time zone: AEST (UTC+10)
- ISO code: PG-MBA
- Official website: www.ncdc.gov.pg

Gonubalabala Island (on maps as Gonaarabara) is an island on the southern side of East Channel, Milne Bay Province, Papua New Guinea. It is located southeast of Logea Island and can be reached by local boats in about 2.5 hours from the provincial capital, Alotau. It is a home island of the Mailulu clan and has two guesthouses.

== Administration ==
The island is part of Logea South Ward, Bwanabwana Rural Local Level Government Area LLG, Samarai-Murua District, which are in Milne Bay Province.

== History ==
The island has been home to the Mailulu clan for at least six generations. They have been and remain stewards of the land as well as the reef. For over 100 years they have observed the habits of manta rays, which gather in large numbers just offshore.

== Geography ==
The island is part of the Doini group, itself a part of Samarai Islands of the Louisiade Archipelago.

== Economy ==
In addition to woodworking and guiding divers/snorkelers on the reef and nearby islands, the Mailulu clan offer home stays in private, hand-built bungalows. Reef fees are required for anchoring vessels that people live aboard. Diving and snorkelling are possible year round. The island has a small marine reserve which is a manta ray cleaning station. Manta rays arrive at a large coral bombora to be cleaned of parasites by smaller fish when the underwater current is strong. It is also an important manta ray feeding and aggregation site. According to Nelson Napoleon, Mailulu Clan Elder and Ward Member of the Gonubalabala and Logea Ward, the best times and conditions to see the cleaning are said to be during and just after a full moon; in the months of June to November when there is less rain; and during low tides.
