= Tuyam Island =

Island in Papua New Guinea

Nickname: Blanchard Island
- Location within Papua New Guinea

Geography
- Location: Oceania
- Coordinates: 10°41′55″S 150°42′55″E
- Archipelago: Louisiade Archipelago
- Adjacent to: Solomon Sea
- Total islands: 1
- Major islands: Doini
- Area: 0.16 km^{2} (0.062 sq mi)
- Length: 0.6 km (0.37 mi)
- Width: 0.3 km (0.19 mi)
- Coastline: 1.85 km (1.15 mi)
- Highest elevation: 50 m (160 ft)

Administration
- Papua New Guinea
- Province: Milne Bay
- Island Group: Samarai Islands
- Island Group: Doini Islands
- Ward: Logea South

Demographics
- Population: 0 (2014)
- Pop. density: 0/km^{2} (0/sq mi)
- Ethnic groups: Papauans, Austronesians, Melanesians.

Additional information
- Time zone: AEST (UTC+10)
- ISO code: PG-MBA
- Official website: www.ncdc.gov.pg

Tuyam Island is an island on the southern side of East Channel, Milne Bay Province, Papua New Guinea.

== Administration ==
The island belongs to Logea South Ward, Bwanabwana Rural Local Level Government Area LLG, Samarai-Murua District, which are in Milne Bay Province.

== Geography ==
The island is part of the Doini group, itself a part of Samarai Islands of the Louisiade Archipelago.

== Economy ==
The island is privately owned, belonging to the owner of Doini Island.
