= Kitai Katoa Island =

Island in Papua New Guinea

Nickname: Glenton Island
- Location within Papua New Guinea

Geography
- Location: Oceania
- Coordinates: 10°40′20″S 151°06′19″E
- Archipelago: Louisiade Archipelago
- Adjacent to: Solomon Sea
- Total islands: 1
- Major islands: Kitai Katoa
- Area: 0.55 km^{2} (0.21 sq mi)
- Length: 0.6 km (0.37 mi)
- Width: 1.05 km (0.652 mi)
- Coastline: 1.4 km (0.87 mi)
- Highest elevation: 101 m (331 ft)

Administration
- Papua New Guinea
- Province: Milne Bay
- Island Group: Samarai Islands
- Island Group: Kitai Islands
- Ward: Bedauna Ward
- Largest settlement: Maragum (pop. 17)

Demographics
- Population: 17 (2014)
- Pop. density: 31/km^{2} (80/sq mi)
- Ethnic groups: Papauans, Austronesians, Melanesians.

Additional information
- Time zone: AEST (UTC+10)
- ISO code: PG-MBA
- Official website: www.ncdc.gov.pg

Kitai Katoa Island (also known as Glenton Island) is an island in the Louisiade Archipelago, off the east coast of Basilaki Island, Milne Bay Province, Papua New Guinea.

== Administration ==
The island is part of Bedauna Ward which belongs to Bwanabwana Rural Local Level Government Area LLG, Samarai-Murua District, which are in Milne Bay Province.

== Geography ==
Kitai Katoa is part of the Kitai Islands, itself a part of Samarai Islands of the Louisiade Archipelago. It is located between Kitai Bai Island and the Kitai Lilivea Island.
