= Buiari Island =

Island in the pacific

Native name: Weitoa Island Nickname: O'Neil Island
- Location within Papua New Guinea

Geography
- Location: Oceania
- Coordinates: 10°40′19″S 150°55′55″E
- Archipelago: Louisiade Archipelago
- Adjacent to: Solomon Sea
- Total islands: 1
- Major islands: Buiari
- Area: 3.13 km^{2} (1.21 sq mi)
- Length: 2.4 km (1.49 mi)
- Width: 1.7 km (1.06 mi)
- Coastline: 8.6 km (5.34 mi)
- Highest elevation: 580 ft (177 m)
- Highest point: Mount Buiari

Administration
- Papua New Guinea
- Province: Milne Bay
- Island Group: Samarai Islands
- Island Group: Sideia Islands
- Ward: Buiari Ward
- Largest settlement: Buiari (pop. 400)

Demographics
- Population: 500 (2014)
- Pop. density: 156/km^{2} (404/sq mi)
- Ethnic groups: Papauans, Austronesians, Melanesians.

Additional information
- Time zone: AEST (UTC+10)
- ISO code: PG-MBA
- Official website: www.ncdc.gov.pg

Buiari Island is an island in the Louisiade Archipelago in Milne Bay Province, Papua New Guinea.

== Administration ==
The island is part of Buiari Ward (which also includes some tiny villages on near Basilaki island. The ward belong to Bwanabwana Rural Local Level Government Area LLG, Samarai-Murua District, which are in Milne Bay Province.

== Geography ==
Buiari is located Southwest of Basilaki, and is part of the Basilaki group, itself a part of Samarai Islands of the Louisiade Archipelago.

== Demographics ==
The population of 500 is living in 2 villages across the island. The most important one, and where the dock is located, is Buiari, and is on the north coast facing Basilaki. The smaller one, Numodubo, is in the central plateau

== Economy ==
The islanders, are farmers as opposed to eastern Louisiade Archipelago islanders. they grow Sago, Taro, and Yams for crops.

== Transportation ==
There is a dock at Buiari.
