= Ito Island =

Island in Papua New Guinea

Nickname: Wanepa Island
- Location within Papua New Guinea

Geography
- Location: Oceania
- Coordinates: 10°33′19″S 150°45′55″E
- Archipelago: Louisiade Archipelago
- Adjacent to: Solomon Sea
- Total islands: 1
- Major islands: Itp
- Area: 3.06 km^{2} (1.18 sq mi)
- Length: 1.55 km (0.963 mi)
- Width: 2.35 km (1.46 mi)
- Coastline: 7.80 km (4.847 mi)
- Highest elevation: 134 m (440 ft)

Administration
- Papua New Guinea
- Province: Milne Bay
- Island Group: Samarai Islands
- Island Group: Sariba Islands
- Ward: Sidudu Ward
- Largest settlement: Sabunu Una (pop. 5)

Demographics
- Population: 10 (2014)
- Pop. density: 6.8/km^{2} (17.6/sq mi)
- Ethnic groups: Papauans, Austronesians, Melanesians.

Additional information
- Time zone: AEST (UTC+10)
- ISO code: PG-MBA
- Official website: www.ncdc.gov.pg

Ito Island (also known as Wanepa Island) is an island between Sariba and Sideia, on the eastern side of China Strait, in Milne Bay Province, Papua New Guinea.

== Administration ==
The island is part of Sidudu Ward, which belongs to Bwanabwana Rural Local Level Government Area LLG, Samarai-Murua District, which are in Milne Bay Province.

== Geography ==
The island is part of the Sariba group, itself a part of Samarai Islands of the Louisiade Archipelago.

== Demographics ==
The population of 10 is living in 2 separate hamlets. Sabunu-Una on the west, and Suna on the east.

== Economy ==
The islanders, are farmers as opposed to eastern Louisiade Archipelago islanders. they grow Sago, Taro, and Yams for crops.
