= Doini Island =

Island of Papua New Guinea

Nickname: Blanchard Island
- Location within Papua New Guinea

Geography
- Location: Oceania
- Coordinates: 10°41′55″S 150°42′55″E
- Archipelago: Louisiade Archipelago
- Adjacent to: Solomon Sea
- Total islands: 1
- Major islands: Doini
- Area: 4.07 km^{2} (1.57 sq mi)
- Length: 3.7 km (2.3 mi)
- Width: 2.5 km (1.55 mi)
- Coastline: 10.2 km (6.34 mi)
- Highest elevation: 510 ft (155 m)
- Highest point: Mount Doini

Administration
- Papua New Guinea
- Province: Milne Bay
- Island Group: Samarai Islands
- Island Group: Doini Islands
- Ward: Logea South
- Largest settlement: Doini plantation resort (pop. 30)

Demographics
- Population: 30 (2014)
- Pop. density: 7.37/km^{2} (19.09/sq mi)
- Ethnic groups: Papauans, Austronesians, Melanesians.

Additional information
- Time zone: AEST (UTC+10)
- ISO code: PG-MBA
- Official website: www.ncdc.gov.pg

Doini Island (also called Blanchard Island) is an island on the southern side of East Channel, Milne Bay Province, Papua New Guinea.

== Administration ==
The island belongs to Logea South Ward, Bwanabwana Rural Local Level Government Area LLG, Samarai-Murua District, which are in Milne Bay Province.

== History ==
Doini Island was first sighted by Europeans on 30 July 1606 by the Spanish expedition of Luís Vaez de Torres. They sailed and landed in it coming from their nearby base in Puerto de San Francisco (as they had named Oba Bay in Sideia Island). Upon their approach, although fires had been seen on the island every night, the natives retreated by canoe to another island when the landing crew approached. The thatch houses in the village had interior walls and contained fishing nets, stone axes, and large pearl shells. In the diary kept by José de Prado y Tovar, an aristocratic adventurer who accompanied the expedition, we can read the following about Doini Island:.

The island is well cultivated with plenty of fruit trees, they drink water from a large, well-made cistern as they do not know how to sink wells; we found small dumb dogs that neither bark nor howl, and do not cry out even if beaten with sticks

The island was named San Facundo (St. Facundus). Some natives arriving at the island by canoe were captured, and from them Prado obtained the names of native tribes before setting them at liberty again. The names were the Boniguis, the Hunis and the Canaiis.

On the 31 July, a large party was assembled ashore for the formal act of possession, as Prado reports:

...and before setting out from this harbour I caused all the men of the ship and launch to collect together with their arms in their hands, and having set two sentinels in good posts and the men in the form of a squadron, I took possession of all the land in the following form; having taken off my hat I said, Be my witnesses noble and faithful vassals of the King our lord that I, Don Diego de Prado, his Captain and Commander, do take possession of all this land discovered and to be discovered in the name of the most invincible and Catholic Don Philip the Third our lord, king of the Spains and West and East Indies, and of his predecessors for ever and ever, amen. And they all responded three times in loud voice, heads uncovered, with Long live the King our lord, and I forthwith asked the notary of the ship for an attestation and a royal salvo was fired with the artillery and arequebuses, and in the evening there were illuminations and a Salve Regina was sung, giving thanks to our Lord and to his blessed Mother for the favours received and praying him to grant us a good voyage and every good success in that expedition to his honour and glory, amen.

== Geography ==
The island is part of the Doini group, itself a part of Samarai Islands of the Louisiade Archipelago.

== Economy ==
The island is privately owned and is exploited as a holiday resort. The island is served by an airstrip that was built by the resort.
