= Kitai Katu Island =

Island of the Louisiade Archipelago

Kitai Lilivea Island
Nickname: Haines Island
- Location within Papua New Guinea

Geography
- Location: Oceania
- Coordinates: 10°40′20″S 151°03′40″E
- Archipelago: Louisiade Archipelago
- Adjacent to: Solomon Sea
- Total islands: 1
- Major islands: Kitai Katu
- Area: 0.72 km^{2} (0.28 sq mi)
- Length: 1.3 km (0.81 mi)
- Width: 0.73 km (0.454 mi)
- Coastline: 3.9 km (2.42 mi)
- Highest elevation: 45 m (148 ft)

Administration
- Papua New Guinea
- Province: Milne Bay
- Island Group: Samarai Islands
- Island Group: Kitai Islands
- Ward: Bedauna Ward
- Largest settlement: Kitai Katu (pop. 10)

Demographics
- Population: 10 (2014)
- Pop. density: 14/km^{2} (36/sq mi)
- Ethnic groups: Papuans, Austronesians, Melanesians.

Additional information
- Time zone: AEST (UTC+10)
- ISO code: PG-MBA
- Official website: www.ncdc.gov.pg

Kitai Katu Island (also known as Haines Island) is an island in the Louisiade Archipelago, off the east coast of Basilaki Island, Milne Bay Province, Papua New Guinea.

== Administration ==
The island is part of Bedauna Ward which belongs to Bwanabwana Rural Local Level Government Area LLG, Samarai-Murua District, which are in Milne Bay Province.

== Geography ==
Kitai Katu is part of the Kitai Islands, itself a part of Samarai Islands of the Louisiade Archipelago. It is located between Kitai Lilivea Island and the town of Haliki on Basilaki Island.
