= Gesila Island =

Island in Milne Bay Province, Papua New Guinea

- Location within Papua New Guinea

Geography
- Location: Oceania
- Coordinates: 10°35′19″S 150°38′34″E
- Archipelago: Louisiade Archipelago
- Adjacent to: Solomon Sea
- Total islands: 1
- Major islands: Gesila
- Area: 0.17 km^{2} (0.066 sq mi)
- Length: 0.95 km (0.59 mi)
- Width: 0.2 km (0.12 mi)
- Coastline: 2.2 km (1.37 mi)
- Highest elevation: 61 m (200 ft)
- Highest point: Mount Gesila

Administration
- Papua New Guinea
- Province: Milne Bay
- Island Group: Samarai Islands
- Ward: Kuiaro
- Largest settlement: Gesila (pop. 19)

Demographics
- Population: 19 (2014)
- Pop. density: 111.3/km^{2} (288.3/sq mi)
- Ethnic groups: Papauans, Austronesians, Melanesians.

Additional information
- Time zone: AEST (UTC+10)
- ISO code: PG-MBA
- Official website: www.ncdc.gov.pg

Gesila Island is a small island separating West Channel, East Channel and China Strait, just south of Milne Bay, in Milne Bay Province, Papua New Guinea.

== Administration ==
The island belongs to Kuiaro, of Bwanabwana Rural Local Level Government Area LLG, Samarai-Murua District, which are in Milne Bay Province.

== History ==
The island is owned by the Seventh-day Adventist church. From 1961 until the 1980s it was the site of the Adventist mission headquarters for the Milne Bay area (which is now administered from Popondetta).

== Geography ==
The island is part of Samarai Islands of the Louisiade Archipelago.

== Demographics ==
The population of 19 is located on a single village on the northwest point.

== Economy ==
The islanders, are farmers. They are also paid for taking care of the old church building.

== Transportation ==
There is a dock in the village.
