= Lesimano Island =

Island in Papua New Guinea

Nickname: Brewer Island
- Location within Papua New Guinea

Geography
- Location: Oceania
- Coordinates: 10°34′19″S 150°42′55″E
- Archipelago: Louisiade Archipelago
- Adjacent to: Solomon Sea
- Total islands: 1
- Major islands: Lesimano
- Area: 0.21 km^{2} (0.081 sq mi)
- Length: 0.45 km (0.28 mi)
- Width: 0.6 km (0.37 mi)
- Coastline: 1.71 km (1.063 mi)
- Highest elevation: 37 m (121 ft)

Administration
- Papua New Guinea
- Province: Milne Bay
- Island Group: Samarai Islands
- Island Group: Sariba Islands
- Ward: Sidudu Ward
- Largest settlement: Lesimano

Demographics
- Population: 0 (2014)
- Pop. density: 0/km^{2} (0/sq mi)
- Ethnic groups: Papuans, Austronesians, Melanesians.

Additional information
- Time zone: AEST (UTC+10)
- ISO code: PG-MBA
- Official website: web.archive.org/web/*/http://www.oceandots.com/pacific/png/laseinie.php

Lesimano Island (also called Brewer Island) is an island off the north coast of Sariba, in Milne Bay Province, Papua New Guinea.

== Administration ==
The island belongs to Sidudu Ward of Bwanabwana Rural Local Level Government Area LLG, Samarai-Murua District, which are in Milne Bay Province.

== Geography ==
The island is part of the Sariba group, itself a part of Samarai Islands of the Louisiade Archipelago.

== Demographics ==
The island was previously inhabited.
