= Kui Island =

Island in Papua New Guinea

Nickname: Mekinley Island
- Location within Papua New Guinea

Geography
- Location: Oceania
- Coordinates: 10°33′19″S 150°43′55″E
- Archipelago: Louisiade Archipelago
- Adjacent to: Solomon Sea
- Total islands: 1
- Major islands: Kui
- Area: 0.19 km^{2} (0.073 sq mi)
- Length: 0.36 km (0.224 mi)
- Width: 0.61 km (0.379 mi)
- Coastline: 1.64 km (1.019 mi)
- Highest elevation: 35 m (115 ft)

Administration
- Papua New Guinea
- Province: Milne Bay
- Island Group: Samarai Islands
- Island Group: Sariba Islands
- Ward: Sidudu Ward
- Largest settlement: Kui (pop. 5)

Demographics
- Population: 5 (2014)
- Pop. density: 26/km^{2} (67/sq mi)
- Ethnic groups: Papuans, Austronesians, Melanesians.

Additional information
- Time zone: AEST (UTC+10)
- ISO code: PG-MBA
- Official website: www.ncdc.gov.pg

Mekinley Island (also known as Kui Island) is an island north of Sariba Island, and on the eastern side of China Strait, in Milne Bay Province, Papua New Guinea.

== Administration ==
The island is part of Sidudu Ward, which belongs to Bwanabwana Rural Local Level Government Area LLG, Samarai-Murua District, which are in Milne Bay Province.

== Geography ==
The island is part of the Sariba group, itself a part of Samarai Islands of the Louisiade Archipelago. It is located 10 meters from South Kui Island

== Demographics ==
The population of 5 people is living in the northern coast.

== Economy ==
The islanders, are farmers as opposed to eastern Louisiade Archipelago islanders. they grow Sago, Taro, and Yams for crops.
