= Ebuma Island =

Small island of Papua New Guinea

- Location within Papua New Guinea

Geography
- Location: Oceania
- Coordinates: 10°36′19″S 150°39′55″E
- Archipelago: Louisiade Archipelago
- Adjacent to: Solomon Sea
- Total islands: 1
- Major islands: Ebuma
- Area: 0.022 km^{2} (0.0085 sq mi)
- Length: 0.17 km (0.106 mi)
- Width: 0.18 km (0.112 mi)
- Coastline: 0.55 km (0.342 mi)
- Highest elevation: 22 m (72 ft)

Administration
- Papua New Guinea
- Province: Milne Bay
- Island Group: Samarai Islands
- Ward: Samarai North
- Largest settlement: Ebuma (pop. 1)

Demographics
- Population: 1 (2014)
- Pop. density: 46/km^{2} (119/sq mi)
- Ethnic groups: Papauans, Austronesians, Melanesians.

Additional information
- Time zone: AEST (UTC+10)
- ISO code: PG-MBA
- Official website: www.ncdc.gov.pg

Ebuma Island is a small island in China Strait, between Samarai and the mainland, Milne Bay Province, Papua New Guinea.

== History ==
George and Edna-May Hancock purchased the island in 1960, they built a house on it and lived there from 1960 - 1985. Ernie Evennett married Lynne Hancock and George Hancock, Lynne’s father built a second house on the island in 1962 for them, Ernie Evennett was allowed to live on Ebuma long after because of his relationship to their daughter. Today his son is the only one living there.

== Geography ==
Ebuma Island is a rocky raised islet, with low cliffs on most sides. Privately owned. The island is part of Samarai Islands of the Louisiade Archipelago.

== Administration ==
The island belongs to Samarai North Ward. belong to Bwanabwana Rural Local Level Government Area LLG, Samarai-Murua District, which are in Milne Bay Province.

== Demographics ==
The population on the last census was 1.
