= Dinana Island =

Uninhabited island in Papua New Guinea

Nickname: Carry Island
- Location within Papua New Guinea

Geography
- Location: Oceania
- Coordinates: 10°35′19″S 150°52′55″E
- Archipelago: Louisiade Archipelago
- Adjacent to: Solomon Sea
- Total islands: 1
- Major islands: Dinana
- Area: 0.9 km^{2} (0.35 sq mi)
- Length: 1.5 km (0.93 mi)
- Width: 0.9 km (0.56 mi)
- Coastline: 4.8 km (2.98 mi)

Administration
- Papua New Guinea
- Province: Milne Bay
- Island Group: Samarai Islands
- Island Group: Sideia Islands
- Ward: Sekuku

Demographics
- Population: 0 (2014)
- Pop. density: 0/km^{2} (0/sq mi)
- Ethnic groups: Papuans, Austronesians, Melanesians.

Additional information
- Time zone: AEST (UTC+10)
- ISO code: PG-MBA
- Official website: www.ncdc.gov.pg

Dinana Island is an island in the Louisiade Archipelago in Milne Bay Province, Papua New Guinea.

== Administration ==
The island is part of Sekuku Ward. it belongs to Bwanabwana Rural Local Level Government Area LLG, Samarai-Murua District, which are in Milne Bay Province.

== Geography ==
Dinana is located between Sideia Island and Basilaki Island. The island is part of the Sideia group, itself a part of Samarai Islands of the Louisiade Archipelago.
