= Dagadaga Bonarua Island =

- Location within Papua New Guinea

Geography
- Location: Oceania
- Coordinates: 10°35′44″S 150°41′00″E
- Archipelago: Louisiade Archipelago
- Adjacent to: Solomon Sea
- Total islands: 1
- Major islands: Dagadaga Bonarua
- Area: 0.07 km^{2} (0.027 sq mi)
- Length: 0.65 km (0.404 mi)
- Width: 0.15 km (0.093 mi)
- Coastline: 1.5 km (0.93 mi)
- Highest elevation: 24 m (79 ft)

Administration
- Papua New Guinea
- Province: Milne Bay
- Island Group: Samarai Islands
- Island Group: Sariba Islands
- Ward: Sidudu
- Largest settlement: Dagadaga Bonarua Pearl Farm (abandoned)

Demographics
- Population: 0 (2014)
- Pop. density: 0/km^{2} (0/sq mi)
- Ethnic groups: Papauans, Austronesians, Melanesians.

Additional information
- Time zone: AEST (UTC+10)
- ISO code: PG-MBA
- Official website: www.ncdc.gov.pg

Dagadaga Bonarua Island is an island separating East Channel and China Strait, just south of Milne Bay, in Milne Bay Province, Papua New Guinea.

== Administration ==
The island belongs to Sidudu Ward on Sariba Island. which belong to Bwanabwana Rural Local Level Government Area LLG, Samarai-Murua District, which are in Milne Bay Province.

== History ==
In 1966, a South sea pearl farm established on the island. however, due to financial difficulties, it was closed in 1999.

== Geography ==
The island is part of the Sariba group, itself a part of Samarai Islands of the Louisiade Archipelago.

== Demographics ==
After the pearl farm was closed, a caretaker lived on the island until he died in 2002. Since, the island is abandoned.
