= Kitai Bai Island =

Island in Papua New Guinea

Native name: Babagarai Island Nickname: Nasakuba Island
- Location within Papua New Guinea

Geography
- Location: Oceania
- Coordinates: 10°40′13″S 151°07′19″E
- Archipelago: Louisiade Archipelago
- Adjacent to: Solomon Sea
- Total islands: 1
- Major islands: Kitai Bai
- Area: 0.11 km^{2} (0.042 sq mi)
- Length: 0.6 km (0.37 mi)
- Width: 0.2 km (0.12 mi)
- Coastline: 1.4 km (0.87 mi)
- Highest elevation: 10 m (30 ft)

Administration
- Papua New Guinea
- Province: Milne Bay
- Island Group: Samarai Islands
- Island Group: Kitai Islands
- Ward: Bedauna Ward

Demographics
- Population: 0 (2014)
- Pop. density: 0/km^{2} (0/sq mi)
- Ethnic groups: Papauans, Austronesians, Melanesians.

Additional information
- Time zone: AEST (UTC+10)
- ISO code: PG-MBA
- Official website: www.ncdc.gov.pg

Kitai Bai Island (also known as Babagarai Island) is an islet in the Louisiade Archipelago, off the east coast of Basilaki Island, Milne Bay Province, Papua New Guinea.

== Administration ==
The island is part of Bedauna Ward which belongs to Bwanabwana Rural Local Level Government Area LLG, Samarai-Murua District, which are in Milne Bay Province.

== Geography ==
Kitai Bai is part of the Kitai Islands, itself a part of Samarai Islands of the Louisiade Archipelago. It is located between Kitai Katoa Island and the Engineer Group.
