= Galahi Island =

Papuan island

Nickname: Head Island
- Location within Papua New Guinea

Geography
- Location: Oceania
- Coordinates: 10°38′19″S 150°38′55″E
- Archipelago: Louisiade Archipelago
- Adjacent to: Solomon Sea
- Total islands: 1
- Major islands: Galahi
- Area: 0.92 km^{2} (0.36 sq mi)
- Length: 1.5 km (0.93 mi)
- Width: 0.9 km (0.56 mi)
- Coastline: 4.1 km (2.55 mi)
- Highest elevation: 80 m (260 ft)

Administration
- Papua New Guinea
- Province: Milne Bay
- Island Group: Samarai Islands
- Island Group: Sariba Islands
- Ward: Sauasauaga Ward
- Largest settlement: Galahi (pop. 20)

Demographics
- Population: 20 (2014)
- Pop. density: 22/km^{2} (57/sq mi)
- Ethnic groups: Papauans, Austronesians, Melanesians.

Additional information
- Time zone: AEST (UTC+10)
- ISO code: PG-MBA
- Official website: www.ncdc.gov.pg

Galahi Island (also called Head Island) is an island off the northeast coast of Sariba, in Milne Bay Province, Papua New Guinea.

== Administration ==
The island belongs to Sauasauaga Ward of Bwanabwana Rural Local Level Government Area LLG, Samarai-Murua District, which are in Milne Bay Province.

== Geography ==
The island is part of the Sariba group, itself a part of Samarai Islands of the Louisiade Archipelago.

== Demographics ==
The population of 20 is located on the village on the north coast.

== Economy ==
The islanders, are farmers as opposed to eastern Louisiade Archipelago islanders. they grow Sago, Taro, and Yams for crops.

== Transportation ==
The villagers have a slipway on the island.
