= Populai Island =

Island in Papua New Guinea

Nickname: Margaret Island
- Location within Papua New Guinea

Geography
- Location: Oceania
- Coordinates: 10°35′19″S 150°52′55″E
- Archipelago: Louisiade Archipelago
- Adjacent to: Solomon Sea
- Total islands: 1
- Major islands: Populai
- Area: 1.71 km^{2} (0.66 sq mi)
- Length: 2.35 km (1.46 mi)
- Width: 1 km (0.6 mi)
- Coastline: 7 km (4.3 mi)
- Highest elevation: 106 m (348 ft)

Administration
- Papua New Guinea
- Province: Milne Bay
- Island Group: Samarai Islands
- Island Group: Sideia Islands
- Ward: Gotai
- Largest settlement: Populai (pop. 15)

Demographics
- Population: 15 (2014)
- Pop. density: 8.8/km^{2} (22.8/sq mi)
- Ethnic groups: Papuans, Austronesians, Melanesians.

Additional information
- Time zone: AEST (UTC+10)
- ISO code: PG-MBA
- Official website: www.ncdc.gov.pg

Populai Island (also known as Margaret Island) is an island in the Louisiade Archipelago in Milne Bay Province, Papua New Guinea.

== Administration ==
The island is part of Gotai Ward. it belongs to Bwanabwana Rural Local Level Government Area LLG, Samarai-Murua District, which are in Milne Bay Province.

== Geography ==
Populai is located Southeast of Sideia Island. The island is part of the Sideia group, itself a part of Samarai Islands of the Louisiade Archipelago.

== Demographics ==
The population of 15 is living in 1 village on the north coast.
