= Kwato Island =

Island in Milne Bay Province, Papua New Guinea

- Location within Papua New Guinea

Geography
- Location: Oceania
- Coordinates: 10°36′19″S 150°37′55″E
- Archipelago: Louisiade Archipelago
- Adjacent to: Solomon Sea
- Total islands: 1
- Major islands: Kwato
- Area: 0.35 km^{2} (0.14 sq mi)
- Length: 1 km (0.6 mi)
- Width: 0.85 km (0.528 mi)
- Coastline: 3 km (1.9 mi)
- Highest elevation: 10 ft (3 m)

Administration
- Papua New Guinea
- Province: Milne Bay
- Island Group: Samarai Islands
- Island Group: Logea Islands
- Ward: Logea North
- Largest settlement: Kwato (pop. 50)

Demographics
- Population: 66 (2014)
- Pop. density: 189/km^{2} (490/sq mi)
- Ethnic groups: Papuans, Austronesians, Melanesians.

Additional information
- Time zone: AEST (UTC+10)
- ISO code: PG-MBA
- Official website: www.ncdc.gov.pg

Kwato Island an island in China Strait, Milne Bay Province, Papua New Guinea. It is part of the Louisiade Archipelago. The island covers just 70 acres (28 ha).

== Administration ==
The island belongs to Logea North Ward, which is part of the Bwanabwana Rural Local Level Government Area LLG, Samarai-Murua District in Milne Bay Province.

== History ==
In 1891, Rev Charles Abel and his wife Beatrice and another missionary, F. W. Walker, started a London Missionary Society mission on the island, which was at the time uninhabited but had previously been used by Chinese and European traders. The tombs of Abel and his wife are on the island, behind the church. They developed Kwato into a self-supporting mission with a boarding school, teaching boat-building, agriculture and management skills to the boys and sewing and lace work for the girls, as well as reading, writing and arithmetic and Bible study for all. A saw mill and a machine room were constructed for boat building.

== Geography ==
The island is part of the Logea group, itself a part of Samarai Islands of the Louisiade Archipelago. It is about two miles long and one mile wide and has a boomerang shape. The church built by the missionaries is in the centre of the island at its highest point.

== Economy ==
The islanders, like other from Samarai Islands, are experts in boat building.

== Demographics ==
The present population of around 50 is now split between two villages: Kwato missionary which is inland, and Isuhina which is on the coast. Kwato serves as a meeting place for the surrounding islands, which have around one thousand people.

== Sport ==
The London Missionary Society introduced cricket to Kwato island. It became very popular, and in a short time many of the neighbouring islands started to play the game. It is still very popular in Milne Bay and in other parts of PNG. Kwato still has a cricket ground.

== Transportation ==
There is a dock on the island.
