= Daloloia Group =

Islands of Papua New Guinea

- Location within Papua New Guinea

Geography
- Location: Oceania
- Coordinates: 10°34′00″S 151°52′32″E
- Archipelago: Louisiade Archipelago
- Adjacent to: Solomon Sea
- Total islands: 2
- Major islands: Bonura Island; Sarupai Island
- Area: 0.05 sq mi (0.13 km^{2})
- Highest elevation: 5 m (16 ft)

Administration
- Papua New Guinea
- Province: Milne Bay
- District: Samarai-Murua District
- LLG: Bwanabwana Rural Local Level Government Area
- Island Group: Daloloia Group

Demographics
- Population: 0 (2014)
- Pop. density: 0/sq mi (0/km^{2})
- Ethnic groups: Papauans, Austronesians, Melanesians.

Additional information
- Time zone: AEST (UTC+10)
- ISO code: PG-MBA
- Official website: web.archive.org/web/*/http://www.oceandots.com/pacific/png/laseinie.php

Daloloia Group are islands of Papua New Guinea. They are in the Louisiade Archipelago. They Include Bonura Island and Sarupai Island. The islands have a total area of 0.13 km^{2} (0.05 sq mi)
