= Deka Deka Island =

Uninhabited island in Papua New Guinea

- Location within Papua New Guinea

Geography
- Location: Oceania
- Coordinates: 10°38′19″S 150°38′55″E
- Archipelago: Louisiade Archipelago
- Adjacent to: Solomon Sea
- Total islands: 1
- Major islands: Deka Deka
- Area: 0.04 km^{2} (0.015 sq mi)
- Length: 0.3 km (0.19 mi)
- Width: 0.2 km (0.12 mi)
- Coastline: 1 km (0.6 mi)
- Highest elevation: 10 ft (3 m)

Administration
- Papua New Guinea
- Province: Milne Bay
- Island Group: Samarai Islands
- Island Group: Logea Islands
- Ward: Logea South

Demographics
- Population: 0 (2014)
- Pop. density: 0/km^{2} (0/sq mi)
- Ethnic groups: Papuans, Austronesians, Melanesians.

Additional information
- Time zone: AEST (UTC+10)
- ISO code: PG-MBA
- Official website: web.archive.org/web/20101223043232/http://oceandots.com/pacific/png/deboyne.php

Deka Deka Island is a small island off the SE end of Logea Island, in East Channel, Milne Bay Province, Papua New Guinea.

== Administration ==
The island belonged to Logea South Ward, which belongs to Bwanabwana Rural Local Level Government Area LLG, Samarai-Murua District, which are in Milne Bay Province.

== Geography ==
The island is part of the Logea group, itself a part of Samarai Islands of the Louisiade Archipelago.
