= Brumer Islands =

Papua New Guinea island group

- Location within Papua New Guinea

Geography
- Location: Oceania
- Coordinates: 10°45′30″S 150°23′00″E
- Adjacent to: Coral Sea
- Total islands: 5
- Major islands: Baliabedabeda Bonarua; Halioya
- Area: 4.1 km^{2} (1.6 sq mi)

Administration
- Papua New Guinea
- Province: Milne Bay
- District: Alotau District
- LLG: Suau Rural LLG
- Island Group: Brumer Islands
- Largest settlement: Badila Bedda Bedda Bonarua (pop. ~160)

Demographics
- Population: 160 (2000)
- Ethnic groups: Papuans, Austronesians, Melanesians.

Additional information
- Time zone: AEST (UTC+10)
- ISO code: PG-MBA
- Official website: www.ncdc.gov.pg

Brumer Islands are an island group of Papua New Guinea. The islands are located off the southeast coast of New Guinea, about 10 km from the South Cape. The islands belong to Suau Rural LLG, and are not related to Louisiade Archipelago.

Badila Bedda Bedda Bonarua (2,49 km^{2}), is the westernmost island of the group. it is long and narrow, and extends over 4 km from northeast to southwest. It is dense with coconut forests and other trees. The soil is fertile. In the valleys, many fenced fields of the farmers who raise bananas and sugar cane can be seen. At its highest point, Mount Bonarua, it reaches 120 m. There is a light beacon on the southwest cape of the island.

Harikoia, the second largest island (1,32 km^{2}) is located east of Badila Bedda Bedda Bonarua, it is higher and reaches 165 m. The other islands of the group, including Ahana rock, are all located southeast of Harikoia.

== Population ==
At the time of the 2000 census the population of the group was 160, all in the only village on the main island Bonarua.

== History ==
First recorded sighting by Europeans was by the Spanish expedition of Luís Vaez de Torres in the summer of 1606, that charted it as Mira Como Vas (Look How You're Going in Spanish).
