= Charles Abel (missionary) =

British missionary (1863–1930)

- Missionary to the Territory of Papua
- Born: 25 September 1863; Bloomsbury, London, England
- Died: 10 April 1930 (aged 66); England
- Occupation: Missionary
- Known for: Establishing the Kwato mission in Papua
- Spouse: Beatrice Moxon (1869–1939)
- Children: Phyllis, Cecil, Russell and Marjorie

Charles William Abel (23 September 1863 – 10 April 1930) was a Congregationalist who founded the Kwato mission in the Territory of Papua, in what is now the Milne Bay Province of Papua New Guinea (PNG). He was the father of Sir Cecil Abel who played an important role in PNG at the time of its independence, and great-grandfather of Charles Abel, a government minister in PNG.

== Early life ==
Charles William Abel was born on 25 September 1863 in Bloomsbury, London but his family later moved to Wandsworth in London. His father, William Abel, was a Congregationalist and worked for Mudie's Lending Library. Abel had two elder brothers and two sisters. At the age of 11 he went with his mother to the Islington Agricultural Hall to hear the American evangelists, Dwight L. Moody and Ira D. Sankey, and was very much affected by their message. At the age of 14, he joined his father in working at Mudie's Library. He and his brother, Robert, considered migrating to America, but had been discouraged by letters from other young men from their area who had failed to find opportunities in the US. Instead, Charles applied for an agricultural cadetship at the London office of a New Zealand firm, and sailed for New Zealand in late 1881. However, he was not very happy in his work and at some stage chose to join Māori gum workers in the Kauri forests north of Auckland. There he gave scripture lessons to young Maori boys and helped them to trade with Europeans.

== Early life as a missionary ==
Having decided to become a missionary, Abel returned to England and entered Cheshunt College in Hertfordshire, a theological college that trained missionaries and would later become part of Westminster College, Cambridge. In addition to theology, he obtained an elementary knowledge of ethnology. He took some medical lessons in London. He would sometimes go to hear the evangelist, Charles Spurgeon, speak in London. Spurgeon was skilled in oratory; an ability Abel also became known for. Abel was also a good cricketer and played county cricket for Hertfordshire.

In 1889 Abel applied to the London Missionary Society (LMS) to become a missionary and was ordained in 1890. He had heard about New Guinea from his friend William McFarlane, son of Samuel McFarlane, a pioneer missionary in New Guinea and the two asked James Chalmers of the LMS mission in Port Moresby to arrange for them to be appointed to New Guinea. In 1889, Abel was ordained as a Congregational minister and appointed to the New Guinea Mission.

Abel arrived in Port Moresby in October 1890 and briefly relieved James Chalmers at the mission. In August 1891 he joined another missionary, F. W. Walker, at Kwato Island, on the southeast tip of New Guinea in what is now Milne Bay Province. The 70 acres (28 ha) island had previously been used by Chinese and European traders, but was uninhabited by 1890. The LMS owned the freehold. Initially, he spent some time conducting an anthropological study of the people on Logea Island (also spelled Rogeia), immediately to the south of Kwato. In 1891, Abel went to Sydney and on 22 November 1891 married Elizabeth Beatrice Emma Moxon, who he had met aboard ship, returning with her to Kwato.

At the mission, the couple began teaching elementary subjects and Bible-study, as well as carpentry, saw-milling and boat building for the boys, and sewing and lace work for girls, while Walker spent much of his time sailing around the islands to supervise local missionary teachers. The Abels enforced strict rules of sexual segregation, unless the couple chose to marry. They introduced sport, particularly cricket and association football. When Kwato later began to play cricket against other teams, particularly Samarai, the "classic formality of English cricket", with white clothing, pads, caps and a scoreboard was imitated exactly.

Walker fell out with the directors of the LMS and resigned in 1896. After that, the closest missionaries to the Abels were about 100 km to the west at Lawes College, a teacher-training college for local missionaries named after William George Lawes. Under the Abels, local children were separated from their parents as infants. They worked in the mission at the trades they had learnt, and their products were sold to the nearby trading centre of Samarai. Adults who had converted also worked for the mission and became lay evangelists. Although the system of putting children and adults to work was approved by the LMS, it was subject to some criticism by other missionaries and some of the lay preachers. In 1895, Abel and his wife began building a large house, with LMS funding, considered by some to be too ostentatious for a missionary.

When Abel took leave in England in 1900, he gave a series of popular lectures. These were supplemented by a small pamphlet, Kwato, New Guinea, 1890-1900, which gave further details. He was asked to write a children's gift book to be presented by LMS. Savage Life in New Guinea was published at the end of 1901. In it, he argued that some Melanesian customs were doomed to decay and others would have to be replaced. He deplored many of the customs of the Papuans, although he respected their practical skills such as canoe building. But he feared that they might be overwhelmed by European "civilization". Indeed, he became increasingly concerned for the future of the indigenous population under the Australian administration, considering that they might experience the same fate of being overwhelmed as the Maoris in New Zealand or the aboriginal Australians. To address this, he believed it important that the Papuans became economically self-sufficient.

== Relations with other Europeans and Australians ==
From 1901, he became widely known for championing the rights of Papuans in court cases against Europeans and Abel experienced increasing conflict with some Australian residents in the Milne Bay area. His disclosures of various scandals in 1901 made him unpopular amongst the traders in Samarai but earned him the trust of Papuans. Conflict arose from a court action for rape against an Australian in 1902, in which a Kwato mission teacher gave evidence for the prosecution. In the following year, following the murder of a white storekeeper, Abel claimed there had been a miscarriage of justice. He further alleged that a group of armed traders led by a government officer had shot several Milne Bay villagers and burned 38 houses. Noting the decline in the population of the Milne Bay area, he also became an opponent of the practice of blackbirding, a form of slavery in which islanders would be kidnapped and taken to work in Queensland and elsewhere. He also warned local people to avoid "selling" their land and advised them how to oppose expropriation.

Through the Australian prime minister Alfred Deakin, he met Atlee Hunt, Secretary of the Department of External Affairs, who encouraged him to continue reporting on affairs in Papua. When the acting administrator of the Territory of Papua, Judge Christopher Robinson, committed suicide after a royal commission into events on Goaribari Island, many Europeans felt that Abel had driven Robinson to his death with an anonymous attack on him in a Sydney newspaper. Robinson had led a reprisal mission to Goaribari after the islanders had killed Chalmers and another missionary, Oliver Tomkins, as well as ten trainee missionaries.

== Business activities ==
During his 1909 furlough visit to England, Abel persuaded the directors to let him plant coconuts. This was intended to provide work for Papuans on plantations managed by Abel's converts. 500 acres (200 ha) were planted within two years, with financing from people in Sydney. The main purpose of this was to protect the land of the people in Milne Bay from being taken over by Australians. However, other missionaries objected, so Abel agreed to sell the plantations at cost to the LMS. It soon became clear that the society could not afford to maintain the properties and a deputation, sent out in 1915–16 to investigate, recommended the sale of all but 100 acres (40 ha) for each mission and also recommended the reduction in the number of children per mission to 50. Abel would not accept this, and in 1917 sailed to London to confer with the directors. In early 1918, Abel left the LMS, taking the 560 members of the Milne Bay church with him to form the Kwato Extension Association (KEA). The Association would lease its land in Milne Bay from the LMS. Abel would remain nominally an LMS missionary but his salary ceased. He persuaded the society to convert the Kwato Extension Association into a company.

== Reliance on American funding ==
In 1921, Abel and his family went to England, leaving Kwato in the charge of Madge Parkin (1865-1939), his wife's cousin, who had been working there since 1896. The main purpose of the visit was to look for capital but three years after the end of World War I was not the best time for this purpose. He accepted an invitation from the evangelist W. L. Moody to tour the US. There he found financial supporters, who were organized as the New Guinea Evangelization Society. This society paid for the education of his four children, who had all decided to become missionaries, and sent him back to Kwato in 1924 with enough funds to continue and with the promise of building a hospital. The arrangement annoyed the LMS considerably and there were six years of negotiations before the LMS agreed to sell Kwato to the Evangelization Society.

== Personal life ==
In 1891, Abel went to Sydney and on 22 November 1891 married Elizabeth Beatrice Emma Moxon (1869–1939), known as Beatrice, the daughter of a wealthy Anglican family who he had met aboard ship, returning with her to Kwato. Abel and his wife had four children, Phyllis, Cecil, Russell and Marjorie. With the American funds, they were trained at Cambridge University and the University of London to take over at Kwato. In fact, a high proportion of the money from America was spent on the children's education. During his lifetime, Abel had very little influence on Papua outside of the Kwato mission and it was only when his son, Sir Cecil Abel, took over the mission that missionaries from Kwato began to venture westwards along the coast. Cecil eventually moved to Port Moresby, where he became close to some of Papua New Guinea's early leaders, such as the country's first prime minister, Michael Somare, and was credited with writing the preamble to the Papua New Guinea constitution. Charles Abel's great-grandson, also called Charles Abel, is a PNG politician who has served as deputy prime minister and as minister for finance and rural development.

Abel travelled to America and England in 1929–30 to settle matters regarding the sale of Kwato by the LMS, but died after a motor accident in England on 10 April 1930. His ashes were returned to Kwato. In 1964 the Kwato mission rejoined the LMS.

== Bibliography ==
- Mary K. Abel. Charles W. Abel : Papuan pioneer. Zondervan. 1957.
- Russell William Abel. Charles W. Abel of Kwato; forty years in dark Papua. Fleming H. Revell Company. 1934.
- David Wetherell. Charles Abel: and the Kwato Mission of Papua New Guinea, 1891-1975. Melbourne University Press. 1996
