= Cecil Abel =

Papua New Guinea missionary and politician (1903–1994)

- Born: 1 February 1903; Kwato Island, Territory of Papua (present-day Kwato Island, Milne Bay Province, Papua New Guinea)
- Died: 25 June 1994 (aged 91); Brisbane, Australia
- Citizenship: United Kingdom
- Occupations: Missionary and teacher
- Known for: Role in Papua New Guinean independence
- Spouse: Semi Bwagagaia ( –1989)
- Children: Two adopted daughters and one adopted son

Sir Cecil Abel KBE OBE (1903 – 1994) was a missionary, teacher and politician, initially in the Territory of Papua and, from 1975, in the independent nation of Papua New Guinea (PNG). He played an important role in the independence process and is said to have been responsible for the preamble to PNG's constitution. He also played a leading role in the early stages of the Pangu Party, the party that formed the government under prime minister Michael Somare after independence.

== Early life ==
Cecil Charles Geoffrey Abel was born to British parents on 1 February 1903 at Kwato mission, in what is now the Milne Bay Province of PNG, on the eastern tip of New Guinea. He was one of four children of the missionary Charles Abel and Beatrice Abel (née Moxon), who had settled in Kwato in 1890–91. He was initially taught by his mother and, in 1918, was sent to the Sydney Church of England Grammar School (commonly known as Shore). He then went to Cheshunt College, a theology college at Cambridge University in England. After obtaining a Bachelor of Arts, he studied for a diploma in anthropology under A. C. Haddon, who had carried out anthropological research in the Torres Strait Islands, which are situated between the west of PNG and Australia.

== Missionary career ==
Abel took over as head of the Kwato mission after the death of his father in a car accident in England in 1930. Although frequently compared to his father, his approach as a missionary differed from that of Charles Abel. At Cambridge, he had been influenced by the American Lutheran, Frank Buchman, who was the founder of the Oxford Group, which would later be known as Moral Re-Armament. While his father had largely stayed in the Kwato mission, Cecil Abel and his siblings began, with government endorsement, to proselytize in other areas, particularly in areas occupied by the Kunika or Keveri people 125 miles (201 km) to the west of Kwato.

== World War II ==
As a result of Japan's entry into World War II with its attack on Pearl Harbor in December 1941, the majority of non-Papuans were evacuated to Australia. Abel and a colleague, Geoffrey Baskett, were allowed to remain at Kwato. They provided equipment and organized labour to assist the Australian army in developing Milne Bay as a base, and supplied wood from the Kwato mission sawmill. In the Battle of Milne Bay in August–September 1942, the Japanese attack was easily resisted by Australian troops. Later, Abel's knowledge of the area proved useful. He organized labour gangs to build a military airfield, which was named Abel's Field. With his boat, the MV Osiri, one of the few small boats left after the Japanese invasion, he also helped to supply the coastwatchers, who were usually Australians who had not been evacuated and had undertaken to observe enemy movements and rescue stranded Allied personnel. As an ordained minister, Abel also performed marriages at Kwato between American soldiers and the many American nurses who had been sent to Milne Bay. Together with his brother, Russell, he also contributed Tales of New Guinea to the Stevie Seabee newsletter, a daily newsletter published for the American troops.

== Post-war activities ==
After the war, the Kwato mission declined. At the same time, reduced support from overseas donors still recovering from the war, compounded by apparent financial irregularities during Abel's period as treasurer, threatened the future of the Kwato Extension Association, the body that had managed the mission's assets since being established by his father in 1917. Abel resigned from the mission and eventually moved to PNG's future capital Port Moresby.

In 1964, he was asked by the administrator of the Territory of Papua and New Guinea, Sir Donald Cleland, to join the staff of the new Administrative College, where he taught political science. Together with a number of his students, including Michael Somare and Albert Maori Kiki, he became involved in an informal group known as the Bully Beef Club. In 1967, this group was the basis for the Pangu Party, which demanded self-government.

Abel was elected to the House of Assembly of Papua and New Guinea as a Pangu Party member for Milne Bay (Regional) in 1968. Later that year. he drafted the party's economic policy, which emphasised the need to increase overseas capital investment; raise exports in both primary and secondary sectors; reduce imports and encourage import replacement; greatly increase secondary industry; and move from a subsistence to a cash economy. The policy stated that: "We must aim for a reasonable equality of wealth between black and white, or rather, between haves and have nots."

After the 1972 elections, in which Abel did not stand, the Pangu Party formed the administration, with Somare as chief minister. Abel remained as an advisor to Somare, who became prime minister following independence in 1975. He is credited with writing the preamble to the Papua New Guinea constitution.

== Awards and honours ==
Abel was made an Officer of the Order of the British Empire in 1972. He was awarded a knighthood (KBE) in 1982.

== Personal life ==
On 14 August 1951, Abel married Semi Bwagagaia, a schoolteacher from Logea Island and granddaughter of the traditional owner of Kwato. The marriage followed allegations of relationships between Abel and Papuan women at the mission and was objected to by influential Papuans at the mission.

Abel died on 25 June 1994 in Brisbane, Australia, after an operation for a brain tumour. Following a memorial ceremony in Port Moresby, with a eulogy from Somare, he was buried at Kwato Island. His wife predeceased him. They had two adopted daughters and an adopted son, Andrew, who is known as a pioneer of surfing in PNG.
