= Alcester Island =

Island in Papua New Guinea

Coordinates: 9°33′17″S 152°26′31″E

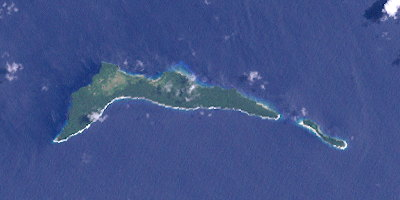

Alcester Island (known as Nasikuab or Nasikwabw by its inhabitants) is the largest of the Alcester Islands, between Woodlark Island and Egum Atoll, Milne Bay Province, Papua New Guinea.

It is located in the Solomon Sea at the eastern end of the New Guinea mainland, 50 km SW of Woodlark Island. It is one of the Trobriand Islands (today officially known as the Kiriwina Islands), which are an archipelago of coral atolls.

Politically, they are part of Murua Rural LLG, Samarai-Murua District, Milne Bay Province in southeastern Papua New Guinea.
