= Quessant Island =

Island in Papua New Guinea

Native name: Tariwerwi Island
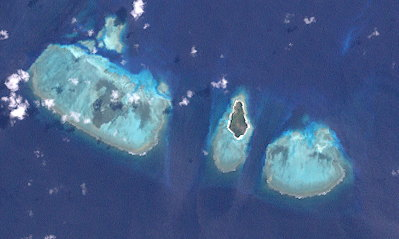

- Location within Papua New Guinea

Geography
- Location: Oceania
- Coordinates: 11.15°S 151.26°E
- Archipelago: Louisiade Archipelago
- Adjacent to: Solomon Sea
- Total islands: 1
- Area: 0.41 km^{2} (0.16 sq mi)
- Length: 1 km (0.6 mi)
- Width: 0.5 km (0.31 mi)
- Highest elevation: 10 m (30 ft)

Administration
- Papua New Guinea
- Province: Milne Bay
- District: Samarai-Murua District
- LLG: Louisiade Rural Local Level Government Area \ Yaleyamba Rural LLG \ Bwanabwana
- Island Group: Wari Islands

Demographics
- Population: 0 (2014)
- Pop. density: 0/km^{2} (0/sq mi)
- Ethnic groups: Papauans, Austronesians, Melanesians.

Additional information
- Time zone: AEST (UTC+10)
- ISO code: PG-MBA
- Official website: web.archive.org/web/20101223043232/http://oceandots.com/pacific/png/deboyne.php

Quessant (Tariwerwi or Ouessant) is an uninhabited island in the Louisiade Archipelago. Politically, it is part of Milne Bay Province in southeastern Papua New Guinea. Quessant is located 30 km southeast of Wari on the northeastern border of the coastal reef. The coral island is low and covered with delicious vegetation. Three reefs are located between Quessant and the Stuers Islands, about 16 km to the northwest.

Louis Antoine de Bougainville discovered the island on June 17, 1768, and named them for their resemblance to Ushant, the French island near Brest, the starting point of his circumnavigation.
