= Kitai Lilivea Island =

Island in Papua New Guinea

Nickname: Connor Island
- Location within Papua New Guinea

Geography
- Location: Oceania
- Coordinates: 10°39′44″S 151°05′19″E
- Archipelago: Louisiade Archipelago
- Adjacent to: Solomon Sea
- Total islands: 1
- Major islands: Kitai Lilivea
- Area: 3 km^{2} (1.2 sq mi)
- Length: 1.3 km (0.81 mi)
- Width: 2.8 km (1.74 mi)
- Coastline: 8.1 km (5.03 mi)
- Highest elevation: 154 m (505 ft)
- Highest point: Mount Lilivea

Administration
- Papua New Guinea
- Province: Milne Bay
- Island Group: Samarai Islands
- Island Group: Kitai Islands
- Ward: Bedauna Ward
- Largest settlement: Kitai (pop. 190)

Demographics
- Population: 190 (2014)
- Pop. density: 57/km^{2} (148/sq mi)
- Ethnic groups: Papuans, Austronesians, Melanesians.

Additional information
- Time zone: AEST (UTC+10)
- ISO code: PG-MBA
- Official website: www.ncdc.gov.pg

Kitai Lilivea Island (also known as Connor Island) is an island in the Louisiade Archipelago, off the east coast of Basilaki Island, Milne Bay Province, Papua New Guinea.

== Administration ==
The island is part of Bedauna Ward which belongs to Bwanabwana Rural Local Level Government Area LLG, Samarai-Murua District, which are in Milne Bay Province.

== Geography ==
Kitai Lilivea is part of the Kitai Islands, itself a part of Samarai Islands of the Louisiade Archipelago. It is located between Kitai Katoa Island and the Kitai Katu Island.
