= Stuers Islands =

Archipelago in Papua New Guinea

- Location within Papua New Guinea

Geography
- Location: Oceania
- Coordinates: 11°06′48″S 151°08′32″E
- Archipelago: Louisiade Archipelago
- Adjacent to: Solomon Sea
- Total islands: 2
- Major islands: Marai; Taliwewai
- Area: 0.34 km^{2} (0.13 sq mi)
- Highest elevation: 20 m (70 ft)
- Highest point: Mount Marai

Administration
- Papua New Guinea
- Province: Milne Bay
- District: Samarai-Murua District
- LLG: Louisiade Rural Local Level Government Area \ Yaleyamba Rural LLG \ Bwanabwana
- Island Group: Stuers Islands
- Largest settlement: Marai

Demographics
- Population: 0 (2014)
- Pop. density: 0/km^{2} (0/sq mi)
- Ethnic groups: Papauans, Austronesians, Melanesians.

Additional information
- Time zone: AEST (UTC+10)
- ISO code: PG-MBA
- Official website: www.ncdc.gov.pg

The Stuers Islands are an uninhabited archipelago in the Louisiade Archipelago. Politically, they are part of Milne Bay Province in southeastern Papua New Guinea.

The islands are located 16 km southeast of Wari. Quessant (Tariwerwi) is another 16 km to the southeast. The archipelago consists of two islands, Marai (29 ha ) and Taliwewai (4.6 ha). Marai is the larger of the two islands. It is 20 m high. Taliwewai is 1.7 km north-east and is 12 m high. In the West of the Stuers Islands is a large area with reefs and shoals called Uluma reefs.
