= Daga =

Daga may refer to:

== People ==
- Daga (wrestler), Mexican professional wrestler
- Dagmara Wozniak, American Olympic saber fencer

== Geography ==
- Daga District, Bhutan
- Daga, Bhutan, capital of Daba District
- Daga Hundred, a geographic division in Sweden
- Daga Island, an island located in the southeastern part of Lake Tana in Ethiopia
- Daga River (disambiguation)
- Daga Rural LLG, Papua New Guinea

== Organizations ==
- Democratic Attorneys General Association

== Other ==
- Daga language, in Papua New Guinea
