= Murua =

Murua, or Murúa is a Basque surname. Notable people with the surname include:

- Ainhoa Murúa (born 1978), Basque triathlete
- Irune Murua (born 1986), Spanish footballer
- Lautaro Murúa (1926–1995), Chilean-Argentine actor, film director, and screenwriter
- Martín de Murúa (c. 1525 – c. 1618), Spanish Mercedarian friar and missionary

== See also ==
- Murua Rural LLG in Papua New Guinea
- Name variant of Woodlark Island
