= Obstruction =

Obstruction may refer to:

== Places ==
- Obstruction Island, in Washington state
- Obstruction Islands, east of New Guinea

== Medicine ==
- Obstructive jaundice
- Obstructive sleep apnea
- Airway obstruction, a respiratory problem
  - Recurrent airway obstruction
- Bowel obstruction, a blockage of the intestines
- Gastric outlet obstruction
- Distal intestinal obstruction syndrome
- Congenital lacrimal duct obstruction
- Bladder outlet obstruction

== Politics and law ==
- Obstruction of justice, the crime of interfering with law enforcement
- Obstructionism, the practice of deliberately delaying or preventing a process or change, especially in politics
- Emergency Workers (Obstruction) Act 2006

== Science and mathematics ==
- Obstruction set in forbidden graph characterizations, in the study of graph minors in graph theory
- Obstruction theory, a mathematical theory
- Propagation path obstruction
  - Single Vegetative Obstruction Model

== Sports ==
- Obstruction (baseball), when a fielder illegally hinders a baserunner
- Obstructing the field

== See also ==
- The Five Obstructions, a 2003 film
- USS Obstructor, an American minelayer ship used in World War II
