= Obstruction Islands =

Archipelago in Papua New Guinea

Coordinates: 10°16′S 150°56′E

The Obstruction Islands are an archipelago east of New Guinea island, located within Milne Bay Province in the southeastern region of Papua New Guinea.

== Geography ==
The islands are located between the Eastern Cape of New Guinea and Nuakata Island. They received the name Obstruction Islands because they block the passage between Nuakata Island and the mainland of eastern New Guinea island.

The archipelago administratively belongs to the Maramatana Rural LLG (Local Level Government) Area within the Alotau District of Milne Bay Province.

=== Islands ===
The larger islands of the archipelago are:

- Mei Mei Ara — 38 hectares [94 acres]
- Iabama — 34 hectares [84 acres]
- Lelei Gana, or Pahilele — 29 hectares [72 acres]
- Boia Boia Waga — 13 hectares [32 acres]
- Kana Cuba — 2.6 hectares [6.4 acres]
- Hibwa — 0.3 hectares [0.74 acres]

=== Population ===
In the 2000 census, the Obstruction Islands group had a population of 231 inhabitants, with 180 on Hibwa, and 51 on Lelei Gana/Pahilele.

== See also ==
- Archipelagoes of Papua New Guinea
- Islands of Papua New Guinea
