= Sideia Island =

Island in Papua New Guinea

Nickname: St. Bonaventure Island
- Location within Papua New Guinea

Geography
- Location: Oceania
- Coordinates: 10°35′19″S 150°52′55″E
- Archipelago: Louisiade Archipelago
- Adjacent to: Solomon Sea
- Total islands: 1
- Major islands: Sideia
- Area: 101.3 km^{2} (39.1 sq mi)
- Length: 13.5 km (8.39 mi)
- Width: 15.5 km (9.63 mi)
- Coastline: 150 km (93 mi)
- Highest elevation: 377 m (1237 ft)
- Highest point: Mount Kipoki

Administration
- Papua New Guinea
- Province: Milne Bay
- Island Group: Samarai Islands
- Island Group: Sideia Islands
- Ward: split
- Largest settlement: Sideia (pop. 400)

Demographics
- Population: 1890 (2014)
- Pop. density: 18.66/km^{2} (48.33/sq mi)
- Ethnic groups: Papauans, Austronesians, Melanesians.

Additional information
- Time zone: AEST (UTC+10)
- ISO code: PG-MBA
- Official website: www.ncdc.gov.pg

Sideia Island is an island in the Louisiade Archipelago in Milne Bay Province, Papua New Guinea.

== Administration ==
The island is part of the following Wards:

- Sauasauaga, on the southwest cape. (This Ward is mostly on Sariba)
- Gotai, on the southeast area (with Populai Island)
- Sekuku, on the central area (with Dinana Island)
- Tegerauna, on the northeast area.
- Sideia, on the northwest area.

All Wards belong to Bwanabwana Rural Local Level Government Area LLG, Samarai-Murua District, which are in Milne Bay Province.

== History ==
Sideia Island was sighted by Europeans when the Spanish expedition of Luís Vaez de Torres arrived on 18 July 1606. Their ship, San Pedro anchored at Oba Bay in the south west, that they then named Puerto San Francisco. It was later renamed as Puerto Lerma after the 1st Duke of Lerma. Torres named the island St. Bonaventure.

The mission in that island was established on April 22, 1932, by the Australian Province of the French Congregation Missionaries of the Sacred Heart (MSC). By 1942, it was fully developed and became the base for other missions in the nearby islands. Many facilities were set up to provide education, medical assistance and ways of living to the native of the area.

== Geography ==
Sideia is located East of the end of New Guinea mainland. Its area is 101.3 km^{2}. The island is part of the Sideia group, itself a part of Samarai Islands of the Louisiade Archipelago. It is located between Sariba Island and Basilaki Island. The island of Sideia is quite near Alotau and can be reached in less than three hours by motor boat.

== Demographics ==
The population of 1890 is living in 30 villages across the island. The most important one, and where the dock is located, is Sideia. The other villages: Lamoasi, Mwalotakilili, Dumalawe, Paka, Gugui, Gadogadowa, Oba, Memeali, Kunubala, Gabutau, Makabweabweau, Nasauwai, Tabuara, Liliki, Kalu, Gotai, Wanahaua, Sekuku, Waiyau, Goteia, Kaula, Kubi, Boikalakalawa, Namoa, Dulaona, Balagatete, Tegerauna

== Economy ==
The islanders, are farmers as opposed to eastern Louisiade Archipelago islanders. they grow Sago, Taro, and Yams for crops.

== Transportation ==
There is a dock at Sideia.

== Flora and fauna ==
The following mammals are on the island:

- Polynesian rat
- Black rat
- Eastern common cuscus
- Moncton's mosaic-tailed rat
- Black-tailed mosaic-tailed rat
- Eastern rat
- Giant white-tailed rat
- New Guinea naked-backed fruit bat
- Long-tongued nectar bat
- Small flying fox
- Island tube-nosed fruit bat
- Geoffroy's rousett
- Common blossom bat

The following fish are near the island:

- Acanthuridae
- Balistidae
- Belonidae
- Carangidae
- Holocentridae
- Kyphosidae
- Lethrinidae
- Lutjanidae
- Mugilidae
- Mullidae
- Scaridae
- Serranidae
- Siganidae
- Sphyraenidae
