= Samarai Islands =

Archipelago in Papua New Guinea

- Interactive map of Samarai Islands

Geography
- Coordinates: 11°12′S 153°00′E
- Archipelago: Louisiade Archipelago
- Total islands: 50
- Major islands: 5
- Area: 262.1 km^{2} (101.2 sq mi)

Administration
- Papua New Guinea
- Province: Milne Bay Province
- Capital city: Samarai
- Largest settlement: Samarai (pop. 460)

Demographics
- Population: 8200 (2014)

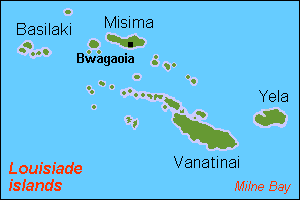
Louisiade Archipelago map, with Basilaki Island of the Samarai Islands group (northeast/upper left).

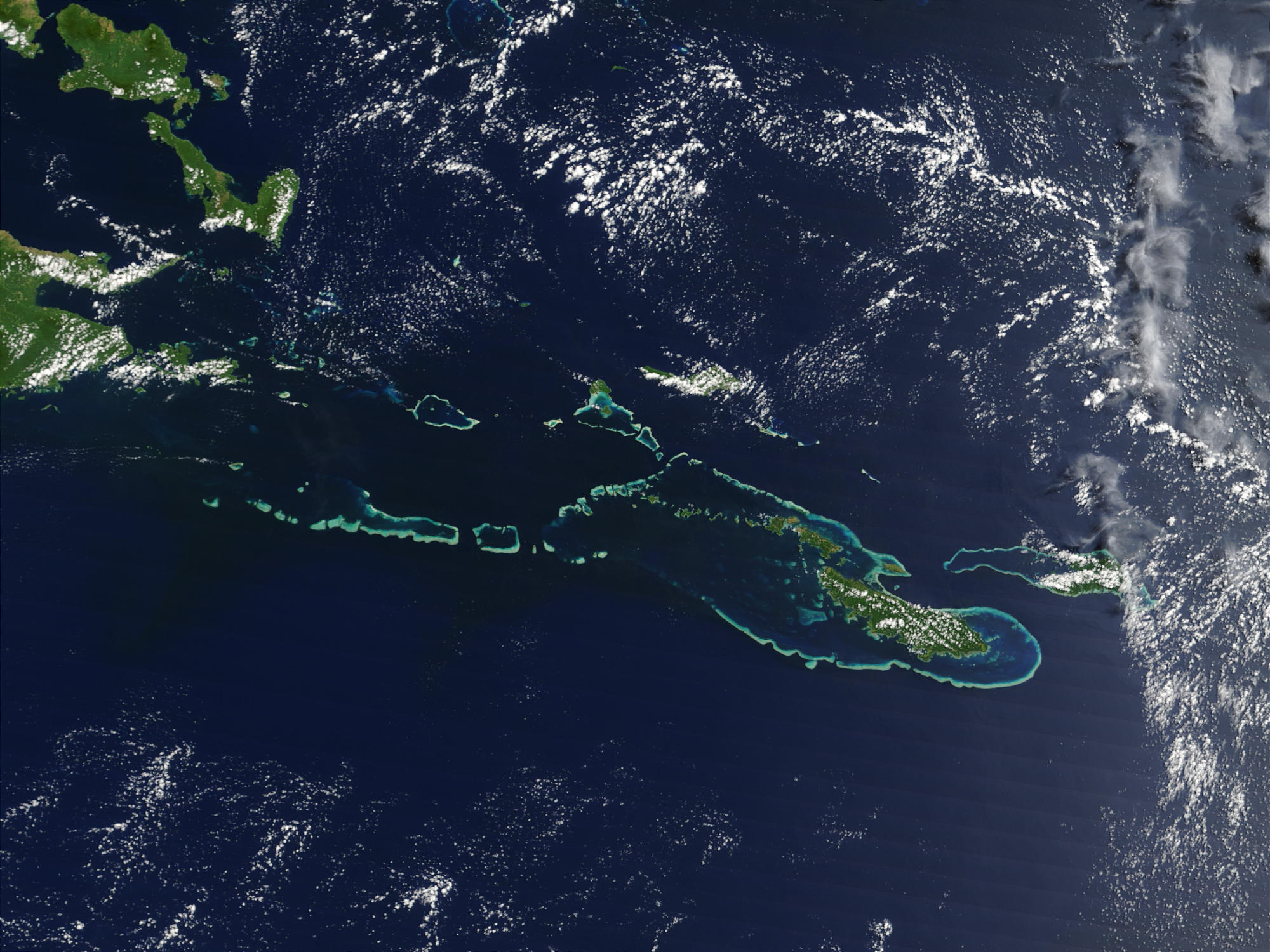
Aerial view of Rossel Island (east/left) and Vanatinai−Tagula Island (west/right). Misima Island is hidden by clouds (northeast of center).

The Samarai Islands archipelago, part of the larger Louisiade Archipelago, is located 50 kilometres (31 mi) southeast of mainland New Guinea island, within the nation of Papua New Guinea.

== Geography ==
The archipelago consists of: 4 larger volcanic islands frequently fringed by coral reefs; and 30 smaller coral islands.

The islands stretch over more than 50 kilometres (31 mi), and spread over an ocean area of 1,000 square kilometres (390 mi^{2}), between the Solomon Sea to the north and the Coral Sea to the south. The aggregate land area of the islands is about 262.1 square kilometres (101.2 mi^{2}), with Basilaki Island being the largest.

Logea Island, Samarai Island and Sariba Island lie closest to mainland New Guinea, while the Kitai Group lies further east.

The entire archipelago is within the Bwanabwana Rural LLG (Local Level Government), a part of the Samarai-Murua District in Milne Bay Province, southeastern Papua New Guinea. The seat of the Bwanabwana Rural LLG is Samarai, the population center of the Samarai Islands archipelago.

=== List of islands ===
- Basilaki Island
- Beika Island
- Bonarua Hili Hili Island
- Buiari Island
- Castori Islets
- Dagadaga Bonarua Island
- Deka Deka Island
- Didigilo Island
- Dinana Island
- Doini Island
- Ebuma Island
- Gado-Gadoa Island
- Galahi Island
- Gesila Island
- Gonabarabara Island
- Grant Island
- Igwali Island
- Ito Island
- Kitai Bai Island
- Kato Katoa Island
- Kitai Bona Bona Island
- Kitai Katu Island
- Kitai Lilivea Island
- Kui Island
- Kwai Ama Island
- Kwato Island
- Lesimano Island
- Logea Island
- Nasariri Island
- Populai Island
- Samarai Island
- Sariba Island
- Sideia Island
- Sripkunui Island
- Tuyam Island
- Wasima Island

== History ==
Malay and Chinese sailors may have visited the islands before European explorers. The islands most likely first sighted by Europeans in 1606, by Luis Váez de Torres. Louis Antoine de Bougainville named them the Louisiades in 1768 for King Louis XV. European stops were also paid by Admiral Bruni d'Entrecasteaux in 1793, and Captain Owen Stanley in 1849.

== Climate ==
The islands have a moist tropical climate, and are largely covered with tropical moist broadleaf forests.

== See also ==
- Bwanabwana language
- Archipelagoes of Papua New Guinea
