= Dart Reefs =

Group of reefs

Dart Reef
- Location within Papua New Guinea

Geography
- Coordinates: 9°34′59.99″S 150°11′00″E
- Type: Reef
- Adjacent to: Milne Bay

Administration
- Papua New Guinea

Additional information
- Time zone: AEST (UTC+10)
- Official website: www.ncdc.gov.pg

The Dart Reefs is a group of reefs in the central area of the Ward Hunt Strait in Milne Bay Province of southeastern Papua New Guinea.

The reefs are ribbon-like structured patch reefs.

They are located approximately 15 km from New Guinea island, and the same distance from Goodenough Island of the D'Entrecasteaux Islands archipelago.

== See also ==
- Islands of Milne Bay Province
