= Daga River =

Daga River may refer to

- Daga River, an alternative spelling of Daya River, India
- Dagā River, Burma
- Daga River (South Sudan)
