= Ward Hunt Strait =

Strait in Papua New Guinea

- Location within Papua New Guinea
- Coordinates: 9°34′S 150°8′E
- Type: strait

The Ward Hunt Strait is a 30 km wide stretch of water in Milne Bay, separating Papua New Guinea from Goodenough Island in the D'Entrecasteaux Islands. The Dart Reefs and Keast Reef are located in the centre of the channel. The strait was named in honour of George Ward Hunt, First Lord of the Admiralty (1874-1877), by Captain John Moresby.

== See also ==
- Papua New Guinea
- Dart Reefs
- Keast Reef
- George Ward Hunt
