= Sanaroa Island =

Island in Papua New Guinea

Coordinates: 9.6166667°S 151°E

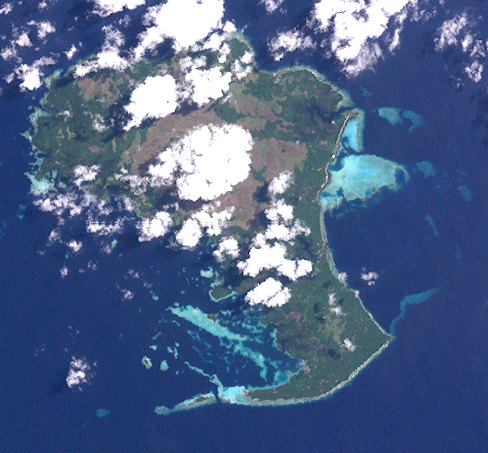
Satellite image of Sanaroa Island

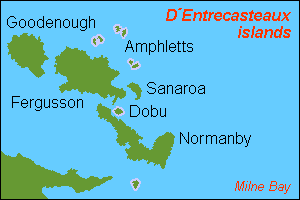
Location of Sanaroa Island within D'Entrecasteaux Islands

Sanaroa Island (also known as Welle Island) is part of the D'Entrecasteaux Islands in Papua New Guinea, located east of Fergusson Island in Milne Bay Province. The population of Sanaroa is less than 6000.

== Education ==
Sanaroa has one primary school run by the Catholic Church. Students attend from all over Sanaroa, some walking or canoeing 5 km (3.1 mi) to school. Many of the students have rarely or never left the island, and have little exposure to urban life. The island's two main religions are the United Church and Catholic Church. In 2007 a Christian Mission Fellowship church was established. Today many students have formally done grade 8 and many have continued to high school. However the biggest problem that the students face is school fees and unfortunately many have withdrawn from school. Despite the problems, a few others have been assisted and supported by their parents and relatives have ventured to find jobs in towns and are working. Education is recently seen as important to raise the standard of living and bring changes to the villages and families. Another elementary school has been built in Siawawa section to reduce the distance some children have to travel, with an enrollment of around 70.

== Council areas ==
Sanaroa's three council areas are Etana, Siawawa Udaudana and Tewala island.

== Language ==
The Sanaroa language has faded or disappeared and most people now use the Dobu language. The local people call Sanaroa the K language because the 'k' sound is used frequently. Today there are no persons speaking the language. The last woman who used the "K" language was Mis Abokagu from Gadigadili Village. Sanaroa was part of the dialect continuum of the Dobu language, which has up to 100,000 speakers.

== Culture ==
Sanaroa was mentioned in the classic anthropological work by Bronislaw Malinowski, called Argonauts of the Western Pacific, that describes the cultural exchange between islands, known as the Kula ring, which involved reciprocal exchange trading arrangements between the Trobriand Islands to the north, the D'Entrecasteaux Islands, and the islands of Milne Bay to the south.

== Life style ==
The local people live a subsistence-farming lifestyle. The people on the island go fishing and do gardening to feed themselves. The staple foods are yams, sago, fish and bananas. They use canoes, dinghies and other sea-going vessels as transport. There are no trucks, cars, mains power or airports on the island. The economy of the island thus heavily depends on the sea or the marine resource to earn cash.

== Natural events ==
Sanaroa island is experiencing sea erosion due to wave action, and tides and sea currents and some smaller islands appear to be sinking quickly. However, climate change does not yet appear to have had a significant impact on the area's reefs, which have some of the best coral cover and highest marine biodiversity of any location in the eastern Coral Triangle, and no coral bleaching damage.
