= Maramatana Rural LLG =

Local-level government in Papua New Guinea

- Country: Papua New Guinea
- Province: Milne Bay Province
- Time zone: UTC+10 (AEST)

Maramatana Rural LLG is a local-level government (LLG) of Milne Bay Province, Papua New Guinea.

== Wards ==
- 01. Lavora
- 02. Topura
- 03. Iapoa No. 1
- 04. Wamawamana
- 05. Taupota
- 06. Garuahi
- 07. Awaiama
- 08. Keia
- 09. Iapoa No. 2
- 10. Porotana
- 11. Huhuna
- 12. Guga
- 13. Wagohuhu
- 14. Biwa
- 15. Ibulai
- 16. Ronana
- 17. East Cape
- 18. Iabam/Pahilele
- 19. Nuakata
