= Suau Rural LLG =

Local-level government in Papua New Guinea

- Country: Papua New Guinea
- Province: Milne Bay Province
- Time zone: UTC+10 (AEST)

Suau Rural LLG is a local-level government (LLG) of Milne Bay Province, Papua New Guinea. The Suau language is spoken in the LLG.

== Wards ==
- 01. Koukou
- 02. Iloilo
- 03. Bonarua
- 04. Modewa
- 05. Baibaisiga
- 06. Suau Island
- 07. Sibalai
- 08. Ipulai
- 09. Savalala
- 10. Navabu
- 11. Isuae
- 12. Savaia
- 13. Oyamamania
- 14. Isudiudiu
- 15. Saga'aho
- 16. Isuisu
- 17. Isudau
- 18. Sea'sea Island
- 19. Sea'sea North
- 20. Silosilo
- 21. Kaukau
- 22. Bonabona Island
- 23. Dahuni
- 24. Leileiafa
- 25. Suieabina
- 26. Gadaisu
- 27. Wadauda
- 28. Boilave
- 29. Takwatakwae
