= Daga Rural LLG =

Local-level government in Papua New Guinea

- Location within Papua New Guinea
- Coordinates: 9.89°S 149.47°E
- Country: Papua New Guinea
- Province: Milne Bay Province
- Time zone: UTC+10 (AEST)

Daga Rural LLG is a local-level government (LLG) of Milne Bay Province, Papua New Guinea.

== Wards ==
- 01. Gaunani
- 02. Birat
- 03. Bonenau
- 04. Param
- 05. Kakaia
- 06. Payawa
- 07. Ilakae - Modeni
- 08. Uni
- 09. Bibitan
- 10. Danawan
- 11. Biman
- 12. Gwagut
- 13. Gwadede
- 14. Eviaua
- 15. Gwaira
- 16. Kanaturu
- 17. Gauwa
- 18. Gwiroro
