= Murua Rural LLG =

Local-level government in Papua New Guinea

- Country: Papua New Guinea
- Province: Milne Bay Province
- Time zone: UTC+10 (AEST)

Murua Rural LLG is a local-level government (LLG) of Milne Bay Province, Papua New Guinea.

== Wards ==
- 01. Kulumadau
- 02. Guasopa
- 03. Wabununa
- 04. Kavatana
- 05. Kaurai
- 06. Iwa
- 07. Unumatana
- 08. Budibudi
- 09. Yanaba
- 10. Gawa Island
- 11. Kauwai
- 12. Madau
- 13. Dikoias
- 14. Kwaiwata
- 15. Muneiveyova
- 16. Oyavata
- 17. Alcester
