= Samarai =

Island and former administrative capital in Papua New Guinea

Samarai Island
- Location within Papua New Guinea

Geography
- Location: Oceania
- Coordinates: 10°36′45″S 150°39′53″E
- Archipelago: Louisiade Archipelago
- Adjacent to: Solomon Sea
- Total islands: 1
- Major islands: Samarai
- Area: 0.29 km^{2} (0.11 sq mi)
- Length: 0.8 km (0.5 mi)
- Width: 0.4 km (0.25 mi)
- Coastline: 2.31 km (1.435 mi)
- Highest elevation: 10 ft (3 m)

Administration
- Papua New Guinea
- Province: Milne Bay
- Island Group: Samarai Islands
- Ward: split
- Largest settlement: Samarai (pop. 460)

Demographics
- Population: 460 (2014)
- Pop. density: 1,580/km^{2} (4090/sq mi)
- Ethnic groups: Papauans, Austronesians, Melanesians.

Additional information
- Time zone: AEST (UTC+10)
- ISO code: PG-MBA
- Official website: www.ncdc.gov.pg

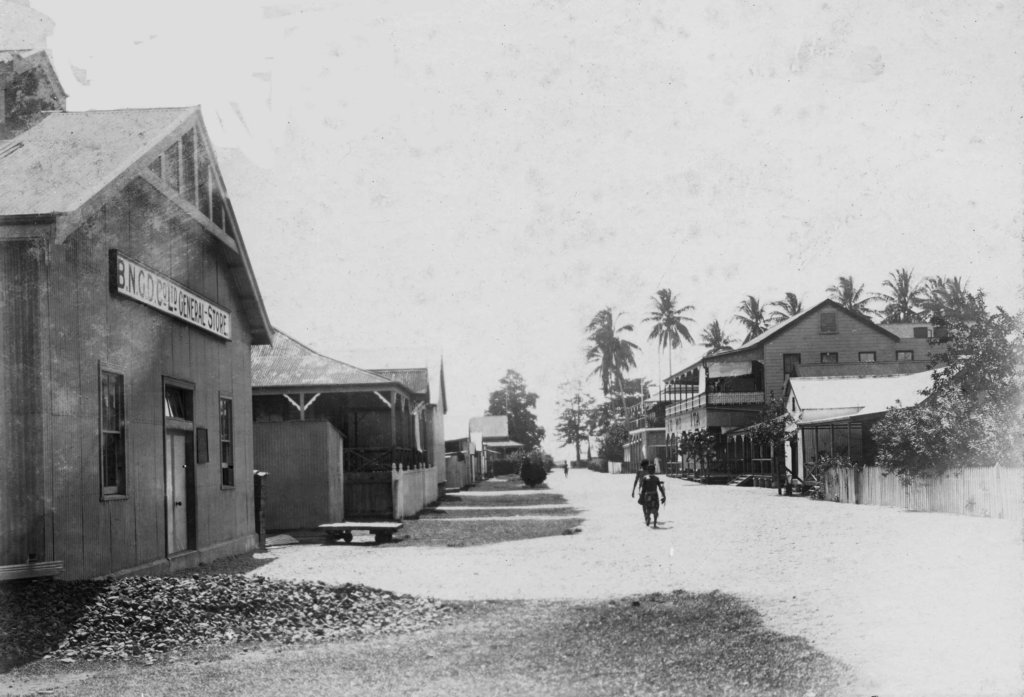
A commercial street scene on Samarai from 1906

Samarai is an island and former administrative capital in Milne Bay Province, Papua New Guinea.

The island is historically significant as the site of a trading port and stop-over between Australia and East Asia. Samarai town was established on the island and at its height was the second largest after Port Moresby in the Territory of Papua.

The town of Samarai was ordered to be destroyed by the British during World War II, fearing Japanese occupation. Although rebuilt after the war, and functioning as provincial headquarters until 1968, economic changes meant that Samarai did not fully regain its regional status and it has since largely fallen into disrepair. The island was declared a National Historical Heritage Island by the government of Papua New Guinea in 2006.

== Geography ==
Located off the south-eastern tip of New Guinea in the China Strait, Samarai has an area of just 285,000 square metres (70 acres) or 29 hectares. At the census of population 2014, the island had a population of 460, making it one of the most densely populated islands in the area. The island is part of the Samarai Islands of the Louisiade Archipelago.

== History ==
=== Settlement ===
The island was discovered by Captain John Moresby whilst commanding HMS Basilisk in 1873. Moresby originally called the island Dinner Island, after having a meal on it. Five years later in 1878 the Rev. S. MacFarlane of the London Missionary Society established a mission station on the island. A government officer was posted to the island after a protectorate had been declared over British New Guinea.

In 1884 a trader and sixty Papuans established a beach front store for passing ships. In the early years a large malarious swamp caused health problems for Samarai, but this was improved after 1898 when it was filled in. After the annexation of British New Guinea in 1888, Samarai became the headquarters of an administrative district. A court was subsequently established and a magistrate posted.

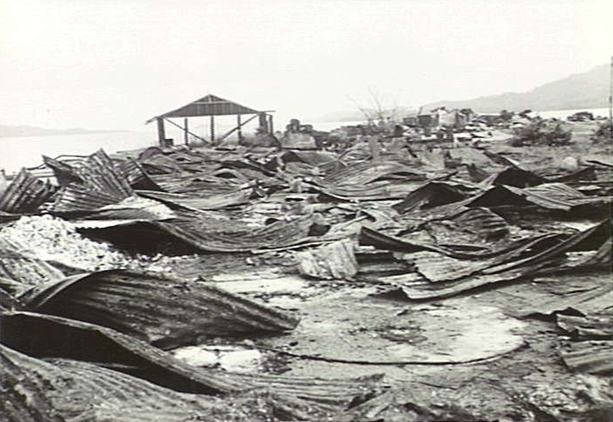
Destroyed buildings on Samarai in 1942

By the 20th century the island was a bustling cosmopolitan port town, administrative centre and major commercial centre. It was noted for its size and attractive appearance. In 1902 the value of goods exported from Samarai was three times the value of those exported from Port Moresby. By 1907 there were three pubs, the seat of a bishop, a rectory, church, three stores, government buildings, hospitals and private residences. Electric power was provided by 1927 and street lighting was installed.

=== Decline and World War II ===
By the 1920s the town had declined in importance and by the 1940s 70 percent of goods were now exported from Port Moresby, although Samarai was still significant in the trade of copra. In 1940 Sir Hubert Murray, the Lieutenant-Governor of the Territory of Papua, travelled to Samarai, after falling ill, and subsequently died on the island.

After the outbreak of World War II and with the Japanese advance into the Pacific the Australian Government ordered the evacuation of Samarai in January 1942 and later in the year it was destroyed to stop the wharves and buildings falling under Japanese control. In July 1943 a detachment of Seabees from the 84th Naval Construction Battalion built a seaplane base on the island as part of Naval Base Milne Bay. Despite a lack of materials the base including a 50 feet (15 m) ramp and hangar was constructed in 42 days. Patrol Squadron 101 (VP-101) flying PBY Catalinas was posted to the station. The USS San Pablo (AVP-30) and Aircraft Rescue Boat C-9485 operated from the Samarai Seaplane Base also.

Although Samarai was reestablished after the war, it never returned to its former size or influence and in 1968 the provincial capital for Milne Bay was moved to Alotau. Today the island is mostly isolated and little belies its past. In 2006 the prime minister of Papua New Guinea, Sir Michael Somare, declared the island a National Historical Heritage Island, and vowed to "restore basic services and refurbish its monuments and buildings as a tourist attraction".

== Administration ==
The island is split between 2 Wards: Samarai South, and Samarai North. Both belong to Bwanabwana Rural Local Level Government Area LLG, Samarai-Murua District, which are in Milne Bay Province.

== Demographics ==
The population of 458 at the last census shows a steady decline.

== Flora and fauna ==
Samarai is famous for having 2 species of bats:

- Lesser Papuan pipistrelle
- Watts's pipistrelle

== Transportation ==
There is a Port on the island, which was renovated in recent years.

== In popular culture ==
The phrase "Sorong to Samarai" (sometimes stylised as "Sorong2Samarai" or "S2S") is commonly used throughout Papua New Guinea and Western New Guinea to express solidarity and oneness and makes reference to both Sorong, a town in Southwest Papua, Indonesia, and Samarai, a small township being one of the easternmost point located in Milne Bay Province, Papua New Guinea. It is sometimes used by Papuan independence activists in reference to Papuan unification, in opposition to the common Indonesian phrase of "Sabang to Merauke". In 2016, the ARIA Music Awards-nominated Papua New Guinean-Australian musician Airileke released a single titled "Sorong Samarai".
