= China Strait =

Strait in Papua New Guinea

- Location within Papua New Guinea
- Location: Papua New Guinea
- Coordinates: 10°35′00″S 150°41′00″E
- Type: strait

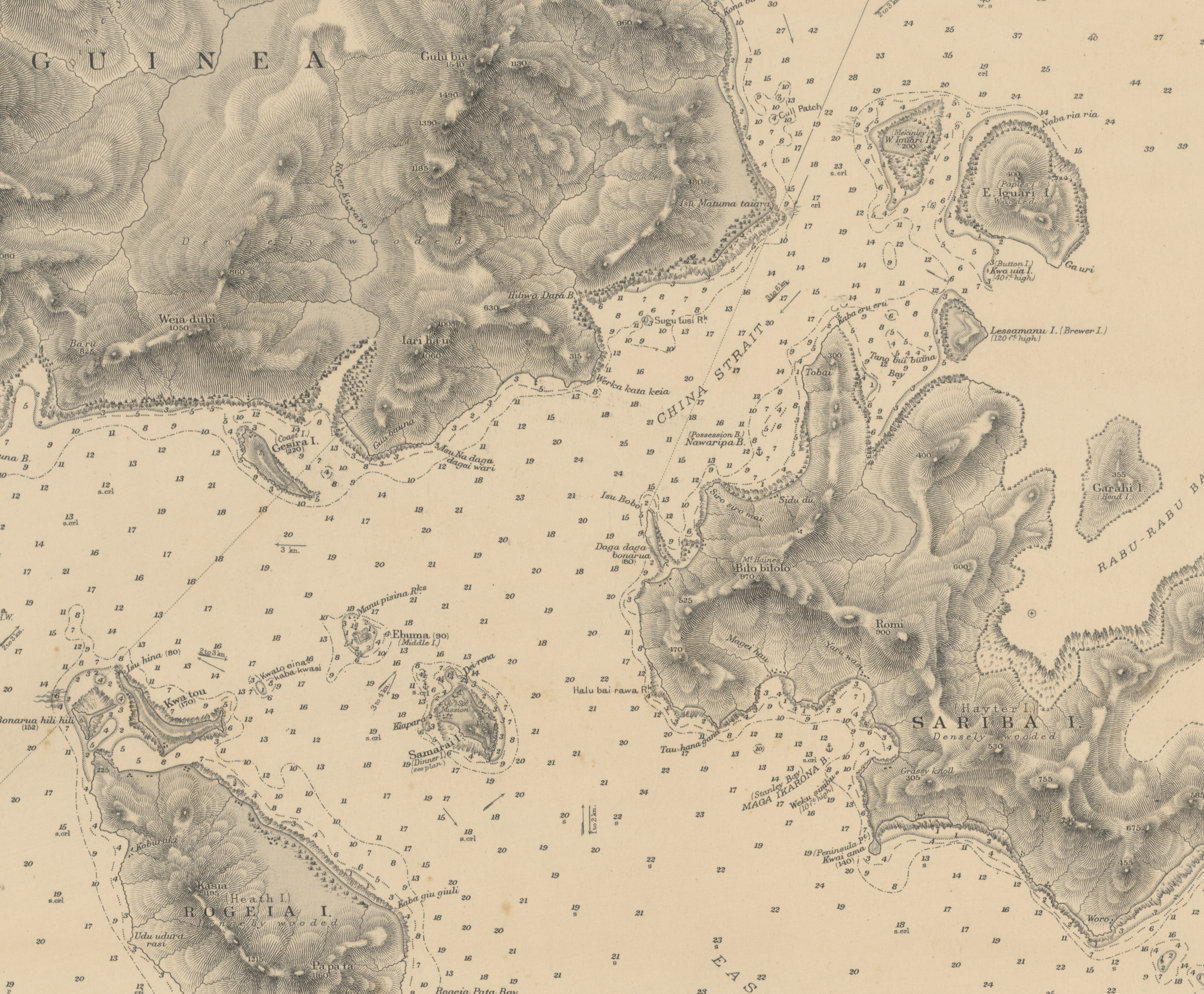
The China Strait as shown on a nautical chart from 1888

The China Strait is a navigable strait in the Milne Bay Province of Papua New Guinea between mainland New Guinea and Samarai Island. The strait, 4 nautical miles (7 km) in length and .75 nautical miles (1 km) wide, connects the Solomon Sea with the Coral Sea.
