= Logea Island =

Island in Milne Bay Province, Papua New Guinea

Nickname: Rogeia Island
- Location within Papua New Guinea

Geography
- Location: Oceania
- Coordinates: 10°38′19″S 150°38′55″E
- Archipelago: Louisiade Archipelago
- Adjacent to: Solomon Sea
- Total islands: 1
- Major islands: Logea
- Area: 9.02 km^{2} (3.48 sq mi)
- Length: 7.3 km (4.54 mi)
- Width: 2.3 km (1.43 mi)
- Coastline: 17.8 km (11.06 mi)
- Highest elevation: 1,215 ft (370.3 m)
- Highest point: Mount Kasia

Administration
- Papua New Guinea
- Province: Milne Bay
- Island Group: Samarai Islands
- Island Group: Logea Islands
- Ward: split
- Largest settlement: Kasabanalua (pop. 250)

Demographics
- Population: 1004 (2014)
- Pop. density: 111.3/km^{2} (288.3/sq mi)
- Ethnic groups: Papuans, Austronesians, Melanesians.

Additional information
- Time zone: AEST (UTC+10)
- ISO code: PG-MBA
- Official website: www.ncdc.gov.pg

Logea Island (also spelled Rogeia or Logeia) is a large island separating West Channel, East Channel and China Strait, just south of Milne Bay, in Milne Bay Province, Papua New Guinea.

== Administration ==
The island is split between 2 Wards: Logea South, and Logea North. both belong to Bwanabwana Rural Local Level Government Area LLG, Samarai-Murua District, which are in Milne Bay Province.

== Geography ==
The island, of volcanic origin, is part of the Logea group, itself a part of Samarai Islands of the Louisiade Archipelago. The highest point, known as Mount Kasia, has an elevation of 370 metres. Logea has a coastline of 17.8km.

== Demographics ==
The population of 1004 is split between 10 villages along the coast, where Kasabanalua on the north point serves as the center. Other villages are : Kumikuku, Bwasikauli, Panama Point, Dabali, Logea Pota, Isukopu, Gabui, Boiduhana and Dagedagela. The Saliba-Logea language is spoken on Logea Island as well as on Sariba Island and other neighbouring islands.

== Economy ==
The island tends to rise steeply from the shore. People mostly live on low land close to the shore, with their gardens being located in the hills. Like others from the Samarai Islands they are experts in boat building. The farmers grow Sago, Taro, and Yams. The island was formerly closely connected with the nearby island of Samarai when it was an administrative centre, and villagers in Logea would make regular visits to Samarai to go shopping. However, since 1968 when Alotau was made the provincial capital, Samarai has lost its commercial importance. It now has a resort, voted by Lonely Planet as one of the world's top ten eco-stays in 2014.

== Transportation ==
There are 2 docks at Kasabanalua and Pota.
