= Sariba Island =

Island in Papua New Guinea

- Location within Papua New Guinea

Geography
- Location: Oceania
- Coordinates: 10°36′30″S 150°43′30″E
- Archipelago: Louisiade Archipelago
- Adjacent to: Solomon Sea
- Total islands: 1
- Major islands: Sariba
- Area: 23.21 km^{2} (8.96 sq mi)
- Length: 5.5 km (3.42 mi)
- Width: 7.8 km (4.85 mi)
- Coastline: 41.6 km (25.85 mi)
- Highest elevation: 296 m (971 ft)
- Highest point: Mount Haines

Administration
- Papua New Guinea
- Province: Milne Bay
- Island Group: Samarai Islands
- Island Group: Sariba Islands
- Ward: split
- Largest settlement: Sidudu (pop. 300)

Demographics
- Population: 1880 (2014)
- Pop. density: 81/km^{2} (210/sq mi)
- Ethnic groups: Papuans, Austronesians, Melanesians.

Additional information
- Time zone: AEST (UTC+10)
- ISO code: PG-MBA
- Official website: www.ncdc.gov.pg

Saliba Island is an island to the south of Milne Bay in Milne Bay Province, Papua New Guinea.

== Administration ==
The island has 2 Wards: Sidudu in the northern part (with adjoining islands), and Sauasauaga on the southern part (which also includes adjoining islands and the western part of Sideia). Both Wards belong to Bwanabwana Rural Local Level Government Area LLG, Samarai-Murua District, which are in Milne Bay Province.

== Geography ==
The island is part of the Sariba group, itself a part of Samarai Islands of the Louisiade Archipelago. The island is only 240 meters at its closest part to the larger Sideia Island, near the town of Sauasauaga. Its highest point is 278 metres. Sariba has a tropical rainforest climate.

== History ==
Sariba Island was first sighted by Europeans when the Spanish expedition of Luís Vaez de Torres passed through Sawa Sawaga channel that they named Boca de Batalla (Battle Passage) on 20 July 1606. During World War II the US Navy built a seaplane base on the island as part of Naval Base Milne Bay. The base contained a camp for 130 men, a small boat pier, communications building, offices, and general storehouses.

== Demographics ==
The population of 1980 was living in 30 villages across the island. The most important one, and where the dock is located, is Sidudu. The other villages (clockwise): Simsimai, Nawaripa, Tobai, Wakoiara, Tanabuibuna, Sebuluna, Bwasikoko, Lamabo, Labulabu, Namoai, Isunaleilei, Sauasauaga, Dabunai, Bwastau, Porapa, Gamarai, Kwalosai, Iogi, Sunamaleuya, Kikina, Debasina, Koitubitubi, Magalkalona, Magesina, Magehau, Dagadaga.

== Economy ==
The islanders are farmers as opposed to eastern Louisiade Archipelago islanders. They grow Sago, Taro, and Yams for crops. There is a small boatbuilding industry, with many of the male inhabitants contributing to the work.

== Transportation ==
There is a dock at Sidudu.
