= Luís Vaz de Torres =

Galician maritime explorer (born c. 1565; fl. 1607)

Luís Vaz de Torres (Galician and Portuguese), or Luis Váez de Torres in the Spanish spelling (born c. 1565; fl. 1607), was a 16th- and 17th-century maritime explorer and captain of a Spanish expedition noted for the first recorded European navigation of the strait that separates the Australian mainland from the island of New Guinea, and which now bears his name (Torres Strait).

== Origins and early life ==
Captain Luis Váez de Torres was recorded as being called a "Breton" by crewmen in reports of the 1606 –1608 voyage, which points to an origin in the northwest historical territory of Spain, i.e., Galicia. Most contemporary historians accept this as evidence of his origins. The year and exact place of his birth are unknown; assuming him to have been in his late thirties or forties in 1606, a birth year of around 1565 is considered likely.

Torres has been presented by some writers as Portuguese, without any evidence to back up the claim. Galician spelling at the time was indistinguishable from Portuguese. Records never call Torres Portuguese but note remarks made by crew members of the Portuguese origins of Pedro Fernandes de Queirós.

Torres entered the navy of the Spanish Crown at some point and found his way to its South American possessions. He first entered the historical record as the nominated commander of the second ship in an expedition to the Pacific proposed by the Portuguese born navigator Pedro Fernandes de Queirós, searching for Terra Australis. There is no known contemporary depiction of his face or person.

== The Queirós voyage ==
Pedro Fernandes de Queirós was a Portuguese-born navigator who commanded a party of three Spanish ships, San Pedro y San Pablo (60 tons), San Pedrico (40 tons) and the tender Los Tres Reyes Magos. The three ships left Callao in Spanish Peru, on 21 December 1605, with Torres in command of the San Pedrico.

In May 1606, they reached a group of islands that would later be known as the New Hebrides and Vanuatu. Queirós named the group La Austrialia del Espiritu Santo: "Austrialia [sic] of the Holy Spirit". A morphological derivation of Austria, Queirós's neologism Austrialia was a reference to the Austrian origins of the House of Habsburg – to which the Spanish royal family belonged. The largest island in Vanuatu is still known officially by the abbreviated form, Espiritu Santo. Along with the ancient Latin name Terra Australis.

After six weeks, Queirós' ships put to sea again to explore the coastline. On the night of 11 June 1606, Queirós in the San Pedro y San Pablo became separated from the other ships in bad weather and was unable (or so he later said) to return to safe anchorage at Espiritu Santo. In reality, the crew mutinied, with the unfavorable wind conditions just giving them an opportunity to do so. The captain on the San Pedro y San Pablo named Don Diego de Prado, aware of the crew's plans, had already transferred to Torres' ship, and so did the expedition's surgeon. Queirós' ship, with Queirós being held in his cabin, then sailed to Acapulco in Mexico, where she arrived in November 1606. In the account by Prado, which is highly critical of Queirós, mutiny and poor leadership are given as the reason for Queirós' disappearance. Torres, in his account, says that whoever was in charge of San Pedro y San Pablo departed intentionally, saying "it was not possible for us to find them, for they did not sail on the proper course, nor with good intention". Later, although Torres' crew was displeased with Torres' decisions, a full-scale mutiny did not happen; Torres says his "condition was different to that of Captain Queirós."

== Torres assumes command ==
Torres remained at Espiritu Santo for 15 days before opening sealed orders he had been given by the Viceroy of Peru. These contained instructions on what course to follow if the ships became separated and who would be in command in the event of the loss of Queirós. The orders appear to have listed Prado as successor to Queirós, as he was capitán-entretenido (spare captain) on the voyage. However, there is overwhelming evidence Torres remained in command, including Prado's own account.

== The south coast of New Guinea and Torres Strait ==
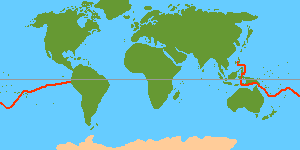
Torres' expedition

On 26 June 1606, the San Pedrico and Los Tres Reyes Magos under Torres' command set sail for Manila. Contrary winds prevented the ships taking the more direct route along the north coast of New Guinea. Prado's account notes that they sighted land on 14 July 1606, which was probably the island of Tagula in the Louisiade Archipelago, south east of New Guinea. The voyage continued over the next two months along the southeastern coast, and a number of landfalls were made to replenish the ships' food and water. The expedition discovered Milne Bay including Basilaki Island which they named Tierra de San Buenaventura, taking possession of the land for Spain in July 1606. This brought the Spaniards in close and sometimes violent contact with local indigenous people. Prado and Torres both record the capture of twenty people, including a woman who gave birth several weeks later. From these islands, Torres sailed along the southern coast of New Guinea reaching Orangerie Bay, which he named Bahía de San Lorenzo because he landed on 10 August, the feast of Saint Lawrence or San Lorenzo. The expedition then sailed to the Gulf of Papua, exploring and charting the coastline. Prado drew a number of sketch charts of anchorages in the Gulf of Papua, several of which survive.

Torres then took a route close to the New Guinea coast to navigate the 150-kilometre (93 mi) strait that now bears his name. In 1980, the Queensland master mariner Captain Brett Hilder proposed that it was more likely that Torres took a southerly route through the nearby channel now called Endeavour Strait, on 2–3 October 1606. From this position, he would certainly have seen Cape York, the northernmost extremity of Australia. According to 19th-century Australian writer George Collingridge, Torres "had discovered Australia without being aware of the fact". However, Willem Janszoon had made several landfalls on the west coast of the Cape York Peninsula 7 to 8 months prior, while Torres never claimed that he had sighted the southern continent. "Here there are very large islands, and more to the south" he wrote.

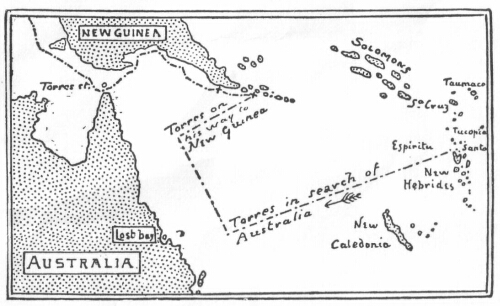
Torres' route near Australia

Torres followed the coastline of New Guinea, and claimed possession of the island in the name of the king of Spain on 18 October 1606. On 27 October, he reached the western extremity of New Guinea and then made his way north of Ceram and Misool toward the Halmahera Sea. At the beginning of January 1607. he reached Ternate, part of the Spice Islands. He sailed on 1 May for Manila, arriving on 22 May. The expedition proved that New Guinea was not part of the sought-after continent.

== Results of the voyage ==
Torres intended to personally present the captives, weapons and a detailed account to the king on his return to Spain. His short written account of the voyage indicates this. However, it appears there was no interest in Manila in outfitting his voyage back to Spain, and he was told his ships and men were required locally for the King’s service.

On 1 June 1607, two ships arrived in Manila from South America, one being Queirós former flagship San Pedro y San Pablo, now under another name, but with some of her former crewmen still aboard. Learning that Queirós had survived, Torres immediately wrote a report of his voyage to Queirós. Although that account no longer survives, Queirós himself referred to it in some of his many memorials to the king, agitating for another voyage.

The official account was written by Diego de Prado and signed by Torres and other officials in Manila on 6 June 1608. Torres, his crew and his captives disappear entirely from the historical record at this point, and their subsequent fate is unknown. Prado returned to Spain, possibly taking one of the captive New Guineans with him. Most documents of Torres' discoveries were not published, but on reaching Spain, filed away in Spanish archives, including Prado's lengthy account and the accompanying charts.

Between 1762 and 1765, written accounts of the Torres expedition were seen by British Admiralty Hydrographer Alexander Dalrymple. Dalrymple provided a sketch map which included the Queirós - Torres voyages to Joseph Banks, who undoubtedly passed this information to James Cook.

The original official manuscript account reappeared in the collections of Sir Thomas Phillips during the 19th century. On 26 June 1919, at the sale of some of Phillipps' manuscripts by Sotheby's, London, it was purchased by booksellers Henry Stevens, Son and Stiles who sold it to English collector Sir Leicester Harmsworth. The State Library of New South Wales in Australia acquired it from Harmsworth's collection in 1932. It went on public display for the first time in August 1997.

== Accounts of the voyage ==
There are a number of surviving documents that describe the Queirós – Torres voyages. Most significant are:

- Queirós' many subsequent memorials to King Philip III regarding the voyage and further exploration,
- Torres brief account to the king (written July 1607),
- Prado's narrative Relacion Sumaria (first written in 1608) and 4 charts of New Guinea,
- Juan Luis Arias de Loyola's memorial to King Philip IV (written about 1630 and based on discussions between Queirós and Loyola).

1617 may be the date of the first English translation of one of Queirós' memorials, as Terra Australis Incognita, or A New Southerne Discoverie. A short account of Queirós' voyage and discoveries was published in English by Samuel Purchas in 1625 in Haklvytvs posthumus, or, Pvrchas his Pilgrimes, vol. iv, p. 1422–1432. This account also appears to be based on a letter by Queirós to the King in 1610, the eighth on the matter.

== See also ==
- European maritime exploration of Australia
