= Basilaki Island =

Island in Papua New Guinea

Nickname: Moresby Island
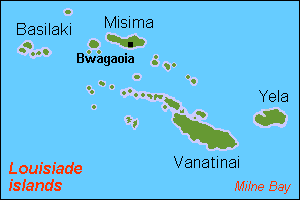
- Louisiade Archipelago, Basilaki on the top left.

- Location within Papua New Guinea

Geography
- Location: Oceania
- Coordinates: 10°37′19″S 151°00′55″E
- Archipelago: Louisiade Archipelago
- Adjacent to: Solomon Sea
- Total islands: 1
- Major islands: Basilaki
- Area: 106 km^{2} (41 sq mi)
- Length: 17 km (10.6 mi)
- Width: 10 km (6 mi)
- Coastline: 87.6 km (54.43 mi)
- Highest elevation: 531 m (1742 ft)
- Highest point: Mount Kova Sina

Administration
- Papua New Guinea
- Province: Milne Bay
- Island Group: Samarai Islands
- Island Group: Basilaki Islands
- Ward: Split
- Largest settlement: Yokowa (pop. 300)

Demographics
- Population: 1883 (2014)
- Pop. density: 18/km^{2} (47/sq mi)
- Ethnic groups: Papauans, Austronesians, Melanesians.

Additional information
- Time zone: AEST (UTC+10)
- ISO code: PG-MBA
- Official website: www.ncdc.gov.pg

Basilaki Island (Moresby Island) is an island in the Louisiade Archipelago in Milne Bay Province, Papua New Guinea. It is located at the eastern end of the New Guinea mainland.

== History ==
First recorded sighting by Europeans was by the Spanish expedition of Luís Vaez de Torres on 18 July 1606, that charted it as San Buenaventura (after Saint Bonaventure).

A party of French naturalists was believed to have been murdered in James Bay in October 1880.

This island was the scene of the murder of two sailors by natives in Hoopiron Bay, July 28, 1885. The men were Captain John Friar and John Watkins, a carpenter of Lallah Rook, a schooner registered in Saint John, New Brunswick. The vessel anchored in the bay to take on fresh water. After the murders, the crew sailed away.

The murders were revenge taken for two unpaid-for deaths of natives in Friar's employ. Despite a two-day search of the island on October 16, by the crews of Governor Blackall, and HMS Diamond and HMS Raven, the murderers were not found, although the skulls of Friar and the carpenter were recovered and given a burial at sea. Later Diamond returned and burned all the villages nearby.

Three planes were ditched off the island in 1943, a P-38H Lightning, a P-38F Lightning, and a B-24D Liberator "The Leila Belle".

== Administration ==
The island is part of the following Wards:

- Hamama, on the western part.
- Buairi, which is on Buairi island, includes a small portion of the western part.
- Habani, on the south-central area.
- Gigia, on the north-central area. (with Bwanadalu island)
- Bedauna, on the southeast area (with Kitai islands)
- Yokowa, on the northeast area.

All Wards belong to Bwanabwana Rural Local Level Government Area LLG, Samarai-Murua District, which are in Milne Bay Province.

== Geography ==
Basilaki is located on the east of Samarai Islands of the Louisiade Archipelago. The island is part of the Basilaki group. Mount Kova Sina (Fairfax) reaches a height of 531 meters (1,742 ft), and is located at the center of the island. Mount Baiaule is 444 meters (1,457 ft), and is located at the center of the island. Mount Salawie is 333 meters (1,093 ft), and is located at the south of the island.

== Demographics ==
The population of 1883 is living in 37 villages across the island. Yokowa, where the school is located, is the largest village. although, the main dock is at Habani, at the other side of the island. List of villages: Hoopiron Bay, Gaiogaiokawasi, Baiaule, Hilomai, Habani, Halahalawuwu, Salewai, Wetoa, Dauyai, Hiliki, Towina, Kawalolo, Bedauna, Mwahui, Kalotau, Taladio, Agarauna, Huba, Yokowa, Dahidahina, Siu, Pihigole, Gigia, Doba, Tanubuibuina, Delina, Tutuila, Hewoli, Hamama, Duiauna, Nuanuatieu, Gogolabia, Hakalihi, Bogala, Kalamadau, Yahala.

== Economy ==
The islanders, are farmers as opposed to eastern Louisiade Archipelago islanders. they grow Sago, Taro, and Yams for crops.

== Transportation ==
There is a dock at Habani.
