= Bwanabwana Rural LLG =

Local-level government in Papua New Guinea

- Country: Papua New Guinea
- Province: Milne Bay Province
- Time zone: UTC+10 (AEST)

Bwanabwana Rural LLG is a local-level government (LLG) of Milne Bay Province, Papua New Guinea. The LLG is situated in the western part of Louisiade Archipelago with Basilaki Island. The Bwanabwana language is spoken in the LLG.

== Wards ==
- 01. Hamama
- 02. Loani
- 03. Logea
- 04. Kwato
- 05. Tegorauan
- 06. Gotai
- 07. Dawson
- 08. Samarai East
- 09. Kwaraiwa
- 10. Sawasawaga
- 11. Anagusa
- 12. Samarai North
- 13. Tubetube
- 14. Yokowa
- 15. Gigia
- 16. Habani
- 17. Simagahi
- 18. Ware Island
- 19. Bedauna
- 20. Sideia
- 21. Kuiaro
- 22. Sekuku
- 23. Sidudu

== See also ==
- Papua New Guinea
- Outline of Papua New Guinea
- Territory of Papua and New Guinea
