= Milne Bay Province =

Province in Papua New Guinea

Milne Bay Province Milen Be Provins (Tok Pisin)
- Flag

- Milne Bay Province in Papua New Guinea
- Coordinates: 10°15′S 150°0′E
- Country: Papua New Guinea
- Capital: Alotau

Government
  - Governor: Gordon Wesley, 2022 to date

Area
  - Total: 14,345 km^{2} (5,539 sq mi)

Population (2024 census)
  - Total: 412,158
  - Density: 28.732/km^{2} (74.415/sq mi)
- Time zone: UTC+10 (AEST)
- HDI (2024): 0.580 low · 10th of 22

Milne Bay is a province of Papua New Guinea. Its capital is Alotau. The province covers 14,345 km^{2} of land and 252,990 km^{2} of sea, and within the province there are more than 600 islands, about 160 of which are inhabited. The province has about 412,158 inhabitants, speaking about 48 languages, most of which belong to the Eastern Malayo-Polynesian branch of the Austronesian language family. Economically the province is dependent upon tourism, oil palm, and gold mining on Misima Island; in addition to these larger industries there are many small-scale village projects in cocoa and copra cultivation. The World War II Battle of Milne Bay took place in the province.

Culturally the Milne Bay region is sometimes referred to as the Massim, a term originating from the name of Misima Island. Massim societies are usually characterized by matrilineal descent, elaborate mortuary sequences and complex systems of ritual exchange including the Kula ring. From island group to island group and even between close lying islands, the local culture changes remarkably. What is socially acceptable on one island may not be so on another.

== History ==
The Milne Bay Province became a major base in World War II. The Australian Armed Forces operated HMAS Ladava base that won the Battle of Milne Bay in 1942. The US Navy built a large base in Milne Bay Province, Naval Base Milne Bay.

== Geography ==
The coral reef systems of Milne Bay are some of the most biodiverse in the world, and as such attract equal attention from dive operators and conservation groups. The D'Entrecasteaux Islands still have volcanic activity, especially around Dobu and Fergusson Islands.

The waters from the Amphlett group to the Trobriand Islands are poorly charted, and, as a result, are rarely visited by tourists or yachts passing through. On the other hand, the Louissiade Archipelago is a stopover for yachts travelling around the world and ones visiting from Australia. However, the area sees few general tourists. The gold mine at Misima is no longer operational; mining there ended in 2001, with stockpile milling continuing into 2004. During its life, Misima produced over 3.7Moz of gold and 18Moz of silver. Operations now are mainly focused on mine closure requirements and environmental rehabilitation. There is also on-going prospecting in Woodlark Island and Mwatebu, Normanby Island.

=== Islands ===
Islands in Milne Bay Province include:

- The D'Entrecasteaux Islands including Goodenough (Nidula), Fergusson (Moratau), Sanaroa, Dobu and Normanby (Duau)
- The Trobriand Islands, including Kiriwina, Kaileuna, Vakuta and Kitava
- The Amphlett Islands
- Woodlark Island (Muyuw, Murua)
- Alcester Island
- The Louisiade Archipelago, including Rossell (Yela), Tagula (Sudest, Vanatinai), Misima
- Samarai, prior to the Second World War a major shipping centre for expeditions between Australia and Southeast Asia, amply described in books by Margaret Mead and her anthropologist second husband Reo Fortune, location of the colonial District Headquarters until 1969 when the new Provincial Capital was moved to Alotau
- Kwato, Deka Deka Island, Logea, Sariba, Basilaki, and Sideia
- The Engineer Islands, including Tubetube and Kwaraiwa

Administratively, there are four districts:

- Alotau District: Alotau town and mainland areas,
- Esa'ala District: Normanby, Fergusson, Dobu, Sanaroa and other islands
- Kiriwina-Goodenough District: Goodenough Island and Trobriand Islands
- Samarai-Murua District: Samarai, Engineer Islands, Louisiade Archipelago, Calvados Chain and Woodlark Island.

== Demographics ==
As of the early 20th century, Milne Bay peoples lived in small hamlets, which were dominated by clans. Most clans consisted of relatives, with an integration of adopted and individuals who married into the clan from other clans. Relocation of hamlets was commons, where one, two or three hamlets might combine and relocate together. The culture was matrilineal. Each clan had a totem animal it identified as its own. Totems included snakes, a lizard, a fish, or a bird. One clan, the Tubetube clan, had a non-animal, with a plant as its totem. The snake was identified as one of the most powerful of the totems, as is the bird. People were known for asking "what is your bird?" in reference to what clan someone was a member of. Clans did not build shrines to represent their totems, and people didn't believe to have special power or influence over the animals representing their totems. As of 1904, people were occasionally maintaining the creatures representing their clans as pets, which may have been introduced by Europeans. Bird totem creatures are not considered food.

Historically, community members practiced exogamy, which protected clan members from having sexual relations with members of the same clan.

== Arts and culture ==
Wood carving, historically, has been an important art of the Milne Bay area. The Milne Bay peoples created canoes, called waga. When Charles Gabriel Seligman visited the area in 1904, he described the waga as playing "such an important part in the life of the district," and being a "decorative art" that has "reached its highest expression in the carvings of the ornaments for the prows of the waga." He also noted that they used similar designs on gourds from lime trees.

Basket weaving was also common, with baskets called sinapopo being particularly representative of wealth in the region, to the point where they are buried with their owners upon death. Pottery was also common, specifically amongst the Tubetube, Ware and other tribes. Adze and axes were also common, for functional and ceremonial purposes. The people of Woodlark Island were known for their axes. Spears and arrows were also used for weapons.

== Governance ==
=== Districts and LLGs ===
Each province in Papua New Guinea has one or more districts, and each district has one or more Local Level Government (LLG) areas. For census purposes, the LLG areas are subdivided into wards and those into census units. The 2025 election saw the number of LLGs increase from 16 to 18.

District	District Capital	LLG Name
Alotau District	Alotau	Alotau Urban
Alotau District	Alotau	Daga Rural
Alotau District	Alotau	Huhu Rural
Alotau District	Alotau	Makamaka Rural
Alotau District	Alotau	Maramatana Rural
Alotau District	Alotau	Suau Rural
Alotau District	Alotau	Weraura Rural
Esa'ala District	Esa'ala	Dobu Rural
Esa'ala District	Esa'ala	Duau Rural
Esa'ala District	Esa'ala	West Ferguson
Kiriwina-Goodenough District	Kiriwina	Goodenough Island Rural
Kiriwina-Goodenough District	Kiriwina	Kiriwina Rural
Samarai-Murua District	Murua	Bwanabwana Rural
Samarai-Murua District	Murua	Louisiade Rural
Samarai-Murua District	Murua	Murua Rural
Samarai-Murua District	Murua	Yaleyamba Rural

== Provincial leaders ==
The province was governed by a decentralised provincial administration, headed by a Premier, from 1978 to 1995. Following reforms taking effect that year, the national government reassumed some powers, and the role of Premier was replaced by a position of Governor, to be held by the winner of the province-wide seat in the National Parliament of Papua New Guinea.

=== Premiers (1978–1995) ===
Premier	Term
Patrick Paulisbo	1978–1981
John Tubira	1981–1982
Lepani Watson	1983–1986
Navy Aule	1987–1989
Elliot Kaidama	1989–1991
Jeffrey Toloube	1991–1992
provincial government suspended	1992–1993
Jeffrey Toloube	1993–1994
Jones Liosi	1994–1995

=== Governors (1995–present) ===
Governor	Term
Tim Neville	1995–1997
Josephine Abaijah	1997–2000
Titus Philemon	2000–2002
Tim Neville	2002–2007
John Luke Crittin	2007–2012
Titus Philemon	2012–2017
Sir John Luke Crittin, KBE	2017–2022
Gordon Wesley	2022–present

== Members of the National Parliament ==
The province and each district is represented by a Member of the National Parliament. There is one provincial electorate and each district is an open electorate.

Electorate	Name
Milne Bay Provincial	Gordon Wesley
Alotau Open	Ricky Morris
Esa'ala Open	Jimmy Maladina
Kiriwina-Goodenough Open	Douglas Tomuriesa
Samarai-Murua Open	Isi Henry Leonard

== Popular culture ==
Miriam Kahn's Always Hungry Never Greedy: food and the expression of gender in a Melanesian society is set in a village in Milne Bay.

== See also ==
- Ward Hunt Strait
- Dart Reefs
