= ISO 3166-2:PG =

Entry for French Papua New Guinea in ISO 3166-2

ISO 3166-2:PG is the entry for Papua New Guinea in ISO 3166-2, part of the ISO 3166 standard published by the International Organization for Standardization (ISO), which defines codes for the names of the principal subdivisions (e.g., provinces or states) of all countries coded in ISO 3166-1.

Currently for Papua New Guinea, ISO 3166-2 codes are defined for one district, 20 provinces and one autonomous region. The capital of the country Port Moresby forms the National Capital District and has special status equal to the provinces.

Each code consists of two parts separated by a hyphen. The first part is PG, the ISO 3166-1 alpha-2 code of Papua New Guinea. The second part is three letters.

== Current codes ==
Subdivision names are listed as in the ISO 3166-2 standard published by the ISO 3166 Maintenance Agency (ISO 3166/MA).

Click on the button in the header to sort each column.

Code	Subdivision name (en)	Subdivision name (tpi) (Note: For reference only, Tok Pisin name not included in the ISO standard.)	Subdivision category
PG-NSB	Bougainville	Bogenvil	autonomous region
PG-CPM	Central	Sentral	province
PG-CPK	Chimbu	Simbu	province
PG-EBR	East New Britain	Is Niu Briten	province
PG-ESW	East Sepik	Is Sepik	province
PG-EHG	Eastern Highlands	Isten Hailans	province
PG-EPW	Enga	Enga	province
PG-GPK	Gulf	Galf	province
PG-HLA	Hela	Hela	province
PG-JWK	Jiwaka	Jiwaka	province
PG-MPM	Madang	Madang	province
PG-MRL	Manus	Manus	province
PG-MBA	Milne Bay	Milen Be	province
PG-MPL	Morobe	Morobe	province
PG-NCD	National Capital District (Port Moresby)	Pot Mosbi	district
PG-NIK	New Ireland	Niu Ailan	province
PG-NPP	Northern	Oro	province
PG-SHM	Southern Highlands	Sauten Hailans	province
PG-WBK	West New Britain	Wes Niu Briten	province
PG-SAN	West Sepik	Sandaun	province
PG-WPD	Western	Westen	province
PG-WHM	Western Highlands	Westen Hailans	province

== Changes ==
The following changes to the entry have been announced by the ISO 3166/MA since the first publication of ISO 3166-2 in 1998. ISO stopped issuing newsletters in 2013.

Newsletter	Date issued	Description of change in newsletter	Code/Subdivision change
Newsletter II-3	2011-12-13 (corrected 2011-12-15)	Administrative readjustment, local generic administrative term addition and source list and source code update.	Codes: PG-NSA North Solomons (province) → PG-NSB Bougainville (autonomous region)
Online Browsing; Platform (OBP)	2013-05-10	UN notification of full name	
Online Browsing; Platform (OBP)	2014-03-03	Add "the" before the English full name	
Online Browsing; Platform (OBP)	2014-11-03	Add two provinces PG-HLA and PG-JWK; change subdivision name of PG-SAN; update List Source	Subdivisions added: PG-HLA Hela; PG-JWK Jiwaka; Name changed: PG-SAN Sandaun [West Sepik] → West Sepik

== See also ==
- Subdivisions of Papua New Guinea
- FIPS region codes of Papua New Guinea
- Neighbouring country: ID
