= Samarai-Murua District =

- Location within Papua New Guinea
- Coordinates: 10.582°S 150.656°E
- Country: Papua New Guinea
- Province: Milne Bay Province
- Capital: Murua

Area
  - Total: 3,081 km^{2} (1,190 sq mi)

Population (2011 census)
  - Total: 58,590
  - Density: 19.02/km^{2} (49.25/sq mi)
- Time zone: UTC+10 (AEST)

Samarai-Murua District is a district of the Milne Bay Province of Papua New Guinea. Its capital is Murua. The population of the district was 58,590 at the 2011 census.

The district derives its name from the islands of Samarai and Woodlark Island, the latter also being called Murua.
