= Clash =

Clash or The Clash may refer to:

== Culture ==
=== Events ===
- Busch Light Clash, a motor racing event
- Clash of the Champions, a National Wrestling Alliance and World Championship Wrestling event
- WWE Clash of Champions, a WWE event

=== Music ===
- Clash cymbals, a musical instrument
- Sound clash, a battle between two bands
- Clash (magazine), a British music magazine
- "Clash", a 2012 song by Caravan Palace from Panic
- "Clash", a 2020 song by Diljit Dosanjh from G.O.A.T.
- "Clash" (song), a 2021 song by British rapper Dave
- "Clash" or "Clashes", terms used to refer to Battle rap between a pair

==== Bands ====
- The Clash, an English punk rock band
- Clash (band), a Thai rock band, from Bangkok
- The Clash at Demonhead, fictional band listed in List of Scott Pilgrim characters

==== Albums ====
- The Clash (album), the 1977 titular album
- Clash (Holger Czukay and Dr. Walker album), 1997
- Kardi Gras, Vol. 1: The Clash, by Kardinal Offishall, 2015

=== Video games ===
- Clash (video game), 1998 turn-based strategy game for MS-DOS and Microsoft Windows
- Battle Clash, 1992 Super NES light gun shooter
- Mario Clash, 1995 Virtual Boy game
- Clash of Clans, 2012 mobile game
- Clash Royale, 2016 spinoff of Clash of Clans
- Clash at Demonhead, 1989 NES game
- What the Clash?, 2025 humor game

=== Television ===
- Clash!, a 1990 game show, aired until 1991, on Comedy Central
- The Clash (TV program), a Philippine reality show on GMA Network
- "Clash" (Justice League Unlimited episode), 2005
- "Clash" (Star Wars: Young Jedi Adventures), an episode of Star Wars: Young Jedi Adventures

=== Film ===
- Clash (2009 film), a Vietnamese film
- Clash (2016 film), an Egyptian film
- Clash (2021 film), a Nigerian film

=== Other uses in culture ===
- Clash (novel), a 1929 novel by Ellen Wilkinson
- Kevin Clash (born 1960), a puppeteer who performs the muppet Elmo
- Attribute clash, a color graphics artifact predominantly on the ZX Spectrum
- Clash (comics), a Marvel comics character associated with Spider-Man

=== Multiple entries ===
- Clash of the Titans (disambiguation)
- Clash of the Gods (disambiguation)

== Other uses ==
- A small battle
- Cluster Lensing And Supernova survey with Hubble (CLASH)
- Darnell Clash (born 1962), an American football player
- Kevin Clash (born 1960), an American puppeteer, director and producer
- The Clash of Civilizations, a 1996 controversial sociological theory advocated by Samuel P. Huntington
- Clash (app), an American short-form video hosting service and social network
- Clash (V2Ray), an extension package delivered from V2Ray

== See also ==
- Conflict (disambiguation)
