= Conflict =

Conflict may refer to:

== Social sciences ==
- Conflict (process), the general pattern of groups dealing with disparate ideas
- Conflict continuum from cooperation (low intensity), to contest, to higher intensity (violence and war)
- Conflict of interest, involvement in multiple interests which could possibly corrupt the motivation or decision-making
- Cultural conflict, a type of conflict that occurs when different cultural values and beliefs clash
- Ethnic conflict, a conflict between two or more contending ethnic groups
- Group conflict, conflict between groups
- Intragroup conflict, conflict within groups
- Organizational conflict, discord caused by opposition of needs, values, and interests between people working together
- Role conflict, incompatible demands placed upon a person such that compliance with both would be difficult
- Social conflict, the struggle for agency or power in something
- Work–family conflict, incompatible demands between the work and family roles of an individual

== Military ==
- Violence
- Armed conflict, often known as war

== Arts, entertainment, and media ==
- Conflict (narrative), a core literary element

== Engineering ==
- Conflict (air traffic control), a loss of separation between two aircraft
- Conflict (revision control), a computer problem wherein multiple editors attempt to edit the same document

== As a proper noun ==
=== Military ===
- HMS Conflict, a list of ships with the name
  - HMS Conflict (1873), a schooner launched in 1873 and sold in 1882
  - HMS Conflict (1894), a Conflict-class destroyer launched in 1894 and sold in 1920

=== Arts, entertainment, and media ===
==== Films ====
- Conflict (1921 film), an American silent film directed by Stuart Paton
- Conflict (1936 film), an American boxing film starring John Wayne
- Conflict (1937 film), a Swedish drama film directed by Per-Axel Branner
- Conflict (1938 film), a French drama film directed by Léonide Moguy
- Conflict (1945 film), an American suspense film starring Humphrey Bogart
- Judith (1966 film) or Conflict, a film starring Sophia Loren
- Samna (film) or The Conflict, a 1974 Indian Marathi-language film
- Samar (1999 film) or Conflict, a 1999 Indian film by Shyam Benegal
- Conflicted (film), 2021 American film

==== Games ====
- Conflict (series), a 2002–2008 series of war games for the PS2, Xbox, and PC
- Conflict (video game), a 1989 Nintendo Entertainment System war game
- Conflict: Middle East Political Simulator, a 1990 strategy computer game

==== Literature, theatre and periodicals ====
- Conflict (novel), a 1934 novel by E.V. Timms
- Conflict, an underground art fanzine by Gerard Cosloy
- Conflict, an adventure pulp magazine from 1933 to 1934 that published a story by Margie Harris
- Conflict, a wargame magazine that included board wargames
- Conflict (play), a 1925 play by Miles Malleson

==== Music ====
- Conflict (band), an anarcho-punk band
- Conflict (Sy Smith album), a 2008 R&B album
- Conflict (Jimmy Woods album), a 1963 jazz album
- Conflict (Steeleye Span album), 2025
- "Conflict", a song by Disturbed from the 2000 album The Sickness

==== Television ====
- Catholics (ITV Sunday Night Theatre), a 1973 television play
- Conflict (1978 TV series), a TVB television series
- Conflict (American TV series), a 1956 American television series
- "Conflict" (UFO), the fourth episode aired of the first series of UFO
- Conflict (Finnish TV series), also known as Konflikti, a 2024 Finnish-American TV miniseries

== See also ==
- Clash (disambiguation)
- Conflict resolution
- Confrontation (disambiguation)
- Struggle (disambiguation)
