= HMS Osprey =

Five ships and a shore establishment of the Royal Navy have borne the name HMS Osprey, after the bird of prey the Osprey:

Ships

- HMS Osprey (1797) was an 18-gun Cruizer-class brig-sloop launched in 1797 and broken up in 1813.
- HMS Osprey (1844) was a 12-gun brig launched in 1844 and wrecked in 1846.
- HMS Osprey (1856) was a Vigilant-class wooden screw gunvessel launched in 1856 and wrecked in 1867.
- HMS Osprey (1876) was an Osprey-class composite screw sloop launched in 1876 and sold in 1890.
- HMS Osprey (1897) was a Gipsy-class destroyer launched in 1897 and sold in 1919.

Shore establishments

- HMS Osprey, Portland was an anti-submarine training establishment established at Portland between 1924 and 1941, when its functions were transferred to Dunoon. HMS Osprey was at Dunoon until 1946, the name also being allocated to a smaller base established at Belfast in 1943. Osprey recommissioned at Portland in 1946, became a base in 1948 and was closed in 1995.
- RNAS Portland (HMS Osprey) was an air station of the Royal Navy, situated at Portland, established in 1917. From 1959 the station shared the name HMS Osprey with the anti-submarine shore-based establishment located at East Weares, which used the air station's helicopters for research and development in anti-submarine techniques. It closed in 1999.
