= HMS Clyde =

Ten ships of the Royal Navy have been named HMS Clyde after the River Clyde that runs through the city of Glasgow, Scotland. For His Majesty's Naval Base Clyde see HMNB Clyde.

- HMS Clyde (1796) was a 38-gun fifth rate launched in 1796 and sold in 1814.
- HMS Clyde (1805) was a 4-gun tender purchased in 1805 and sold in 1826.
- HMS Clyde (1828) was a 46-gun fifth rate launched in 1828. She became a drill ship for the Royal Naval Reserve in 1870, and was sold in 1904.
- HMS Clyde (1859) was a wooden screw gunboat launched in 1859, used a survey vessel from 1872 and sold in 1875.
- HMS Clyde (1900) was a paddle vessel launched in 1900 and wrecked in 1951.
- HMS Clyde was an Osprey-class screw sloop launched as HMS Wild Swan in 1876, converted to a base ship and renamed HMS Clyde in 1904, renamed HMS Columbine in 1912 and sold in 1920.
- HMS Clyde was a River-class submarine launched in 1934 and sold in 1946.
- HMS Clyde was a Ton-class coastal minesweeper launched in 1953 as HMS Crichton. She was renamed HMS Clyde between 1954 and 1961.
- HMS Clyde was a Ton-class coastal minesweeper launched in 1953 as HMS Amerton, renamed HMS Clyde in 1960 and broken up in 1971.
- HMS Clyde (P257) was a modified River-class patrol vessel launched in 2006, and decommissioned in 2020 to be transferred to the Royal Bahrain Naval Force.

== See also ==
- SS River Clyde
