= The Struggle =

The Struggle may refer to:

- The Struggle (political organization), a Marxist political organization in Pakistan

== Music ==
- The Struggle (Tenth Avenue North album), 2012
- The Struggle (Cappadonna album), 2003
- "The Struggle", a hidden track by 30 Seconds to Mars from the self-titled debut album
- "The Struggle", a song by Eddy Grant from Reparation
- "The Struggle", a song by Scroobius Pip on Distraction Pieces
- "The Struggle", a song by Tove Lo from Blue Lips

== Literature ==
- "The Struggle", an alternative title for "Say Not the Struggle Naught Availeth", a poem by Arthur Hugh Clough
- Struggle, the newsletter of the Southern Africa Support Project

== Film ==
- The Struggle, D. W. Griffith's final film, 1931
- Chennakesava Reddy, a 2002 Indian Telugu-language film by V. V. Vinayak, released in Hindi as Sangharsh: The Struggle

== See also ==
- Struggle (disambiguation)
