= Irai =

Irai may refer to:

- Irai, Orne, France
- Irai Dam, India
- Irai Island, Papua New Guinea
- Iraí, Brazil
- Iraí de Minas, Brazil
- Irai (web series), a 2022 Indian web series
