= Struggle =

Struggle may refer to:

== Film and television ==
- Struggle (2003 film), an Austrian drama film
- Struggle (2013 film), a Chinese teen film
- Struggle: The Life and Lost Art of Szukalski, a 2018 Polish/American documentary film
- Struggle (TV series), a 2007 Chinese series

== Music ==
=== Albums ===
- Struggle (Nonpoint album) or the title song, 1999
- Struggle (Woody Guthrie album), 1990
- Struggle, by Six Feet Deep, 1994

=== Songs ===
- "Struggle", by Ashanti from The Declaration, 2008
- "Struggle", by Jay Chou from Common Jasmine Orange, 2004
- "Struggle", by Keith Richards from Talk Is Cheap, 1988
- "Struggle", by Paul McCartney from New, 2014 collector's edition
- "Struggle", by Radio 4 from Gotham!, 2002
- "Struggle", by Tove Lo from Blue Lips, 2017

== Other uses ==
- Struggle, a novel by Shi Kang
- Struggle, a newsletter of the Southern Africa Support Project
- Struggle Jennings, William Curtis Harness Jr. (born 1980), American rapper
- Greek War of Independence, referred to by Greeks in the 19th century as the Αγώνας, Agonas, "Struggle"

== See also ==
- The Struggle (disambiguation)
- Conflict (disambiguation)
