= Panasesa Island =

Island in Papua New Guinea

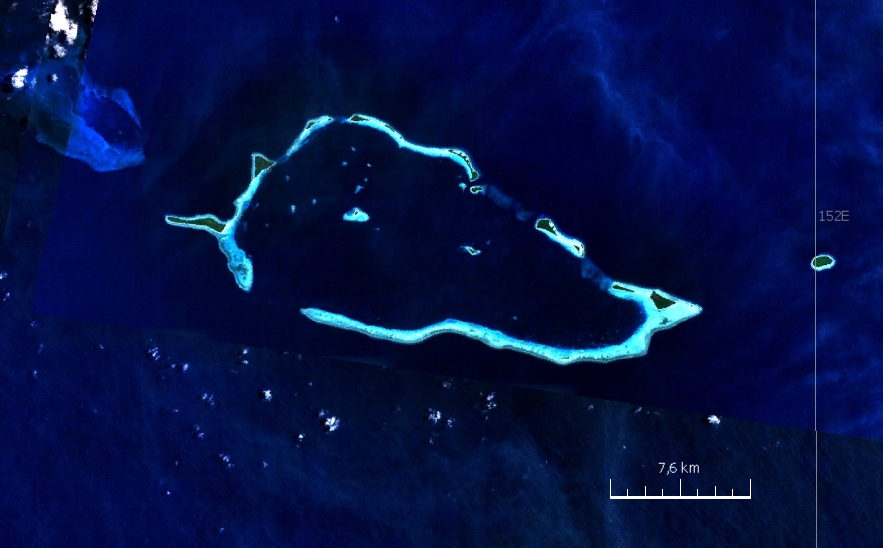
- Satellite image of Conflict Group atoll.

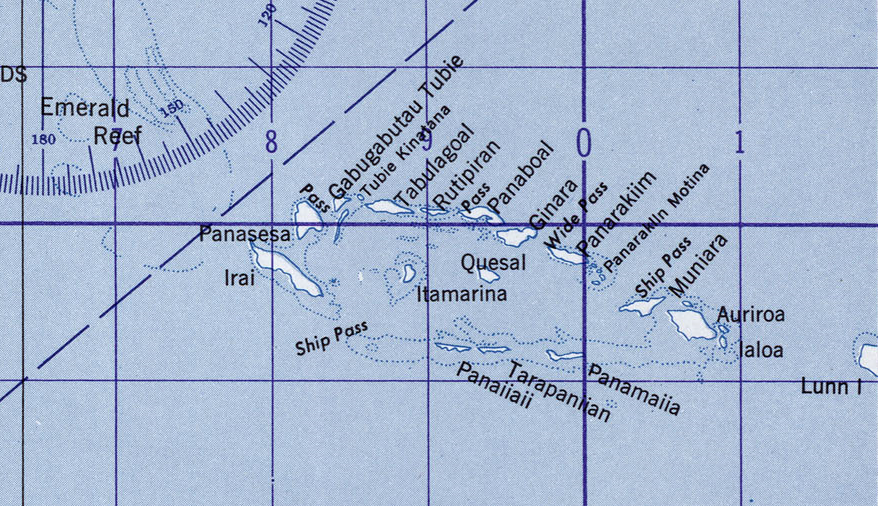
- Panasesa Island on Conflict Group atoll map.

- Location of the Panasesa Island

Geography
- Location: Oceania
- Coordinates: 10°44′24″S 151°43′30″E
- Archipelago: Louisiade Archipelago
- Adjacent to: Solomon Sea
- Total islands: 1
- Area: 0.66 km^{2} (0.25 sq mi)
- Length: 1.2 km (0.75 mi)
- Width: 1 km (0.6 mi)
- Highest elevation: 8 m (26 ft)
- Highest point: 18

Administration
- Papua New Guinea
- Province: Milne Bay
- District: Samarai-Murua District
- LLG: Bwanabwana Rural LLG
- Island Group: Calvados Chain
- Largest settlement: Irai (pop. 20)

Additional information
- Time zone: AEST (UTC+10)
- ISO code: PG-MBA
- Official website: www.ncdc.gov.pg

Panasesa Island is located in Milne Bay Province, Papua New Guinea, 500 km to the east of Port Moresby, the nation's capital. Panasesa Island has an eco resort with small staff.

== Geography ==
Panasesa Island is part of Conflict Group atoll in Louisiade Archipelago. It is situated just north of larger Irai Island. The land of Island is flat. The highest point on the island is 18 meters above sea level. It covers about 1.2 km from the north to the south and 1.0 km from the east to the west.

Due to island location tropical weather prevails.
