= Port Walter =

Body of water in southeastern Alaska

Port Walter, Alaska
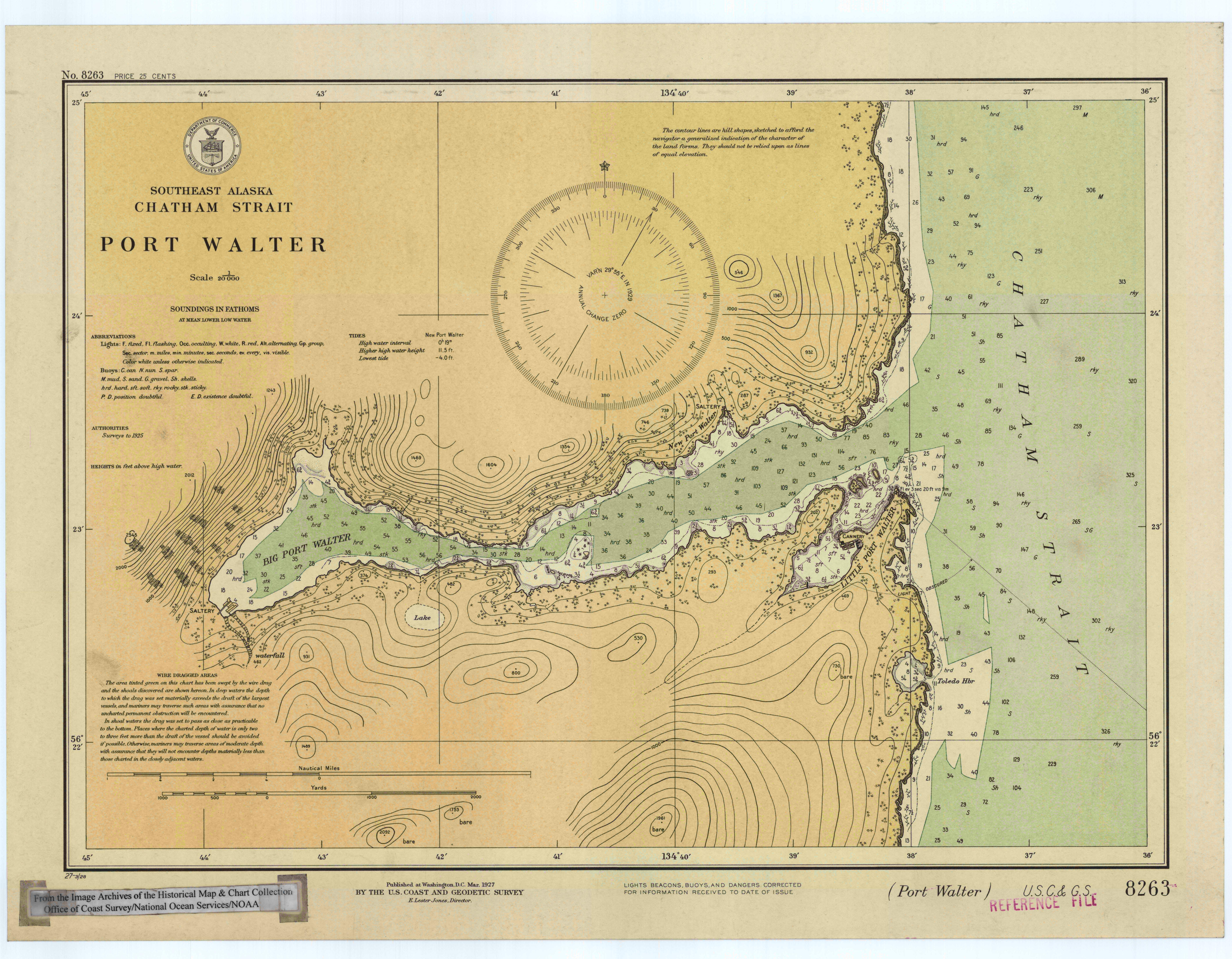
- 1927 chart of Port Walter

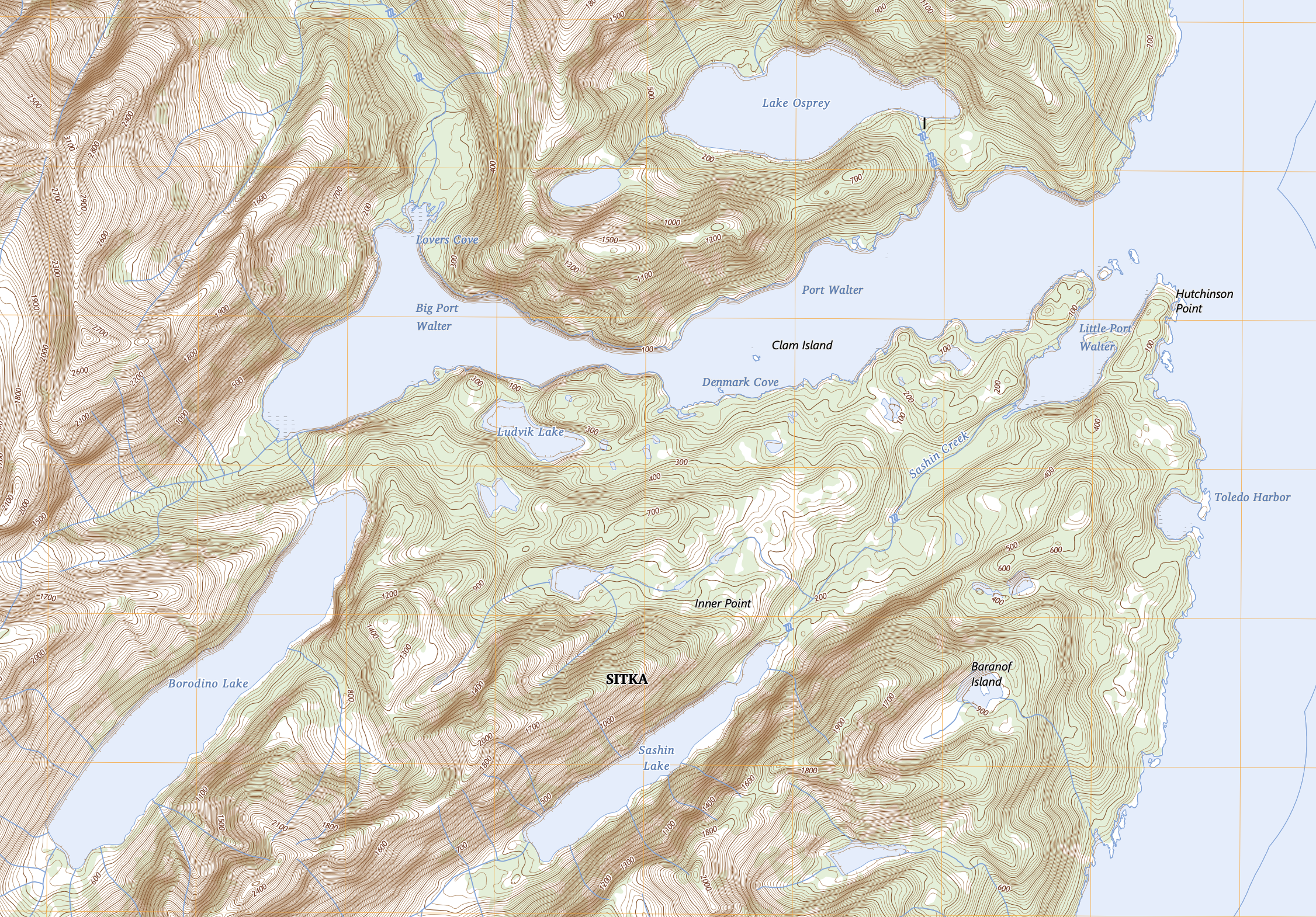
- Topographic map of Port Walter area

- Location within Alaska
- Location: Baranof Island, Alaska
- Coordinates: 56°23′30″N 134°39′23″W

Port Walter is located on the southeastern coast of Baranof Island in Sitka City and Borough, Alaska. It is a body of water with two main arms, Little Port Walter and Big Port Walter. The land surrounding Port Walter is part of the Tongass National Forest. In the first half of the twentieth century it hosted three major seafood processing plants, producing primarily herring and salmon for human and animal consumption, fish oil, and fertilizer. In 1917 there were 375 men and women working at the Port Walter processing plants.

Little Port Walter is the site of the National Oceanographic and Atmospheric Administration's Little Port Walter Research Station. This facility was established in 1934 and is the oldest year-round biological research station in Alaska.

== Geography ==
Port Walter is a glacially-carved fjord in semischistose Sitka graywacke rock on the southeast coast of Baranof Island. It opens into Chatham Strait on its east. The main arm of Port Walter, tends roughly west from its opening to the sea. It consists of an outer bay and inner bay, also known as Big Port Walter, joined by a narrow channel. A smaller arm, Little Port Walter, tends to the southwest. It also has an outer and inner bay joined by a narrow channel.

Various features around the shore of Port Walter have been given official or common names. The southern point of its entrance from Chatham Strait is Hutchinson Point. New Port Walter is an inlet where the outflow from Lake Osprey empties into the main arm. Lover's Cove is an inlet on the north side of the inner bay, while Denmark cove is a dent on the south side of the outer bay.

The fjord is surrounded by steep-sided hills that rise over 2,000 feet (610 m) within a mile of the bay in some places. Borodino Lake, Lake Osprey, Ludvik Lake, and Sashin Lake on the heights above all drain into Port Walter. In the case of Borodino Lake, this takes the form of a dramatic waterfall at the head of Big Port Walter. So much fresh water flows into the inner bay of the main arm that it may freeze to a depth of ten feet in the winter.

Recent settlement has been focused in four areas. The Big Port Walter processing plant was at the head of the main arm. The Little Port Walter Research Station is in a small cove on the north shore of the inner bay of Little Port Walter. The fish processing plant in Little Port Walter was in a cove on the east shore of the inner bay. The New Port Walter plant was built at the inlet of the same name.

== History ==
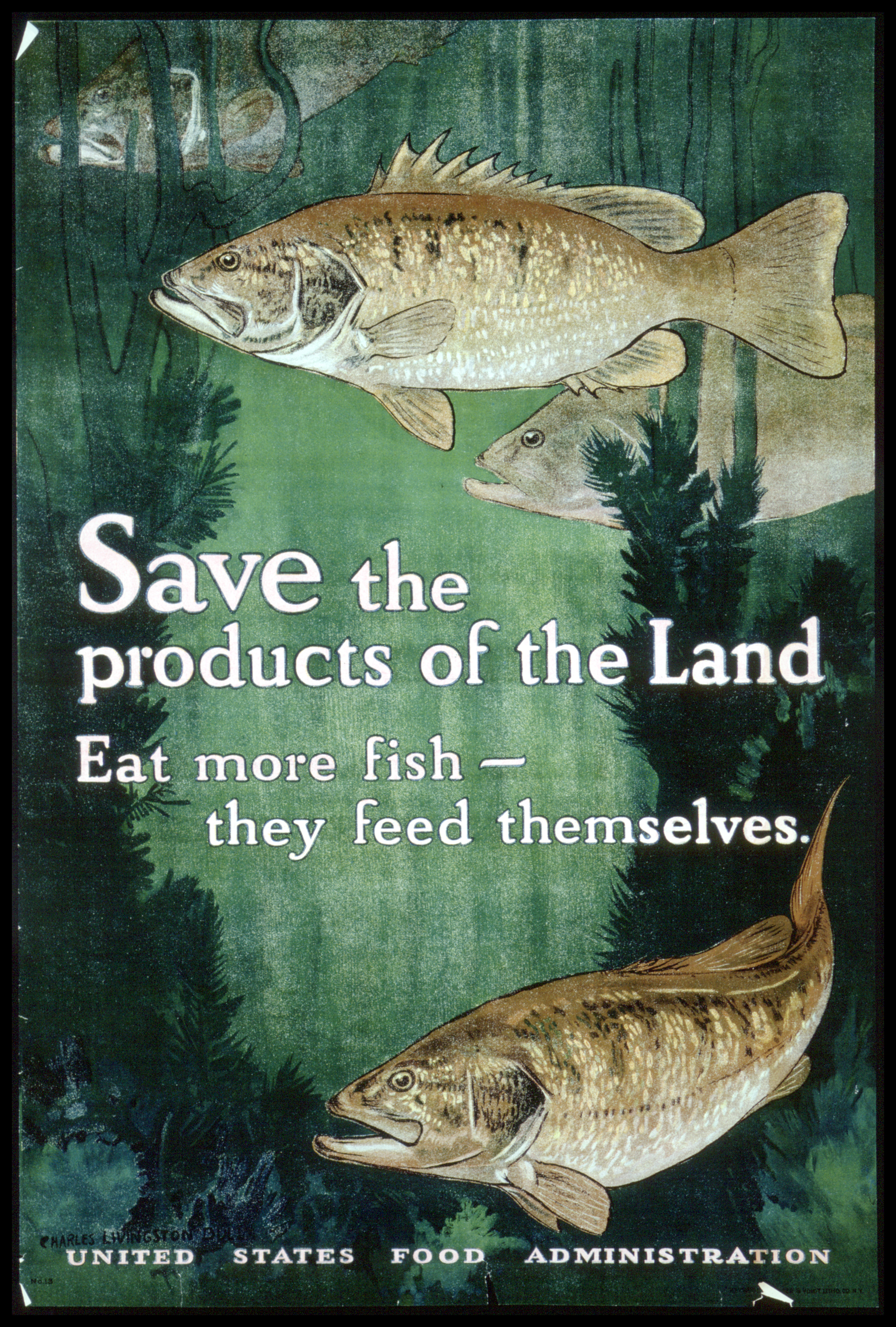
This 1917 poster was part of the government effort which drove the cannery boom at Port Walter

It is a certainty that Tlingit natives knew and used Port Walter long before contact with Europeans. Regrettably, the history of this period is lost. Given Tlingit involvement in fisheries throughout Southeast Alaska, it is likely that natives both fished for and worked in the fish processing plants in Port Walter.

Among the earliest written references to Port Walter is found in the 1901 United States Coast Pilot. It was described as having a good anchorage, suggesting regular use by local mariners. The Bureau of Lighthouses established a 10-candlepower fixed red light on a wooden scaffold 20 feet tall on the northern entrance to Port Walter in 1914. In November 1918 this light was upgraded from a fixed to flashing light, and from an oil-wick to acetylene gas light of 130-candlepower. The investment in aids to navigation also suggests that Port Walter was used as a harbor before any permanent settlement occurred.

World War I reduced global food supplies as fields were destroyed in the fighting, millions of farmers left their land, tons of agricultural products from the United States bound for Europe were sunk by U-boats, and poor weather reduced harvests. Prices rose in the face of scarcity and food riots broke out in New York, Philadelphia, and other cities. Germany faced starvation. Prices for Alaska's seafood rose, and the U.S. government placed large orders for canned fish to supply its army in Europe. The seafood industry in Alaska responded by making large investments in new canneries, salteries, fish oil, and fish meal plants. Nine new plants were built in Southeast Alaska in 1916 and 1917, including two in Port Walter.

The seasonal influx of hundreds of cannery workers at the new plants produced a significant community at Port Walter. A. U.S. post office was established at Little Port Walter in 1918. Elections were administered and dances were held. Standard Oil opened a fuel and lubricant distribution station. Electricity was abundant since the plants had hydropower from the lakes in the hills above. Each cannery had its own fleet of tenders to bring supplies in and take finished products to market. The Big Port Walter plant had five tenders in 1919, Einar Beyer, Fanshaw, Petrel, Shamrock II, and Shamrock III, while one of the Little Port Walter's tenders, Apex, was large enough to deliver 24,000 cases of canned salmon to Anacortes. Another of Big Port Walters tenders, Fern, was a former lighthouse tender. Between the cannery tenders and the fishermen bringing their catch to the plants, Port Walter was a busy harbor.

At the end of World War I, government contracts were cancelled, and previously purchased fish was returned. Faced with overcapacity, the industry shrank rapidly. The Little Port Walter cannery closed permanently in 1925. After years of sporadic production, the New Port Walter plant closed in 1937, and the Big Port Walter facility closed in 1966.

The same abundance of fish that caused the canneries to site their plants in Port Walter, also brought a Bureau of Fisheries research station in Little Port Walter in 1934. This facility is now the only occupied site in Port Walter.

=== Big Port Walter ===
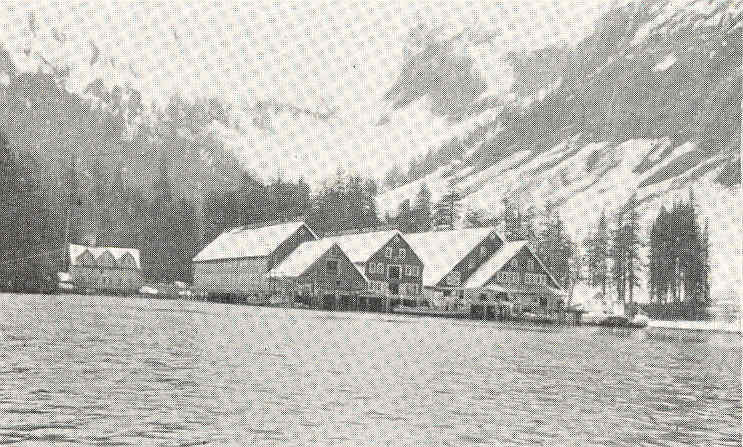
1920 view of Southern Alaska Canning Co. facility at Big Port Walter

==== Alaska Pacific Herring Company and successors (1917-1966) ====
In February 1917 the Alaska Pacific Herring Company let a contract for 20,000 feet of piling and wharf at the head of Big Port Walter. The construction plan for that spring included not only the wharf, but also three 40' by 100' cold storage buildings, a 40' by 100' sorting building, a 36' by 100' cannery building, a power house, store, superintend's home, and separate dormitories for white and oriental workers. The motive force for this effort was the Norwegian-American community. Eigil Buschmann, son of Petersburg founder Peter Buschmann, was instrumental in planning the facility and became its superintendent. Einar Beyer, an investor in the shipping and fisheries businesses, provided the funding. Beyer put his nephew, Hakkon Beyer Friele, in charge of the plant in 1917.

The Alaska Pacific Herring Company was acquired by the Southern Alaska Canning Company in 1919 which had the effect of combining the assets of the Big Port Walter plant with other operations owned by Einar Beyer and Eigil Buschmann. In 1920 a fish meal and fish oil reduction system produced by California Press Manufacturing Company was installed at the plant.

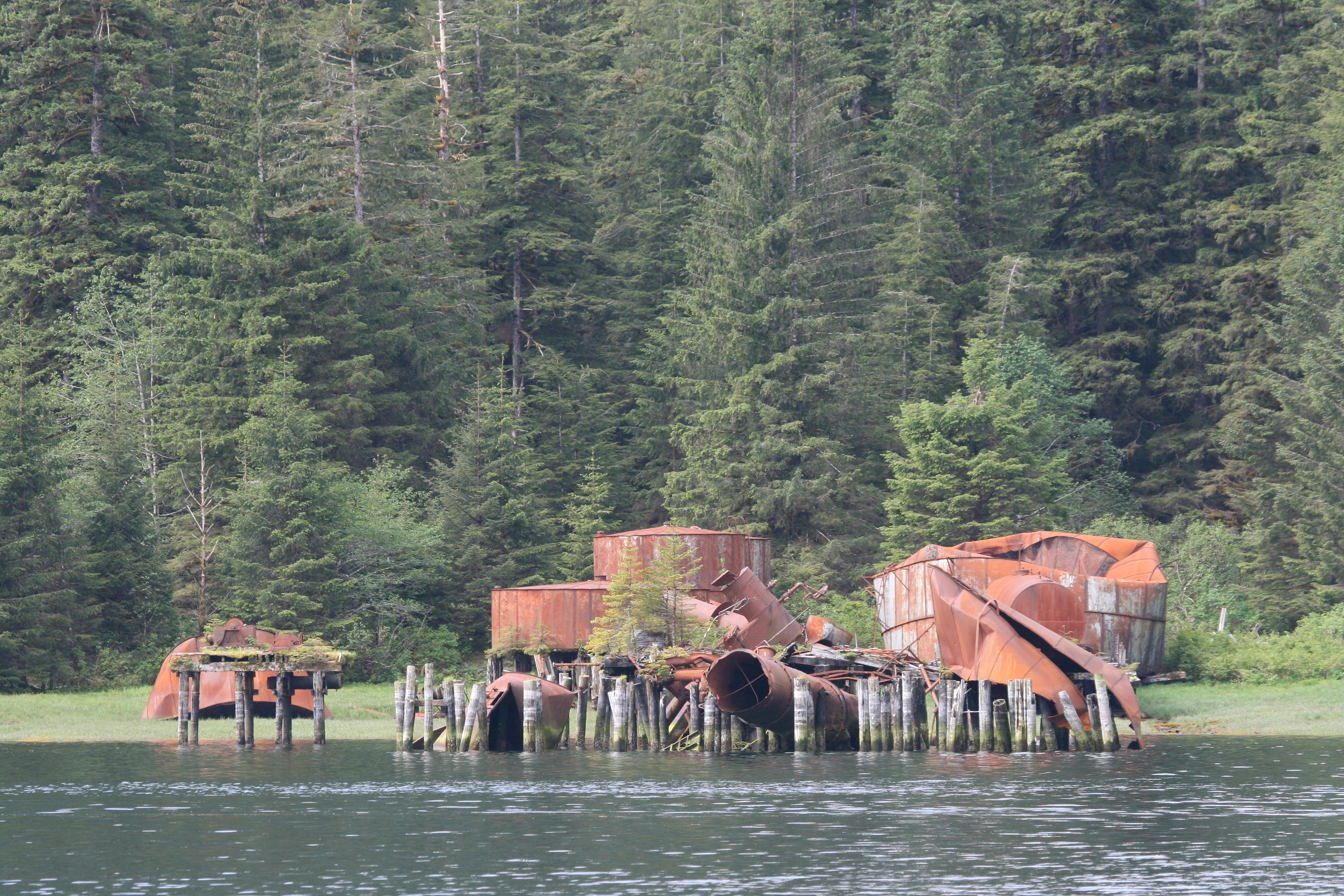
Remains of Big Port Walter Plant in 2007

In 1921 the Big Port Walter plant was leased and operated by Elling Arentsen and Andrew Buchan. In 1922 the partners split and Arenstsen operated the plant as E. Arentsen & Co. Southern Alaska Canning Company fell into bankruptcy by 1924 without involving the Big Port Arthur plant, suggesting that Arentsen bought the facility in 1922 or 1923. He experienced boom years, such as 1934 when the plant shut down for lack of storage for the large catch, to bust years, such as 1940-1944 when there were no operations at all due to World War II. Arentsen remained actively involved in the Big Port Walter facility until retiring in 1940. Elling's son, Harold A. Arentsen, took over the Big Port Walter plant in 1940. The company went bankrupt and its assets were sold by the U.S. Marshal Service in August 1954.

Wilbur-Ellis Company, a San Francisco corporation in the fish meal and fish oil business, bought the plant at the Marshal's sale in 1954. It operated it through 1958 when it sold its interest to Edible Herring Products, Inc. When the plant closed on August 30, 1966, it was the last herring reduction facility in Southeast Alaska. The company went bankrupt in 1968 and abandoned the Big Port Walter plant. It left behind 45,000 gallons of contaminated oil in two rusting tanks which sat on rotting pilings, a major pollution risk. The U.S. Forest Service and Standard Oil cooperated to remove this oil in December 1972.

==== Chatham Straits Fish Company (1919-1937) ====
Construction of the hydroelectric dam at New Port Walter began in 1919, and the Chatham Straits Fish Company produced its first barrels of pickled herring that year. In 1926 the company installed a new herring reduction plant to produce fish meal and oil that was the largest in Alaska at the time. New tanks were installed giving the plant storage capacity for 65,00 gallons of fish oil. This processor remained in operation until 1931. Thereafter, the plant operated sporadically, its last season of packing in 1937. In 1939 the Chatham Straits Fish Company bought the cannery at Zachar Bay on Kodiak Island and moved the herring reduction machinery at New Port Walter there.

Newport Fisheries, Inc. was granted a license for a dam and power plant at New Port Walter in February 1950, presumably with the intention of opening a plant there, but there is no evidence that this occurred.

In 2002 as much as 600 gallons of bunker oil spilled into the water when a seam split on an old tank at the abandoned processing plant at New Port Walter.

=== Little Port Walter ===
==== Alaska Herring and Sardine Company (1916-1927) ====
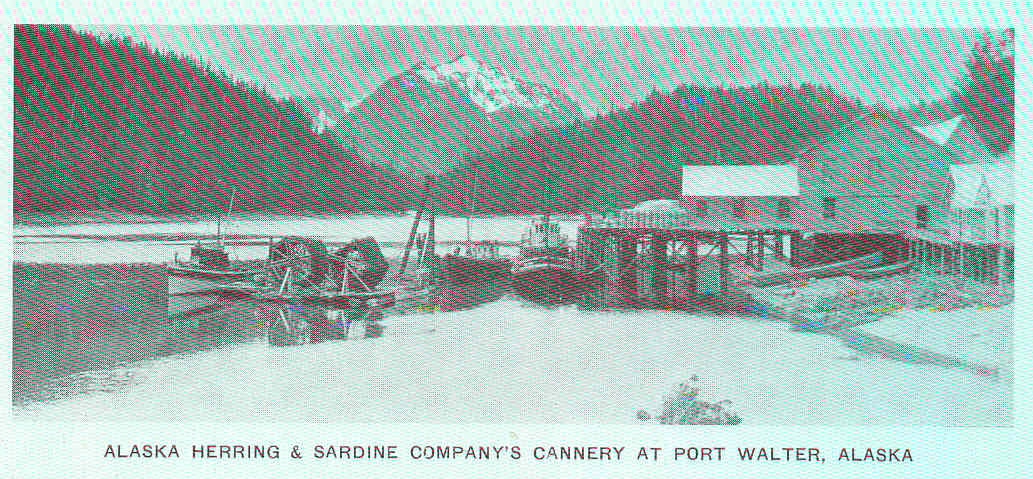
1917 view of Little Port Walter plant

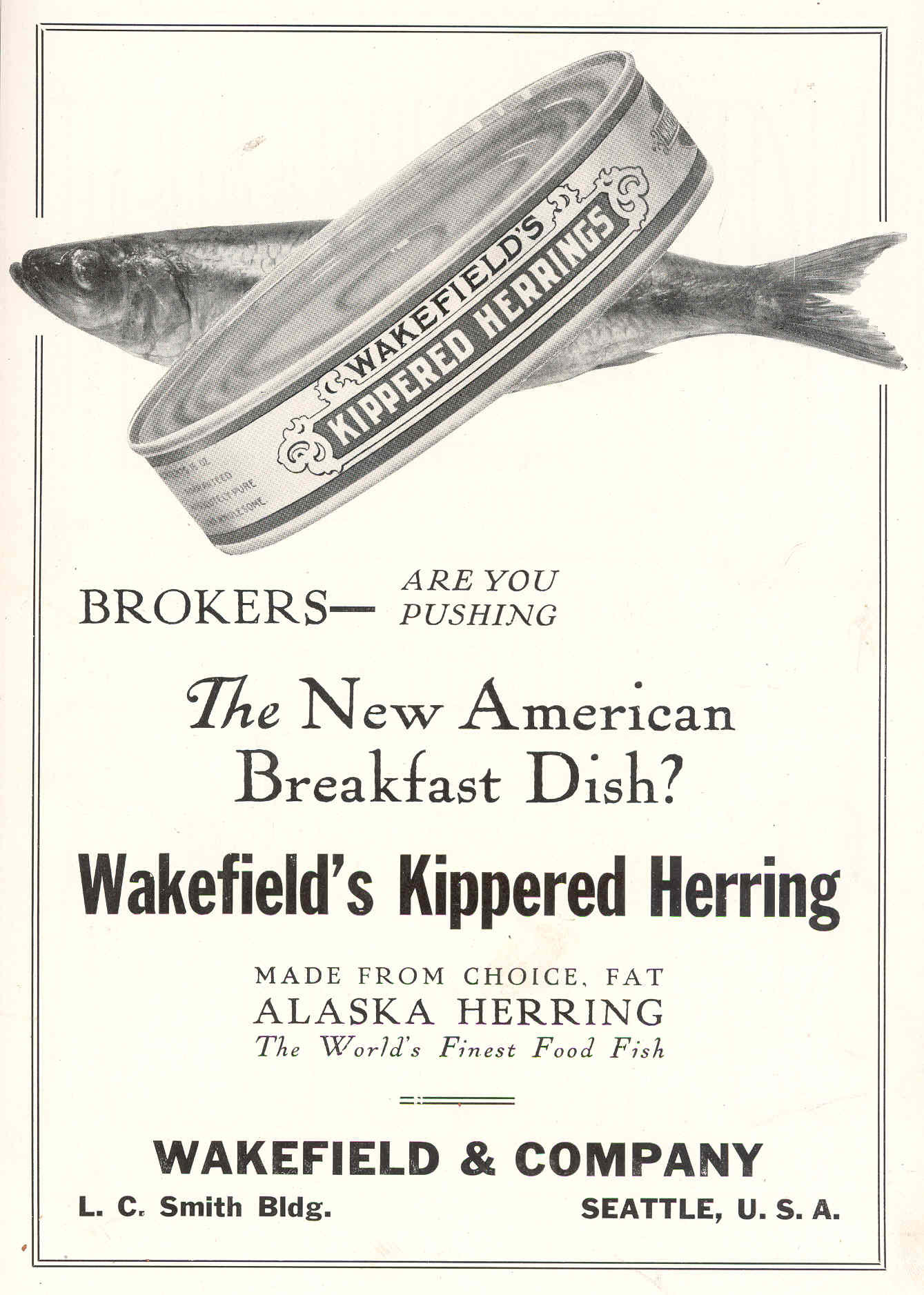
Advertisement for Little Port Walter's canned herring

In 1914 Captain Ashton W. Thomas began fishing at Port Walter for herring to be sold as halibut bait. By 1916 he and a partner, Lee H. Wakefield, had formed the Alaska Herring and Sardine Company, built a processing plant, and hired twenty young women, mostly from Ballard, to can herring at Little Port Walter. The 1916 pack amounted to about 30,000 cases of kippered herring. Each case contained 48 one-pound cans and sold for $7. They were marketed under the brand name of "Wakefield's Kippered Herring". Thomas continued to sell herring for halibut bait, and the heads and viscera of the fish were ground into fertilizer and animal feed. In 1917 the facility also began to mild cure salmon.

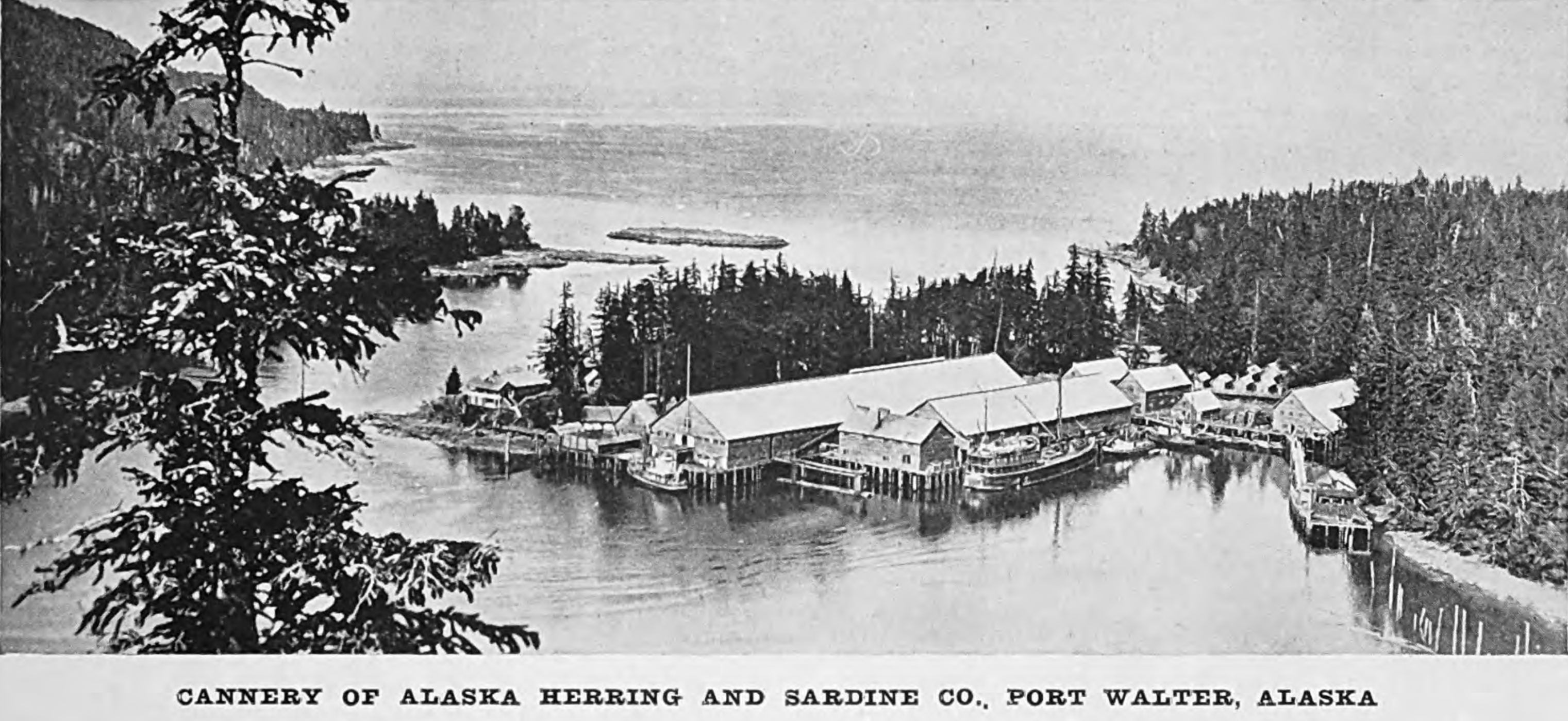
Little Port Walter cannery c.1922

The workers were housed in twenty small cottages which had electric lights. The plant included a radio telegraph set and was issued the callsign KEQ in July 1916. Thomas built an 8-room house on the property for his family.

The Bureau of Fisheries published a detailed description of the kippering process used by the Alaska Herring and Sardine Company in 1916:

...the fish are first spread in a thin layer and sprinkled with salt. A few hours later the heads and viscera are removed. The fish are then placed for a brief period in a salt solution after which they are hung by the tails on sticks, studded on each side with sharpened nails, and subjected to alderwood smoke for several hours. During the smoking process the surplus moisture drains from the body cavities and the outer surfaces. The kippered fish are then packed into oval 1-pound cans. From five to eight fish are required to fill a can. The tops are then put on and the cans closed without the addition of any oil or other preparation. After being closed, the cans are immersed for about two hours in boiling water heated by steam. When cool the cans are ready for labeling, boxing, and shipping.

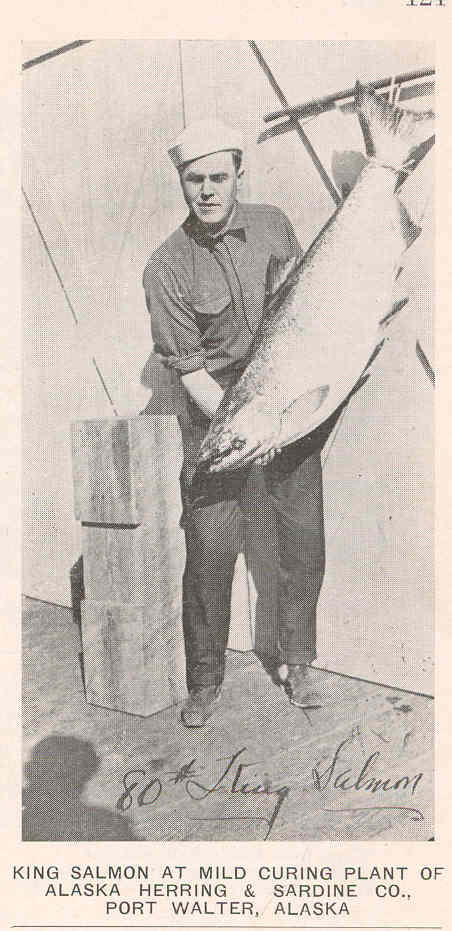
The Little Port Walter plant canned salmon as well as herring

Wakefield bought Thomas' interest in the Alaska Herring and Sardine Company and then, in January 1918, merged his packing businesses, including the Little Port Walter plant, with the fish processing operations of Thomas E. Wilson. The resulting business was known as Wilson Fisheries Company. The new ownership group invested in rebuilding the Little Port Walter facility during the summer of 1918. The new main building was 368 feet long and 80 feet wide. It was two stories tall with a loft above. The plant contained five lines of salmon canning machinery, three lines of herring canning machinery, and two lines of can-making equipment. Wilson Fisheries Company, including its subsidiary Alaska Herring and Sardine Company, was sold to Austin, Nichols & Company, a New York grocery wholesaler, in July 1919. The wholesaler planned to sell all the production from the Wilson Fisheries plants through its own stores without paying brokers as middlemen.

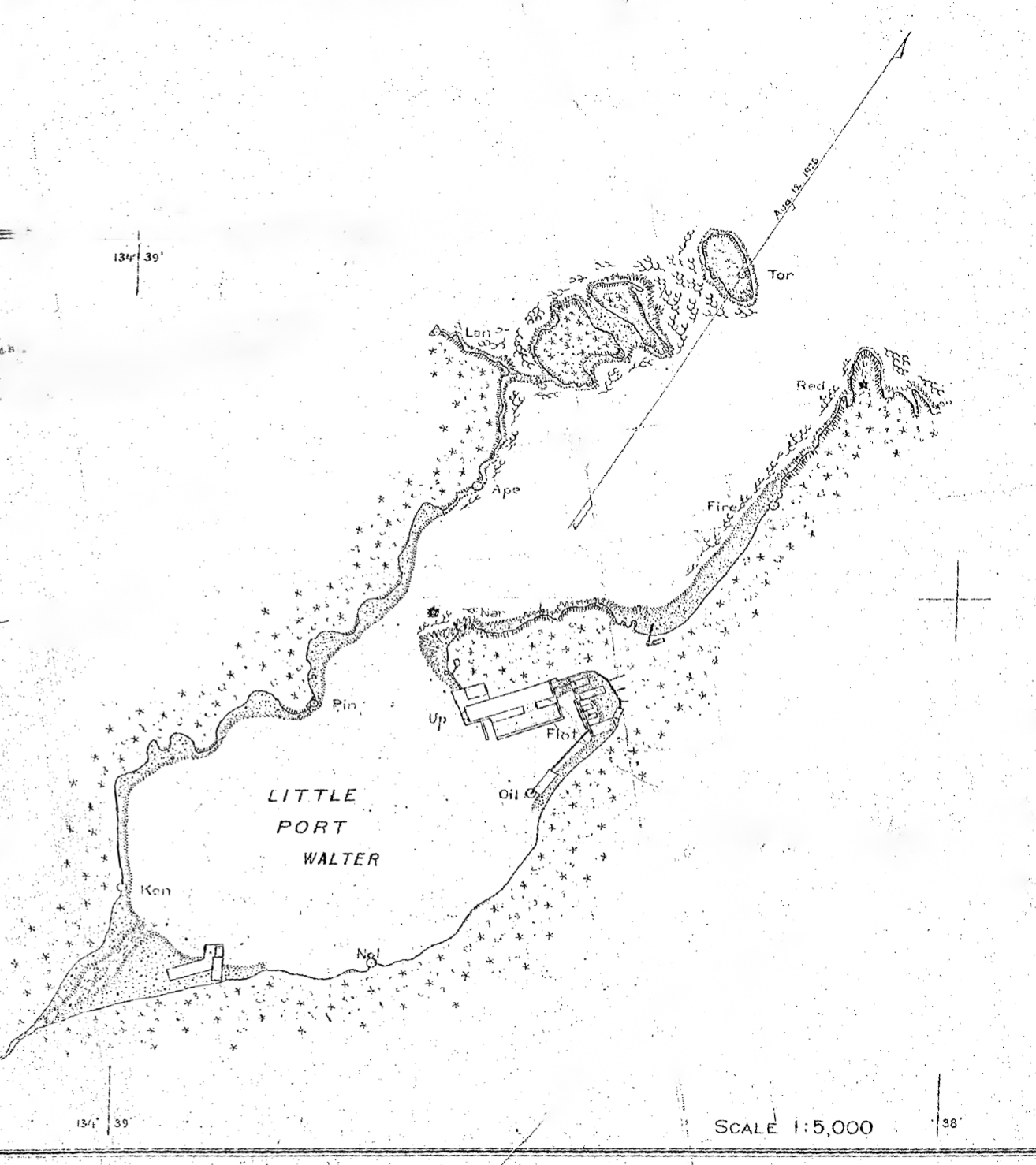
1925 survey of Little Port Walter showing the location of the cannery

On April 11, 1924, a fire destroyed the cold storage buildings, the store, hospital, mess house, and bunk house. The Little Port Walter cannery was closed permanently in 1925, but salmon mild cure and herring reduction operations continued in 1926 and 1927. Austin, Nicols & Co. sold Wilson Fisheries Company to Pacific American Fisheries for $500,000 in 1928. Pacific American Fisheries did not intend to enter the herring canning business, and the Little Port Walter facility remained closed.

==== Pacific Mild Cure Company (1918) ====
A floating processing plant aboard the sailing ship Volante was towed into Little Port Walter in 1918. It was one of several floating and land-based salmon-packing plants operated by the company. 1918 was the only year that Pacific Mild Cure operated in Port Walter.

==== Little Port Walter Research Station (1934-present) ====
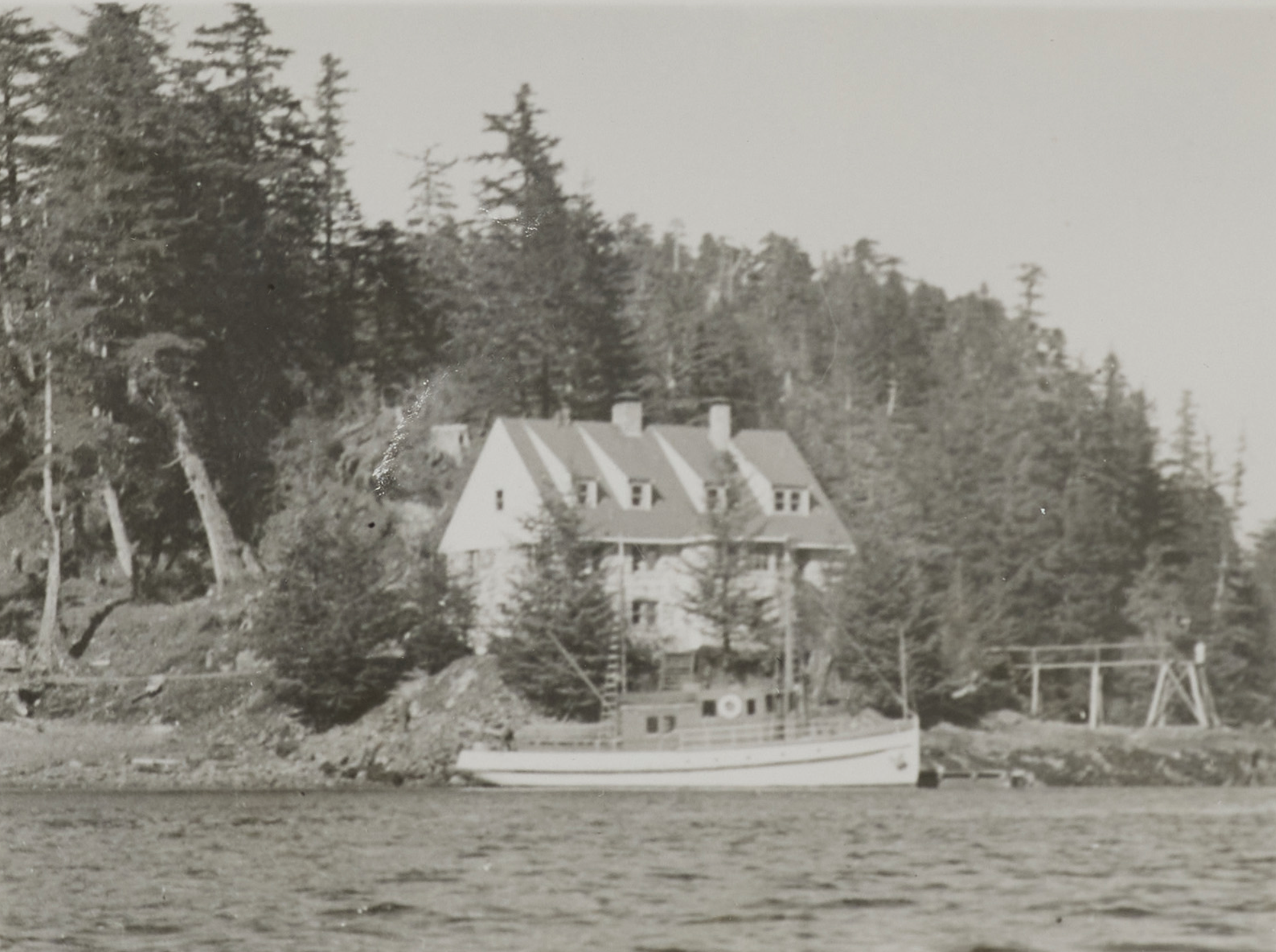
Little Port Walter research station in 1940

Bureau of Fisheries scientists conducted their first season of research at Little Port Walter in the summer of 1934. In February 1938, a Civilian Conservation Corps camp was moved from Juneau to Little Port Walter. C.C.C. personnel cleared some land, built a dock, a 15-room main building, concrete weir, float, cabins, and trails, completing their work by April 1940. Some of the materials they used were salvaged from the abandoned cannery. The Little Port Walter field station opened on June 21, 1938.

The research station has experimented with methods of increasing the abundance of salmon and other commercial species. There is a hatchery on site which has produced pink, silver, and king salmon. Ludvik Lake and Osprey Lake were stocked with silver salmon to test natural lake productivity. Other commercial species, such as spot shrimp have also been studied at Little Port Walter. Over 200 peer-reviewed scientific journal publications have emerged from the work done at the Little Port Walter research station.

Organizationally, the Little Port Walter research station is a unit of Auke Bay Laboratory, which is a unit of the Alaska Fisheries Science Center, which, in turn is a unit of the National Oceanic and Atmospheric Administration of the U.S. Department of Commerce.

== Etymology ==
The European-American name Port Walter does not have a definitive etymology. One source attributes it to local fishermen. Another source says that Herbert C. Graves, Chief of the U.S. Coast and Geodetic Survey's Division of Hydrography and Topography, named Port Herbert, Port Lucy, and Port Walter, three bays near each other on Baranof Island, for three of his three children. While he did have children named Herbert and Lucy, Graves did not have a child Walter. However, his wife's maiden name was Walter, so the possibility of a family connection remains.

Hutchinson Point is reported by the U.S. Geological Survey to be a "fishermen's name." Another source speculates that the fishermen got the name from Sam Hutchinson who was a Bureau of Fisheries official who worked as a field biologist and was instrumental in establishing the Little Port Walter field station.

Lover's Cove is reported by one source to be a local fishermen's name. Another speculates that it got its name from romantic assignations among the workers at the nearby Big Port Walter cannery.

Sashin Lake and Sashin Creek which drains it into Little Port Walter were named by the U.S. Forest Service in 1930 for one of the Russians killed at Starrigavan in 1802 by the Tlingits.

Osprey Lake was named by the U.S. Forest Service in 1935 for HMS Osprey, a Royal Navy sloop which intervened at Sitka in 1879 to quell white panic regarding Tlingit intentions.

Borodino Lake was named by the U.S. Forrest Service in 1935 after the Russian ship Borodino, which lost 40 crew members to scurvy on a trip from Sitka to Kronstadt, Russia in 1820.

Ludvik Lake was named after Louie Ludvik, who was the winter caretaker at the Big Port Walter facility for a number of years.

== Climate ==
Little Port Walter has an oceanic climate (Köppen Cfb) that borders a subpolar oceanic climate (Cfc), with only four months having average temperatures above 50 °F or 10 °C. It receives an average annual precipitation of over 226 inches or 5,700 millimetres and as such is the wettest permanent settlement in the United States and among the wettest in the world with lengthy climate records. As many as seventy-eight days per year see over 1 in (25 mm) of rain and/or snowfall per year, while in October 1974 69.23 in (1,758.4 mm) of rain fell and in January 1985 61.67 in (1,566.4 mm). The record daily precipitation was 14.84 in (376.9 mm) on 6 December 1964. The driest month was February 1989 with 0.63 in (16.0 mm), while the hottest day on record was August 12 of 1990 with 88 °F (31.1 °C) and the coldest January 2 of 1966 with 0 °F (−17.8 °C) overnight. The heaviest snowfall in a month was 94.2 in (2.39 m) in December 2001. Extreme snow was a headache for the canneries in Port Walter, as roof collapses were a constant threat.

Climate data for Little Port Walter, Alaska (1991–2020 normals, extremes 1936–present)
Month	Jan	Feb	Mar	Apr	May	Jun	Jul	Aug	Sep	Oct	Nov	Dec	Year
Record high °F (°C)	59 (15)	58 (14)	58 (14)	67 (19)	72 (22)	80 (27)	79 (26)	88 (31)	73 (23)	61 (16)	57 (14)	55 (13)	88 (31)
Mean maximum °F (°C)	48.1 (8.9)	47.8 (8.8)	48.9 (9.4)	55.7 (13.2)	64.8 (18.2)	70.2 (21.2)	71.0 (21.7)	70.5 (21.4)	63.9 (17.7)	56.7 (13.7)	51.5 (10.8)	48.1 (8.9)	74.2 (23.4)
Mean daily maximum °F (°C)	37.9 (3.3)	38.9 (3.8)	40.8 (4.9)	46.7 (8.2)	53.8 (12.1)	58.3 (14.6)	61.3 (16.3)	61.3 (16.3)	56.3 (13.5)	49.2 (9.6)	42.5 (5.8)	38.9 (3.8)	48.8 (9.3)
Daily mean °F (°C)	34.4 (1.3)	35.1 (1.7)	36.3 (2.4)	41.2 (5.1)	47.3 (8.5)	52.4 (11.3)	55.8 (13.2)	55.9 (13.3)	51.7 (10.9)	45.0 (7.2)	38.7 (3.7)	35.6 (2.0)	44.1 (6.7)
Mean daily minimum °F (°C)	30.9 (−0.6)	31.3 (−0.4)	31.9 (−0.1)	35.8 (2.1)	40.8 (4.9)	46.4 (8.0)	50.4 (10.2)	50.5 (10.3)	47.0 (8.3)	40.8 (4.9)	35.0 (1.7)	32.3 (0.2)	39.4 (4.1)
Mean minimum °F (°C)	19.3 (−7.1)	20.7 (−6.3)	21.2 (−6.0)	27.5 (−2.5)	32.7 (0.4)	38.6 (3.7)	42.8 (6.0)	43.1 (6.2)	37.9 (3.3)	30.6 (−0.8)	24.5 (−4.2)	21.8 (−5.7)	13.8 (−10.1)
Record low °F (°C)	0 (−18)	3 (−16)	5 (−15)	18 (−8)	24 (−4)	32 (0)	34 (1)	35 (2)	26 (−3)	23 (−5)	4 (−16)	4 (−16)	0 (−18)
Average precipitation inches (mm)	27.97 (710)	18.93 (481)	18.11 (460)	14.65 (372)	12.23 (311)	7.85 (199)	10.37 (263)	16.74 (425)	25.72 (653)	31.61 (803)	29.39 (747)	32.15 (817)	245.72 (6,241)
Average snowfall inches (cm)	28.0 (71)	19.7 (50)	20.1 (51)	1.7 (4.3)	0.0 (0.0)	0.0 (0.0)	0.0 (0.0)	0.0 (0.0)	0.0 (0.0)	0.4 (1.0)	10.3 (26)	21.6 (55)	101.8 (259)
Average precipitation days (≥ 0.01 in)	24.2	19.6	20.7	18.8	15.0	14.8	15.0	16.7	21.3	24.1	24.4	24.6	239.2
Average snowy days (≥ 0.1 in)	8.0	6.0	6.8	1.1	0.1	0.0	0.0	0.0	0.0	0.3	3.4	7.1	32.8
Source 1: NOAA
Source 2: National Weather Service

== Demographics ==
Port Walter appeared once on the 1940 U.S. Census as an unincorporated village of 21 residents. This referred to "Big Port Walter." It was not reported again on the census, and was later annexed into Sitka.

== Seafood production ==
Production figures from fish processing plants are incomplete. All of the plants produced fish meal and fish oil, but these statistics have not survived. Small runs of clams, halibut, and other products were produced from time to time, but their quantities are unknown.

Little Port Walter Plant
	Salmon (cases)	Herring (cases)	Pickled Herring (barrels)	Mild Cured Salmon (tierces)	Salted Salmon (barrels)	Company	Notes
1916		~30,000				Alaska Herring and Sardine Co.	
1917	24,389	32,623		229		Alaska Herring and Sardine Co.	
1918	32,963			157	20	Alaska Herring and Sardine Co.	
1919	67,197		537	78		Alaska Herring and Sardine Co.	
1921	28,035					Alaska Herring and Sardine Co.	
1922	23,346		2,509			Alaska Herring and Sardine Co.	
1923	85,443		2,043			Alaska Herring and Sardine Co.	
1924	84,403		2,363			Alaska Herring and Sardine Co.	
1925	59,700		2,995			Alaska Herring and Sardine Co.	Last year for cannery
1926				~200	375	Alaska Herring and Sardine Co.	
1927				194	35	Alaska Herring and Sardine Co.	

Big Port Walter Plant
	Salmon (cases)	Herring (cases)	Pickled Herring (barrels)	Fish Meal (tons)	Fish Oil (gallons)	Company	Notes
1917	23,293	17,274				Alaska Pacific Herring Co.	
1918	17,674					Alaska Pacific Herring Co.	
1919	37,528		7,518			Southern Alaska Canning Co.	
1920	17,187			400	100,000	Southern Alaska Canning Co.	
1921			7,242			Arentsen & Buchan	
1922			6,372			E. Arentsen & Co.	
1923			2,919			E. Arentsen & Co.	
1924			2,761			E. Arentsen & Co.	
1925			3,281			E. Arentsen & Co.	
1926			945			E. Arentsen & Co.	
1927			2,437			E. Arentsen & Co.	
1940-1944							Did not operate
1951-1955							Did not operate

New Port Walter Plant
	Pickled Herring (barrels)	Fish Meal (tons)	Fish Oil (gallons)	Company	Notes
1919	2,677			Chatham Straits Fish Co.	
1921	157			Chatham Straits Fish Co.	
1922	5,100			Chatham Straits Fish Co.	
1923	668	350	110,000	Chatham Straits Fish Co.	
1924	1,418			Chatham Straits Fish Co.	
1925	1,813			Chatham Straits Fish Co.	
1926	770			Chatham Straits Fish Co.	
1931-1932				Chatham Straits Fish Co.	Did not operate
1936				Chatham Straits Fish Co	Did not operate
