= Conflict Group =

Atoll in Papua New Guinea

Conflict Islands
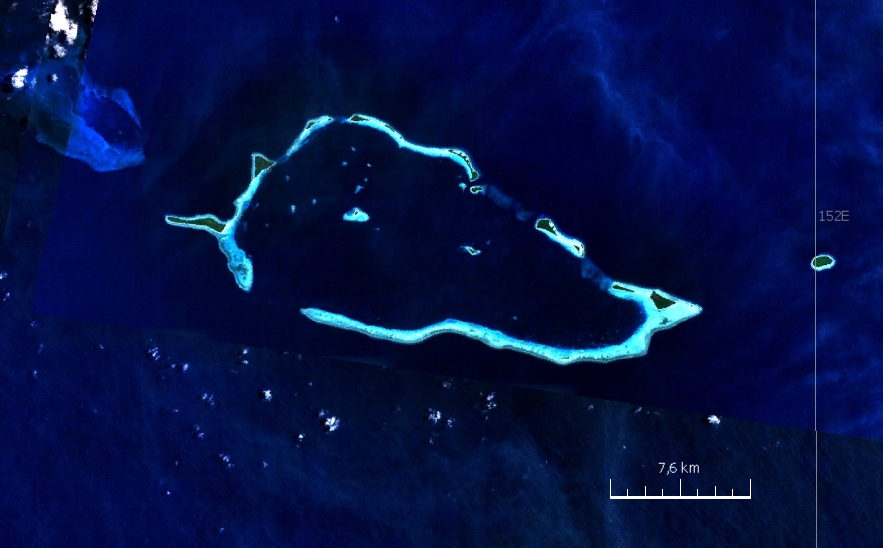
- Satellite image

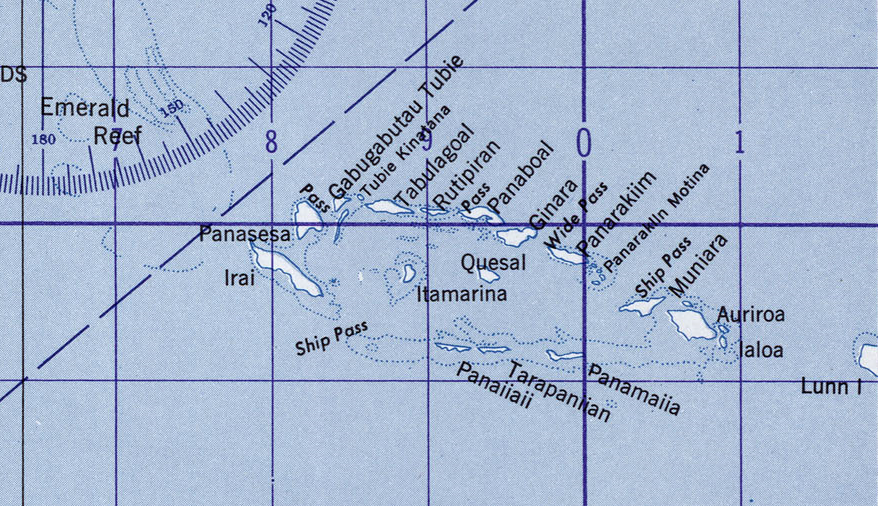

- Location of the Conflict Islands

Geography
- Location: Oceania
- Coordinates: 10°46′48″S 151°47′32″E
- Archipelago: Louisiade Archipelago
- Adjacent to: Solomon Sea
- Total islands: 21
- Major islands: Irai; Lunn; Auriroa; Panarakuum; Panasesa
- Area: 4.55 km^{2} (1.76 sq mi)
- Length: 21 km (13 mi)
- Width: 10 km (6 mi)

Administration
- Papua New Guinea
- Province: Milne Bay
- District: Samarai-Murua District
- LLG: Bwanabwana Rural LLG
- Island Group: Calvados Chain
- Largest settlement: Irai (pop. 20)

Demographics
- Population: 30 (2014)
- Pop. density: 6.6/km^{2} (17.1/sq mi)
- Ethnic groups: Papauans, Austronesians, Melanesians.

Additional information
- Time zone: AEST (UTC+10)
- ISO code: PG-MBA
- Official website: www.ncdc.gov.pg

The Conflict Group is an atoll in Papua New Guinea. The group was sighted in 1879 by HMS Cormorant, by moonlight; it was named in 1880 by Bower, captain of HMS Conflict. Irai Island is the center of population of the group.

The small Panasesa Island has an eco resort with a small staff.

In September 2022 the Papua New Guinea government ordered an investigation into the islands' ownership after their owner, Australian businessman Ian Gowrie Smith, attempted to sell them.

== Islands in Conflict Group ==
The individual islands in a clockwise direction, starting in the west (Kisa and Itamarina in the lagoon):

Name	Coordinates	Area km²	Area sq mi
Ilai (Irai Island)	10.7675°S 151.6925°E	1.18	0.46
Panasesa Island	10.7400°S 151.7250°E	0.68	0.26
Madiboiboi?	10.7306°S 151.7406°E	0.10	0.039
Gabugabutau	10.7210°S 151.7485°E	0.17	0.066
Tubinagurm Island	10.7175°S 151.7723°E	0.25	0.097
Lutmatavi Island	10.7220°S 151.7874°E	0.06	0.023
Panaboal	10.7393°S 151.8255°E	0.52	0.20
Ginara Island	10.7521°S 151.8308°E	0.14	0.054
Panarakuum Island	10.7699°S 151.8654°E	0.51	0.20
Panarakiim Motina	10.7807°S 151.8808°E	0.08	0.031
Muniara Island	10.8002°S 151.9032°E	0.23	0.089
Auriroa Island	10.8064°S 151.9224°E	0.76	0.29
Panamaiia	10.8341°S 151.8745°E	0.06	0.023
Tarapaniian	10.8258°S 151.8403°E	0.06	0.023
Panaiiaii	10.8207°S 151.8288°E	0.05	0.019
Kisa	10.7821°S 151.8285°E	0.08	0.031
Itamarina	10.7634°S 151.7711°E	0.05	0.019

Differing surface areas, and sometimes divergent names for individual islands can be found in Oceandots: Irai (97 ha; 240 acres), Panasesa (63.5 ha; 157 acres), Auriora (61 ha; 150 acres), Panarakum (38.8 ha; 96 acres), Panibari (24.7 ha; 61 acres), Tubiniguam (17.8 ha; 44 acres), Moniara (13 ha; 32 acres), Ginouri (11 ha; 27 acres) and Tupit (10 ha; 25 acres). Thereafter, the total land area of the archipelago is 3.75 km^{2} (1.45 sq mi).
