= Battle of the Titans =

Battle of the Titans may refer to

- The Titanomachy of Greek mythology
- The 1970 24 Hours of Le Mans race

== See also ==
- Battle of the Giants (disambiguation)
- Clash of the Titans (disambiguation)
