= Confrontation (disambiguation) =

Confrontation is an element of conflict wherein parties confront one another.

Confrontation or The Confrontation may also refer to:

== Arts, entertainment, and media ==
=== Films ===
- American Ninja 2: The Confrontation, a 1987 action film
- The Confrontation (film), a 1969 Hungarian drama film

=== Gaming ===
- Confrontation (Games Workshop), a wargame and forerunner to the Necromunda wargame
- Confrontation (Rackham), a miniatures wargame
  - Confrontation (video game), a video game adaptation
- SOCOM U.S. Navy SEALs: Confrontation, a 2008 video game

=== Music ===
- Confrontation (Bob Marley & The Wailers album) (1983)
- Confrontation (Face to Face album) (1985)
- Confrontation (Soilent Green album) (2005)
- "The Confrontation", a track on the 1970 soundtrack album The Owl and the Pussycat
- "The Confrontation", a song from Les Misérables

=== Television ===
- Confrontation (miniseries), a 1985 Soviet six-part television film
- "Confrontation", an episode of Death Note
- "Confrontation", an episode of Law & Order: Special Victims Unit
- "The Confrontation", an episode of The Simple Life

=== Other uses in arts, entertainment, and media ===
- Confrontation (journal), an American literary magazine founded in 1968

== See also ==
- Conflict (disambiguation)
- Confrontation analysis, an operational analysis technique
- Confrontation Clause, of the 6th Amendment to the U.S. Constitution
- Confrontation visual field testing
- Indonesia–Malaysia confrontation, 1963–66
