= Irai Island =

Island in Papua New Guinea

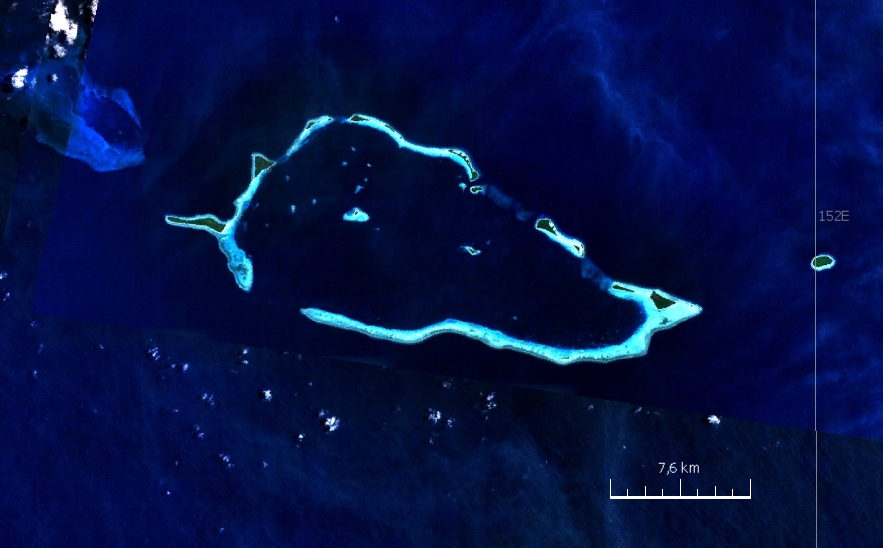
- Satellite image

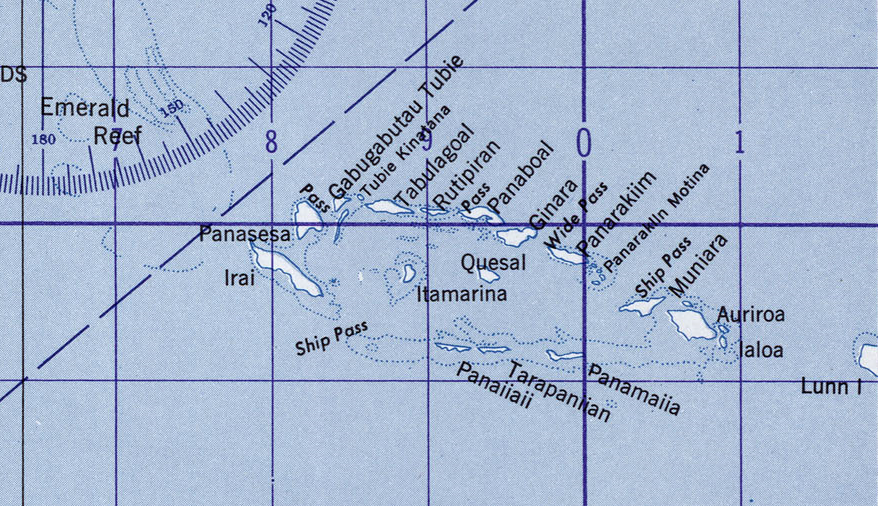

- 10°46′03″S 151°41′33″E

Geography
- Location: Oceania
- Coordinates: 10°46′03″S 151°41′33″E
- Archipelago: Louisiade Archipelago
- Adjacent to: Solomon Sea
- Total islands: 1
- Major islands: Irai
- Area: 1.08 km^{2} (0.42 sq mi)
- Length: 6 km (3.7 mi)
- Width: 0.25 km (0.155 mi)

Administration
- Papua New Guinea
- Province: Milne Bay
- District: Samarai-Murua District
- LLG: Bwanabwana Rural LLG
- Island Group: Calvados Chain
- Largest settlement: Copra Plantation (pop. 20)

Demographics
- Population: 20 (2014)
- Pop. density: 18.5/km^{2} (47.9/sq mi)
- Ethnic groups: Papauans, Austronesians, Melanesians.

Additional information
- Time zone: AEST (UTC+10)
- ISO code: PG-MBA
- Official website: www.ncdc.gov.pg

Irai Island is the main island of the Conflict Islands, in the Louisiade Archipelago in Milne Bay Province, Papua New Guinea. It was sighted in 1879 by HMS Cormorant and named in 1880 by Bower, captain of HMS Conflict.
