= HMS Pelican (1877) =

Sloop of the Royal Navy

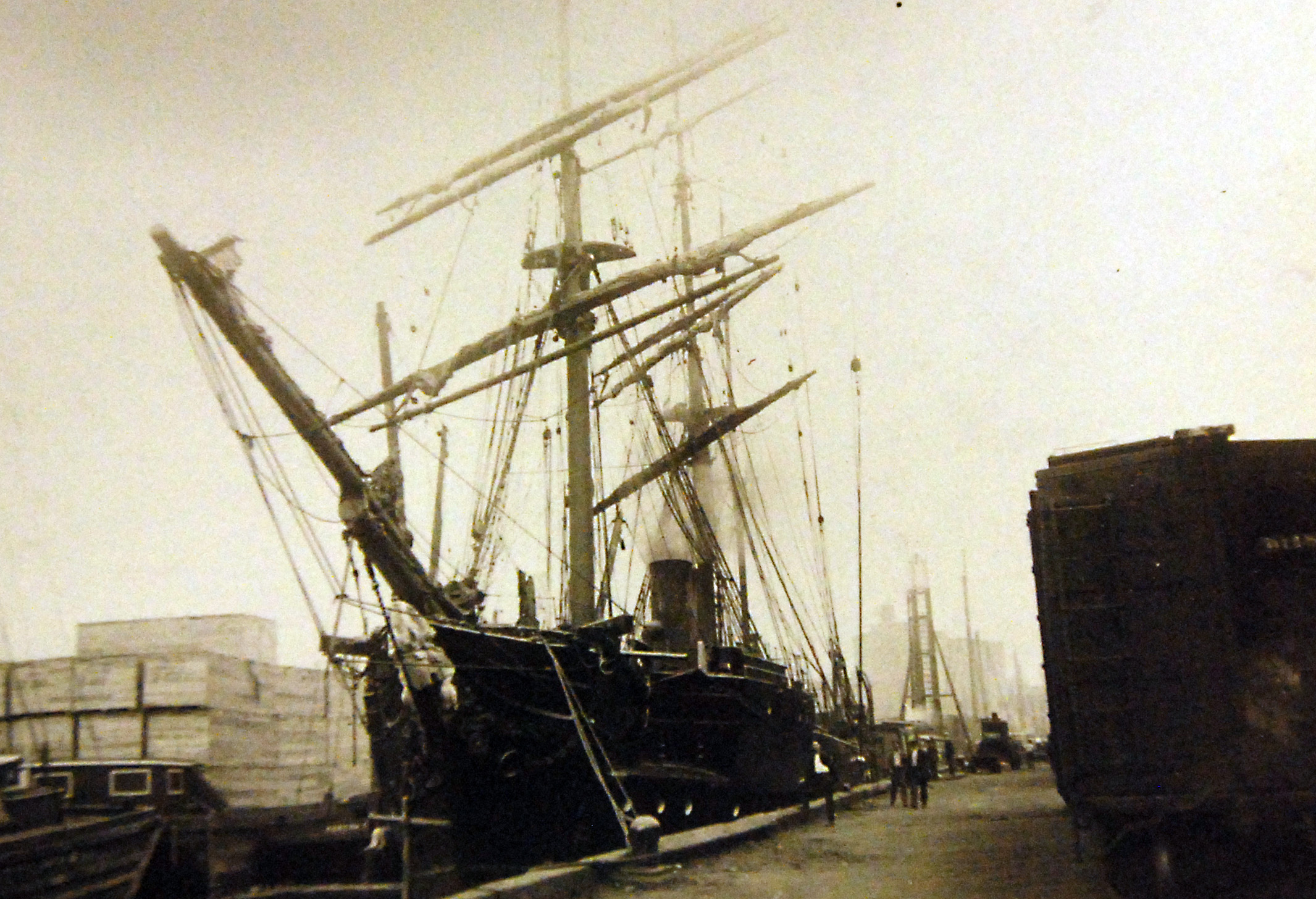
- Pelican docked at Bush's Store, South Brooklyn, New York

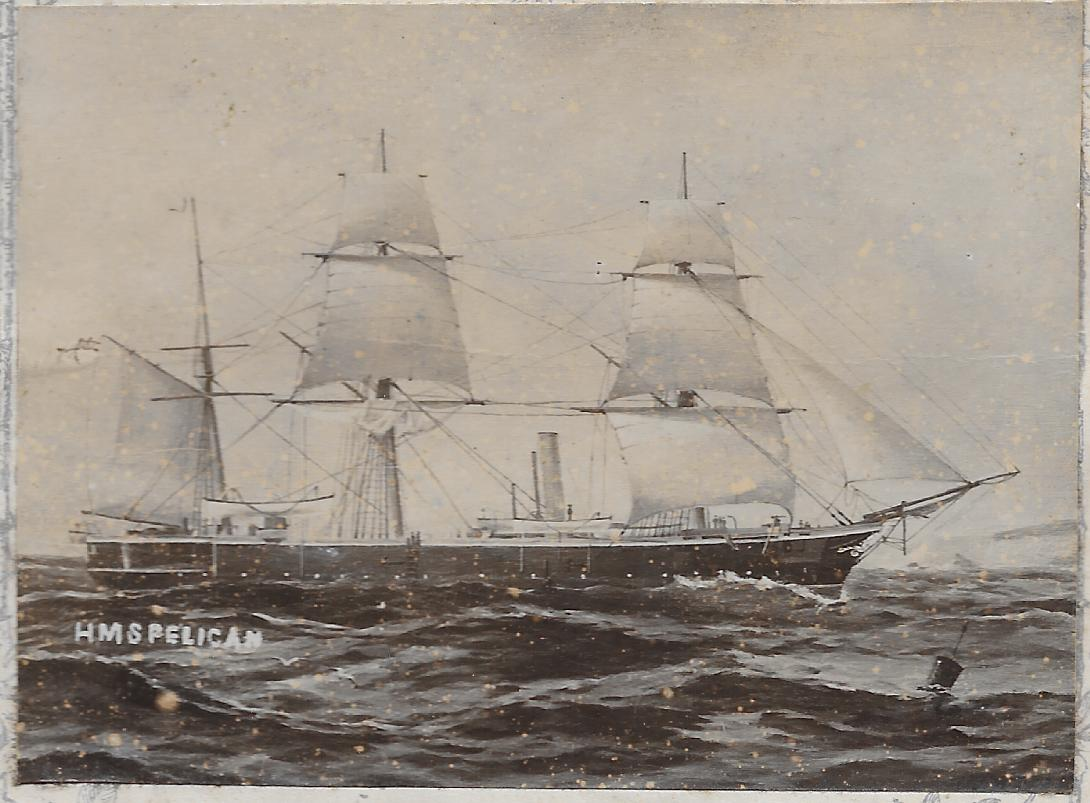
- HMS Pelican

History

United Kingdom
- Name: HMS Pelican
- Namesake: Pelican
- Builder: Devonport Royal Dockyard
- Cost: Hull £41,282, machinery £14,939
- Laid down: 8 March 1875
- Launched: 26 April 1877
- Completed: 29 November 1877
- Decommissioned: 1899
- Fate: Sold to the Hudson's Bay Company, 22 January 1901; scuttled, 1953

General characteristics
- Class & type: Osprey-class screw composite sloop
- Displacement: 1,130 long tons (1,150 t)
- Length: 170 ft (51.8 m) (p/p)
- Beam: 36 ft (11.0 m)
- Draught: 15 ft 9 in (4.8 m)
- Depth: 19 ft 6 in (5.9 m)
- Installed power: 1,056 ihp (787 kW)
- Propulsion: 1 × 2-cylinder horizontal compound-expansion steam engine; 3 × cylindrical boilers; 1 × screw
- Sail plan: Barque rig
- Speed: 12 knots (22 km/h; 14 mph)
- Range: 1,480 nmi (2,740 km; 1,700 mi) at 10 knots (19 km/h; 12 mph)
- Complement: 140
- Armament: 2 × 7-inch rifled muzzle-loading guns; 4 × 6.3-inch 64-pounder rifled muzzle-loading guns; 4 × machine guns; 1 × light gun; Later re-armed: 2 × 6-inch (81cwt) BL guns; 6 × 5-inch (35cwt) BL guns; 4 × machine guns; 1 × light gun

HMS Pelican was an Osprey-class sloop built for the Royal Navy in the mid-1870s. She was launched in 1877 and was sold to the Hudson's Bay Company in 1901. She was scuttled in 1953.

== Design and construction ==
Pelican was an Osprey-class sloop-of-war, with a composite hull design. The ship had a displacement of 1,130 tons, was 170 feet (52 m) long, had a beam of 36 feet (11 m), and a draught of 15 feet 9 inches (4.80 m). A Humphrys, Tennant and Co. two-cylinder two-cylinder horizontal compound-expansion steam engine fed by three cylindrical boilers provided 1,056 indicated horsepower to the single 13 ft (4.0 m) propeller screw. This gave Pelican a top speed of 12.2 knots (22.6 km/h; 14.0 mph). She had a maximum range of 1,480 nautical miles (2,740 km; 1,700 mi) at 10 kn (19 km/h; 12 mph). In addition to the steam-driven propeller, the vessel was also barque rigged. The standard ship's company was between 140 and 150.

Pelican was built by Devonport Royal Dockyard. The vessel was laid down on 8 March 1875. She was launched on 26 April 1877. Construction costs included £41,282 for the hull, and £14,939 for machinery and equipment. Armament consisted of two 7-inch (90cwt) muzzle-loading rifled guns, four 64-pound guns, four machine guns, and one light gun. Pelican and her sister-ship Wild Swan were re-armed later with two 6-inch (81cwt) BL guns and six 5-inch (35cwt) BL guns.

== Naval career ==
Pelican was commissioned into the Royal Navy on 29 November 1877. In March 1878, Pelican was hailed by the French merchant ship Gustave, which had the crew of the American merchant steamship P. R. Hazeltine, which had foundered off Cape Horn, Chile on 18 February, on board. The captain of the American ship desired Pelican to take his crew on board, claiming the French ship was short of water, but later contradicting himself. As both ships would reach Valparaíso at about the same time, The captain of Pelican refused to take them on board. The French captain subsequently laid a charge that Pelican had refused to aid a ship in distress. This was refuted by two of the crew of P. R. Hazeltine in a sworn affidavit.

== Civil career ==
Pelican was sold as a supply ship on 22 January 1901 to the Hudson's Bay Company for use as a northern supply ship. During World War I, Pelican was delivering supplies to Russia when she was engaged by a surfaced U-boat. The fight lasted one-and-a-half hours, but eventually, the U-boat was driven off. In 1922, the ship was no longer considered serviceable and was sold as scrap to Fraim Bannikhin of St. John's for $1,500. However, the vessel was not scrapped, instead being reduced to a barge. In November 1922, the barge parted its hawser off Flat Point, while being towed to Sydney, Nova Scotia. The barge grounded near Sable Island. Pelican was recovered by the tugboat Ocean Eagle II and towed her towards Sydney. However, once in the harbour, the barge grounded again on the South Bar. The barge was recovered again and docked at Sydney. In 1927, the barge sank to the bottom of the harbour after being vandalized and her sea cocks opened. The hulk remained with masts, port gunwales and forecastle above water at the wharf for 23 years. The hulk was towed out to sea, escorted by HMCS Porte Dauphine and scuttled in June 1953.

== Bibliography ==
- Ballard, G. A. (1939). "British Sloops of 1875: The Larger Ram-Bowed Type". Mariner's Mirror. 25 (January). Cambridge, UK: Society for Nautical Research: 35–49. doi:10.1080/00253359.1939.10657318.
- Colledge, J. J.; Wardlow, Ben & Bush, Steve (2020). Ships of the Royal Navy: The Complete Record of All Fighting Ships of the Royal Navy from the 15th Century to the Present (5th ed.). Barnsley, UK: Seaforth Publishing. ISBN 978-1-5267-9327-0.
- Roberts, John (1979). "Great Britain and Empire Forces". In Chesneau, Roger & Kolesnik, Eugene M. (eds.). Conway's All the World's Fighting Ships 1860-1905. Greenwich, UK: Conway Maritime Press. ISBN 0-8317-0302-4.
- Lyon, David & Winfield, Rif (2004). The Sail and Steam Navy List: All the Ships of the Royal Navy 1815–1889. Chatham Publishing. ISBN 978-1-86176-032-6. OCLC 52620555.
