= HMS Conflict =

Six ships of the Royal Navy have borne the name HMS Conflict:

- HMS Conflict (1801) was a 12-gun gun-brig launched in 1801 that grounded in 1804, enabling the French to capture her; the French Navy commissioned her in October 1806, renamed her Lynx in September 1814, reverted to Conflict in March 1815, and Lynx again in July 1815. As Lynx she was present at naval actions at Cadiz (1823), where she came under fire, Algiers (1830), and possibly the river Tagus (1831). She was struck from the Navy at Rochefort in October 1834 and broken up in November.
- HMS Conflict (1805) was a 12-gun gun-brig launched in 1805. She captured a number of vessels, including privateers, and participated in several major actions. She disappeared in November 1810 with the loss of all her crew.
- HMS Conflict (1812) was a 12-gun gun-brig launched in 1812. She was hulked in 1832 and sold in 1840.
- HMS Conflict (1846) was a wooden screw sloop launched in 1846, rebuilt in 1848 and sold in 1863.
- HMS Conflict (1873) was a schooner launched in 1873 and sold in 1882.
- HMS Conflict (1894) was a Conflict-class destroyer launched in 1894 and sold in 1920.
