= Panarakuum Island =

Island in Papua New Guinea

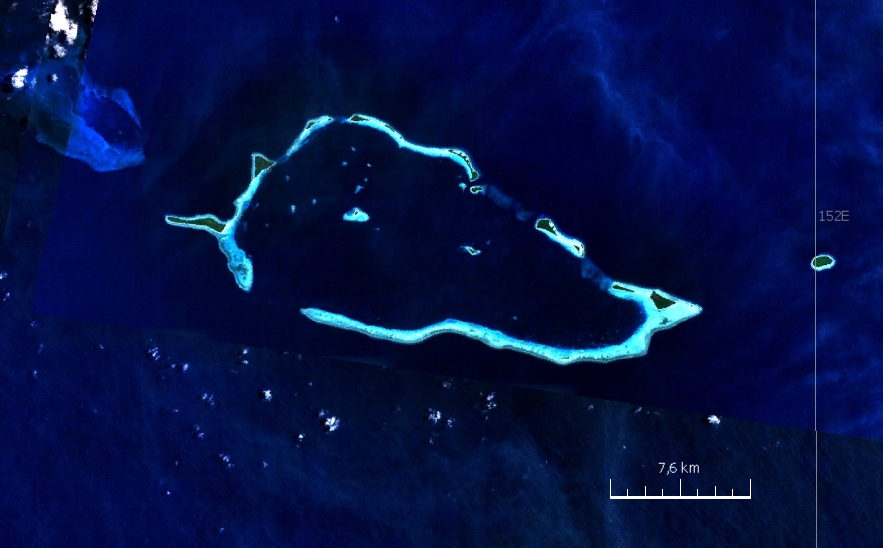
- Satellite image

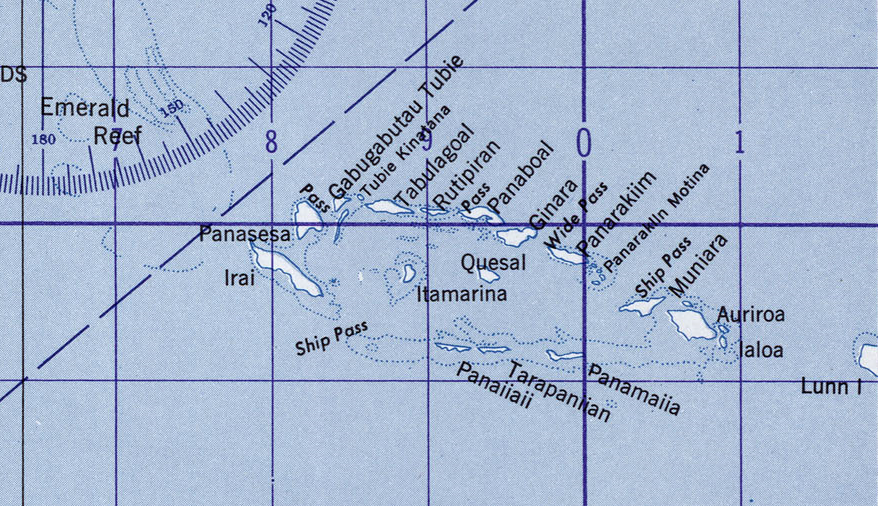

- Location of the Conflict Islands

Geography
- Location: Oceania
- Coordinates: 10°46′12″S 151°51′54″E
- Archipelago: Louisiade Archipelago
- Adjacent to: Solomon Sea
- Total islands: 1
- Major islands: Panarakuum
- Area: 0.51 km^{2} (0.20 sq mi)

Administration
- Papua New Guinea
- Province: Milne Bay
- District: Samarai-Murua District
- LLG: Bwanabwana Rural LLG
- Island Group: Conflict Group

Demographics
- Population: 0 (2014)
- Pop. density: 0/km^{2} (0/sq mi)
- Ethnic groups: Papauans, Austronesians, Melanesians.

Additional information
- Time zone: AEST (UTC+10)
- ISO code: PG-MBA
- Official website: www.ncdc.gov.pg

Panarakuum Island also known as Panarakiim Island is an island in Milne Bay Province of Papua New Guinea.

It is in the Conflict Group archipelago, part of the Louisiade Archipelago in the Solomon Sea.
