= The Green Man Collection =

Compilation album by Steeleye Span
- Released: 2023

Steeleye Span chronology
Est'd 1969 (2019)	The Green Man Collection (2023)	Conflict (2025)

The Green Man Collection is a compilation album by Steeleye Span released in 2023, which features released tracks as well as unreleased and newly recorded tracks.
