= Auriroa Island =

Island in Papua New Guinea

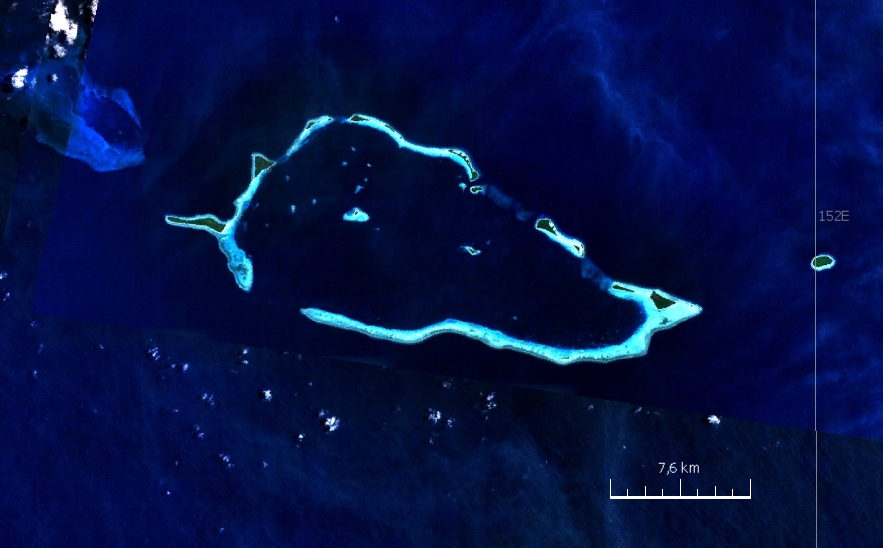
- Satellite image

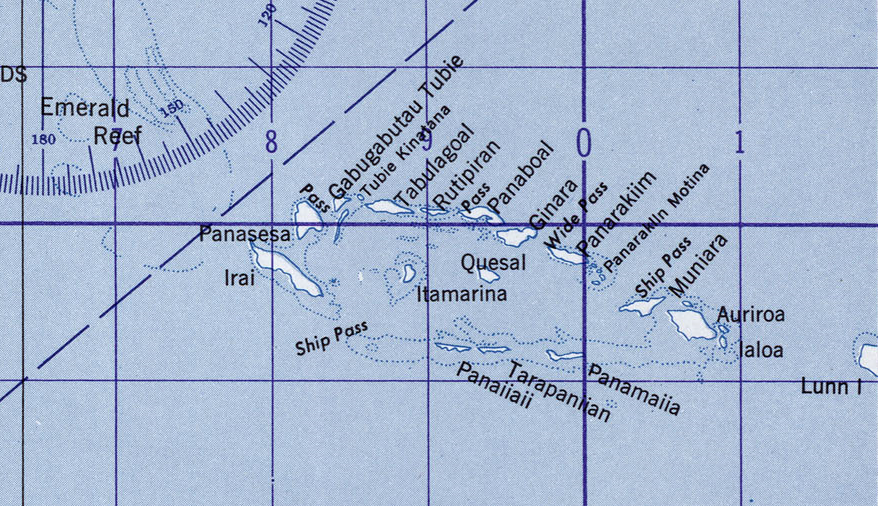

- Location of the Conflict Islands

Geography
- Location: Oceania
- Coordinates: 10°48′18″S 151°55′12″E
- Archipelago: Louisiade Archipelago
- Adjacent to: Solomon Sea
- Total islands: 1
- Major islands: Auriroa
- Area: 0.76 km^{2} (0.29 sq mi)

Administration
- Papua New Guinea
- Province: Milne Bay
- District: Samarai-Murua District
- LLG: Bwanabwana Rural LLG
- Island Group: Conflict Group

Demographics
- Population: 0 (2014)
- Pop. density: 0/km^{2} (0/sq mi)
- Ethnic groups: Papauans, Austronesians, Melanesians.

Additional information
- Time zone: AEST (UTC+10)
- ISO code: PG-MBA
- Official website: www.ncdc.gov.pg

Auriroa Island is an island in Milne Bay Province of Papua New Guinea.

It is in the Conflict Group archipelago; it is also part of the Louisiade Archipelago in the Solomon Sea.
