= Battle of the Giants =

Battle of the Giants may refer to:

- "Battle of the Giants!", a Christmas special of the TV series Dad's Army
- Battle of the Giants (Fiji), an annual football competition in Fiji

== See also ==
- Combat of Giants, a video game series formerly called Battle of Giants in North America
- Battle of the Titans (disambiguation)
