= Clash of the Gods =

Clash of the Gods may refer to:

- Clash of the Gods (TV series), a 2009 television series on the History channel
- Clash of the Gods (album), a 2012 album by Grave Digger
