= HMS Wild Swan (1876) =

Sloop of the Royal Navy

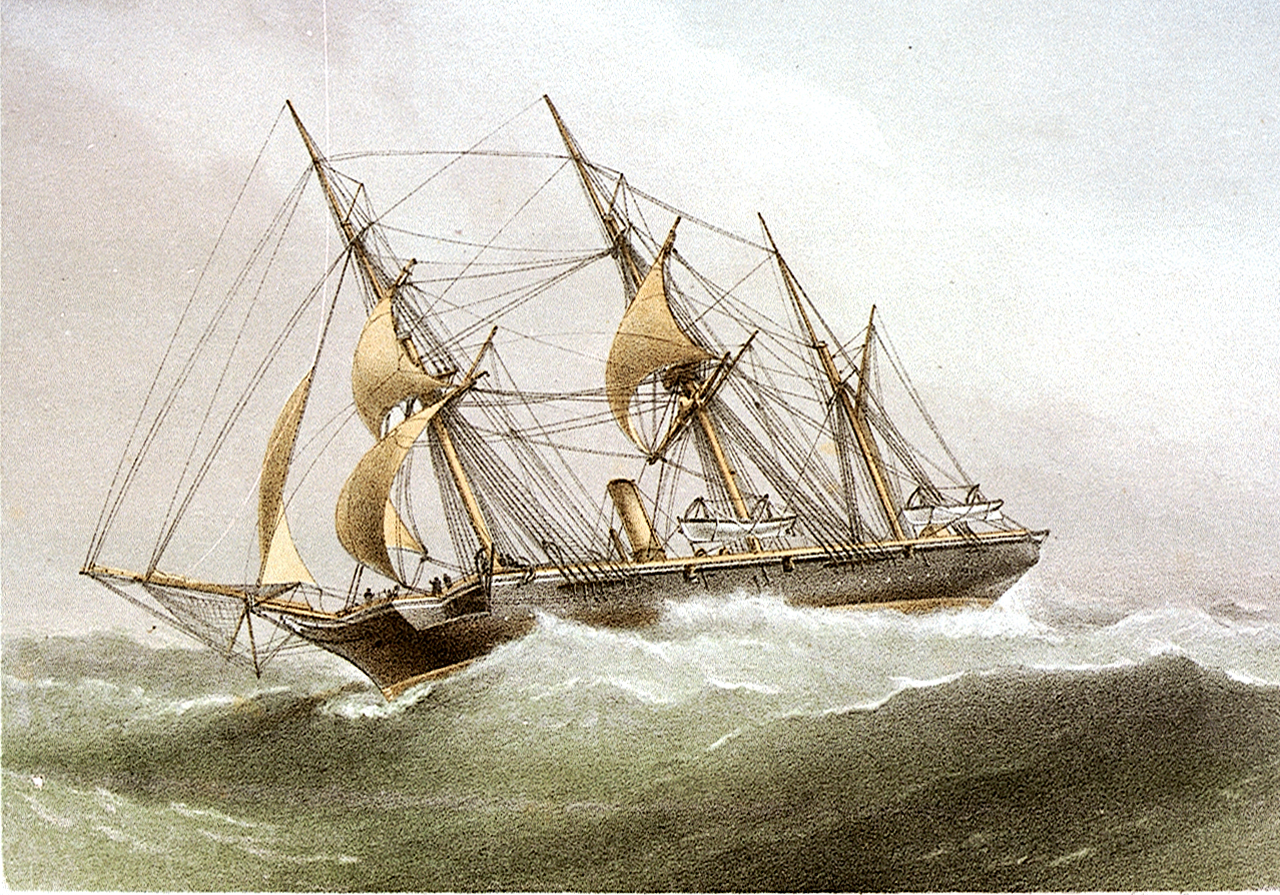

History

United Kingdom
- Name: HMS Wild Swan
- Namesake: Swan
- Builder: Robert Napier and Sons, Govan, Glasgow
- Cost: Hull £39,643, machinery £11,853
- Laid down: 14 September 1874
- Launched: 28 January 1876
- Completed: 23 August 1876
- Decommissioned: Hulked, 1 May 1904
- Renamed: HMS Clyde, 1 May 1904; HMS Columbine, July 1913
- Fate: Sold for scrap, 4 May 1920

General characteristics
- Class & type: Osprey-class screw composite sloop
- Displacement: 1,130 long tons (1,150 t)
- Length: 170 ft (51.8 m) (p/p)
- Beam: 36 ft (11.0 m)
- Draught: 15 ft 9 in (4.8 m)
- Depth: 19 ft 6 in (5.9 m)
- Installed power: 797 ihp (594 kW); (later c. 950 ihp (709kW))
- Propulsion: 1 × 2-cylinder horizontal returning-rod steam engine (Note: The horizontal returning-rod steam engine by R & W Hawthorn failed to meet the contract speed and was replaced after the first commission by a Devonport Dockyard 2-cylinder horizontal compound-expansion steam engine); 3 × cylindrical boilers; 1 × screw
- Sail plan: Barque rig
- Speed: 10 knots (19 km/h; 12 mph)
- Range: 1,120 nmi (2,070 km; 1,290 mi) at 10 knots (19 km/h; 12 mph)
- Complement: 140
- Armament: 2 × 7-inch rifled muzzle-loading guns; 4 × 6.3-inch 64-pounder rifled muzzle-loading guns; 4 × machine guns; 1 × light gun; Later re-armed: 2 × 6-inch (81cwt) BL guns; 6 × 5-inch (35cwt) BL guns; 4 × machine guns; 1 × light gun

HMS Wild Swan was an Osprey-class sloop built for the Royal Navy in the mid-1870s. She was launched in 1877 and became a base ship in 1904, being renamed Clyde. She was renamed Columbine in 1913 and was sold for breaking in 1920.

== Design and construction ==
Wild Swan was an Osprey-class sloop-of-war, with a composite hull design. The ship had a displacement of 1,130 tons, was 170 feet (52 m) long, had a beam of 36 feet (11 m), and a draught of 15 feet 9 inches (4.80 m). An R & W Hawthorn two-cylinder horizontal returning-rod steam engine fed by three cylindrical boilers provided 797 indicated horsepower (594 kW) to the single 13 ft (4.0 m) propeller screw. This gave Wild Swan a top speed of 10.3 knots (19.1 km/h; 11.9 mph), which failed to meet the required contract speed. After the first commission the engine was replaced by a Devonport Dockyard two-cylinder horizontal compound-expansion steam engine. She had a maximum range of 1,480 nautical miles (2,740 km; 1,700 mi) at 10 knots (19 km/h; 12 mph). In addition to the steam-driven propeller, the vessel was also barque rigged. The standard ship's company was between 140 and 150.

Armament consisted of two 7-inch (90 cwt) muzzle-loading rifled guns, four 64-pounder guns, four machine guns, and one light gun. Wild Swan and her sister-ship Pelican were re-armed later with two 6-inch (81 cwt) BL guns and six 5-inch (35 cwt) BL guns.

Wild Swan was built by Robert Napier and Sons, of Govan, Scotland. The vessel was laid down on 14 September 1874 as yard number 341. She was launched on 28 January 1876, and commissioned into the Royal Navy on 23 August 1876. Construction costs included £39,643 for the hull, and £11,853 for machinery and equipment.

== Service history ==
Wild Swan patrolled off the coast of Mozambique in 1880, operating against the slave trade. In early 1881, she operated together with Portuguese forces against slavers, landing a Portuguese force at Conducia Bay on 12 February 1881 and supporting them with gun and rocket fire.

Wild Swan was decommissioned and placed on the list of Admiralty vessels for sale in 1900. She was withdrawn from the list and re-fitted in late 1901 as a training ship in Kingstown Harbour for men of the Royal Navy Reserve and coastguards of the North of Ireland stations. She also served as tender to HMS Melampus, coast guard ship at Kingstown.

== Fate ==
Wild Swan became a base ship on 1 May 1904 and was renamed Clyde. She was renamed again in July 1913, becoming Columbine. She was sold for breaking to the Forth Shipbreaking company on 4 May 1920.

== Bibliography ==
- Ballard, G. A. (1939). "British Sloops of 1875: The Larger Ram-Bowed Type". Mariner's Mirror. 25 (January). Cambridge, UK: Society for Nautical Research: 35–49. doi:10.1080/00253359.1939.10657318.
- Clowes, William Laird (1903). The Royal Navy: A History From the Earliest Times to the Death of Queen Victoria: Volume VII. Sampson Low, Marston and Company.
- Colledge, J. J.; Wardlow, Ben & Bush, Steve (2020). Ships of the Royal Navy: The Complete Record of All Fighting Ships of the Royal Navy from the 15th Century to the Present (5th ed.). Barnsley, UK: Seaforth Publishing. ISBN 978-1-5267-9327-0.
- Roberts, John (1979). "Great Britain and Empire Forces". In Chesneau, Roger & Kolesnik, Eugene M. (eds.). Conway's All the World's Fighting Ships 1860-1905. Greenwich, UK: Conway Maritime Press. ISBN 0-8317-0302-4.
- Lyon, David & Winfield, Rif (2004). The Sail and Steam Navy List: All the Ships of the Royal Navy 1815–1889. Chatham Publishing. ISBN 978-1-86176-032-6. OCLC 52620555.
