= Conflict (Steeleye Span album) =

Studio album by Steeleye Span
- Released: May 23, 2025

Steeleye Span chronology
The Green Man Collection (2023)	Conflict (2025)

Conflict is a studio album by Steeleye Span released in 2025, which features the same line-up which recorded the new tracks for the Green Man Collection.
