= Clash of the Titans =

Clash of the Titans may refer to:

- Clash of the Titans (film series), fantasy films adapted from classical mythology
  - Clash of the Titans (1981 film), an epic fantasy based on the myth of Perseus
  - Clash of the Titans (2010 film), an action fantasy remake of the 1981 film
    - Clash of the Titans (video game), based on the 2010 film
    - Clash of the Titans (soundtrack), from the 2010 film
    - Wrath of the Titans, a 2012 action fantasy sequel to the 2010 film
- Clash of the Titans (tour), a metal concert tour with dates in 1990 and 1991
- "Clash of the Titans", a song from the 2012 Luca Turilli's Rhapsody album Ascending to Infinity

== Related ==
- "Cash of the Titans", a 1999 animated television episode of Godzilla: The Series
- Class of the Titans, a Canadian animated television series first aired 2005–2008
- Crash of the Titans, a 2007 video game

== See also ==
- Battle of the Titans (disambiguation)
