= Clash (video game) =

1998 video game

- Developer: Longsoft Multimedia
- Publisher: Arena Games
- Platforms: MS-DOS, Windows
- Release: 1998
- Genre: Turn-based strategy
- Mode: Single-player

Clash is a Polish turn-based strategy game created by Leryx Longsoft, inspired by the Heroes of Might and Magic and Warlords series. It was published in 1998 for MS-DOS and Windows.

== Gameplay ==
The story is based on the legend of the ancient land of Karkhan attacked by wild tribes. Like in Heroes series, player controls cities, which are used to produce units, which are used to explore the map structures and attack enemy units. Cities can be expanded by new building to increase the production capacity and population, required to recruit new military units. In addition to straight military units, game has builders, which are used for all types of construction and mining works, including building new cities and setup trapping pits. Units have tiredness levels. An exhausted unit requires rest and in some cases may rebel. Enemies can be imprisoned, then tortured, executed or bribed. The game has several terrain types, costing different number of movement points to move through, with roads having the lowest cost. Forest terrain can be used to hide units. Up to five players can participate in a single scenario.
