= Osprey-class sloop =

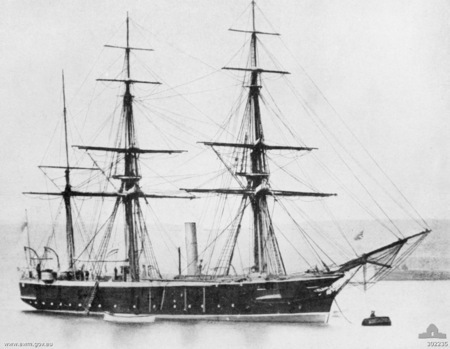
- Penguin

Class overview
- Name: Osprey-class sloop
- Operators: Royal Navy
- Cost: Between £49,217 (Cormorant) and £56,221 (Pelican)
- Built: 1874–1877
- In commission: 1874–1949
- Completed: 5
- Scrapped: 5

General characteristics
- Type: Screw composite sloop
- Displacement: 1,130 long tons (1,150 t)
- Length: 170 ft (51.8 m) (p/p)
- Beam: 36 ft (11.0 m)
- Draught: 15 ft 9 in (4.8 m)
- Depth: 19 ft 6 in (5.9 m)
- Installed power: 666–1,056 ihp (497–787 kW)
- Propulsion: 1 shaft; 1 × 2-cylinder horizontal compound expansion steam engine; 3 × cylindrical boilers
- Sail plan: Barque rig
- Speed: 9–12 knots (17–22 km/h; 10–14 mph)
- Range: 1,480 nmi (2,740 km; 1,700 mi) at 10 knots (19 km/h; 12 mph)
- Complement: 140
- Armament: 2 × 7-inch rifled muzzle-loading guns; 4 × 6.3-inch 64-pounder rifled muzzle-loading guns

The Osprey class was a Royal Navy class of screw-driven sloops built between 1874 and 1877. Nine additional ships were built to a revised design, the Doterel-class sloop. They were the first class of ship in the Royal Navy to use glass scuttles.

== Design ==
They were of composite construction, with wooden hulls over an iron frame. Five ships of the class were built, which had been designed in 1874 by the Royal Navy's Chief Constructor, William Henry White. They were the first ships in the Royal Navy to have glass scuttles instead of solid plug scuttles.

=== Propulsion ===
The original design, as fitted to the first two ships of the class, was a single-expansion returning-rod steam engine, but the power was insufficient, and they failed to meet the contracted speed. Wild Swan and Penguin were re-engined after their first commission to match the better engines in the rest of the class. In the final installation, power was provided by three cylindrical boilers, which supplied steam at 60 pounds per square inch (410 kPa) to a two-cylinder horizontal compound-expansion steam engine driving a single 13-foot-1-inch (3.99 m) screw. The power varied wildly from ship to ship, with Penguin generating only 666 indicated horsepower (497 kW) and Pelican managing nearly twice as much, at 1,056 indicated horsepower (787 kW). Because of this, top speeds ranged between 10 and 12 knots. (Note: The lower power figures may be the trials figures from the initial installation in Wild Swan and Pelican and should be treated with caution.)

=== Armament ===
They were armed with two 7-inch (90cwt) muzzle-loading rifled guns on pivoting mounts, and four 64-pounder muzzle-loading rifled guns (two on pivoting mounts, and two broadside). Four machine guns and one light gun completed the weaponry. Wild Swan and Pelican later had the muzzle-loading guns replaced with two 6-inch (81cwt) breech-loaders and six 5-inch (31cwt) breech-loaders.

=== Sail plan ===
All the ships of the class were provided with a barque rig, that is, square-rigged foremast and mainmast, and fore-and-aft sails only on the mizzen mast.

=== Crew ===
They had a complement of approximately 140 men.

=== Development ===
The design was revised in 1877 and nine ships were ordered to a modified version, the Doterel-class sloop. Identical in many respects, the Doterels lacked the graceful clipper bow of the Ospreys, although they benefited from more power.

== Ships ==
Name	Ship Builder	Laid down	Launched	Commissioned	Fate
Wild Swan	Robert Napier and Sons, Govan	14 September 1874	28 January 1876	23 August 1877	Renamed Clyde in 1904 as the Royal Naval Reserve drill ship at Aberdeen. Renamed Columbine in 1912. Sold for breaking up 4 May 1920
Penguin	Robert Napier and Sons	14 July 1874	25 March 1876	23 August 1877	Sold as a crane hulk 1924, burnt out 13 December 1960
Osprey	Sheerness Dockyard	1875	5 August 1876	19 April 1877	Sold for breaking 29 April 1890
Pelican	Devonport Dockyard	8 March 1875	26 April 1877	29 November 1877	Sold as a supply ship 22 January 1901
Cormorant	Chatham Dockyard	1875	12 September 1877	2 July 1878	Harbour hulk November 1889, renamed Rooke July 1946. Scrapped at Málaga in 1949

== Bibliography ==
- Ballard, G. A. (1939). "British Sloops of 1875: The Larger Ram-Bowed Type". Mariner's Mirror. 25 (January). Cambridge, UK: Society for Nautical Research: 35–49.
- Preston, Antony; Major, John (2007). Send a Gunboat: The Victorian Navy and Supremacy at Sea, 1854–1904 (2nd ed.). London: Conway. ISBN 978-0-85177-923-2.
- Roberts, John (1979). "Great Britain and Empire Forces". In Chesneau, Roger & Kolesnik, Eugene M. (eds.). Conway's All the World's Fighting Ships 1860-1905. Greenwich, UK: Conway Maritime Press. ISBN 0-8317-0302-4.
- Lyon, David & Winfield, Rif (2004). The Sail and Steam Navy List: All the Ships of the Royal Navy 1815–1889. Chatham Publishing. ISBN 978-1-86176-032-6. OCLC 52620555.
