= Southern Africa Support Project =

Anti-apartheid NGO

The Southern Africa Support Project (SASP) was an anti-apartheid, grassroots non-governmental organization. Previously, it was called the Southern African News Collective (SANC) and started after the 6th Pan-African Congress in 1974. SASP raised awareness of issues facing people in Southern Africa, protested, raised funds for refugees, and published a newsletter.

== History ==
The SASP was a grassroots organization developed after the 6th Pan-African Congress (6PAC) held in 1974. After 6PAC, Sylvia I. B. Hill and others returned to Washington, D.C. where they started a group called the Southern African News Collective (SANC). However, members of SANC felt there should be more emphasis on praxis, and started the SASP in June 1978. The organization was partly based at Howard University. SASP raised awareness of the struggles of oppressed people in the area of Southern Africa. They held public events and a "Southern Africa Week" each year that focused on different countries in the region.

Founding members included Kathy Flewellen, Sylvia Hill, Sandra Hill, and Karen Jefferson. Later, Joseph Jordan and Ira Stohlman joined. Jordan helped SASP set up "focus groups, educational campaigns, and demonstrations against U.S. southern Africa policy." Former member of SANC, Sandra Rattley who worked at Howard's radio station, WHUR-FM, broadcast SASP programming. In addition, SASP raised funds to aid refugees in Southern Africa. During the 1985 and 1986 picketing of the South African Embassy, SASP "played a major role."

SASP published a quarterly newsletter called Struggle. Archivist and SASP member, Jefferson, organized the SASP collection of Struggle and other materials, many of which were later donated to Howard University.
