= HMS Cormorant (1877) =

Sloop of the Royal Navy

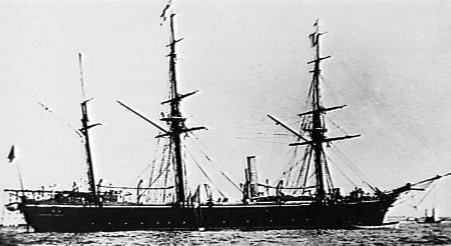
- HMS Cormorant c. 1878

History

United Kingdom
- Name: HMS Cormorant
- Builder: Chatham Royal Dockyard
- Cost: Hull £37,630, machinery £11,587
- Laid down: 1875
- Launched: 12 September 1877
- Commissioned: 2 July 1878
- Decommissioned: Hulked, November 1889
- Renamed: Rooke, July 1946
- Fate: Broken up at Málaga in 1949

General characteristics
- Class & type: Osprey-class screw composite sloop
- Displacement: 1,130 long tons (1,150 t)
- Length: 170 ft (51.8 m) (p/p)
- Beam: 36 ft (11.0 m)
- Draught: 15 ft 9 in (4.8 m)
- Depth: 19 ft 6 in (5.9 m)
- Installed power: 951 ihp (709 kW)
- Propulsion: 1 shaft; 1 × 2-cylinder horizontal compound expansion steam engine; 3 × cylindrical boilers
- Sail plan: Barque rig
- Speed: 11 knots (20 km/h; 13 mph)
- Range: 1,480 nmi (2,740 km; 1,700 mi) at 10 knots (19 km/h; 12 mph)
- Complement: 140
- Armament: 2 × 7-inch rifled muzzle-loading guns; 4 × 6.3-inch 64-pounder rifled muzzle-loading guns

HMS Cormorant was an Osprey-class sloop launched at Chatham on 12 September 1877 and later the receiving ship at Gibraltar. She was renamed Rooke in 1946 and broken up in 1949.

== Design ==
The Osprey class were of composite construction, with wooden hulls over an iron frame. They were designed by the Chief Constructor, William Henry White and five were ordered. Of 1,130 tons displacement and approximately 950 indicated horsepower (710 kW), they were capable of approximately 11 knots (20 km/h; 13 mph) and were armed with two 7-inch muzzle-loading rifled guns on pivoting mounts, and four 64-pounder guns (two on pivoting mounts, and two broadside). They had a crew complement of approximately 140 men.

== Construction ==
Cormorant was laid down at Chatham Royal Dockyard in 1875 and launched on 12 September 1877. She was commissioned on 2 July 1878.

== Operational history ==
The primary purpose of ships of the class was to maintain British naval dominance through trade protection, anti-slavery, and surveying.

On 21 May 1871, Cormorant ran into a vessel in the River Medway and was severely damaged. In 1879 she served on the Australia Station, and in April 1886 she was on the Pacific Station. On 20 July 1887 she became the first vessel to use the newly built graving dock at the Esquimalt Royal Navy Dockyard.

== Fate ==
Cormorant became a receiving ship at Gibraltar in 1889. Lieutenant Arthur Hope Fanshawe was appointed in command of the Cormorant and torpedo boats at Gibraltar on 7 March 1900. Lieutenant Claude Lionel Cumberlege was appointed in command during 1902. She became a flag ship when Rear-Admiral Sir William Acland hoisted his flag on board the Cormorant when he was appointed Admiral Superintendent of the Gibraltar dockyard in October 1902.

She was renamed HMS Rooke in 1946 and was scrapped in 1949, being broken up at Málaga.

== Bibliography ==
- Ballard, G. A. (1939). "British Sloops of 1875: The Larger Ram-Bowed Type". Mariner's Mirror. 25 (January). Cambridge, UK: Society for Nautical Research: 35–49. doi:10.1080/00253359.1939.10657318.
- Colledge, J. J.; Wardlow, Ben & Bush, Steve (2020). Ships of the Royal Navy: The Complete Record of All Fighting Ships of the Royal Navy from the 15th Century to the Present (5th ed.). Barnsley, UK: Seaforth Publishing. ISBN 978-1-5267-9327-0.
- Roberts, John (1979). "Great Britain and Empire Forces". In Chesneau, Roger & Kolesnik, Eugene M. (eds.). Conway's All the World's Fighting Ships 1860-1905. Greenwich, UK: Conway Maritime Press. ISBN 0-8317-0302-4.
- Lyon, David & Winfield, Rif (2004). The Sail and Steam Navy List: All the Ships of the Royal Navy 1815–1889. Chatham Publishing. ISBN 978-1-86176-032-6. OCLC 52620555.
