= HMS Osprey (1876) =

Sloop of the Royal Navy

History

United Kingdom
- Name: HMS Osprey
- Namesake: Osprey
- Builder: Sheerness Royal Dockyard
- Cost: Hull £39,664, machinery £11,674
- Laid down: 1875
- Launched: 5 August 1876
- Completed: 19 April 1877
- Decommissioned: 1889
- Fate: Sold for scrap, 29 April 1890

General characteristics
- Class & type: Osprey-class screw composite sloop
- Displacement: 1,130 long tons (1,150 t)
- Length: 170 ft (51.8 m) (p/p)
- Beam: 36 ft (11.0 m)
- Draught: 15 ft 9 in (4.8 m)
- Depth: 19 ft 6 in (5.9 m)
- Installed power: 946 ihp (705 kW)
- Propulsion: 1 shaft; 1 × 2-cylinder horizontal compound expansion steam engine; 3 × cylindrical boilers
- Sail plan: Barque rig
- Speed: 11 knots (20 km/h; 13 mph)
- Range: 1,480 nmi (2,740 km; 1,700 mi) at 10 knots (19 km/h; 12 mph)
- Complement: 140
- Armament: 2 × 7-inch rifled muzzle-loading guns; 4 × 6.3-inch 64-pounder rifled muzzle-loading guns

HMS Osprey was an Osprey-class sloop built for the Royal Navy in the mid-1870s.

== Bibliography ==
- Ballard, G. A. (1939). "British Sloops of 1875: The Larger Ram-Bowed Type". The Mariner's Mirror. 25 (January). Cambridge, UK: Society for Nautical Research: 35–49. doi:10.1080/00253359.1939.10657318.
- Colledge, J. J.; Wardlow, Ben & Bush, Steve (2020). Ships of the Royal Navy: The Complete Record of All Fighting Ships of the Royal Navy from the 15th Century to the Present (5th ed.). Barnsley, UK: Seaforth Publishing. ISBN 978-1-5267-9327-0.
- Roberts, John (1979). "Great Britain and Empire Forces". In Chesneau, Roger & Kolesnik, Eugene M. (eds.). Conway's All the World's Fighting Ships 1860-1905. Greenwich, UK: Conway Maritime Press. ISBN 0-8317-0302-4.
- Lyon, David & Winfield, Rif (2004). The Sail and Steam Navy List: All the Ships of the Royal Navy 1815–1889. Chatham Publishing. ISBN 978-1-86176-032-6. OCLC 52620555.
