= HMS Conflict (1873) =

History

United Kingdom
- Name: HMS Conflict
- Builder: John Cuthbert, Millers Point, New South Wales
- Launched: 11 February 1883
- In service: August 1873
- Fate: Sold in 1882; Wrecked later that year

General characteristics
- Type: Beagle-class schooner
- Tons burthen: 120 bm
- Length: 77 ft 0 in (23.5 m)
- Beam: 18 ft 6 in (5.6 m)
- Depth of hold: 8 ft 6 in (2.59 m)
- Sail plan: Schooner
- Complement: 27
- Armament: 1 × 12-pounder gun

HMS Conflict was a schooner of the Royal Navy, built by John Cuthbert, Millers Point, New South Wales and launched on 11 February 1873.

== Royal Navy service ==
She commenced service on the Australia Station at Sydney in August 1873 for anti-blackbirding operations in the South Pacific. She was part of a punitive mission in 1879 in the New Hebrides.

In 1880, she sighted the Conflict Group, which bears her name.

She was paid off in 1882 and sold to Captain Thomas Brown.

=== Catalpa incident ===
On 1 April 1876, Conflict visited the port of Fremantle, remaining there until 10 April. Her presence unwittingly threw into confusion an elaborate conspiracy to free six Irish Fenian prisoners on 6 April and transport them to America aboard the whaler Catalpa. The escape was postponed and successfully executed after the gunboat's departure.

== Mercantile service ==
Conflict left Suva for Levuka on 9 October and was wrecked on a reef midway between the two. There were no casualties and the ship was left stranded upright on the reef, signalling that she needed no assistance. By 12 October Captain Brown had returned to Levuka and reported that Conflict was a total loss. (Note: She had been insured for £1000 with the Union Company.)
