= Koro language =

Koro language may refer to:

- Koro language (India) — ISO 639-3 jkr, Sino-Tibetan language
- Manus Koro language, also called Lopohan, (New Guinea) — ISO 639-3 kxr, Austronesian language
- Koro language (Vanuatu) — ISO 639-3 krf, Austronesian language
- Koro, dialect of Maninka language, (Ivory Coast) — ISO 639-3 kfo, Manding language
- Koro, ethnic name for a group of Plateau languages (Nigeria):
  - Jili language — ISO 639-3 mgi
  - Jijili language — ISO 639-3 uji
  - Koro Nulu language — ISO 639-3 vkn
  - Koro Zuba language — ISO 639-3 vkz
  - Koro Wachi language — ISO 639-3 bqv

== See also ==
- Koro (disambiguation)
