= Eggon language =

Plateau language of central Nigeria

Eggon
- Onumu Egon
- Native to: Nigeria
- Region: Nasarawa, Kaduna, Benue states
- Native speakers: 270,000 (2020)
- Language family: Niger–Congo?: Atlantic–Congo; Benue–Congo; Plateau; South; Eggonic; Eggon

Language codes
- ISO 639-3: ego
- Glottolog: eggo1239

Egon
- People: Mo Egon
- Language: Onumu Egon

Eggon (also Egon, Ero, or Mo Egon) is a Plateau language spoken in central Nigeria. It is one of the major language in Nasarawa State.

== Classification ==
The exact classification of the Eggon language has been in dispute and it can be said that this issue remains unresolved. Eggon was first classified by Greenberg (1963) as a Plateau language in his group 5, together with Nungu and Yeskwa. In the revision prepared by Carl Hoffman published in Hansford et al. (1976) a Benue group was set up that combined Greenberg's Plateau 5 and 7 with Jukunoid. The new subgrouping classified Eggon together with Nungu, Ake and Jidda-Abu. This concept of a Benue grouping came from the lexicostatistical studies of Shimizu (1975) who argued against the unity of Greenberg's Plateau and proposed the Benue group. However, in 1983, Gerhardt published a convincing rebuttal of Shimizu's arguments. The latest version of classification of Plateau languages in Gerhardt (1989) adds Yashi to the Eggon subgroup but removes the links with 'Benue' i.e. Tarok and the Jukunoid languages. Blench (2008) classifies Eggon and Ake as the Eggonic group of the Southern branch of Plateau.

== Distribution ==
The main towns of the Eggon people are Eggon, Kagbu, Washo and Wana. They stretch as far south as Lafia and west of Akwanga as far as the railway line. They are bordered on the north by the Mada and to the south by the Migili and the Idoma.

In much of the colonial literature, the Eggon were known as the "Hill Mada" in contrast to the "Plains Mada", the people known as Mada today. The Eggon lived in the Mada hills south of Akwanga in the pre-colonial period, but there is no connection between the groups that would justify these terms, and they have now been discarded.

The exact number of speakers is unknown, but it is unlikely to be less than the estimate of 200,000 given by Sibomana (1985). Ames (1934) gave a figure of 41,276 for the 1920s, but this is likely to have been substantially underestimated. Welmers (1971) estimated 52,000 although this may have been only a projection from Ames.

=== Dialects ===
Eggon is conventionally divided into twenty-five mutually comprehensible dialects, some of which are; Eggon Wangibi, Ikka, Wana, Washo, Wakama, Ogne, Angbashu, Alushi, Alogani, Eva, Nabe, Lizzi, Ezzen, Arikpa, etc. The only author to discuss dialects is Sibomana (1985) whose discussion focuses on Kagbu, which he states is the main dialect. He also cites data from the Eggon dialect. The Benue–Congo Comparative Wordlist (1969, 1972) also gives data from two dialects.

A twenty-sixth variety is Madan-tara, spoken by a group of Eggon east of Eggon. It is said to be impossible to understand without special learning and is sufficiently different from other lects to be effectively a new language. Its precise relationship to the other varieties of Eggon is unknown.

== Phonology ==
Unlike the surrounding languages, Eggon has many consonant clusters that had historically developed via vowel deletion.

=== Consonants ===
		Labial			Alveolar		Post- alveolar	Palatal	Velar			Labio- velar		Glottal
		plain	pal.	lab.	plain	sibilant	Post- alveolar	Palatal	plain	pal.	lab.	plain	pal.	Glottal
Nasal		m			n			ɲ	ŋ			ŋ͡m		
Plosive/ Affricate	voiceless	p	pʲ	pʷ	t	t͡s	t͡ʃ		k	kʲ	kʷ	k͡p	k͡pʲ	
Plosive/ Affricate	voiced	b	bʲ	bʷ	d	d͡z	d͡ʒ		ɡ	ɡʲ		ɡ͡b	ɡ͡bʲ	
Plosive/ Affricate	prenasal	ᵐb			ⁿd	ⁿd͡z	ⁿd͡ʒ		ᵑɡ			ᵑɡ͡b		
Fricative	voiceless	f	fʲ	fʷ	ɹ̠̊˔	s	ʃ							h
Fricative	voiced	v	vʲ	vʷ		z	ʒ							
Fricative	prenasal	ᶬv				ⁿz	ⁿʒ							h̃
Tap	plain				ɾ									
Tap	nasalized				ɾ̃									
Lateral					l									
Approximant	plain		ɥ		ɹ			j				w		
Approximant	nasalized		ɥ̃											

- /p, b/ may be heard as fricatives [ɸ, β] as a second consonant, occurring after a labial stop consonant.
- /k, ɡ/ may be heard as fricatives [x, ɣ] as a second consonant, occurring after a velar stop consonant.

=== Vowels ===
	Front	Central	Back
High	i		u
High-mid	(e)		(o)
Low-mid	ɛ		ɔ
Low		a	

- /ɛ, ɔ/ may be heard as close-mid [e, o] when in stressed positions or in exclamatory words.

== Written language ==
Eggon has no literary standard language. The earliest written material in Eggon appears to be scripture portions from 1937, probably prepared by I.D. Hepburn. The dialect chosen for bible translation is based on the Wana dialect, although it is supplemented by forms from other dialects and so is a sort of synthetic Eggon not based on the speech of a particular group. A hymnbook and 2 readers were prepared, and the translation of the New Testament was completed in 1974. The orthography of the New Testament is somewhat different from the earlier publications. There are however, literature works written in eggon language which provides confidence for one to surely say there is improvement in the written language of eggon. There are also summer lessons to teach and train eggon sons and daughters their language and culture.

Eggon is in use in churches only in remoter regions and it has been displaced by Hausa in all establishments along the main road. However, there is apparently a move to revive the use of Eggon.

== Bibliography ==
The following are the main things that have been written about Eggon. Some have not been published and are only available in mimeo.

- Ames, C.G. (1934 new ed. 1972) Gazetteer of The Plateau Province (Nigeria) Jos Native Administration.
- Gerhardt, L. (1983) The classification of Eggon: Plateau or Benue group? JWAL, 13:37-50.
- Ludzi, T. (1981) The syntax of Eggon B.A. Essay, Department of English, University of Jos.
- Maddieson, I. (1972) The Benue–Congo languages of Nigeria Mimeo, Ibadan.
- Maddieson, I. (n.d.) Verb-nominal contraction in Eggon Mimeo, Ibadan.
- Maddieson, I. (n.d.) The Noun-class system of Eggon Mimeo, Ibadan.
- Maddieson, I. (1982) Unusual consonant cluster and complex segments in Eggon Studies in African Linguistics, Supplement 8:89-92.
- Sibomana, L. (1985) A phonological and grammatical outline of Eggon Afrika und Übersee, 68:43-68.
- Welmers, W.E. (1971) Checklist of African Language and Dialect Names in CTL7:759-900. Ed. T.A. Sebeok. Mouton, The Hague.
