= Sanga, Nigeria =

Sanga Igbunbu
- LGA
- Interactive map of Sanga
- Country: Nigeria
- State: Kaduna State
- Headquarter: Gwantu
- Headquarters: Gbantu

Government
  - Type: Democracy
  - Executive Chairman: Bisallah Malam

Area
  - Total: 1,821 km^{2} (703 sq mi)

Population (2006)
  - Total: 151,485
  - Density: 112.3/km^{2} (291/sq mi)
- 2006 National Population Census
- Time zone: UTC+1 (WAT)

Sanga (also Igbunbu) is a Local Government Area in southern Kaduna State, Nigeria. Its headquarters is in the town of Gbantu (Hausa: Gwantu). The Local Government Council is chaired by Bisallah Malam. It has an area of 1,821 km^{2} and had a population of 151,485 as at the 2006 census. The postal code of the area is 801.

== Boundaries ==
Sanga Local Government Area (LGA) shares boundaries with just a single local government area in southern Kaduna State, Jema'a LGA to the west. The rest of its boundaries are shared with Barkin Ladi, Bokkos, and Riyom LGAs of Plateau State to the east; and Akwanga, Karu, Kokona, and Wamba LGAs of Nasarawa State to the south respectively.

== Geography ==
Sanga Local Government Area has an average temperature of 32 degrees Celsius or 89.6 degrees Fahrenheit and a total area of 781 square kilometres. The two distinct seasons that the Local Government Area experiences are the dry and the rainy seasons, with an average wind speed of 10 km/h or 6 mph throughout the region.

== Population ==
Sanga Local Government Area according to the March 21, 2006 national population census was put at 151,485. Its population was projected by the National Population Commission of Nigeria and National Bureau of Statistics to be 204,500 by March 21, 2016.

== People ==
The people of Sanga Local Government Area include the Nandu, Ningon, Tari, Ayu, Ninzam, Numana, Ninte, Mada (Mœda), Nungu and others of related origin, spoken language and historic affiliations.

== Administrative subdivisions ==
Sanga Local Government have 10 wards and subdivisions; namely

1. Wasa Station Ward
2. Arak Ward
3. Nandu Ward
4. Gwantu Ward
5. Ninzam North Ward
6. Ninzam South Ward
7. Ninzam West Ward
8. Ayu Ward
9. Bokana Ward
10. Aboro Ward
11. Fadan Karshi Ward

== Languages ==
Sanga, being a Local Government Area in southern part of Kaduna state, shares boundaries with Akwanga, in Nassarawa state and Riyom, in Plateau State.

Numana as well as Ninzo are among the main spoken languages in the area, spoken both in Sanga and neighbouring LGAs like Jema'a, in Kaduna State. Mada (Mœda), being one of the languages widely spoken in Akwanga, Kokona, Keffi and Karu Local Government Areas of Nassarawa State and Sanga and Jema'a Local Government Areas of Kaduna state of Nigeria. Some of these Mada communities have settled in Sanga for more than two centuries, there are communities in Sanga that are solely Mada-speaking.

Ayu and Ahwai are also spoken in Sanga LGA.

== Economic activities ==
Sanga LGA is a known area for abundant Agricultural heritage.Crops such as sugar cane, onions, rice and millet are cultivated from their land.

Domestic animals like cows, goats and rams are reared and sold as a means of livelihood for settlers of Sanga. Sanga people also have a skill of Blacksmithing, pottery and craftsmanship to make a living.

== 2014 attacks ==
On 27 June 2014:

In Sanga LGA of Kaduna State, 32 people were killed by gunmen suspected to be Fulani militia ... Amber, a village of about 5,000 people, was ransacked ... In Paa, a village close to Gwantu, the town was attacked ... Ten people were killed. The town is also burnt down ... All Ninzom villages, including Gwantu, the LGA, headquarters of Sanga, were deserted as people ran to police stations, primary and secondary schools in nearby towns and into neighbouring states ... The tense situation in the area was making distribution of relief materials to about 50,000 displaced persons almost impossible."

== Notable people ==
- Comfort Amwe, politician
- Obadiah Mailafia, economist, politician
- Hadiza Sabuwa Balarabe medical doctor, politician

== See also ==
- Mass killings in Southern Kaduna
- SOKAPU
- Zac Zawan
