= Ninzo people =

Ethnic group in central Nigeria

Ninzo
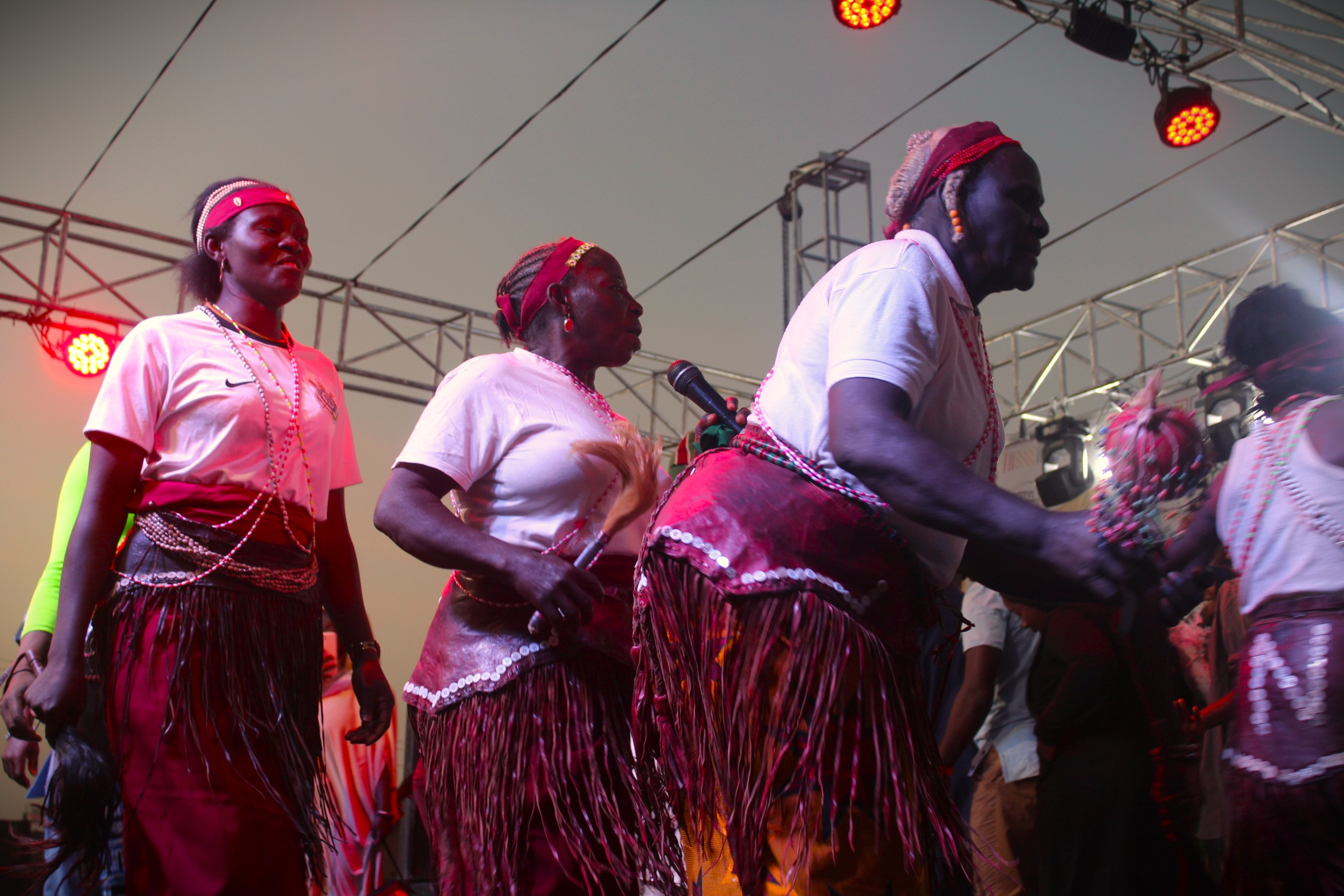
- Ninzo troupe at Chong Dovetail in December 2024

Total population
- 131,000

Regions with significant populations
- Nigeria

Languages
- Ninzo

Religion
- Christianity, Islam, Traditional Religion

Related ethnic groups
- Nikyob-Nindem, Mada, Ham, Koro, Atyap, Berom, Jukun

Ninzo people (also Gbhu and Ninzam), are an ethnic group in the Middle Belt who speak the Ninzo language, a western Plateau language of Nigeria. The speakers of the Sambe language, a now presumed extinct language spoken in a village with same name have now incorporated with the Ninzo.

== Demographics ==
There are approximately 138,000 Ninzo people.

The Ninzo people are found in Sanga LGA of southern Kaduna State and Akwanga LGA of Nasarawa State, Nigeria.

About 64% of the Ninzo are Christian, 31% Muslim and 5% adherents of Traditional religion.

== Politics ==
The Ninzo people are traditionally governed by rulers called the Uchu Ninzo. The Uchu Ninzo, a Second Class Chief, as of 2018 is Uchu (Alh.) Umar Musa. The Ninzo Chiefdom headquarters is at Hate (H. Fadan Wate or Fadan Ninzo).

== Language ==
The Ninzo people speak a Ninzic language, belonging to the western Plateau group of languages.
