= Eggon =

Eggon may refer to:

- Eggon language, a language of Nigeria
- Eggon people, an ethnic group mostly based in North Central Nigeria
- Egon, Nigeria, also known as Nassarawa-Eggon, a Local Government Area in Nasarawa State, Nigeria, centred on the town of Eggon
