= Ninzo =

Ninzo may be,

- Ninzo language, Nigeria
- Ninzo Matsumura, Japanese botanist
