= XNH =

XNH or xnh may refer to:

- XNH, the IATA code for Nasiriyah Airport, Iraq
- xnh, the ISO 639-3 code for Kuan language, China
