= Ninka language =

Plateau language spoken in Nigeria

Ninka
- Aninka
- Nka
- Native to: Nigeria
- Region: Plateau State
- Native speakers: 500 (2020)
- Language family: Niger–Congo?: Atlantic–Congo; Benue–Congo; Plateau; Ninzic; Ninka

Language codes
- ISO 639-3: aqk
- Glottolog: anin1242 Aninka

The Ninka language (Nka, Aninka) is a Plateau language of Nigeria. Mutual intelligibility with the related Gbantu language is low.

== Phonology ==
=== Consonants ===
Consonants of Ninka
	Labial	Alveolar	Palatal	Velar	Labialvelar	Glottal
Nasal	m	n		ŋ		
Plosive	p, b	t, d	c, ɟ	k, g	k͡p	
Fricative	f, v	s, z	ʃ, ʒ	ɣ		h
Aproximant		l	j		w	
Trill		r				

=== Vowels ===
Vowels of Ninka
	Front	Central	Back
Close	i		u
Close Mid	e	(ə)	o
Open Mid	ɛ		ɔ
Mid		a	

/ə/ is an uncertain transcription, and may be a centralized allophone of /i/.
