= Hani people =

Loloish ethnic group in China and Southeast Asia

Hani
Haqniq, Hà Nhì
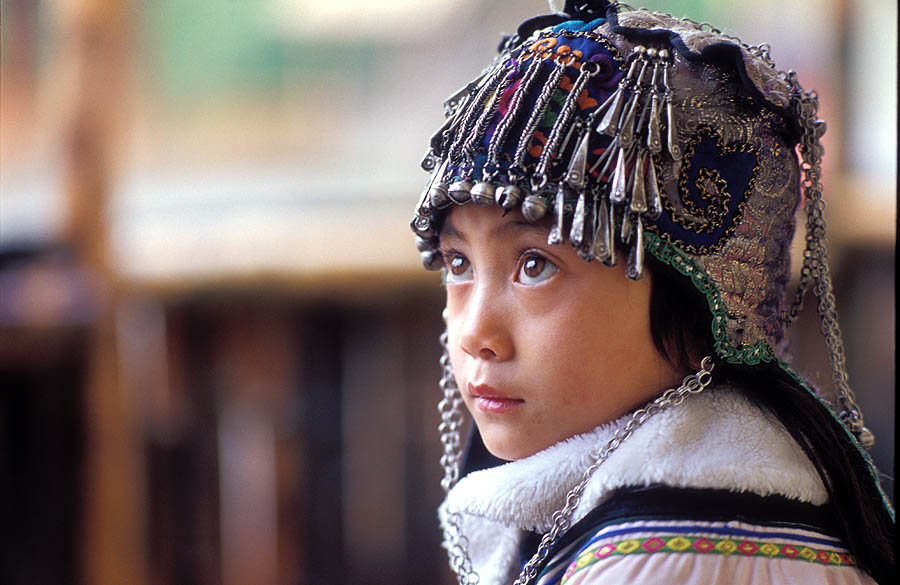
- An ethnic Hani girl with a typical Hani headgear for children, pictured in Yuanyang, Yunnan Province, China.

Total population
- 1,922,250

Regions with significant populations
- China: 1,733,166 (2020)
- Myanmar: 200,000 (2007)
- Laos: 60,000 (2007)
- Thailand: 60,000 (2007)
- Vietnam: 25,539 (2019)

Languages
- Hani • Hanoish languages

Religion
- Animism • Buddhism

Related ethnic groups
- Akha • Yi • Lahu • Karen people

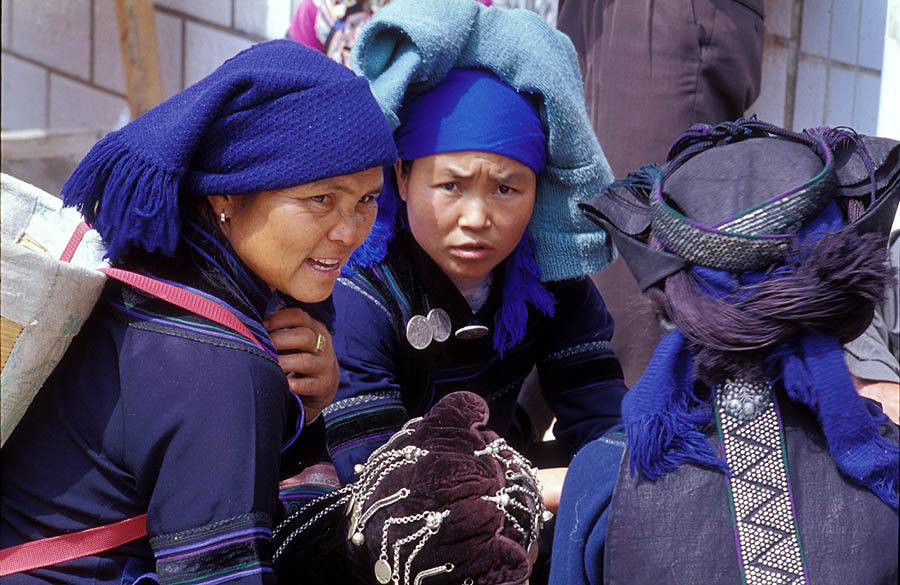
Typical daily attire of ethnic Hani in China, pictured in Yuanyang County, Yunnan Province.

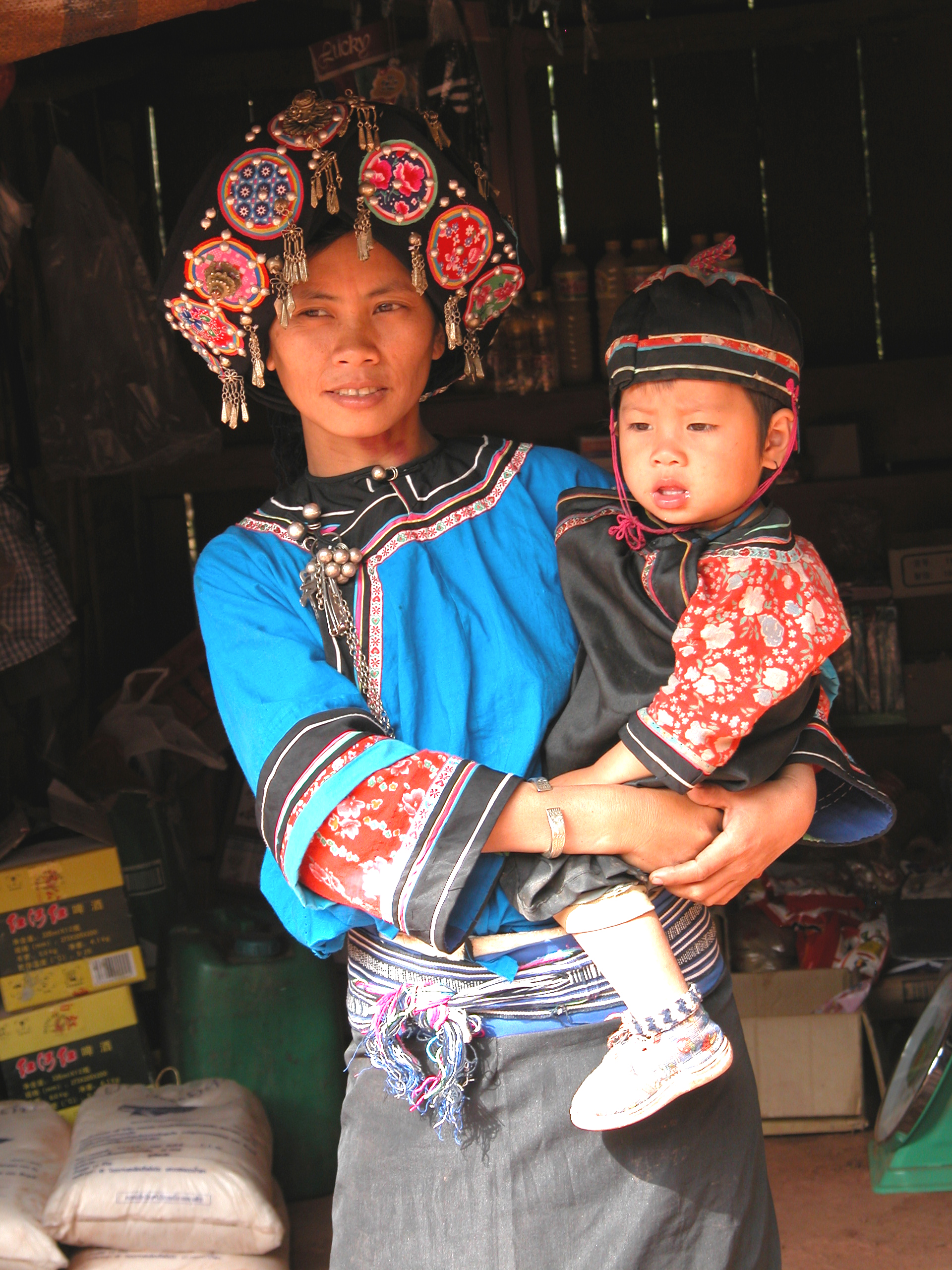
A Ho (Hani) woman and her child in Laos, circa 2003.

The Hani or Ho people (Hani: Haqniq; Chinese: 哈尼族; pinyin: Hānízú; Vietnamese: Người Hà Nhì / 𠊛何贰) are a Lolo-speaking ethnic group in southern China, northern Laos, and northern Vietnam. They form one of the 56 officially recognized nationalities of the People's Republic of China and one of the 54 officially recognized ethnic groups of Vietnam. In Laos, the Hani are more commonly known as Ho.

== Distribution ==
There are 12,500 Hani living in Lai Châu Province and Lào Cai Province of Vietnam. The Ho reside in the mountainous northern regions of Phongsaly Province in Laos, near the Chinese and Vietnamese borders.

=== China ===
Over ninety percent of present-day Hani peoples live in the Province of Yunnan in Southern China, located across the Ailao Mountains, between the Mekong River and the Red River (Yuanjiang river).

Subdivisions of Hani autonomous counties within prefecture-level cities and a prefecture, within Yunnan are:

- Mojiang Hani Autonomous County – Pu'er City (prefecture-level city)
- Jiangcheng Hani and Yi Autonomous County – Pu'er City
- Ning'er Hani and Yi Autonomous County – Pu'er City
- Yuanjiang Hani, Yi and Dai Autonomous County – Yuxi (prefecture-level city)
- Zhenyuan Yi, Hani and Lahu Autonomous County – Pu'er City
- Honghe Hani and Yi Autonomous Prefecture

== Origins ==
The origins of the Hani are not precisely known, though their ancestors, the ancient Qiang tribe, are believed to have migrated southward from the Qinghai–Tibetan plateau prior to the third century CE.

The Hani oral traditions state that they are descended from the Yi people, and that they split off as a separate tribe fifty generations ago. One of their oral traditions is the recital of the names of Hani ancestors from the first Hani family down to oneself.

== Culture ==
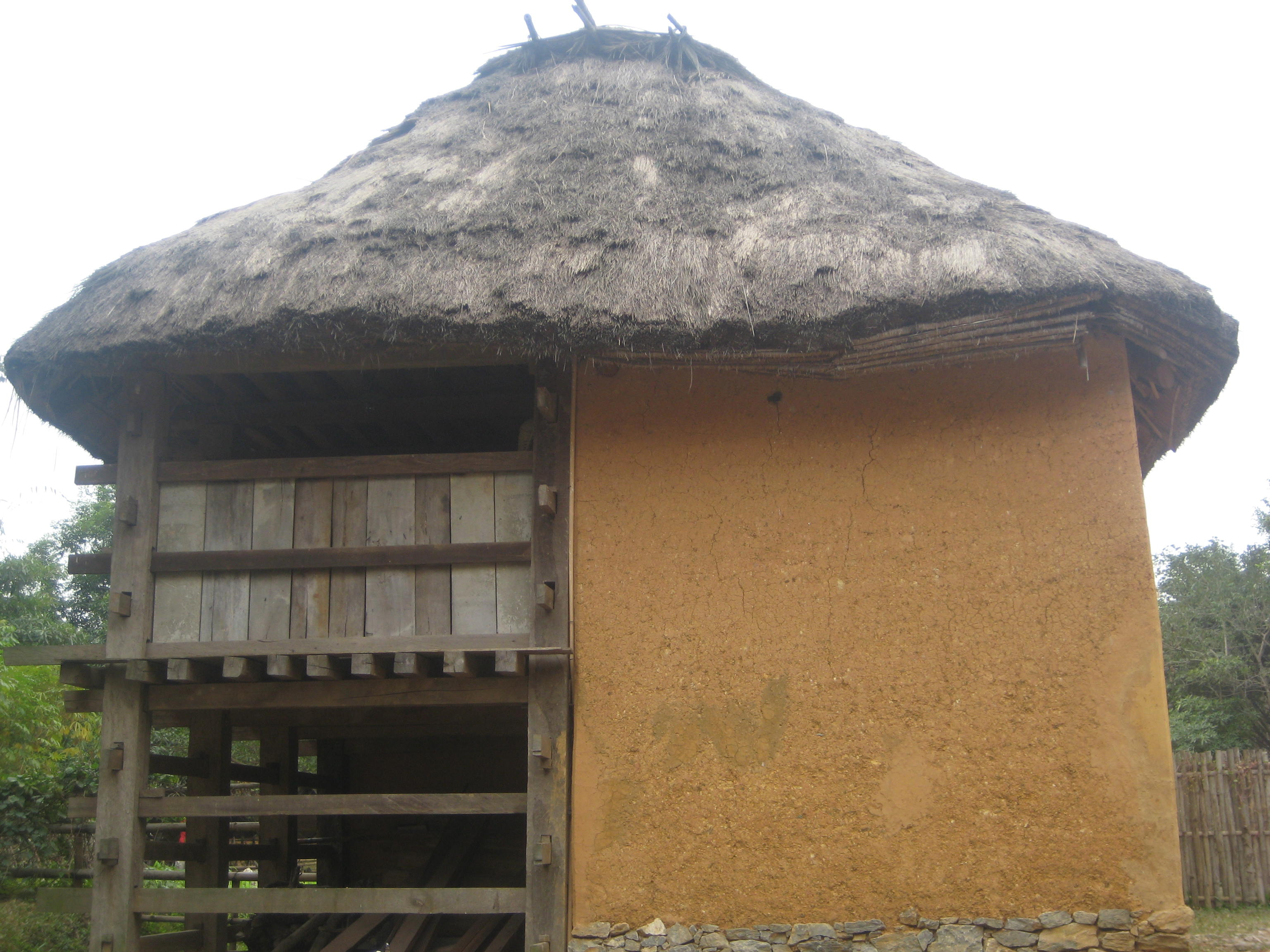
A Hani house in Vietnam.

Hani houses are usually two or three stories high, built with bamboo, mud, stone and wood.

The traditional clothing of the Hani is made with dark blue fabric. The men dress in short jackets and in long wide pants. They also wear white or black turbans. The women dress depending on which clan they belong to. There is no gender difference in the clothing of children under the age of seven.

Hani are known for their vocal polyphonic singing. Eight-part polyphony was recorded in the 1990s. Their traditional musical instruments include an end-blown flute called labi (俄比) and a 3-stringed plucked lute called lahe.

Terraced fields are a feature of their agricultural practices.

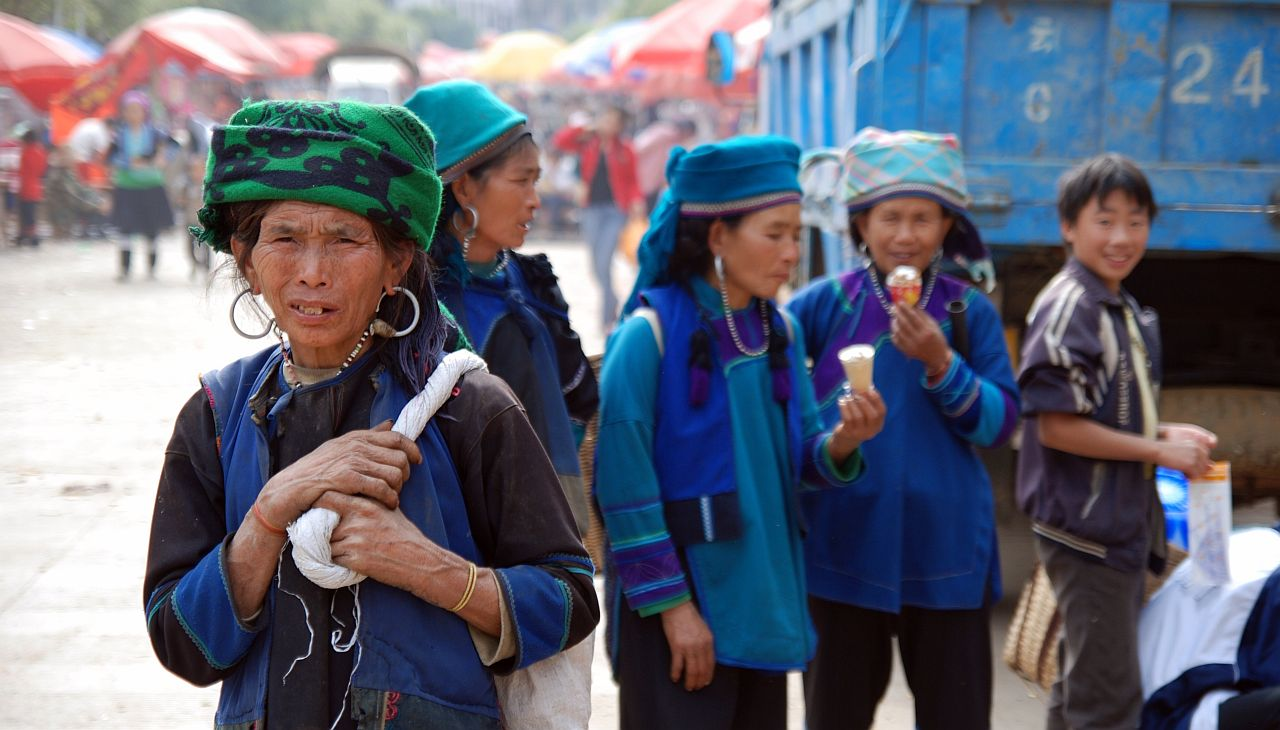
Elderly Hani ladies enjoying ice cream at Laomeng market near Yuanyang, Yunnan Province, China.

=== Religion ===
The Hani are polytheists and they profess a special adoration toward the spirits of their ancestors. They are used to practicing rituals to venerate the different gods and thus to obtain their protection.

The religious hierarchy of the Hani is divided into three main personages: the zuima that directs the main celebrations; the beima, responsible for practicing the exorcisms and the magical rituals; the nima that takes charge of carrying out predictions and to administer the medicinal herbs. This last charge can be performed indistinctly by men and women.

Some Hani also practice Theravada Buddhism.

=== Language ===
The Hani language spoken by many of the Hani belongs to the Lolo-Burmese branch of the Sino-Tibetan language family. Many Hani speak languages related to Lolo-Burmese languages. Oral tradition tells of an ancient written script, tradition says it was lost on the migration from Sichuan. They now use a romanization of the Luchun dialect as a written script.

=== Agricultural practices ===
The Hani people have made contributions to the biodiversity of agroecosystems and mountain landscapes through their extensive traditional knowledge and maintenance of culture. One of the Hani people's most known cultural practices are their cultivated terraced rice paddy. This has been a traditional practice for over 1300 years, creating a unique agroecosystem attracting both tourists and researchers. The terraces are recognized as a UNESCO Heritage Site and are often cited as an example of traditional farming methods.

The Hani began their rice cultivation in terraced hillside fields about 1,300 years ago, when they started to form a sustainable agroecosystem made up of forests, villages, terraced rice paddies, and river systems. The Hani people's rice seed bank now consists of numerous traditional rice seed varieties adapted to the cold and dry conditions of mountainous regions. In 1984, Yunnan Province, Republic of China reported "5285 rice varieties with Yuanyang County alone reporting 196 traditional varieties". This is due to their innovative agricultural practices, such as integrated duck and fish farming, enhanced yield and stabilized agroecosystems. In addition, the use of green manure, such as compositae and crofton weeds, bolstered soil health and combated pests. Their water management skills have sustained the rice terraces for thousands of years by channeling water from forested mountains, without the need for reservoirs. Coupled with the region's hot and humid climate, which frequently produces thick fog, the area remains moist throughout the year. This intricate farming layout, merging terraces, rivers, villages, and forests, embodies the Hani's relationship with nature. As a result, the Honghe Hani Rice Terraces were designated a World Heritage Site in 2013, emphasizing the significance of traditional knowledge in biodiversity conservation.

Culture has been important in preserving the terraced landscape, especially in the face of urbanization. Unlike most farmers in China, who migrate to more developed regions for better wages, the Hani people prefer part-time non-farm jobs close to their homes, returning frequently for traditional events. This employment pattern of the Hani farmers, influenced by their culture, is significant in the continued maintenance of the terraces.

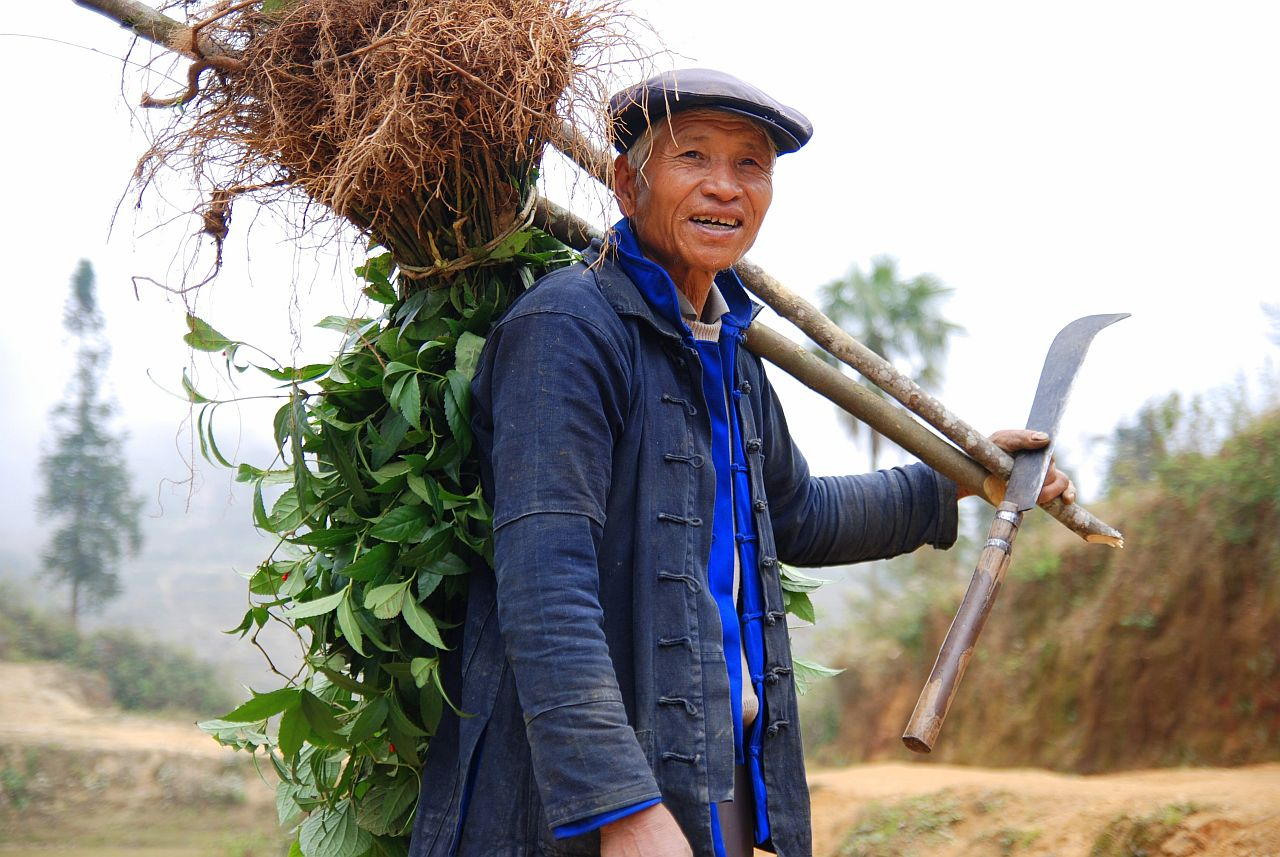
Yuanyang Hani farmer

Challenges still exist within this ancient farming civilization. Fewer people, especially the younger generation, are able to master the traditional terraced farming techniques. In Aichun village, "about 600 people are between 20 and 40 years old, roughly one-fifth of the total population, but only 40 of them know the whole procedure of growing the red rice". Therefore, to prevent the land from being abandoned, remaining villagers work the fields. Additionally, the local government and tourist businesses partner with farmers. Farmers lease their lands to businesses, ensuring organized land management and providing villagers with steady incomes from both lease payments and farming.

== Subgroups ==
=== China ===
According to You Weiqiong (2013:159–160), Hani subgroups were classified as follows in 1954, with 11 primary branches. Respective locations (counties) are listed as well.

- Hani 哈尼
  - Nuobi 糯比: in Xinping, Mojiang
  - Qidi 其弟/期弟: in Honghe, Mojiang, Puer, Zhenyuan, Sipsongpanna
  - Mahei 麻黑: in Puer, Jinggu, Zhenyuan
  - Luomian 罗勉: in Luquan, Wuding
  - Lami 腊米: in Zhenyuan, Mojiang, Honghe, Sipsongpanna
  - Kabie 卡别: in Mojiang
  - Duota 堕塔: in Puer, Xinping, Zhenyuan
  - Sanda 三达: in Sipsongpanna. The Sanda people live in Sanda Township 三达乡 (including in Dazhai 大寨) of Jinghong City, and speak a Yi language with many Hani loanwords (You 2013:136–137). There are 2 elderly women in Dazhai 大寨 who can only remember just over 40 words in the Sanda language. The Chinese name for this group is Sanda 三达, while the Dai name is Lanqian 兰千. The Sanda claim to have migrated from Yibang 倚邦 and Yiwu 易武. Initially, they were classified by the Chinese government as ethnic Yi, but currently they are classified as ethnic Hani.
  - Haini 海尼: in Jinggu
  - Huagu 花姑: in Yuanyang
  - Aka 阿卡: in Puer
- Yeni 耶尼 (exonym: Kaduo 卡多): in Mojiang, Xinping, Puer, Zhenyuan, Jingdong, Jinggu, Sipsongpanna
- Biyue 碧约: in Mojiang, Puer, Honghe, Xinping, Zhenyuan, Simao, Jinggu, Sipsongpanna, Jingdong
- Haoni 豪尼
  - Budu 布都: in Mojiang, Puer, Honghe, Sipsongpanna, Zhenyuan, Jinggu, Simao, Xinping
  - Bujiao 补角: in Sipsongpanna
  - Baike 白壳: in Zhenyuan
- Gecuo 哥搓 (exonym: Kucong 苦聪): in Zhenyuan, Xinping, Jinping, Mojiang, Puer, Honghe, Sipsongpanna, Yuanyang, Jinggu, Jingdong, Shuangbai
- Axiluma 阿西鲁吗 (exonym: Ximoluo 西摩洛): in Mojiang, Puer, Honghe, Sipsongpanna, Zhenyuan, Jinggu, Simao, Jingdong
- Duoni 多尼: in Yuanyang, Jinping
- Amu 阿木: in Mojiang, Zhenyuan, Puer
- Suoni 梭尼 (exonym: Asuo 阿梭): in Jinping
- Luomei 罗美 (exonym: Suobi 梭比): in Xinping
- Bukong 布孔 (exonyms: Heni 合尼, Baihong 白宏): in Mojiang, Honghe, Puer, Sipsongpanna, Zhenyuan, Jingdong

=== Vietnam ===
The Hani of Vietnam consist of the following subgroups (Vu 2010:10–11).

- The Flowery Hani (Hà Nhì Hoa), who are found in Lai Châu Province and are further split into two subgroups.
  - Hà Nhì Cồ Chồ
  - Hà Nhì La Mí
- The Black Hani, who are found in Bát Xát District, Lào Cai Province

In Vietnam, communes consisting almost exclusively of ethnic Hani include Sín Thầu, Chúng Chải, Mù Cả, Ka Lăng, Thu Lủm (all in Mường Tè District), Y Tý and A Lù (all in Bát Xát District). The Hani of A Lù had originally come from Jinping County of Yunnan, China, and had later spread from A Lù to the communes of Lao Chải, Nậm Pung, and Ngài Thầu.

== See also ==
- Honghe Hani and Yi Autonomous Prefecture
- Yuanyang County, Yunnan, with its Hani majority and immense rice terraced mountains
- Akha people, a closely related people who have spread out from Yunnan province into Burma, Vietnam, Laos and Thailand. The Akha that still live in China are seen as part of the Hani people.
- Hanoish languages
