= Spurious languages =

Reputably reported languages later shown to not exist

Spurious languages are languages that have been reported as existing in reputable works, while other research has reported that the language in question did not exist. Some spurious languages have been proven to not exist. Others have very little evidence supporting their existence, and have been dismissed in later scholarship. Others still are of uncertain existence due to limited research. In some cases a purported language is tracked down and turns out to be another, known language. This is common when language varieties are named after places or ethnicities.

== Historical spurious languages ==
Some alleged languages turn out to be hoaxes, such as the Kukurá language of Brazil or the Taensa language of Louisiana. Others are honest errors that persist in the literature despite being corrected by the original authors; an example of this is Hongote, the name given in 1892 to two colonial-era word lists, one of Tlingit and one of a Salishan language, that were mistakenly listed as Patagonian. The error was corrected three times that year, but nonetheless "Hongote" was still listed as a Patagonian language a century later in Greenberg (1987).

In the case of New Guinea, one of the most linguistically diverse areas on Earth, some spurious languages are simply the names of language surveys that the data was published under. Examples are Mapi, Kia, Upper Digul, Upper Kaeme, listed as Indo-Pacific languages in Ruhlen 1987; these are actually rivers that gave their names to language surveys in the Greater Awyu languages and Ok languages of New Guinea.

== Dubious languages ==
Dubious languages are those whose existence is uncertain. They include:

- Oropom (Uganda)
- Nemadi (Mauritania)
- Rer Bare (Ethiopia) – extinct, if it ever existed
- Ladakhi Sign Language – no community to use it

== Spurious according to Ethnologue and ISO 639-3 ==
Following is a list of ISO 639-3 language codes which have been retired since the standard was established in 2006, arranged by the year in which the actual retirement took effect; in most cases the change request for retirement was submitted in the preceding year. Also included is a partial list of languages (with their SIL codes) that appeared at one time in Ethnologue but were removed prior to 2006, arranged by the first edition in which they did not appear.

The list includes codes that have been retired from ISO 639-3 or languages removed from Ethnologue because the language apparently does not exist and cannot be identified with an existing language. The list does not include instances where the "language" turns out to be a spelling variant of another language or the name of a village where an already known language is spoken; these are cases of duplicates, which are resolved in ISO 639-3 by a code merger. It does include "languages" for which there is no evidence or which cannot be found. (In some cases, however, the evidence for nonexistence is a survey among the current population of the area, which would not identify extinct languages such as Ware below.)

SIL codes are upper case; ISO codes are lower case. Once retired, ISO 639-3 codes are not reused. SIL codes that were retired prior to 2006 may have been re-used or may have reappeared as ISO codes for other languages.

=== Removed from Ethnologue, 12th ed., 1992 ===
- Itaem (PNG) [ITM]
- Marajona (Brazil) [MPQ]
- Nemeyam (PNG) [NMY]
- Nereyama, Nereyó (Brazil) [NRY]
- Numbiaí (Orelha de Pau) [NUH]
- Oganibi (PNG) [OGA]
- Tijuana Sign Language (Mexico) [TJS] – added to Ethnologue 1988 by mistake due to a misunderstanding, removed in 1992. No evidence that it ever existed.
- Tyeliri Senoufo [TYE] – the Tyeliri are a caste of leather workers, and do not have their own language
- Wagumi [WGM]
- Zanofil [ZNF] – name of an ethnic group that speaks Yongkom [yon]

=== Removed from Ethnologue, 13th ed., 1996 ===
- Bibasa (PNG) [BHE] – described as "isolate in need of survey" in the 12th ed.

=== Removed from Ethnologue, 14th ed., 2000 ===
- Alak 2 [ALQ] – a mislabeled fragment of a word list
- Dzorgai [DZI], Kortse [KBG], Pingfang [PFG], Thochu [TCJ], Lofuchai (Lophuchai) [LFU], Wagsod [WGS] – old names for Qiangic languages, some of uncertain correspondence to currently recognized names
- Hsifan [HSI] – an ethnic name for people speaking a variety of Qiangic or Jiarongic languages
- Scandinavian Pidgin Sign Language [SPF] – normal inter-language contact, not an established pidgin
- Wutana (Nigeria) [WUW] – an ethnic name

=== Removed from Ethnologue, 15th ed., 2005 ===
- Jiji [JIJ]
- Kalanke [CKN]
- Lewada-Dewara [LWD], incl. Balamula/Mataru
- Lowland Semang [ORB] (though other languages without ISO codes, such as Wila', are also called Lowland Semang)
- Mutús [MUF] – suspected to be the otherwise extinct Timote, e.g. by Adelaar and Muysken (2004)
- Nchinchege [NCQ]
- Nkwak [NKQ] – same as Tanjijili? Also a possible synonym for Kwak (retired in 2015)
- Oso (Southern Fungom) [OSO] – no evidence it is distinct from Fungom and Bum
- Rungi [RUR]
- Wamsak [WBD]

=== Retired 2007 ===
- Miarrã [xmi] – unattested
- Atuence [atf] – an old town name, likely referring to Dêqên
- Amapá Creole [amd]

=== Retired 2008 ===
- Amikoana (Amikuân) [akn]
- Land Dayak [dyk] – language family name, not individual language
- Ware [wre] – Ware is listed as extinct in Maho (2009). When an SIL team in Tanzania were not able to find any evidence of it being spoken, the code was retired.
- Bahau River Kenyah [bwv], Kayan River Kenyah [knh], Mahakam Kenyah [xkm], Upper Baram Kenyah [ubm] – Any current use is likely either Mainstream Kenyah [xkl] or Uma' Lung [ulu]
- Amerax [aex] – prison jargon
- Garreh-Ajuran [ggh] (Borana & Somali)
- Sufrai [suf] – two languages, Tarpia and Kaptiau, which are not close

=== Retired 2009 ===
- Aariya [aay]
- Papavô [ppv] – name given to several uncontacted groups
- Europanto [eur] – a jest

=== Retired 2010 ===
- Chimakum [cmk] – duplicate of Chemakum [xch]
- Beti (Cameroon) [btb] – a group name

=== Retired 2011 ===
- Ayi (China) [ayx]
- Dhanwar (India) [dha]
- Mahei [mja]

=== Retired 2012 ===
- Palu [pbz]
- Pongyong [pgy]
- Elpaputih [elp] – could be either of two existing languages
- Wirangu-Nauo [wiw] – the two varieties which do not form a unit

=== Retired 2013 ===
- Malakhel [mld] – likely Ormuri
- Forest Maninka [myq] – generic

=== Retired 2014 ===
- Gugu Mini [ggm] – a generic name
- Maskoy Pidgin [mhh] – never existed
- Emok [emo] – never existed
- Yugh [yuu] – duplicate of Yug [yug]
- Lamam [lmm] – duplicate of Romam [rmx]

=== Retired 2015 ===
- Mator-Taygi-Karagas [ymt] – duplicate of Mator
- Yiddish Sign Language [yds] – no evidence that it existed
- The [thx] – duplicate of Oy
- Imraguen (Mauritania) [ime]
- Borna (Eborna) [bxx] – perhaps a typo for Boma (Eboma)
- Bemba [bmy] – a tribal name
- Songa [sgo] – a tribal name
- Daza [dzd] – retired in 2015 (with the reason "Nonexistent") but that decision was reversed in 2023, bringing [dzd] back
- Buya [byy]
- Kakauhua [kbf] – Kakauhua/Caucahue is an ethnonym, language unattested – see Alacalufan languages
- Subi [xsj] – duplicate of Shubi [suj] but that decision was reversed in 2019, bringing [xsj] back
- Yangho [ynh] – does not exist
- ǂKxʼaoǁʼae ("=/Kx'au//'ein") [aue] – dialect of Juǀʼhoan [ktz]

=== Retired 2016 ===
- Bhatola [btl]
- Cagua [cbh]
- Chipiajes [cbe] – a Saliba and Guahibo surname
- Coxima [kox]
- Iapama [iap] – uncontacted, and likely either Wayampi or Apalaí
- Runa [rna]
- Savara (Dravidian) [svr]
- Xipináwa [xip] – unattested and may not be distinct
- Yarí [yri] – dialect of Carijona

And several supposed extinct Arawakan languages of Venezuela and Colombia:

- Cumeral [cum]
- Omejes [ome]
- Ponares [pod] – a Sáliba surname, perhaps just Piapoco or Achagua
- Tomedes a.k.a. Tamudes [toe]

Additional languages and codes were retired in 2016, due to a lack of evidence that they existed, but were not necessarily spurious as languages.

=== Retired 2017 ===
- Lua' [prb]
- Rennellese Sign Language [rsi] – a home sign system, not a full language
- Rien [rie]
- Shinabo [snh]
- Pu Ko [puk] – no substantive evidence that the language ever existed.

=== Retired 2018 ===
- Lyons Sign Language [lsg] – no substantive evidence that the language ever existed.
- Mediak [mwx]
- Mosiro [mwy] – a clan name

=== Retired 2019 ===
- Lui [lba]
- Khlor [llo] – duplicate of Kriang [ngt]
- Mina (India) [myi] – Meena, a tribe and caste name in India

=== Retired 2020 ===
- Arma [aoh]
- Tayabas Ayta [ayy]
- Babalia Creole Arabic [bbz] – misunderstanding of a study on Chadian Arabic
- Barbacoas [bpb]
- Cauca [cca]
- Chamari [cdg]
- Degaru [dgu]
- Eastern Karnic [ekc]
- Khalaj [kjf]
- Lumbee [lmz]
- Palpa [plp]
- Tapeba [tbb] – a recently created indigenous ethnicity, not a language

=== Retired 2021 ===
- Bikaru [bic] – posited based on a poor elicitation of ordinary Bisorio

=== Retired 2022 ===
- Warduji [wrd] – no evidence of a distinct language spoken in Warduj
- Pini [pii]
- Judeo-Tunisian Arabic [ajt] – duplicate of Tunisian Arabic [aeb]

=== Retired 2023 ===
- Tupí [tpw] – duplicate of Tupinamba [tpn]
- Karipúna [kgm] – duplicate of Palikur [plu]
- Koibal [zkb] – duplicate of Khakas [kjh]
- Salchuq [slq]
- Parsi [prp] – dialect of Gujarati [gu]

=== Retired 2024 ===
- Dek (Cameroon) [dek] – duplicate of Suma [sqm]

== Spurious according to Glottolog ==
Glottolog, maintained at the Max Planck Institute for Evolutionary Anthropology in Leipzig, classifies several languages, some with ISO 639 codes, as spurious/unattested in addition to those retired by the ISO. These include:

Language Name	ISO 639-3	Details
ǃKhuai		Duplicate of ǀXam
Adabe	adb	Dialect of Wetarese, taken to be a Papuan language
Adu	adu	Duplicate of Okpamheri
Agaria	agi	all likely candidates in the area already have ISO codes
Ahirani	ahr	Khandeshi dialect
Anasi	bpo	Misidentification of Nisa
Arakwal	rkw	An ethnic group, not a language
Baga Kaloum	bqf	Should be subsumed into Koga variant
Baga Sobané	bsv	Should be subsumed into Sitemu variant
Bainouk-Samik	bcb	Split from Bainouk-Gunyuño due solely to national border
Bhalay	bhx	A caste rather than a language
Bubia	bbx	
Buso	bso	Duplicate of Kwang
Chetco	ctc	Indistinguishable from Tolowa
Chuanqiandian Cluster Miao	cqd	
Con	cno	
Gengle	geg	Mutually intelligible with Kugama
Gowlan	goj	A caste rather than a language
Gowli	gok	A caste, not a language
Guajajara	gub	Mutually intelligble with Tenetehara
Ihievbe	ihi	Ibviosakan dialect
Inku	jat	Main article: Jatki language SIL named jat entry Jakati, Ethnologue 16 through 28 versions suggest spoken by 29,300 people in Ukraine, but a Ukrainian linguist Aleksej Barannikov contested it as maybe covered by Vlax Romani. An alternative name "Jat" may refer to some (at least two) village-lived dialects in Afghanistan, supported by Aparna Rao and Charles Kieffer, Glottolog currently supports Charles' investigate to name Inku, consider it related with Saraiki.
Ir	irr	duplicate of Ong-Ir
Judeo-Berber	jbe	According to Glottolog, Jewish Berbers speak no differently than Muslim Berbers. However, there are claims that this is not true.
Kang	kyp	
Kannada Kurumba	kfi	
Katukína	kav	Dialect of the same language as Kanamari
Kayort	kyv	Duplicate of Rajbanshi
Kisankasa	kqh	
Kofa	kso	Duplicate of Bata
Kpatili	kpm	Purportedly the original language of the Kpatili people, who now speak Gbayi, but any such language is unattested
Kuanhua	xnh	Insufficient attestion; possibly Khmu
Kuku-Mangk	xmq	
Lama (Myanmar)	lay	Duplicate of Nung
Lambichhong	lmh	Yakkha language; name exists due to form errors
Lang'e	yne	
Laopang	lbg	Undocumented Loloish language
Loarki	lrk	Also covered under Gade Lohar (gda)
Lopi	lov	Undocumented Loloish language
Lumba-Yakkha	luu	Yakkha language; name exists due to form errors
Mawa (Nigeria)	wma	listed in Ethnologue but SIL has no evidence it ever existed.
Munda	unx	Duplicate of Mundari
Ndonde Hamba	njd	Dialect of Makonde language
Norra	nrr	Duplicate of Nung
Northwestern Fars	faz	all likely candidates in the area already have ISO codes
Odut	oda	Extinct and unattested Nigerian language
Old Turkish	otk	
Ontenu	ont	A place rather than a language
Phangduwali	phw	Yakkha language; name exists due to form errors
Pisabo	pig	Asserted to be both unattested and non-distinct by Glottolog
Pokangá	pok	Spurious misidentification of Waimajã
Potiguára	pog	Glottolog argues is likely Old Tupi
Puimei Naga	npu	Indistinct variety of one of the related languages
Putoh	put	
Quetzaltepec Mixe	pxm	
Rufiji	rui	
Skagit	ska	duplicate of Lushootseed
Snohomish	sno	duplicate of Lushootseed
Southern Lolopo	ysp	Confused entry duplicating either Lolopo or Miqie
Southwestern Nisu	nsv	Likely confused additional Nisu language (spoken in same locations as Southern Nisu)
Syerna Senoufo	shz	Should be subsumed into Sìcìté Sénoufo
Tawang Monpa	twm	Chinese and Indian name for Dakpakha
Tetete	teb	Intelligible with Siona
Thu Lao	tyl	Duplicate of Dai Zhuang
Tingui-Boto	tgv	Ethnic group speaking Dzubukuá
Welaung	weu	Place name, not a language
Yarsun	yrs	
Yauma	yax	
