= VKN (disambiguation) =

VKN may refer to:

- V. K. N., a prominent Malayalam writer
- Vinukonda railway station, the station code VKN
- vkn, the ISO 639-3 code for Koro Nulu language
- Viking Air, the ICAO code VKN
