= Nko =

Nko may refer to:

- N'Ko language, a standardized unified form of several Manding languages
  - N'Ko script, used to write N'ko
- Nkɔ language, a language of Nigeria
- NKO (Russian: Narodny Komissariat Oborony), the highest military department of the Soviet Union from 1934 to 1946
