= WRE =

WRE, or wre, may refer to:

- Weapons Research Establishment, an Australian military program now part of the Defence Science and Technology Group
- Weekday Religious Education, a program of religious education in some American public schools
- Western Roman Empire
- Windows Recovery Environment, a feature of the Microsoft Windows operating system
- WRE, the IATA code for Whangarei Airport on the North Island, New Zealand
- wre, the ISO 639-3 code for the Ware language, an extinct language once spoken near Lake Victoria in East Africa
- WRE, the National Rail code for Wrenbury railway station in Cheshire, UK

See also
