= AIK (disambiguation) =

AIK may refer to:

== Sports ==
- AIK or Allmänna Idrottsklubben, a professional sports club from Stockholm, Sweden
- AIK Fotboll, a Swedish professional football club competing in Allsvenskan
- AIK IF, the ice hockey department of sports club AIK based in Stockholm, Sweden

== Other uses ==
- Ake language (ISO 639-3 code "aik")
- Aiken Regional Airport (IATA code AIK)
- Windows Automated Installation Kit
