= Zac Zawan =

Village in Karshi District, Nigeria

Zac Zawan Zac Zawan
- Village
- Location within Nigeria
- Coordinates: 09°25′00″N 08°33′00″E
- Country: Nigeria
- State: Kaduna State
- LGA: Sanga
- District: Karshi
- Time zone: UTC+01:00 (WAT)
- Climate: Aw

Zac Zawan (Hausa: Sabon Gidan Zawan) is a village community in Karshi District of Sanga Local Government Area, southern Kaduna state in the Middle Belt region of Nigeria. The postal code for the village is 801105. The area has an altitude of about 588 meters (1,929 feet) above sea level and a population of about 536,068.

== Education ==
Universal Basic Education Zac Zawan is a public primary school located in Karshi Ward, Sanga Local Government Area, Kaduna State. The school provides basic formal education to pupils from Karshi and surrounding communities. The school operates under the oversight of the Kaduna State Universal basic Education.

== See also ==
- List of villages in Kaduna State
