= Eggon people =

Central Nigerian tribe

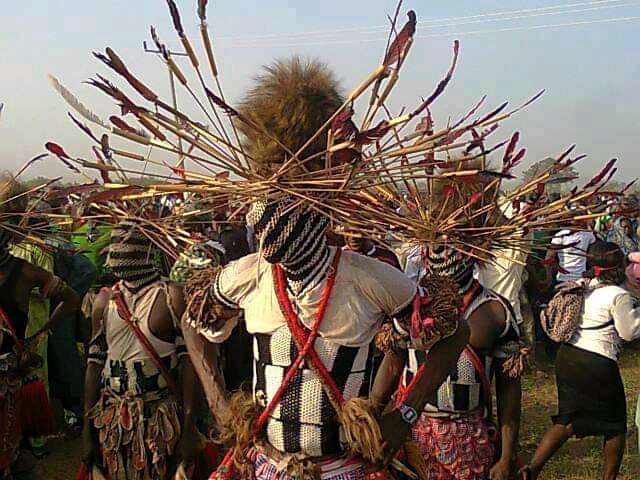

Total population
- 200,000+

Regions with significant populations
- Nassarawa, Plateau

Languages
- Eggon (native language), Hausa (regional language), West African Pidgin English, English (colonial languages)

Religion
- Christianity, Islam, Traditional African religions

Related ethnic groups
- Hausa, Mada Doma, Alago, Kanuri, Jukun, Rindre, Eloyi

The Eggon (pronounced "EH-gone", also Egon, Ero, or Mo Egon, sometimes referred to as Mada or Madan Dutse meaning Hill Mada by the Hausa) are an ethnic group mostly based in Middle Belt Nigeria (namely Nassarawa and Plateau states).

Autonyms for singular: abegon single individual; plural: moa ègón people in general.

They are a diverse but culturally homogenous people, numbering around 200,000 or more as of an estimate in 2016. They existed through most of their pre-colonial history as a decentralised and deeply independent society, having their own distinct culture, language and history like most minor societies in the West African Savannah. Their native language is the Eggon language, which most Eggon people still speak today; they also speak Hausa, the regional language of Northern/North Central Nigeria, and English after British colonisation.

== History ==
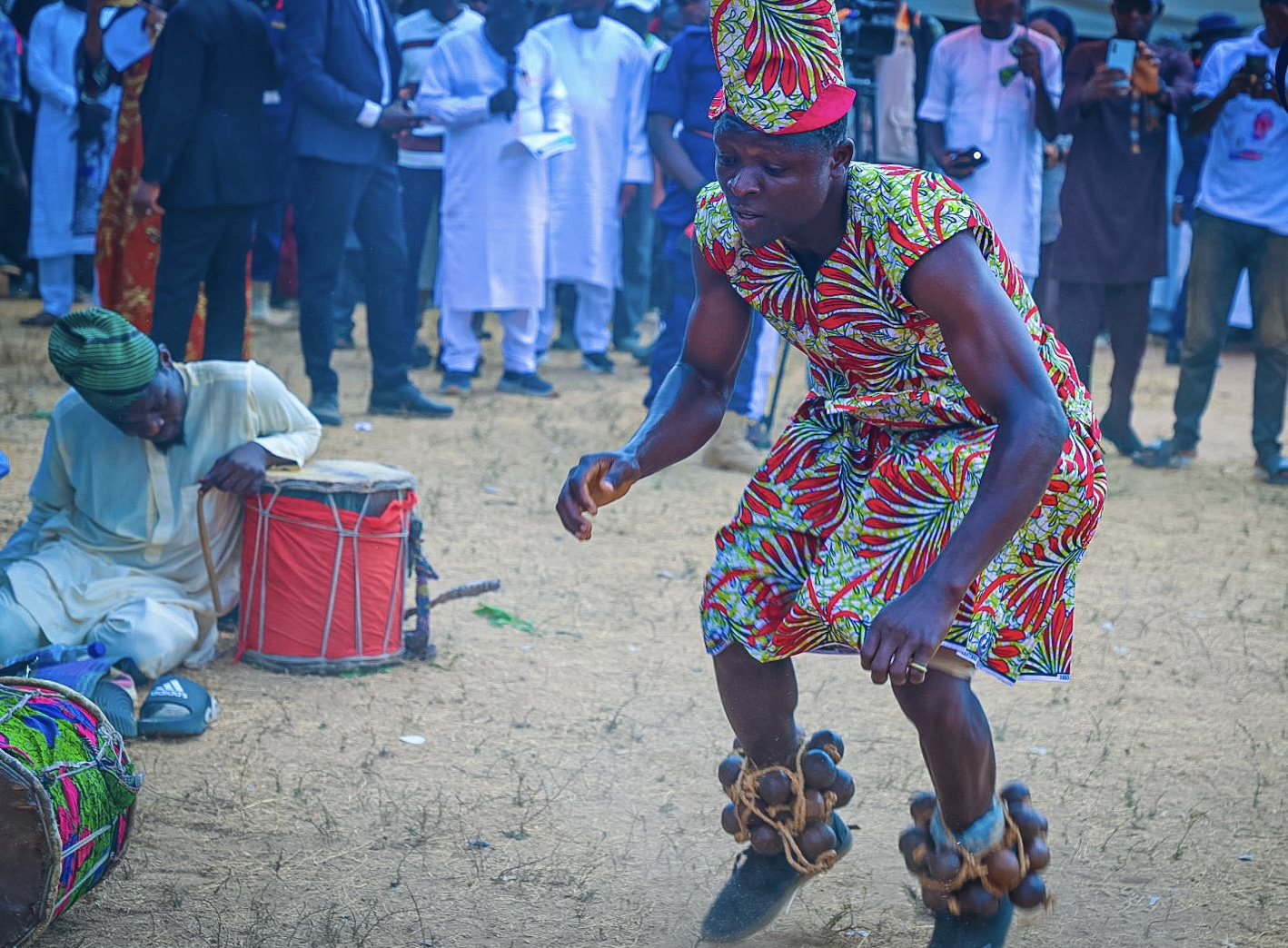
Eggon traditional dancer

Since the Eggon people were made up of different clans, tribes and houses, they didn't refer to themselves with any generic name. Instead, they identified with and were divided into 3 major clans: Anzo, Eholo, and Anro.

While they are called Madan Dutse, by the Hausa, they are not to be confused with the Mada people of central Nigeria. But they do share similarities in language, culture and moral systems with the Mada and Rindre of Akwanga Local Government Area. The Eggon are located around thirty miles southwest of the Jos Plateau, sharing borders in the north and east with the Mada and Rindre respectively.

The name "Eggon" derives from the hill where most of them lived before migrating to the lower plains later on. The word roughly means "a good sense of hearing or perception ability".
