= Aariya language =

Possible spurious language of India

Aariya
- (spurious?)
- Native to: India
- Region: Madhya Pradesh
- Ethnicity: Aariya
- Language family: unclassified

Language codes
- ISO 639-3: (aay deprecated in 2009)
- Glottolog: aari1240

Aariya is an apparently spurious language of Madhya Pradesh, India.

According to a submission made in 2007 to the ISO 639-3 Registration Authority which resulted in having language code withdrawn, the only reference for the language was a 1970 work entitled A bibliographical Index of the Lesser Known Languages and Dialects of India and Nepal by Richard Hugoniot, which relied on information provided by the Madhya Pradesh Department of Tribal Welfare from 1964 and indicated the presence of the Aariya as a scheduled tribe.

Nothing is known of the language. Recent studies have failed to reveal either any speakers of the language or anyone with knowledge of the language. Whether this means the language never existed or if the population that spoke it was wiped out is not clear.
