= Gbetsu language =

Plateau language spoken in Nigeria

Gbətsu
- Native to: Nigeria
- Region: Plateau State
- Language family: Niger–Congo?: Atlantic–Congo; Benue–Congo; Plateau; Ninzic; Gbətsu

Language codes
- ISO 639-3: None (mis)
- Glottolog: None

Gbətsu is a Plateau language of Nigeria.
