= Ayu language =

Plateau language of Nigeria

Ayu
- Native to: Nigeria
- Region: Kaduna State
- Native speakers: 800 (2003)
- Language family: Niger–Congo?: Atlantic–Congo; Benue–Congo; Plateau; Ninzic ?; Ayu

Language codes
- ISO 639-3: ayu
- Glottolog: ayuu1242
- ELP: Ayu

Ayu is a minor and endangered Plateau language of southern Kaduna State, Middle Belt Nigeria. Its subsequent classification is uncertain, but it may be one of the Ninzic languages (Blench 2008). It is not being passed on to many children.

Ethnologue (22nd ed.) lists Ayu locations as Agamati, Amantu, Ambel, Anka, Arau, Digel, Gwade, Ikwa, Kongon, and Tayu villages in Sanga, Nigeria.
