= Koro Zuba language =

Nupoid language of Nigeria

Koro Zuba
- Native to: Nigeria
- Region: Abuja Capital Territory, near Zuba
- Native speakers: 10,000–12,000 (2020)
- Language family: Niger–Congo?: Atlantic–Congo; Volta–Niger; noi; Nupoid; Nupe–Gbagyi; Koro Zuba

Language codes
- ISO 639-3: vkz
- Glottolog: koro1324

Koro Zuba is a Nupoid language of Nigeria. It is one of several languages which go by the ethnic name Koro. However, it has very low (~ 7%) lexical similarity with Koro Nulu (a.k.a. Koro Ija), which speakers consider to be a variant of the same language (along with Jijili language) due to ethnic identity, and instead is closest to Dibo.
