= Kanufi language =

Plateau language spoken in Nigeria

Kanufi
- Anib
- Native to: Nigeria
- Region: Kaduna State
- Native speakers: (10,400 cited 2000)
- Language family: Niger–Congo?: Atlantic–Congo; Benue–Congo; Plateau; Ninzic; Kanufi

Language codes
- ISO 639-3: kni
- Glottolog: kanu1277

Kanufi (Anib) is a Plateau language of Nigeria.
