= Palpa language (Indo-Aryan) =

Purported language of Nepal

Palpa
- Native to: Nepal
- Language family: Indo-European: Indo-Iranian; Indo-Aryan; Northern; Eastern Pahari; Nepali; Palpa

Language codes
- ISO 639-3: (plp deprecated in 2020 due to spurious)
- Glottolog: palp1242

Palpa was the name of a purported language or dialect of western Nepal, apparently associated with Palpa District. A version of the New Testament was published in this language by the Serampore Mission Press in 1827. In a 1916 volume of the Linguistic Survey of India, G.A. Grierson reproduced an extract of this text, with a one-page description of its grammar "more as a curiosity than as evidence of an existing form of speech", as it had been "impossible to check its correctness" due to the absence of other specimens. He considers the language of this text to be a form of Nepali, but with some similarities to the Kumaoni spoken to the west in India.

Palpa had an ISO 639-3 language code, plp, until it was retired in 2020 because of the continued absence of evidence for the existence of a separate language entity.

It is not to be confused with the Palpa dialect of the Sino-Tibetan Western Magar language, also spoken in this area.
