= Ganiang =

Township in Yunnan, China

Coordinates: 32°54′N 101°40′E

Ganiang is a township of Yuanyang County, Honghe Prefecture, Yunnan. Ganiang Village, Shuijingwan Village, Dawu Village, Jijudi Village, Longke Village, Fenggang Village and Kulu Village are located in Ganiang.
