= South Plateau languages =

Niger–Congo language subgroup of Nigeria

South Plateau
- Jilic–Eggonic
- Geographic distribution: Nigeria
- Linguistic classification: Niger–Congo?: Atlantic–Congo; Benue–Congo; Plateau; South Plateau
- Subdivisions: Eggonic; Jilic

Language codes
- ISO 639-3: –
- Glottolog: jili1242

The South Plateau languages, also known as Jilic–Eggonic, are spoken in central Nigeria. Eggon has 150,000 speakers and Jili (Lijili, Mijili) perhaps 100,000.

== Classification ==
Jilic (Koro) and Eggonic are clearly valid groups. Their connection was proposed in Blench (2006, 2008).

- South Plateau
  - Eggonic
    - Eggon
    - Ake
  - Jilic (Koro)
    - Jili (Lijili)
    - Jijili (Tanjijili)

Two additional languages, Koro Nulu (a.k.a. Koro Ija) and Koro Zuba (collectively known as "Ija-Zuba") are ethnically Koro. However, they have very low lexical similarity with each other (~ 7%), and Koro Zuba at least appears to be a Nupoid language.

== Names and locations ==
Below is a list of language names, populations, and locations from Blench (2019).

Language	Branch	Dialects	Alternate spellings	Own name for language	Endonym(s)	Other names (location-based)	Other names for language	Exonym(s)	Speakers	Location(s)
Ake	Eggonic		Akye, Aike						354 (Meek 1925); 3000 (Blench 1999)	Nasarawa State, Lafia LGA
Eggon	Eggonic	25 dialects are locally recognised although the status of these is unclear	Egon	onumu Egon	Mo Egon		Mada Eggon, Hill Mada		52,000 (Welmers 1971)	Nasarawa State, Akwanga, Nassarawa–Eggon and Lafia LGAs
Koro Ija	Jilic								One village	Federal Capital Territory, near Lambata
Koro Zuba	Jilic								One village	Federal Capital Territory, near Zuba
Jili	Jilic		Megili, Migili (orthographic form)	Lijili	Jijili (singular), Mijili (plural)		Koro of Lafia		50,000 (1985 UBS)	Plateau State, Lafia and Awe LGAs
Jijili	Jilic			Tanjijili	Ujijili pl. aJijili			Koro Funtu of Kafin Koro, Koro of Shakoyi	About 8 settlements and probably some 8000 speakers (1999)	Niger State, Chanchaga and Suleija LGAs, north from the road from Minna to Suleja around Kafin Koro
