= Panzhihua Township =

Town in Yunnan, China

Coordinates: 23.3906°N 104.2231°E

Panzhihua
- Chinese: 攀枝花
- Postal: Panchihhwa
Transcriptions
Standard Mandarin
- Hanyu Pinyin: Pānzhīhūa
- Wade–Giles: P'an^{1}-chih^{1}-hua^{1}

Panzhihua (Chinese: 攀枝花; pinyin: Pānzhīhūa) is a township (乡) located in Yuanyang County, Honghe Prefecture, Yunnan Province in Southwest China. It is near Xinjie (Old Yuanyang).
