= Yuanyang County, Yunnan =

Yuanyang County 元阳县
- County
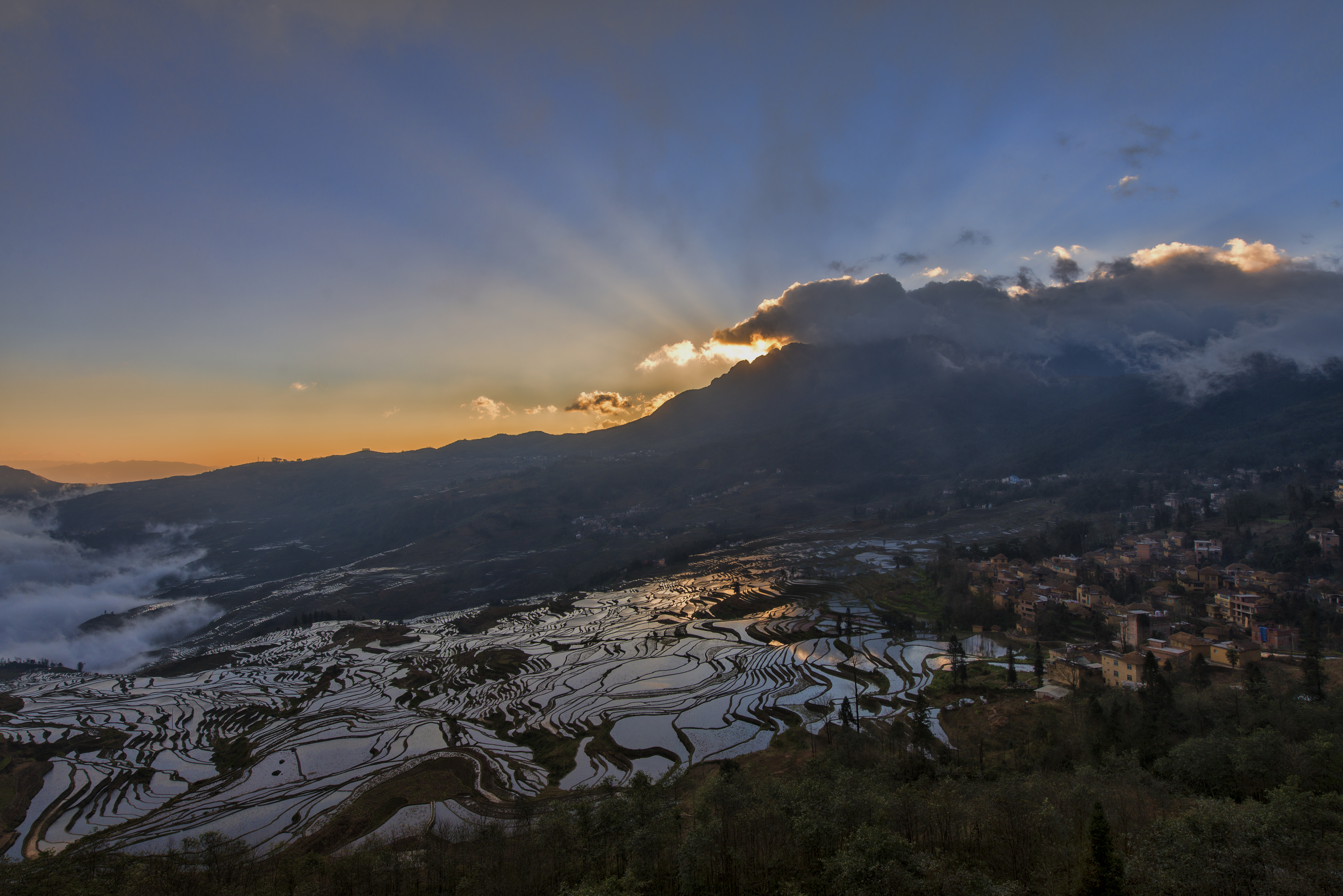
- Sunrise over Duoyishu

- Location of Yuanyang County in Honghe Prefecture within Yunnan province

- Location of the seat in Yunnan
- Coordinates (Yuanyang County government): 23°13′12″N 102°50′07″E
- Country: People's Republic of China
- Province: Yunnan
- Autonomous prefecture: Honghe

Area
  - Total: 2,292 km^{2} (885 sq mi)

Population
  - Total: 370,000
  - Density: 160/km^{2} (420/sq mi)
- Time zone: UTC+8 (CST)
- Postal code: 662400
- Area code: 0873
- Website: www.hhyy.gov.cn

Cultural Landscape of Honghe Hani Rice Terraces
UNESCO World Heritage Site
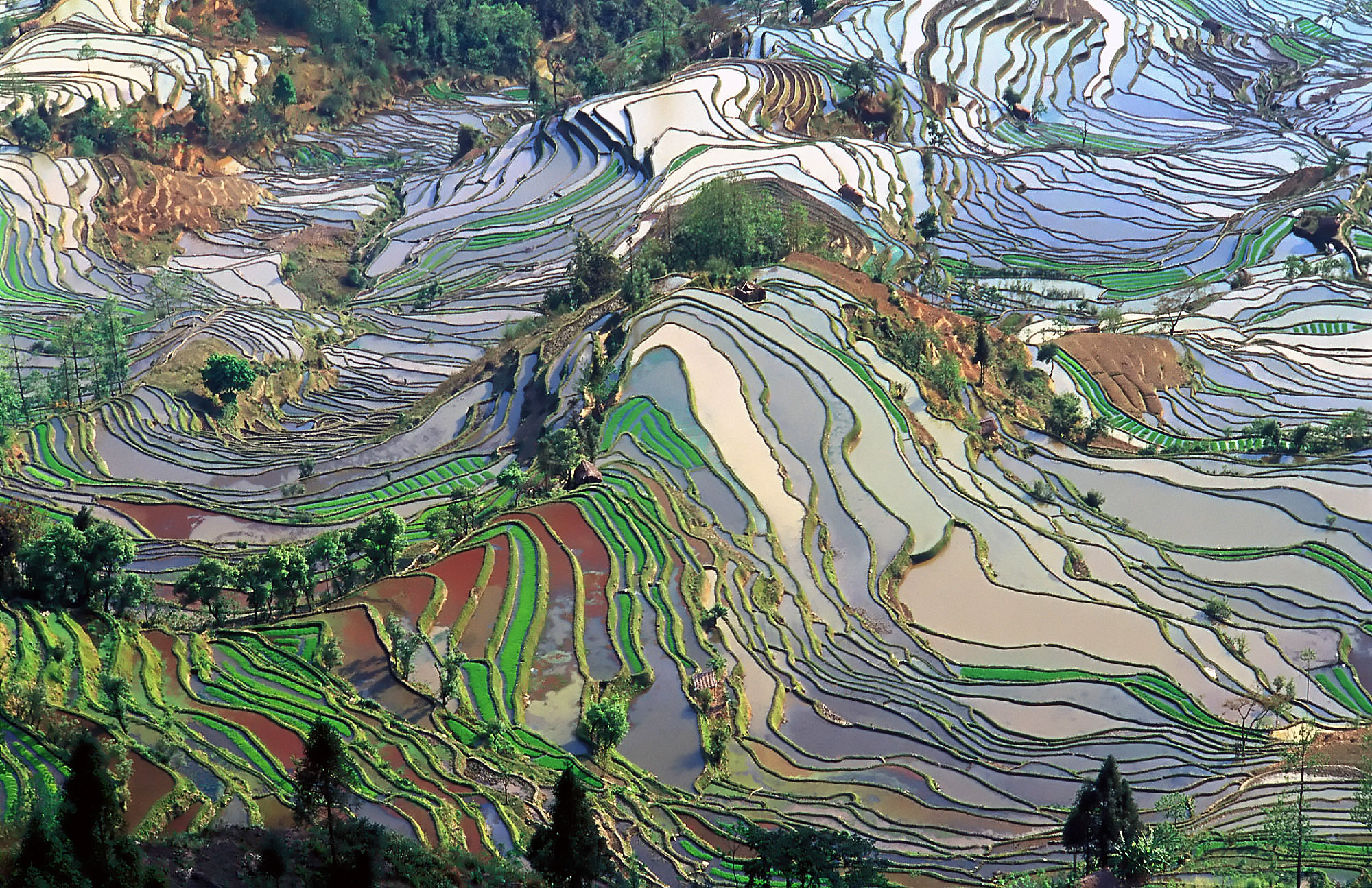
- Terraced rice fields in Yuanyang County
- Interactive map of Cultural Landscape of Honghe Hani Rice Terraces
- Criteria: Cultural: (iii)(v)
- Reference: 1111
- Inscription: 2013 (37th Session)
- Area: 16,603.22 ha (64.1054 sq mi)
- Buffer zone: 29,501.01 ha (113.9040 sq mi)
- Coordinates: 23°5′35.8″N 102°46′47.93″E

Yuanyang County (simplified Chinese: 元阳县; traditional Chinese: 元陽縣; pinyin: Yuányáng Xiàn; Hani: Yeiqyaq) is located in Honghe Prefecture in southeastern Yunnan province, China, along the Red River. It is well known for its spectacular rice-paddy terracing. In 2013, part of the county formed the Honghe Hani Rice Terraces World Heritage Site, the 45th World Heritage Site in China.

== Overview ==
It covers an area of 2,200 km^{2} (850 sq mi) and has a population of approximately 365,000 (2002), of which 88% belong to ethnic minorities and 95% is associated with agriculture. The majority of the inhabitants of the county are from the Hani ethnic group. The GDP of Yuanyang county in 2021 was 9,312 million Yuan. The administrative seat of the county is the town of Nansha (a.k.a. New Yuanyang) down in the Red River valley at an elevation of 240 meters. It is situated 12 km (7.5 mi) towards the north-east of the former administrative seat Xinjie (a.k.a. Old Yuanyang or just Yuanyang) to which it is connected by a 27 km (17 mi) long twisting mountain road. To the south of Old Yuanyang, the town of Panzhihua is positioned near the top of another major valley of rice-terraces. There are a total of 928 settlements in Yuanyang county, 826 of them being inhabited by only one single ethnic group.

The town of Old Yuanyang is a Hani minority settlement atop a ridge of the Ailao mountain range at an elevation of around 1570 metres. It is a popular destination with photographers due to the vast areas of nearby mountains which have been cultivated into terraced rice paddies for at least the past 1300 years by the Hani people. Despite its scenic and cultural attractions, mass tourism has not developed in this region, mainly due to its remote location, lack of a nearby airport and road conditions.

The terraced areas of interest to visitors are mainly found between 1000 and 2000 metres above sea level. The winter temperatures here, although never freezing, are such that they only support one rice crop a year. After the harvest, from mid-September till mid-November depending on the elevation, the terraces are filled with water until April, when planting begins.

The vast majority of the ethnic minority women in Yuanyang county still wear traditional clothes as their daily attire. The main ethnic group is the Hani who share the region with several other minorities such as the Yi and Miao. Market days in the villages tend to be very colourful when the different minority groups in the vicinity, each in their own traditional costume, come together to trade and socialise.

== Administrative divisions ==
Yuanyang County currently has 3 towns and 11 townships.

3 towns

- Nansha (南沙镇)
- Xinjie (新街镇)
- Niujiaozhai (牛角寨镇)

11 townships

- Shalatuo (沙拉托乡)
- Ganiang (嘎娘乡)
- Shangxin Cheng (上新城乡)
- Xiaoxinjie (小新街乡)
- Fengchunling (逢春岭乡)
- Daping (大坪乡)
- Panzhihua (攀枝花乡)
- Huangmaoling (黄茅岭乡)
- Huangcaoling (黄草岭乡)
- Ezha (俄扎乡)
- Majie (马街乡)

== Geography ==
Yuanyang county lies at an altitude ranging from 140 along the Red River up to nearly 3000 metres above sea level in the Ailao mountains and is situated about 50 km (31 mi) north of the border with Vietnam.

The climate of Yuanyang county is mainly central sub-tropical monsoon with wet summers and dry winters. Average temperatures range from 26 Celsius down in the Red river valley to 4 Celsius in the upper reaches of the mountains.

The closest large towns to the west of Yuanyang county are Shiping and Yuanjiang. Gejiu is the major town to the north-east and also the capital of Honghe prefecture. 70 km (43 mi) directly to the north of Yuanyang lies Jianshui, a small city with interesting monuments. A few hours to the south-east of Yuanyang is Luchun, another major Hani minority settlement turned modern city.

Due to recent highway construction, Old Yuanyang can now be reached in about seven hours by direct bus from Yunnan's capital Kunming, situated 300 km (190 mi) to the north of the county, a trip which only a few years ago, would take 10 hours or more. Buses also connect Yuanyang with the town of Hekou and the border crossing with Vietnam (6 hours).

== Climate ==
Yuanyang a humid subtropical climate (Köppen Cfa). Adjacent to hot semi-arid climate (Köppen BSh), subtropical monsoon climate (Köppen Cwa) and tropical wet and dry climate (Köppen Aw).

Climate data for Yuanyang, elevation 232 m (761 ft), (1991–2020 normals, extremes 1981–present)
Month	Jan	Feb	Mar	Apr	May	Jun	Jul	Aug	Sep	Oct	Nov	Dec	Year
Record high °C (°F)	35.0 (95.0)	37.8 (100.0)	41.3 (106.3)	43.4 (110.1)	44.5 (112.1)	40.5 (104.9)	42.8 (109.0)	40.9 (105.6)	42.2 (108.0)	39.4 (102.9)	37.0 (98.6)	35.6 (96.1)	44.5 (112.1)
Mean daily maximum °C (°F)	23.1 (73.6)	26.2 (79.2)	29.5 (85.1)	33.3 (91.9)	34.8 (94.6)	35.2 (95.4)	34.3 (93.7)	34.5 (94.1)	33.7 (92.7)	30.9 (87.6)	28.2 (82.8)	24.0 (75.2)	30.6 (87.2)
Daily mean °C (°F)	17.4 (63.3)	19.7 (67.5)	23.1 (73.6)	26.4 (79.5)	28.4 (83.1)	29.4 (84.9)	28.7 (83.7)	28.4 (83.1)	27.4 (81.3)	25.1 (77.2)	21.5 (70.7)	18.1 (64.6)	24.5 (76.0)
Mean daily minimum °C (°F)	13.8 (56.8)	15.5 (59.9)	18.6 (65.5)	21.6 (70.9)	23.7 (74.7)	25.5 (77.9)	25.2 (77.4)	24.7 (76.5)	23.5 (74.3)	21.5 (70.7)	17.4 (63.3)	14.3 (57.7)	20.4 (68.8)
Record low °C (°F)	4.5 (40.1)	7.0 (44.6)	8.3 (46.9)	14.3 (57.7)	15.8 (60.4)	20.1 (68.2)	22.0 (71.6)	20.1 (68.2)	16.0 (60.8)	12.7 (54.9)	8.6 (47.5)	3.7 (38.7)	3.7 (38.7)
Average precipitation mm (inches)	34.5 (1.36)	15.8 (0.62)	33.0 (1.30)	80.1 (3.15)	106.7 (4.20)	133.2 (5.24)	142.6 (5.61)	115.1 (4.53)	62.8 (2.47)	64.6 (2.54)	37.5 (1.48)	23.0 (0.91)	848.9 (33.41)
Average precipitation days (≥ 0.1 mm)	4.8	3.4	5.9	10.7	14.1	15.3	18.5	16.4	10.3	9.0	5.2	3.9	117.5
Average relative humidity (%)	70	65	63	64	67	72	77	77	74	74	73	71	71
Mean monthly sunshine hours	132.9	154.6	171.5	187.0	194.3	147.7	129.1	146.6	146.1	132.2	158.8	130.4	1,831.2
Percentage possible sunshine	39	48	46	49	47	37	31	37	40	37	48	39	42
Source: China Meteorological Administrationall-time extreme temperatureall-time October record

Climate data for Xinjie Town, Yuanyang (1991–2018 normals)
Month	Jan	Feb	Mar	Apr	May	Jun	Jul	Aug	Sep	Oct	Nov	Dec	Year
Mean daily maximum °C (°F)	16.6 (61.9)	19.2 (66.6)	22.6 (72.7)	24.4 (75.9)	25.6 (78.1)	25.0 (77.0)	25.3 (77.5)	25.6 (78.1)	24.7 (76.5)	22.2 (72.0)	19.7 (67.5)	16.5 (61.7)	22.3 (72.1)
Daily mean °C (°F)	11.9 (53.4)	13.8 (56.8)	16.9 (62.4)	19.7 (67.5)	21.2 (70.2)	22.1 (71.8)	21.9 (71.4)	21.1 (70.0)	20.7 (69.3)	18.5 (65.3)	15.2 (59.4)	12.2 (54.0)	17.9 (64.3)
Mean daily minimum °C (°F)	7.1 (44.8)	8.3 (46.9)	11.1 (52.0)	14.3 (57.7)	16.8 (62.2)	18.5 (65.3)	18.5 (65.3)	18.0 (64.4)	16.8 (62.2)	14.8 (58.6)	10.7 (51.3)	7.9 (46.2)	13.6 (56.4)
Average precipitation mm (inches)	20.8 (0.82)	19.3 (0.76)	30.5 (1.20)	61.3 (2.41)	120.9 (4.76)	217.2 (8.55)	253.1 (9.96)	224.9 (8.85)	99.7 (3.93)	80.7 (3.18)	32.1 (1.26)	18.0 (0.71)	1,178.5 (46.39)
Source: Baidu

== Ethnic groups ==
- Hani people
- Miao people
- Yao people
- Dai people
- Zhuang people
- Yi people
- Han Chinese

Vertical distribution of the various ethnic minority groups
The Hani and Yi, the creators of the monumental rice terraced mountains which have made Yuanyang famous, are the original inhabitants of these regions. Both their languages belong to the Tibeto-Burman group. Their villages can mainly be found between 1300 and 1600 metres above sea level.

The Dai moved here 700 years ago, and the Zhuang 400 years ago. Both their languages belong to the Tai–Kadai language group. Their villages are situated in the warmer areas below 700 metres elevation, near and along the rivers. Their main crop is rice grown in paddy fields.

The Miao and Yao (of the Hmong–Mien language group) are fairly recent arrivals to the region, only settling here 200 and 270 years ago. Their villages are in the cooler and drier upland areas, between 1600 and 1800 metres above sea level, where they grow maize.

The Yuanyang County Gazetteer (1990:625, 633) lists the following ethnic groups and subgroups.

- Hani
  - Luobi 罗碧
  - Luomian 罗缅
  - Awu 阿邬
  - Haoni 豪尼
  - Guohong 郭宏
  - Duoni 多尼/堕尼
  - Baihong 白宏
  - Asong 阿松
- Yi
  - Nisu 尼苏
  - Bula 卜拉 (Phula)
  - Alu 阿鲁
  - Muji 姆基
- Miao
- Yao
- Zhuang
- Dai

Hani ethnic subgroups are located in the following townships of Yuanyang County.

- Gouhouzhi 苟厚支: in Zhongjiaozhai 中角寨, Shalatuo 沙拉托, Ezha 俄扎, Majie 马街, Huangcaoling 黄草岭; Malizhai 麻栗寨; Guangpingzhai in Tuanjie Township 团结乡广平寨
- Alou 阿楼: in Duoyishu 多衣树, Xinjie 新街
- Loubi 楼比 and Loumei 楼美: in Ganiang 嘎娘, Xincheng 新城, Xinjie 新街, Fengshuling 逢树岭, Daping 大坪
- Asu 阿苏: in Zha'e 扎俄, Huangcaoling 黄草岭, Huangmaoling 黄茅岭
- Duoni 多尼: in Niujiaozhai 牛角寨; Zha'e 扎俄

== Transportation ==
There is no train or plane available in Yuanyang. Taking a long-distance bus is the best way to get to Yuanyang. Normally there are three buses travelling from Kunming to Yuanyang every day. The buses depart from Kunming South Bus Station and arrive at Yuanyang Bus Station which take about 6 hours. There are also buses travelling to Yuanyang from Gejiu, Mengzi, Jianshui. For tourists who would like to transfer from Jianshui, they could take a train from Kunming to Jianshu and then take a long-distance bus from Jianshui to Yuanyang.

== Gallery ==
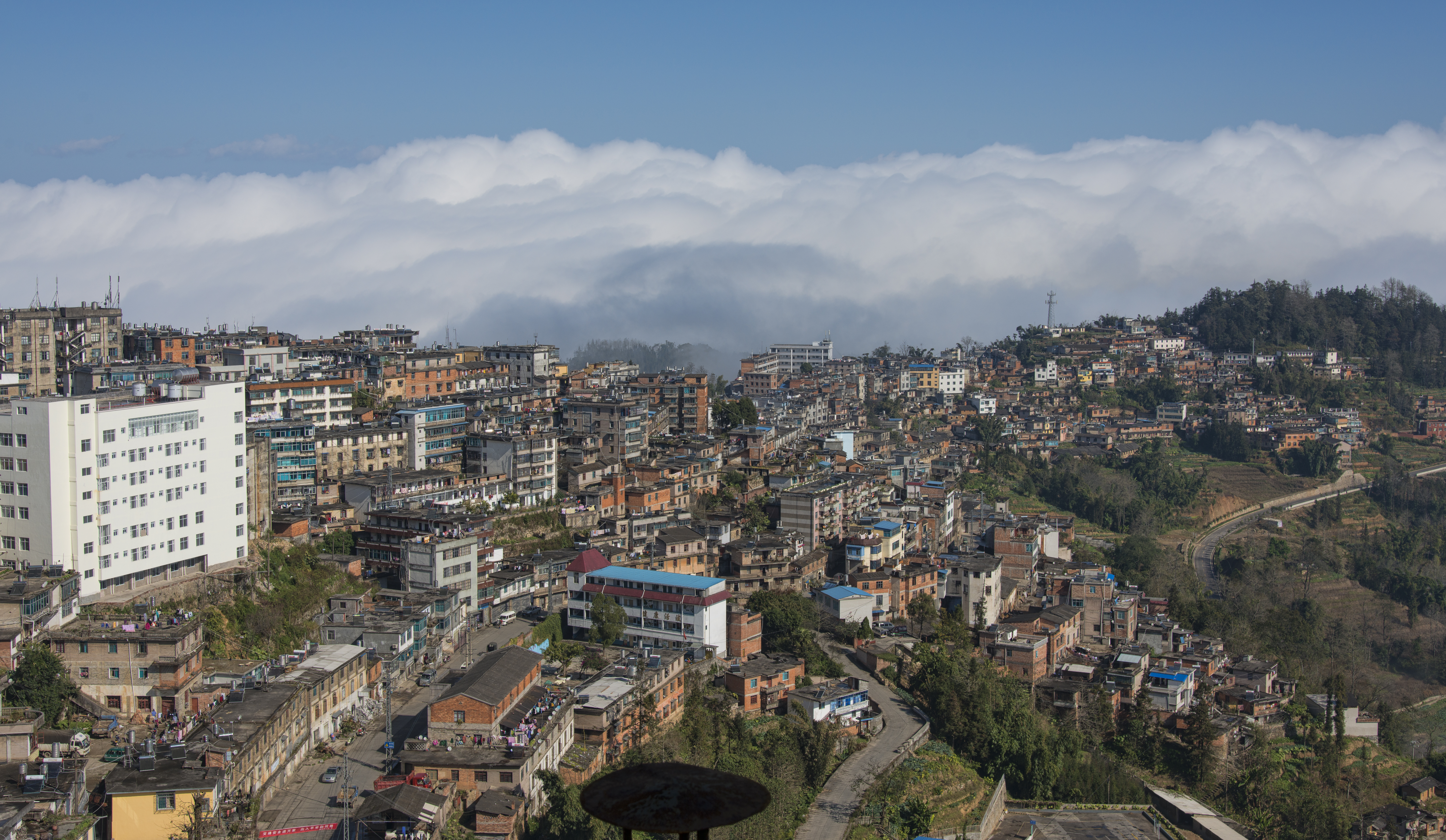
Part of the town of old Yuanyang

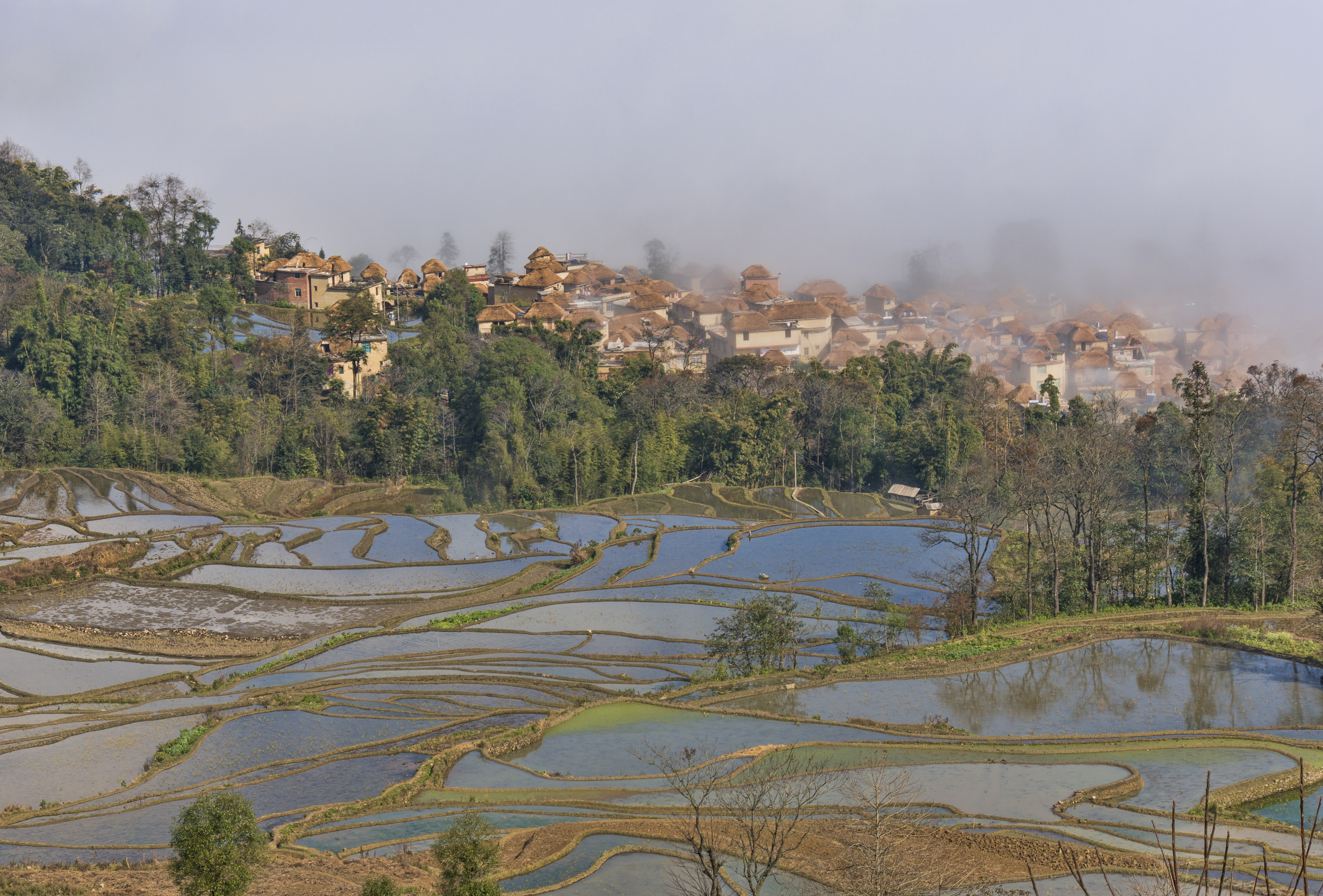
Mist over Qingkou

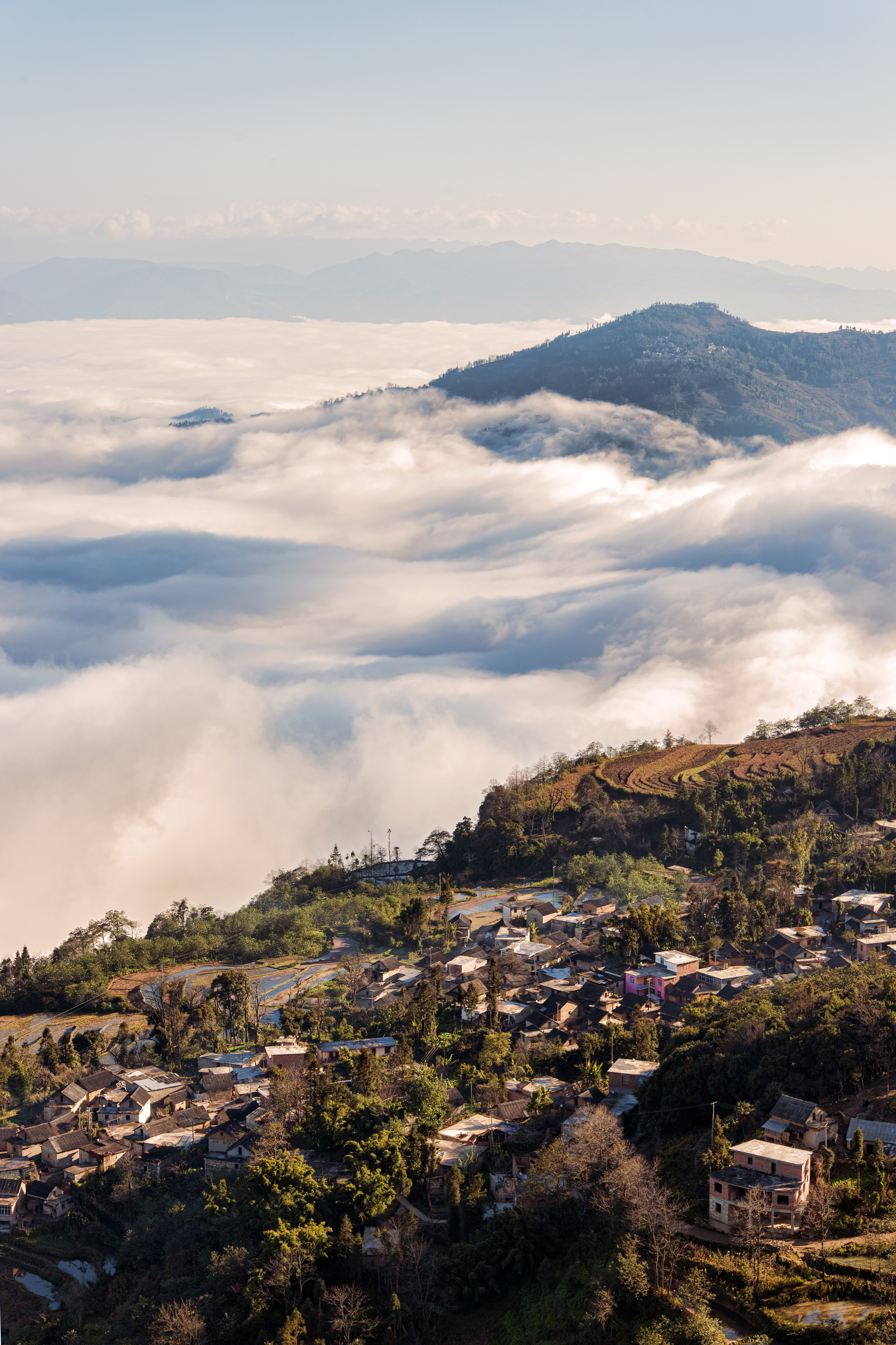
Sea of clouds surrounding Paozhuzhai

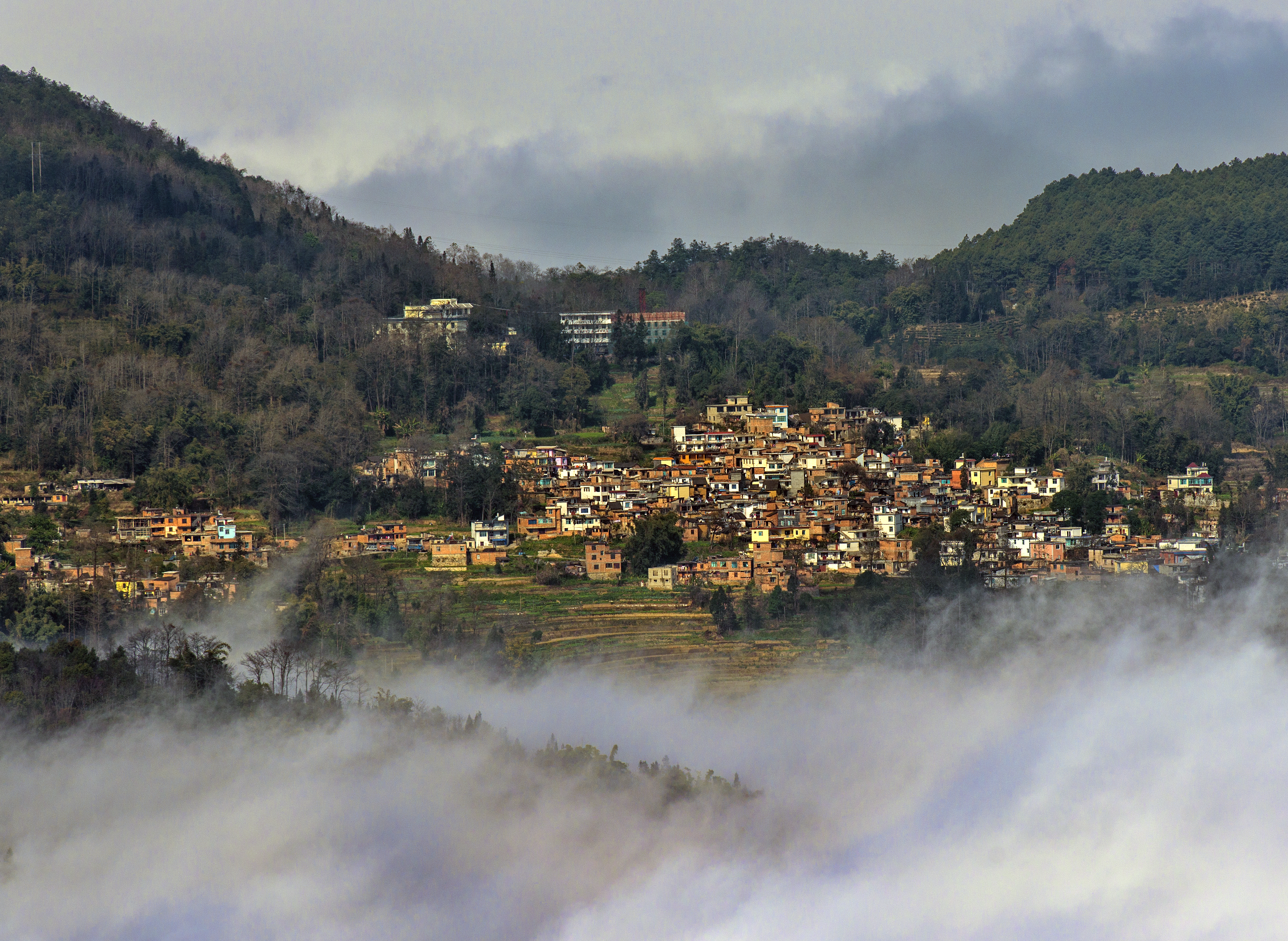
A village as seen from Bada

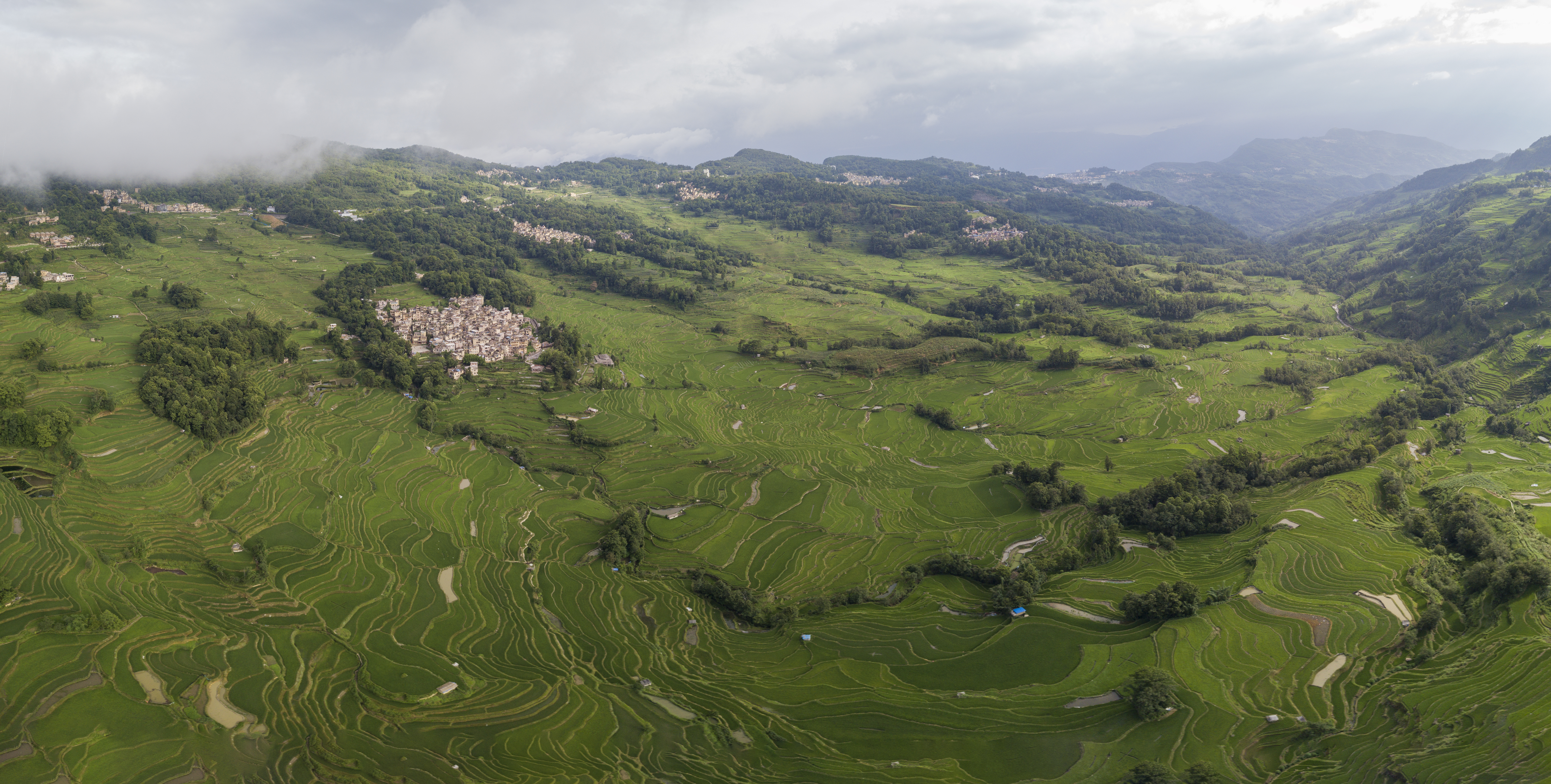
Aerial panorama from Bada

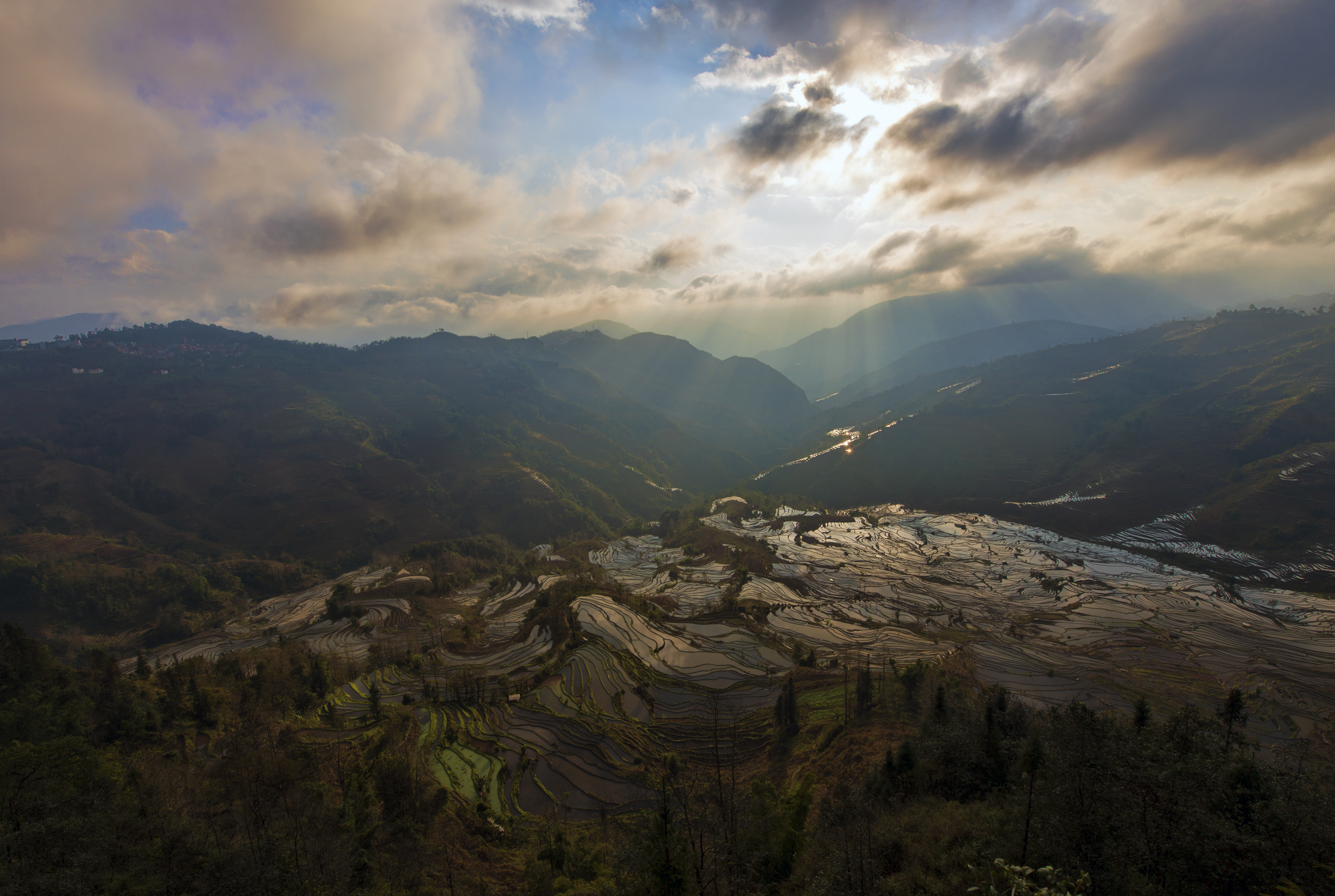
Sunset over Laohuzui

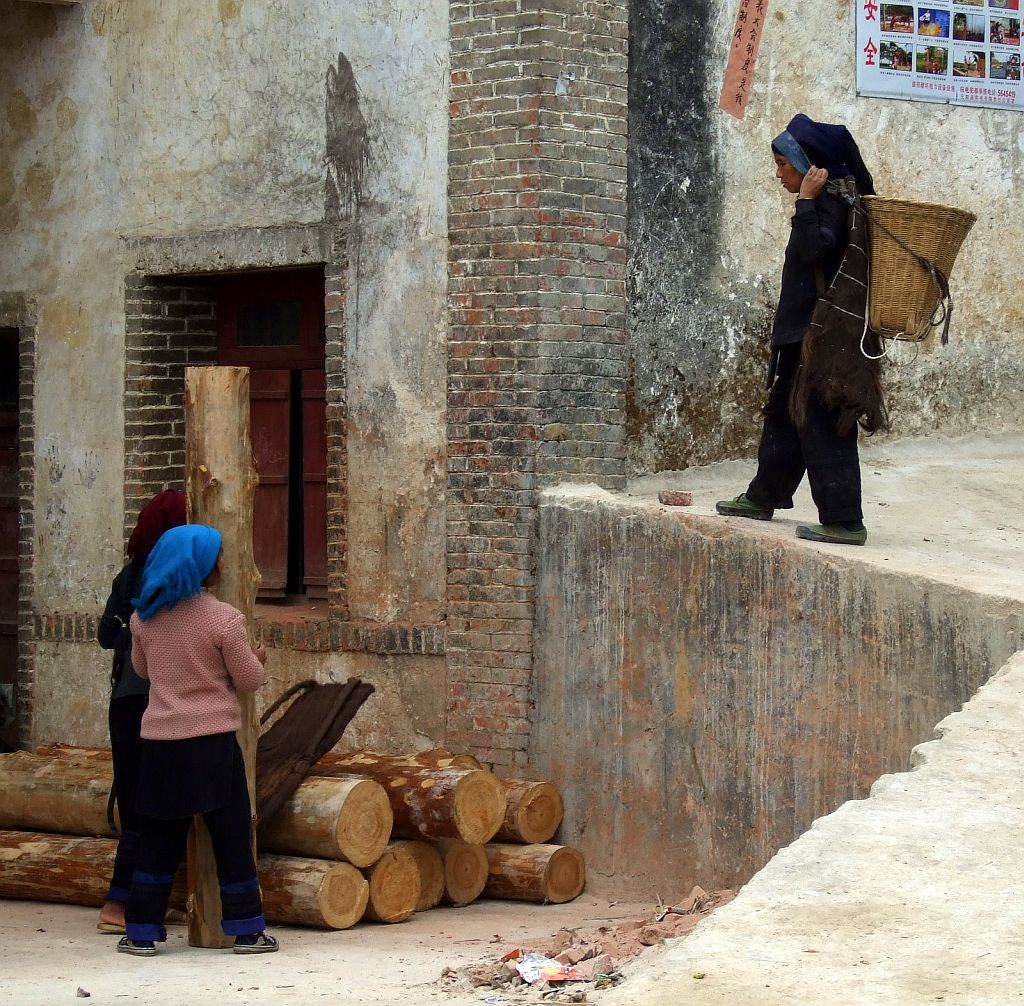
Hani village women of Yuanyang county, Yunnan, China

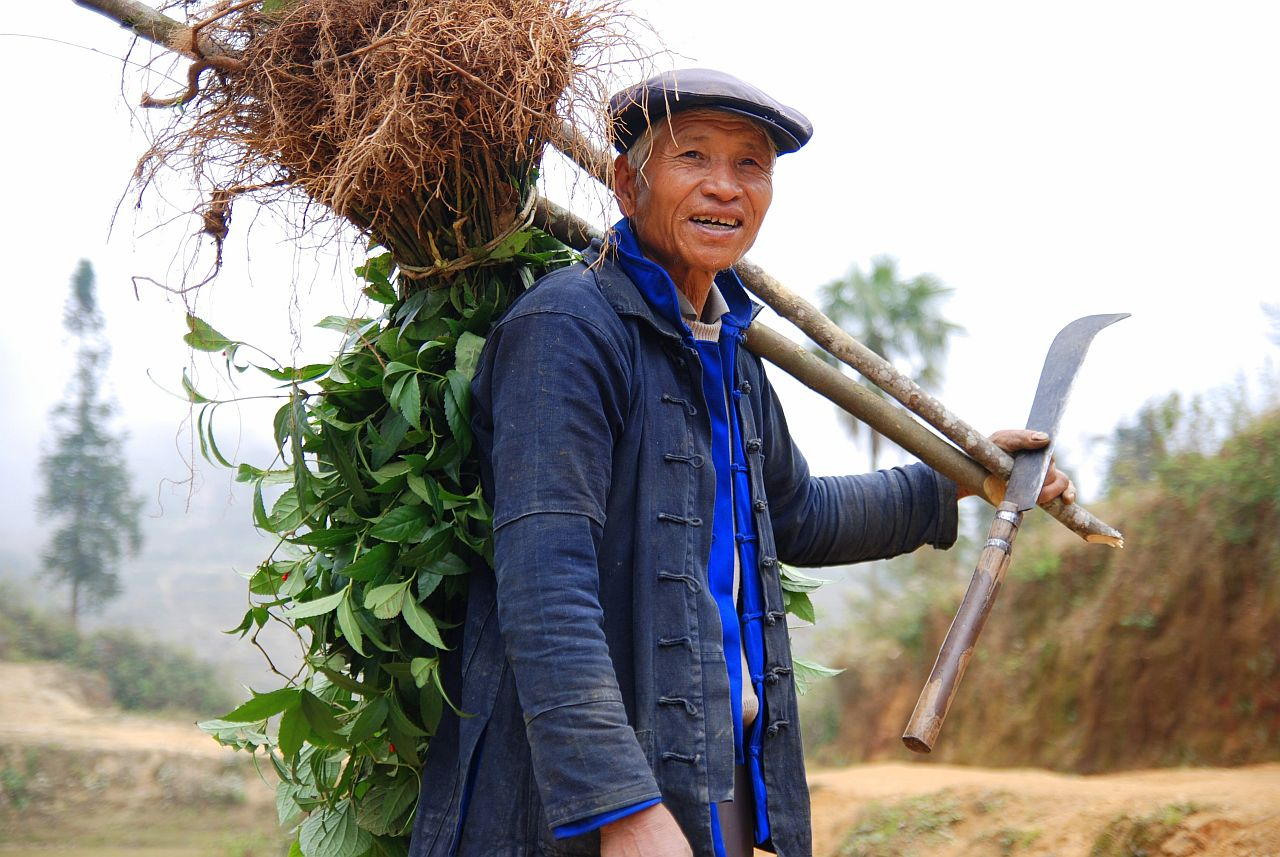
Hani farmer on his way home

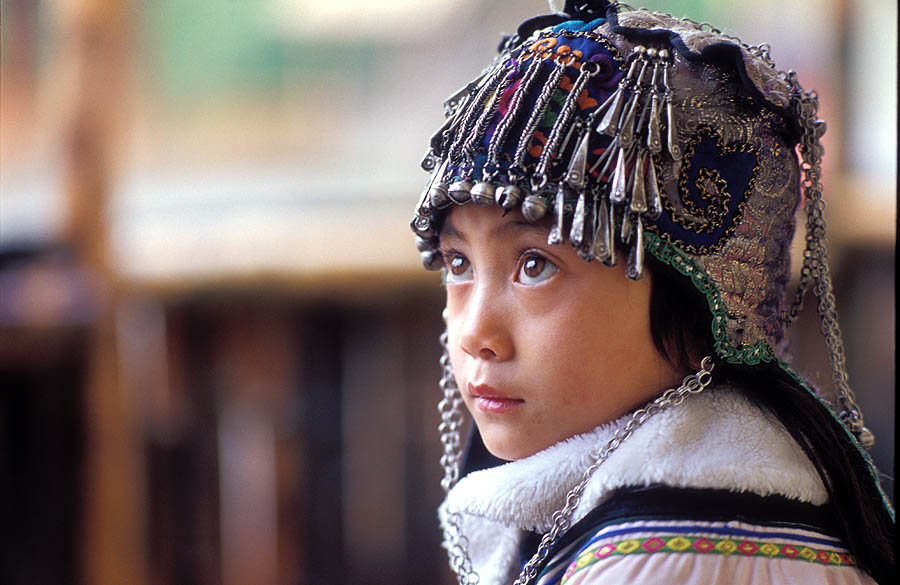
An ethnic Hani girl with the typical headgear for children

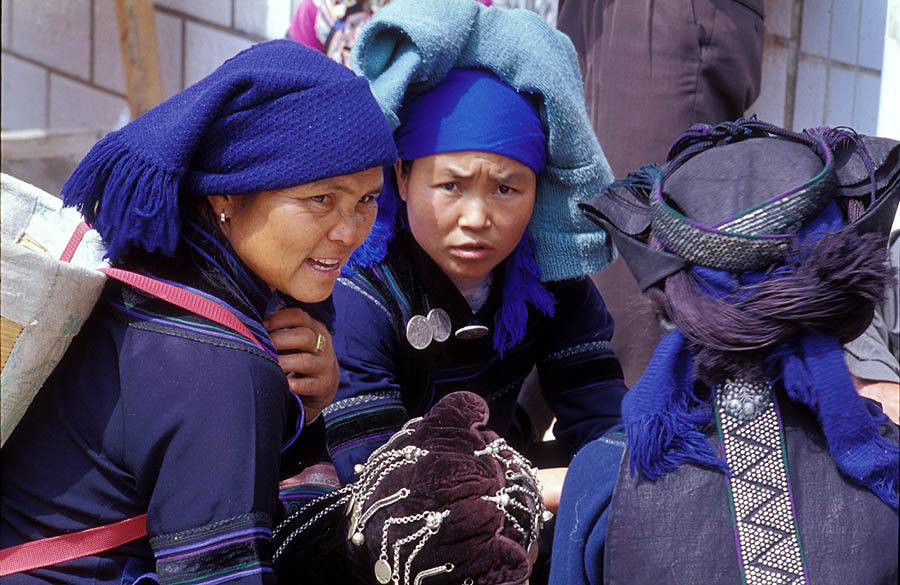
Typical daily attire of ethnic Hani

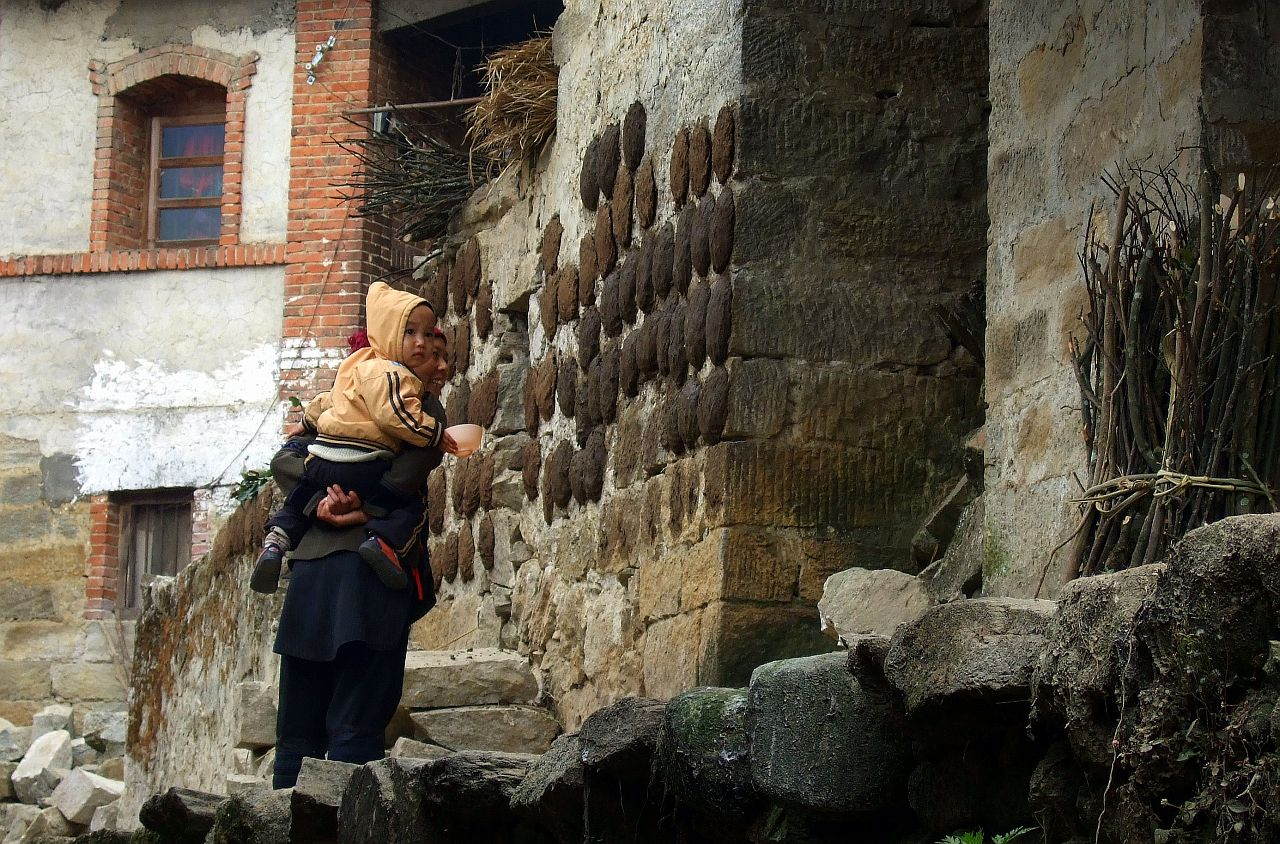
Water buffalo dung drying on a wall in a Hani ethnic minority village in Yuanyang county

== See also ==
- Terrace (agriculture)
- Paddy field
