= Gwantu =

Gwantu Gbantu
- Town
- Location within Nigeria
- Coordinates: 09°13′N 08°27′E
- Country: Nigeria
- State: Kaduna State
- LGA: Sanga
- Time zone: UTC+01:00 (WAT)
- Postal code: 801
- Climate: Aw

Gbantu (Gwantu) is the Sanga Local Government Area headquarters, in southern Kaduna state in the Middle Belt region of Nigeria. It is also the Gwantu Chiefdom headquarters. The town has a post office, with a postal code 801.

== Climate Condition ==
The Gwantu two has to season which are the raining and Cold Seasons. the town lays on latitude 9^{0} 15' North and Longitude 8^{0} 27' 12" East.

== See also ==
- List of villages in Kaduna State
