= Ninzic languages =

Language family

Ninzic
- Plateau IV
- Geographic distribution: Nigeria
- Linguistic classification: Niger–Congo?: Atlantic–Congo; Benue–Congo; Plateau; Ninzic

Language codes
- Glottolog: ninz1247

The dozen or so Ninzic languages are a branch of the Plateau family spoken in central Nigeria.

== Classification ==
There is little data on the Ninzic languages, and it is not clear that all of the following languages are related. Blench (2008) lists the following languages, twice as many as Greenberg 1963 ("Plateau IV"). They are not subclassified apart from a few obvious dialect clusters.

Ce (Che, Rukuba), Ninzo (Ninzam), Mada, Ninkyop (Kaninkwom)–Nindem, Kanufi (Anib), Gwantu (Gbantu), Bu-Ninkada (Bu), Ningye, Nungu, Ninka, Gbətsu, Nkɔ

and perhaps Ayu.

== Names and locations ==
Below is a list of language names, populations, and locations from Blench (2019).

Language	Cluster	Dialects	Alternate spellings	Own name for language	Endonym(s)	Other names (location-based)	Other names for language	Exonym(s)	Speakers	Location(s)
Anib			Kanufi	Anib	Aninib		Karshi		2000 (est. 2006)	Kaduna State, Jema’a LGA. Anib is spoken in two villages about 5 km. west of Gimi, the junction on the Akwanga road which leads towards Kafanchan. Kanufi I is locally called Ákpúrkpòd, and Kanufi II called Ákob.
Bu-Ningkada cluster	Bu-Ningkada	Jida, Abu, Raga (dialect of Abu)	Jidda, Ibut				Nakare			Nasarawa State, Akwanga LGA
Bu	Bu-Ningkada									
Ningkada	Bu-Ningkada									
Che			Ce	Kuche	Bache	Rukuba	Sale, Inchazi		15,600 (1936 HDG); 50,000 (1973 SIL)	Plateau State, Bassa LGA
Mada		Northern and Western clusters. Dialect survey results in Price 1991).			Mәda		Yidda		25,628 (1922 Temple); 15,145 (1934 Ames); 30,000 (1973 SIL)	Nasarawa State, Akwanga, Kokona and Keffi LGAs; Kaduna State, Jema’a LGA
Ninkyop–Nindem cluster	Ninkyop–Nindem									Kaduna State, Jema’a LGA
Ninkyop	Ninkyop–Nindem		Kaningkwom, Kaninkon		Ninkyop, Ninkyob				2,291 (1934)	
Nindem	Ninkyop–Nindem		Inidem, Nindam, Nidem							
Ningye			Ningeshe	Ningye	Ningye				<5000 (Blench 2003)	Kaduna State. 5 villages along the Fadan Karshe-Akwanga road, directly north of Gwantu. Villages are: Kobin, Akwankwan, Wambe, Ningeshen Kurmi, Ningeshen Sarki.
Ninka						Sanga			<5000	Kaduna State, Sanga LGA
Ninzo		Ámàr Ràndá, Ámàr Tìtá, Ancha (Închà), Kwásù (Ákìzà), Sàmbè, Fadan Wate (Hátè)	Ninzam, Ninzom				Gbhu		6,999 (1934 Ames); 35,000 (1973 SIL) 50,000 (Blench 2003)	Kaduna State, Jema’a LGA; Nasarawa State, Akwanga LGA
Numbu–Gbantu-Nunku–Numana cluster	Numbu–Gbantu-Nunku–Numana cluster					Sanga [mistakenly applied to this cluster, but see entry under Ninka]			11,000 (1922 Temple); 3,818 (1934 Ames); 15,000 (SIL)	Kaduna State, Jema’a LGA; Nasarawa State, Akwanga LGA
Numbu	Numbu–Gbantu-Nunku–(Numana)–cluster								The main settlements of the Numbu are àzà Wúùn, Ambεntɔ̀k, Anepwa, Akoshey, Amkpong, Gbancûn, Amfɔɔr and Adaŋgaŋ. There are likely several thousand speakers.	Kaduna State, Jema’a LGA; Nasarawa State, Akwanga LGA
Gbantu	Numbu–Gbantu-Nunku–(Numana)–cluster		Gwanto							Kaduna State, Jema’a LGA; Nasarawa State, Akwanga LGA
Nunku	Numbu–Gbantu-Nunku–(Numana)–cluster	Nunku has three sub-dialects, Nunku [spoken in Nunku and Ungwar Mallam], Nunkucu [in Nunkucu and Anku] and a sub-dialect spoken in Nicok (Ungwar Jatau) and Ungwan Makama villages.								Kaduna State, Jema’a LGA; Nasarawa State, Akwanga LGA
Numana	Numbu–Gbantu-Nunku–(Numana)–cluster		Nimana							Kaduna State, Jema’a LGA; Nasarawa State, Akwanga LGA
Rindre		Rindre, Gudi	Rendre, Rindiri, Lindiri			Wamba, Nungu			10,000 (1972 Welmers); 25,000 (SIL)	Nasarawa State, Akwanga LGA
Ayu			Aya						2,642 (Ames 1934)	Kaduna State, Jema’a LGA
Gbǝtsu	Mada					Katanza			5000 (2008 est.)	Kaduna State, Jema’a LGA. About six villages east of the road north of Akwanga
Nko	Mada					Agyaga			1000 (2008 est.)	Nasarawa State, Akwanga West LGA. Single village about 15 km southwest of Nunku, which is 20 km north of Akwanga
