= Koro Nulu language =

Plateau language of Nigeria

Koro Nulu
- Koro Ija
- Native to: Nigeria
- Region: Abuja Capital Territory, near Lambata
- Native speakers: 4,000 (2020)
- Language family: Niger–Congo?: Atlantic–Congo; (unclassified); Koro Nulu

Language codes
- ISO 639-3: vkn
- Glottolog: koro1323

Koro Nulu, also known as Koro Ija, is a Plateau language of Nigeria, one of several languages which go by the ethnic name Koro. It is not closely related to other languages. It has very low (~ 7%) lexical similarity with Koro Zuba, which speakers consider to be a variant of the same language (along with the Jilic languages) due to ethnic identity. However, the Jilic languages are Plateau and Koro Zuba is apparently Nupoid, and Koro Nulu has yet to be classified.
