= Bu language =

Plateau language spoken in Nigeria

Bu-Ninkada
- Jida-Abu
- Native to: Nigeria
- Region: Nassarawa state
- Native speakers: (6,000 cited 1999)
- Language family: Niger–Congo?: Atlantic–Congo; Benue–Congo; Plateau; Ninzic; Bu-Ninkada
- Dialects: Bu (Abu); Ninkada (Jida)

Language codes
- ISO 639-3: jid
- Glottolog: buuu1244
- ELP: Bu

Bu-Ninkada (Ibut, Abu, Jida) is a Plateau language of Nigeria. The two dialects, Bu and Ninkada, are ethnically distinct.

Bu is spoken by about 4,000 people in the four villages of Nakere, Rago, Maiganga, and Abu. It is closely related to but separate from Ningkada (Jidda).

Ningkada is spoken by about 2,000 people in the two small hamlets of Ningkada (Jidda) and Lago.
