= Ware language =

Extinct Bantu language of East Africa

Ware
- (unattested)
- Region: Lake Victoria
- Ethnicity: Ware
- Extinct: (date missing)
- Language family: Niger–Congo?: Atlantic–Congo; Benue–Congo; Bantoid; Bantu; Northeast Bantu; Great Lakes Bantu; Logooli–Kuria (E.40); Ware

Language codes
- ISO 639-3: wre (deprecated in 2008 as spurious)
- Glottolog: ware1252
- Guthrie code: JE.407

Ware is an extinct, apparently unattested Bantu language near Lake Victoria in East Africa.

== ISO removal ==
When an SIL team failed to find any speakers, Ethnologue retired the ISO code.
