= Ninzo language =

Plateau language spoken in Nigeria

Ninzo
- Ninzam
- Native to: Nigeria
- Region: Kaduna State, Nassarawa State
- Ethnicity: Ninzo people
- Native speakers: (35,000 cited 1973)
- Language family: Niger–Congo?: Atlantic–Congo; Benue–Congo; Plateau; Ninzic; Ninzo

Language codes
- ISO 639-3: nin
- Glottolog: ninz1246
- ELP: Ninzo

Ninzo is a Plateau language spoken by the Ninzo people of central Nigeria.
