= Mada language =

Language of Nigeria

Mada
- Native to: Nigeria
- Region: Nasarawa State, Kaduna State
- Native speakers: (100,000, not counting Nunku cited 1993)
- Language family: Niger–Congo?: Atlantic–Congo; Benue–Congo; Plateau; Ninzic; Mada

Language codes
- ISO 639-3: mda
- Glottolog: mada1282

Mada is a Plateau language of Nigeria and is a regionally important language spoken in Nasarawa and southern Kaduna states of the Middle Belt, Nigeria, with many dialects. It is a highly tonal language. A translation of the New Testament into the language was finished in 1999. The Nunku dialect has been identified to be a dialect of Mada rather than of the Gbantu.

The Mada people are the second most populated tribe in Nasarawa state, mostly populating Akwanga and Kokona local governments. Possible archaeological history suggests that they may be descendants of the Nok civilization. They are closely related to the Ninzo people as well as to the Gbantu people. Their languages are believed to be descended from the Proto-Plateau language.

== Dialects ==
Dialects of Mada, which are mutually intelligible, are Rija, Gbugyar, Anjagwa, Ancho, Buhar, Akwanga, and Ungwar Zaria. Akwanga and Ungwar Zaria are particularly unique.

== Phonology ==
=== Consonants ===
Mada Consonants
		Labial	Alveolar	Laminal	Palatal	Velar		Glottal	
		Labial	Alveolar	Laminal	Palatal	Normal	Labialized	Normal	Labialized
Nasal		m	n			ŋ	(ŋʷ)		
Plosive	voiceless	p	t	t͡s		k	kʷ		
Plosive	voiced	b	d	d͡z		g	gʷ		
Plosive	prenasalised	ᵐb	ⁿd	ⁿd͡z		ᵑɡ	ᵑɡʷ		
Implosive		ɓ	ɗ						
Fricative	voiceless	f	ɬ	s				h	hʷ
Fricative	voiced	v	ɮ	z					
Trill			r						
Approximant			l		j		w		

All consonants can be geminated, and geminated consonants hold equal status as non-geminated ones.

Geminated consonants originated from word initial CV to VC, vowel loss, and reduplication

/ŋ/ was historically a word final allophone of /n/, however, due to borrowing, it morphed.

==== Allophones ====
1. Laminal consonants become post-alveolar consonants in palatalized words.
2. Implosives are unreleased word finally.
3. /t͡s/ and /d͡z/ are grooved.
4. /h(ʷ)/ is in free variation with [x(ʷ)], though /h(ʷ)/ is more common.

==== Occurrence ====
Voiceless plosives are more common word initially then finally. Overall /p/ is 3 times less common than /t/ and 7 times less common than /k/. Prenasalized consonants are more common word medially than initially; initially /ᵐb/ and /ᵑɡ/ are twice as common as /ⁿd/. Voiceless fricatives are 3 times more common as voiced ones word finally. /t͡s/ is very rare word finally. /n/ is overall the most common consonant, however world initially /m/ is 5 times as common. /l/ and /r/ are rare world initially.

=== Vowels ===
Mada has only one full vowel, /a/ or /V/.

Epenthetic vowels are inserted to break up consonant clusters. They are [ə], [ɪ], [ʊ], and [ʏ], depending on prosody, and are three times shorter than a normal vowel.

/V/ and /Ø/ have the following properties:

1. [a] or [ə] when no prosody applies
2. [o] or [u] when labialisation prosody applies (/V/ here is realized as [ɔ] in closed syllables)
3. [e] or [i] when palatalization prosody applies (/V/ here is realized as [ɛ] in closed syllables)
4. [ø~œ] or [y] when both labialization and prosody applies

Vowels can be rounded preceding labiovelars or either of /m/ or /w/, turning /i/, /ɪ/, /e/, and /ɛ/, into /y/, ʏ/, ø/, and /œ/, respectively.

Vowel raising also occurs in Mada, where central vowels are raised to /ə/, back vowels to /u/, front unrounded vowels to /i/, and front rounded vowels to /y/. It occurs in the following circumstances:

1. Before consonant clusters and liquids
2. Between two identical consonants
3. In certain consonant clusters
4. In the sequences CVwC and CVjC
5. In the word final CVj sequence
6. In the penultimate syllable of a word (sometimes, post lexical)

Long vowels do occur but are rare and come from vowel contraction, partial reduplication, or contact with semi vowels. Vowels are slightly lengthened word finally, not enough to be considered long though.

=== Tones ===
Mada has two tones, low and high, however, when the vowels carrying the tone are adjacent to voiced obstruents, the tone lowers. Tones also serve grammatical function as most verbs are toneless and get their tones from supersegmental melodies.

=== Prosody ===
Mada also has labialization and palatalization prosodies which can also combine. Palatalization and labialization spread leftwards across morpheme boundaries. When they spread onto each other it creates labiopalatalization. Palatalization indicates direction towards the speaker, while labialization indicates direction away from the speaker. Palatalization can also turn adjectives into diminutives.

==== Frequency ====
Prosodies have the following frequences on nouns:

1. No prosody: 58%
2. Palatalization: 26%
3. Labialization: 14%
4. Labiopalatalization: 2%

And the following frequences on verbs:

1. No prosody: 58%
2. Palatalization: 19%
3. Labialization: 15%
4. Exceptions: 5%
5. Labiopalatalization: 3%

Palatalization also orthographically spreads leftwards the following percentages:

1. No spreading: 65%
2. Spreading to the verb root: 28%
3. Spreading to the subject prefix: 7%

== Phonotactics and syllables ==
Syllabification is a surface structure phenomenon and therefore unstable. Syllable boundaries can change according to the speech and metrical structure of phrases. Syllables can also be word initially palatalized and word finally labialized. Mada words are built from consonant skeletons, which are made into full words by adding vowels, prosodies, and tones to them. Mada words must contain at least one vowel, and the same applies to noun roots, but not to verb roots. Overall, Mada has the following phonotactical rules:

1. No consonant clusters are allowed in the coda.
2. the final syllable of a word must have a full vowel.
3. Final syllables should (usually) be stressed.
4. /z(ⁿ)d/, /bm/, /dn/, /d͡zn/, and /g(ʷ)ŋ/ are not allowed.
5. /wk/, /wg/, and /wᵑɡ/ can only exist at morpheme or syllable boundaries.
6. Voiced, prenasalized, and geminated consonants cannot exist word finally.
7. Sounds closer to the syllable nucleus become more sonorius.
8. /b/, /d/, and /g/ can only be followed by a liquid or semi vowel.
9. /ⁿd/ cannot be followed by any consonant.
10. /ᵐb/ and /ᵑɡ/ can only be followed by liquids or lateral fricatives.
11. /d͡z/ never occurs word finally and can only be followed by /h/ or /r/.
12. /t͡s/ can only be followed by /k/ or /h/.
13. /ŋ/ does not occur word initially.

=== Noun roots ===
Mada contains the following noun roots

Number of consonants	Structure
1	CV
1	VCV
2	CCV
2	CVC
2	CVCV
2	VCVC
2	VCCV
2	VCVCV
3	CCVC
3	CVCVCV
3	CVCCV
3	CVCVC
3	VCVCVC
3	VCCVC
3	VCVCVCV
3	VCCVC

=== Verb roots ===
Mada contains the following verb roots

Number of consonants	Structure
1	CV
2	CC
2	CVC
2	CVCV
2	CCV
3	CCVC
3	CVCVC
3	CVCVCV
3	CCVCV

=== Syllables ===
Roots with vowels attached can be split into the following syllables

Structure	Distribution
V	Word initially only
VC	Word initially only
CV	Everywhere
CVC	Everywhere
CCV	Everywhere
CCVC	Words with only one syllable
