= Kuan language =

Austroasiatic language of Yunnan, China

Kuanhua
- Damai
- Native to: China
- Region: Southwest Yunnan
- Native speakers: (1,000 cited 1991)
- Language family: Austroasiatic: Khasi–Palaungic; Palaungic; Kuanhua

Language codes
- ISO 639-3: xnh
- Glottolog: kuan1250
- ELP: Kuanhua

Kuan (Kuanhua 寬話 宽语), is a poorly classified Austroasiatic language spoken by about 1,000 people in Jinghong County, Xishuangbanna, Yunnan, China. Li (2005) proposes that it is a Mangic language. Other possible affiliations include Palaungic, Khmuic, or even an independent branch of the Austro-Asiatic language family.
