= Jili language =

Plateau language spoken in Nigeria

Jili
- Lijili
- Native to: Nigeria
- Region: Nassarawa State
- Native speakers: 40,000 (2006)
- Language family: Niger–Congo?: Atlantic–Congo; Benue–Congo; Plateau; South; Jilic; Jili

Language codes
- ISO 639-3: mgi
- Glottolog: liji1238

Jili
- Person: Jijili
- People: Mijili
- Language: Lijili

Jili (Lijili) is a Plateau language of Nigeria. It is one of several languages which go by the ambiguous name Koro.

Due to 19th-century slave raids, Jili speakers are scattered across different areas of central Nigeria.
