= Numana language =

Plateau language of Nigeria

Numana
- Native to: Nigeria
- Native speakers: 50,000, including Nunku (2008)
- Language family: Niger–Congo?: Atlantic–Congo; Benue–Congo; Plateau; Ninzic; Numana
- Dialects: Gbantu (Gwantu); Ningye; Numbu; Janda

Language codes
- ISO 639-3: nbr
- Glottolog: numa1252
- ELP: Ningye

Numana is a dialect cluster of Plateau languages in Nigeria.

== Varieties ==
There are four principal dialects:

- Gbantu
- Numbu
- Ningye
- Janda

Nunku had previously been counted as Numana, due to geographic proximity, but is actually a dialect of Mada.
