= Ake language =

Plateau language spoken in Nigeria

Ake
- Aike
- Native to: Nigeria
- Region: Nassarawa State
- Native speakers: (3,000 cited 1999)
- Language family: Niger–Congo?: Atlantic–Congo; Benue–Congo; Plateau; South; Eggonic; Ake

Language codes
- ISO 639-3: aik
- Glottolog: akee1238
- ELP: Ake

Ake (Aike) is a Plateau language of Nigeria. It is spoken in three villages near Akwanga.
