= Nungu language =

Plateau language spoken in Nigeria

Nungu
- Rindiri
- Native to: Nigeria
- Region: Nasarawa State
- Native speakers: (30,000 cited 1999)
- Language family: Niger–Congo?: Atlantic–Congo; Benue–Congo; Plateau; Ninzic; Nungu
- Dialects: Rinde; Gudi

Language codes
- ISO 639-3: rin
- Glottolog: nung1292

Nungu is a Plateau language of Nigeria. It divides into two dialects, Gudi and Rinde (Rindre, Rindiri).
