= Jijili language =

Plateau language spoken in Nigeria

Jijili
- Tanjijili
- Native to: Nigeria
- Region: Niger State
- Native speakers: (8,500 cited 2000)
- Language family: Niger–Congo?: Atlantic–Congo; Benue–Congo; Plateau; South; Jilic; Jijili

Language codes
- ISO 639-3: uji
- Glottolog: tanj1247

Jijili
- Person: Ujijili
- People: Ajijili
- Language: Tanjijili

The Jijili language, Tanjijili, also known as Ujijili or Rjili, is a Plateau language of Nigeria. It is one of several languages which go by the ethnic name Koro.
