= ISO 639:m =

List of ISO 639-3 language codes starting with M

This is a list of ISO 639-3 language codes starting with M.

Index | a | b | c | d | e | f | g | h | i | j | k | l | m | n | o | p | q | r | s | t | u | v | w | x | y | z

Abbreviations are used in the table as follows:

- Scope: I = individual language, M = macrolanguage, S = special code
- Type: C = constructed, E = extinct (in recent times), H = historical (distinct from its modern form), L = living, S = special code

Deprecated codes are enclosed in (parentheses).

The column Family contains the generic English name of the language's family or macrolanguage.

ISO 639 codes			Scope/Type	Family	Language names	
639-3	639-1	639-2/B	Scope/Type	Family	Native	ISO name
maa			I/L			San Jerónimo Tecóatl Mazatec
mab			I/L			Yutanduchi Mixtec
mad		mad	I/L		Basa Mathura	Madurese
mae			I/L			Bo-Rukul
maf			I/L			Mafa
mag		mag	I/L		मगही	Magahi
mah	mh	mah	I/L	Austronesian	Kajin M̧ajeļ	Marshallese
mai		mai	I/L		मैथिली	Maithili
maj			I/L			Jalapa De Díaz Mazatec
mak		mak	I/L			Makasar
mal	ml	mal	I/L	Dravidian	മലയാളം	Malayalam
mam			I/L			Mam
man		man	M/L			Manding; Mandingo
maq			I/L			Chiquihuitlán Mazatec
mar	mr	mar	I/L	Indo-European	मराठी	Marathi
mas		mas	I/L		ɔl Maa	Masai
mat			I/L			San Francisco Matlatzinca
mau			I/L			Huautla Mazatec
mav			I/L			Sateré-Mawé
maw			I/L			Mampruli
max			I/L			North Moluccan Malay
maz			I/L			Central Mazahua
mba			I/L			Higaonon
mbb			I/L			Western Bukidnon Manobo
mbc			I/L			Macushi
mbd			I/L			Dibabawon Manobo
mbe			I/E			Molale
mbf			I/L			Baba Malay
(mbg)			I/L			Northern Nambikuára
mbh			I/L			Mangseng
mbi			I/L			Ilianen Manobo
mbj			I/L			Nadëb
mbk			I/L			Malol
mbl			I/L			Maxakalí
mbm			I/L			Ombamba
mbn			I/L			Macaguán
mbo			I/L			Mbo (Cameroon)
mbp			I/L			Malayo
mbq			I/L			Maisin
mbr			I/L			Nukak Makú
mbs			I/L			Sarangani Manobo
mbt			I/L			Matigsalug Manobo
mbu			I/L			Mbula-Bwazza
mbv			I/L			Mbulungish
mbw			I/L			Maring
mbx			I/L			Mari (East Sepik Province)
mby			I/L			Memoni
mbz			I/L			Amoltepec Mixtec
mca			I/L			Maca
mcb			I/L			Machiguenga
mcc			I/L			Bitur
mcd			I/L			Sharanahua
mce			I/L			Itundujia Mixtec
mcf			I/L			Matsés
mcg			I/L			Mapoyo
mch			I/L			Maquiritari
mci			I/L			Mese
mcj			I/L			Mvanip
mck			I/L			Mbunda
mcl			I/E			Macaguaje
mcm			I/L			Malaccan Creole Portuguese
mcn			I/L			Masana
mco			I/L			Coatlán Mixe
mcp			I/L			Makaa
mcq			I/L			Ese
mcr			I/L			Menya
mcs			I/L			Mambai
mct			I/L			Mengisa
mcu			I/L			Cameroon Mambila
mcv			I/L			Minanibai
mcw			I/L			Mawa (Chad)
mcx			I/L			Mpiemo
mcy			I/L			South Watut
mcz			I/L			Mawan
mda			I/L			Mada (Nigeria)
mdb			I/L			Morigi
mdc			I/L	Trans–New Guinea?	Male	Soq
mdd			I/L			Mbum
mde			I/L			Maba (Chad)
mdf		mdf	I/L		мокша	Moksha
mdg			I/L			Massalat
mdh			I/L			Maguindanaon
mdi			I/L			Mamvu
mdj			I/L			Mangbetu
mdk			I/L			Mangbutu
mdl			I/L			Maltese Sign Language
mdm			I/L			Mayogo
mdn			I/L			Mbati
(mdo)			I/L			Southwest Gbaya
mdp			I/L			Mbala
mdq			I/L			Mbole
mdr		mdr	I/L			Mandar
mds			I/L			Maria (Papua New Guinea)
mdt			I/L			Mbere
mdu			I/L			Mboko
mdv			I/L			Santa Lucía Monteverde Mixtec
mdw			I/L			Mbosi
mdx			I/L			Dizin
mdy			I/L	Afro-Asiatic	Maale	Male
mdz			I/L	Tupian		Suruí Do Pará
mea			I/L			Menka
meb			I/L			Ikobi
mec			I/L			Marra
med			I/L			Melpa
mee			I/L			Mengen
mef			I/L			Megam
(meg)			I/L			Mea
meh			I/L			Southwestern Tlaxiaco Mixtec
mei			I/L			Midob
mej			I/L			Meyah
mek			I/L			Mekeo
mel			I/L			Central Melanau
mem			I/E			Mangala
men		men	I/L		Mɛnde	Mende (Sierra Leone)
meo			I/L			Kedah Malay
mep			I/L			Miriwoong
meq			I/L			Merey
mer			I/L			Meru
mes			I/L			Masmaje
met			I/L			Mato
meu			I/L			Motu
mev			I/L			Mano
mew			I/L			Maaka
mey			I/L	Afro-Asiatic	حسانية	Hassaniyya
mez			I/L		Omāēqnomenew	Menominee
mfa			I/L		Kecek Taning/Klate	Pattani Malay
mfb			I/L			Bangka
mfc			I/L			Mba
mfd			I/L			Mendankwe-Nkwen
mfe			I/L		morisyin	Morisyen
mff			I/L			Naki
mfg			I/L			Mogofin
mfh			I/L			Matal
mfi			I/L			Wandala
mfj			I/L			Mefele
mfk			I/L			North Mofu
mfl			I/L			Putai
mfm			I/L			Marghi South
mfn			I/L			Cross River Mbembe
mfo			I/L			Mbe
mfp			I/L			Makassar Malay
mfq			I/L			Moba
mfr			I/L			Marrithiyel
mfs			I/L			Mexican Sign Language
mft			I/L			Mokerang
mfu			I/L			Mbwela
mfv			I/L			Mandjak
mfw			I/E			Mulaha
mfx			I/L			Melo
mfy			I/L		Caíta	Mayo
mfz			I/L			Mabaan
mga		mga	I/H			Middle Irish (900-1200)
mgb			I/L			Mararit
mgc			I/L			Morokodo
mgd			I/L			Moru
mge			I/L			Mango
mgf			I/L			Maklew
mgg			I/L			Mpumpong
mgh			I/L			Makhuwa-Meetto
mgi			I/L			Lijili
mgj			I/L			Abureni
mgk			I/L			Mawes
mgl			I/L			Maleu-Kilenge
mgm			I/L			Mambae
mgn			I/L			Mbangi
mgo			I/L			Meta'
mgp			I/L	Sino-Tibetan		Magar
mgq			I/L			Malila
mgr			I/L			Mambwe-Lungu
mgs			I/L			Manda (Tanzania)
mgt			I/L			Mongol
mgu			I/L			Mailu
mgv			I/L			Matengo
mgw			I/L			Matumbi
(mgx)			I/L			Omati
mgy			I/L			Mbunga
mgz			I/L			Mbugwe
mha			I/L			Manda (India)
mhb			I/L			Mahongwe
mhc			I/L			Mocho
mhd			I/L			Mbugu
mhe			I/L			Besisi; Mah Meri
mhf			I/L			Mamaa
mhg			I/L			Margu
(mhh)			I/L	spurious language		Maskoy Pidgin
mhi			I/L			Ma'di
mhj			I/L			Mogholi
mhk			I/L			Mungaka
mhl			I/L			Mauwake
mhm			I/L			Makhuwa-Moniga
mhn			I/L	Indo-European	Bersntolerisch	Mòcheno
mho			I/L			Mashi (Zambia)
mhp			I/L			Balinese Malay
mhq			I/L		Rų́ʼeta:re	Mandan
mhr			I/L			Eastern Mari
mhs			I/L			Buru (Indonesia)
mht			I/L			Mandahuaca
mhu			I/L	Digarish	tɑ31 rɑŋ53	Darang Deng; Digaro-Mishmi
(mhv)			I/L			Arakanese
mhw			I/L			Mbukushu
mhx			I/L			Lhaovo; Maru
mhy			I/L			Ma'anyan
mhz			I/L			Mor (Mor Islands)
mia			I/L			Miami
mib			I/L			Atatláhuca Mixtec
mic		mic	I/L		Mi'gmaq	Micmac; Mi'kmaq
mid			I/L		Mandāyì	Mandaic
mie			I/L			Ocotepec Mixtec
mif			I/L			Mofu-Gudur
mig			I/L			San Miguel El Grande Mixtec
mih			I/L			Chayuco Mixtec
mii			I/L			Chigmecatitlán Mixtec
mij			I/L			Abar; Mungbam
mik			I/L			Mikasuki
mil			I/L			Peñoles Mixtec
mim			I/L			Alacatlatzala Mixtec
min		min	I/L		Baso Minangkabau	Minangkabau
mio			I/L			Pinotepa Nacional Mixtec
mip			I/L			Apasco-Apoala Mixtec
miq			I/L			Mískito
mir			I/L			Isthmus Mixe
mis		mis	S/S			Uncoded languages
mit			I/L			Southern Puebla Mixtec
miu			I/L			Cacaloxtepec Mixtec
(miv)			I/L			Mimi
miw			I/L			Akoye
mix			I/L			Mixtepec Mixtec
miy			I/L			Ayutla Mixtec
miz			I/L			Coatzospan Mixtec
(mja)			I/L	spurious language		Mahei
mjb			I/L	Trans–New Guinea		Makalero
mjc			I/L			San Juan Colorado Mixtec
mjd			I/L			Northwest Maidu
mje			I/E			Muskum
mjg			I/L			Tu
mjh			I/L			Mwera (Nyasa)
mji			I/L	Hmong–Mien		Kim Mun
mjj			I/L			Mawak
mjk			I/L			Matukar
mjl			I/L			Mandeali
mjm			I/L			Medebur
mjn			I/L			Ma (Papua New Guinea)
mjo			I/L			Malankuravan
mjp			I/L			Malapandaram
mjq			I/E			Malaryan
mjr			I/L			Malavedan
mjs			I/L			Miship
mjt			I/L			Sauria Paharia
mju			I/L			Manna-Dora
mjv			I/L			Mannan
mjw			I/L	Sino-Tibetan	Arlêng	Karbi
mjx			I/L			Mahali
mjy			I/E			Mahican
mjz			I/L			Majhi
mka			I/L			Mbre
mkb			I/L			Mal Paharia
mkc			I/L			Siliput
mkd	mk	mac	I/L	Indo-European	македонски	Macedonian
mke			I/L			Mawchi
mkf			I/L			Miya
mkg			I/L			Mak (China)
mki			I/L			Dhatki
mkj			I/L			Mokilese
mkk			I/L			Byep
mkl			I/L			Mokole
mkm			I/L			Moklen
mkn			I/L			Kupang Malay
mko			I/L			Mingang Doso
mkp			I/L			Moikodi
mkq			I/E			Bay Miwok
mkr			I/L			Malas
mks			I/L			Silacayoapan Mixtec
mkt			I/L			Vamale
mku			I/L	Niger–Congo?	ߡߊ߬ߣߌ߲߬ߞߊ߬ߞߊ߲	Konyanka Maninka
mkv			I/L			Mafea
mkw			I/L			Kituba (Congo)
mkx			I/L			Kinamiging Manobo
mky			I/L			East Makian
mkz			I/L			Makasae
mla			I/L			Malo
mlb			I/L			Mbule
mlc			I/L			Cao Lan
(mld)			I/L	spurious language		Malakhel
mle			I/L			Manambu
mlf			I/L			Mal
mlg	mg	mlg	M/L	Austronesian	Malagasy	Malagasy
mlh			I/L			Mape
mli			I/L			Malimpung
mlj			I/L			Miltu
mlk			I/L	Niger–Congo?	Kiwilwana	Ilwana; Kiwilwana
mll			I/L			Malua Bay
mlm			I/L			Mulam
mln			I/L			Malango
mlo			I/L			Mlomp
mlp			I/L			Bargam
mlq			I/L			Western Maninkakan
mlr			I/L			Vame
mls			I/L			Masalit
mlt	mt	mlt	I/L	Afro-Asiatic	bil-Malta	Maltese
mlu			I/L			To'abaita
mlv			I/L			Motlav; Mwotlap
mlw			I/L			Moloko
mlx			I/L			Malfaxal; Naha'ai
(mly)			I/L			Malay (individual language)
mlz			I/L			Malaynon
mma			I/L			Mama
mmb			I/L			Momina
mmc			I/L			Michoacán Mazahua
mmd			I/L			Maonan
mme			I/L			Mae
mmf			I/L			Mundat
mmg			I/L			North Ambrym
mmh			I/L			Mehináku
mmi			I/L	Trans–New Guinea?	Aregerek	Hember Avu; Amben; Musar
mmj			I/L			Majhwar
mmk			I/L			Mukha-Dora
mml			I/L			Man Met
mmm			I/L			Maii
mmn			I/L			Mamanwa
mmo			I/L			Mangga Buang
mmp			I/L			Siawi
mmq			I/L			Musak
mmr			I/L	Hmong–Mien	Dut Xonb	Western Xiangxi Miao
(mms)			I/L			Southern Mam
mmt			I/L			Malalamai
mmu			I/L			Mmaala
mmv			I/E			Miriti
mmw			I/L			Emae
mmx			I/L			Madak
mmy			I/L			Migaama
mmz			I/L			Mabaale
mna			I/L			Mbula
mnb			I/L			Muna
mnc		mnc	I/L		ᠮᠠᠨᠵᡠ ᡤᡳᠰᡠᠨ	Manchu
mnd			I/L			Mondé
mne			I/L			Naba
mnf			I/L			Mundani
mng			I/L			Eastern Mnong
mnh			I/L			Mono (Democratic Republic of Congo)
mni		mni	I/L	Sino-Tibetan	ꯃꯩꯇꯩꯂꯣꯟ; মৈতৈলোন	Manipuri
mnj			I/L			Munji
mnk			I/L			Mandinka
mnl			I/L			Tiale
mnm			I/L			Mapena
mnn			I/L			Southern Mnong
mnp			I/L	Sino-Tibetan	闽北语	Min Bei Chinese
mnq			I/L			Minriq
mnr			I/L			Mono (USA)
mns			I/L	Uralic	ма̄ньси	Mansi
(mnt)			I/E			Maykulan
mnu			I/L			Mer
mnv			I/L			Rennell-Bellona
mnw			I/L		ဘာသာမန်	Mon
mnx			I/L			Manikion
mny			I/L			Manyawa
mnz			I/L			Moni
moa			I/L			Mwan
(mob)			I/L			Moinba
moc			I/L			Mocoví
mod			I/E			Mobilian
moe			I/L			Innu; Montagnais
(mof)			I/E			Mohegan-Montauk-Narragansett
mog			I/L			Mongondow
moh		moh	I/L		Kanien’kéha	Mohawk
moi			I/L			Mboi
moj			I/L			Monzombo
mok			I/L			Morori
(mol)	(mo)	(mol)	I/L			Moldavian
mom			I/E			Mangue
mon	mn	mon	M/L	Mongolic	монгол	Mongolian
moo			I/L			Monom
mop			I/L			Mopán Maya
moq			I/L			Mor (Bomberai Peninsula)
mor			I/L			Moro
mos		mos	I/L		Mòoré	Mossi
mot			I/L			Barí
mou			I/L			Mogum
mov			I/L			Mohave
mow			I/L			Moi (Congo)
mox			I/L			Molima
moy			I/L			Shekkacho
moz			I/L			Gergiko; Mukulu
mpa			I/L			Mpoto
mpb			I/L			Malak Malak; Mullukmulluk
mpc			I/L			Mangarrayi
mpd			I/L			Machinere
mpe			I/L			Majang
(mpf)			I/L			Tajumulco Mam
mpg			I/L			Marba
mph			I/L			Maung
mpi			I/L			Mpade
mpj			I/L			Martu Wangka; Wangkajunga
mpk			I/L			Mbara (Chad)
mpl			I/L			Middle Watut
mpm			I/L			Yosondúa Mixtec
mpn			I/L			Mindiri
mpo			I/L			Miu
mpp			I/L			Migabac
mpq			I/L			Matís
mpr			I/L			Vangunu
mps			I/L			Dadibi
mpt			I/L			Mian
mpu			I/L			Makuráp
mpv			I/L	Trans–New Guinea		Mungkip
mpw			I/L			Mapidian
mpx			I/L			Misima-Panaeati
mpy			I/L			Mapia
mpz			I/L			Mpi
mqa			I/L			Maba (Indonesia)
mqb			I/L			Mbuko
mqc			I/L			Mangole
(mqd)			I/L			Madang
mqe			I/L			Matepi
mqf			I/L			Momuna
mqg			I/L			Kota Bangun Kutai Malay
mqh			I/L			Tlazoyaltepec Mixtec
mqi			I/L			Mariri
mqj			I/L			Mamasa
mqk			I/L			Rajah Kabunsuwan Manobo
mql			I/L			Mbelime
mqm			I/L			South Marquesan
mqn			I/L			Moronene
mqo			I/L			Modole
mqp			I/L			Manipa
mqq			I/L			Minokok
mqr			I/L			Mander
mqs			I/L			West Makian
mqt			I/L			Mok
mqu			I/L			Mandari
mqv			I/L			Mosimo
mqw			I/L			Murupi
mqx			I/L			Mamuju
mqy			I/L			Manggarai
mqz			I/L			Pano
mra			I/L			Mlabri
mrb			I/L			Marino
mrc			I/L			Maricopa
(mrd)			I/L	Sino-Tibetan		Western Magar
mre			I/E			Martha's Vineyard Sign Language
mrf			I/L			Elseng
mrg			I/L			Mising
mrh			I/L			Mara Chin
mri	mi	mao	I/L	Austronesian	te reo Māori	Maori
mrj			I/L			Western Mari
mrk			I/L			Hmwaveke
mrl			I/L			Mortlockese
mrm			I/L			Merlav; Mwerlap
mrn			I/L			Cheke Holo
mro			I/L	Sino-Tibetan	𖩃𖩓𖩑	Mru
mrp			I/L			Morouas
mrq			I/L			North Marquesan
mrr			I/L			Maria (India)
mrs			I/L			Maragus
mrt			I/L			Marghi Central
mru			I/L			Mono (Cameroon)
mrv			I/L			Mangareva
mrw			I/L		Austronesian	Maranao
mrx			I/L			Dineor; Maremgi
mry			I/L			Mandaya
mrz			I/L			Marind
msa	ms	may	M/L	Austronesian	bahasa Melayu	Malay (macrolanguage)
msb			I/L			Masbatenyo
msc			I/L	Niger–Congo?	ߡߊ߬ߣߌ߲߬ߞߊ߬ߞߊ߲	Sankaran Maninka
msd			I/L			Yucatec Maya Sign Language
mse			I/L			Musey
msf			I/L			Mekwei
msg			I/L			Moraid
msh			I/L			Masikoro Malagasy
msi			I/L			Sabah Malay
msj			I/L			Ma (Democratic Republic of Congo)
msk			I/L			Mansaka
msl			I/L			Molof; Poule
msm			I/L			Agusan Manobo
msn			I/L			Vurës
mso			I/L			Mombum
msp			I/E			Maritsauá
msq			I/L			Caac
msr			I/L			Mongolian Sign Language
mss			I/L			West Masela
(mst)			I/L			Cataelano Mandaya
msu			I/L			Musom
msv			I/L			Maslam
msw			I/L			Mansoanka
msx			I/L			Moresada
msy			I/L			Aruamu
msz			I/L			Momare
mta			I/L			Cotabato Manobo
mtb			I/L			Anyin Morofo
mtc			I/L			Munit
mtd			I/L			Mualang
mte			I/L			Mono (Solomon Islands)
mtf			I/L			Murik (Papua New Guinea)
mtg			I/L			Una
mth			I/L			Munggui
mti			I/L			Maiwa (Papua New Guinea)
mtj			I/L			Moskona
mtk			I/L			Mbe'
mtl			I/L			Montol
mtm			I/E	Uralic	Motor	Mator
mtn			I/E			Matagalpa
mto			I/L			Totontepec Mixe
mtp			I/L			Wichí Lhamtés Nocten
mtq			I/L		Mường	Muong
mtr			I/L			Mewari
mts			I/L			Yora
mtt			I/L			Mota
mtu			I/L			Tututepec Mixtec
mtv			I/L			Asaro'o
mtw			I/L			Southern Binukidnon
mtx			I/L			Tidaá Mixtec
mty			I/L			Nabi
(mtz)			I/L			Tacanec
mua			I/L			Mundang
mub			I/L			Mubi
muc			I/L			Ajumbu
mud			I/L			Mednyj Aleut
mue			I/L			Media Lengua
mug			I/L			Musgu
muh			I/L			Mündü
mui			I/L			Musi
muj			I/L			Mabire
muk			I/L			Mugom
mul		mul	S/S		*	Multiple languages
mum			I/L			Maiwala
muo			I/L			Nyong
mup			I/L			Malvi
muq			I/L	Hmong–Mien	Dut Xonb	Eastern Xiangxi Miao
mur			I/L			Murle
mus		mus	I/L		Mvskokē	Creek
mut			I/L			Western Muria
muu			I/L			Yaaku
muv			I/L			Muthuvan
(muw)			I/L			Mundari
mux			I/L	Trans–New Guinea	Tembagla	Bo-Ung
muy			I/L			Muyang
muz			I/L			Mursi
mva			I/L			Manam
mvb			I/E			Mattole
(mvc)			I/L			Central Mam
mvd			I/L			Mamboru
mve			I/L			Marwari (Pakistan)
mvf			I/L			Peripheral Mongolian
mvg			I/L			Yucuañe Mixtec
mvh			I/L			Mulgi
mvi			I/L			Miyako
(mvj)			I/L			Todos Santos Cuchumatán Mam
mvk			I/L			Mekmek
mvl			I/E			Mbara (Australia)
(mvm)			I/L			Muya
mvn			I/L			Minaveha
mvo			I/L			Marovo
mvp			I/L			Duri
mvq			I/L			Moere
mvr			I/L			Marau
mvs			I/L			Massep
mvt			I/L			Mpotovoro
mvu			I/L			Marfa
mvv			I/L			Tagal Murut
mvw			I/L			Machinga
mvx			I/L			Meoswar
mvy			I/L			Indus Kohistani
mvz			I/L			Mesqan
mwa			I/L			Mwatebu
mwb			I/L			Juwal
mwc			I/L			Are
(mwd)			I/L			Mudbura
mwe			I/L			Mwera (Chimwera)
mwf			I/L			Murrinh-Patha
mwg			I/L			Aiklep
mwh			I/L			Mouk-Aria
mwi			I/L			Labo; Ninde
(mwj)			I/L			Maligo
mwk			I/L			Kita Maninkakan
mwl		mwl	I/L		mirandês	Mirandese
mwm			I/L			Sar
mwn			I/L			Nyamwanga
mwo			I/L			Central Maewo
mwp			I/L			Kala Lagaw Ya
mwq			I/L			Mün Chin
mwr		mwr	M/L		मारवाड़ी	Marwari
mws			I/L			Mwimbi-Muthambi
mwt			I/L			Moken
mwu			I/E			Mittu
mwv			I/L			Mentawai
mww			I/L	Hmong–Mien		Hmong Daw
(mwx)			I/L	spurious language		Mediak
(mwy)			I/L	spurious language		Mosiro
mwz			I/L			Moingi
mxa			I/L			Northwest Oaxaca Mixtec
mxb			I/L			Tezoatlán Mixtec
mxc			I/L			Manyika
mxd			I/L			Modang
mxe			I/L			Mele-Fila
mxf			I/L			Malgbe
mxg			I/L			Mbangala
mxh			I/L			Mvuba
mxi			I/H		مُزَرَب	Mozarabic
mxj			I/L	Sino-Tibetan?	Miju	Geman Deng; Miju-Mishmi
mxk			I/L			Monumbo
mxl			I/L			Maxi Gbe
mxm			I/L			Meramera
mxn			I/L			Moi (Indonesia)
mxo			I/L			Mbowe
mxp			I/L			Tlahuitoltepec Mixe
mxq			I/L			Juquila Mixe
mxr			I/L			Murik (Malaysia)
mxs			I/L			Huitepec Mixtec
mxt			I/L			Jamiltepec Mixtec
mxu			I/L			Mada (Cameroon)
mxv			I/L			Metlatónoc Mixtec
mxw			I/L			Namo
mxx			I/L	Niger–Congo?	ߡߊ߬ߣߌ߲߬ߞߊ߬ߞߊ߲	Mahou; Mawukakan
mxy			I/L			Southeastern Nochixtlán Mixtec
mxz			I/L			Central Masela
mya	my	bur	I/L	Sino-Tibetan	မြန်မာဘာသာ	Burmese
myb			I/L			Mbay
myc			I/L			Mayeka
(myd)			I/L			Maramba
mye			I/L			Myene
myf			I/L			Bambassi
myg			I/L			Manta
myh			I/L			Makah
(myi)			I/L	spurious language		Mina (India)
myj			I/L			Mangayat
myk			I/L			Mamara Senoufo
myl			I/L			Moma
mym			I/L			Me'en
myo			I/L			Anfillo
myp			I/L		Hi'aiti'ihi'	Pirahã
(myq)			I/L	spurious language		Forest Maninka
myr			I/L			Muniche
mys			I/E			Mesmes
(myt)			I/L			Sangab Mandaya
myu			I/L			Mundurukú
myv		myv	I/L		эрзя	Erzya
myw			I/L			Muyuw
myx			I/L			Masaaba
myy			I/L			Macuna
myz			I/H			Classical Mandaic
mza			I/L			Santa María Zacatepec Mixtec
mzb			I/L		تومزابت	Tumzabt
mzc			I/L			Madagascar Sign Language
mzd			I/L			Malimba
mze			I/L			Morawa
(mzf)			I/L			Aiku
mzg			I/L			Monastic Sign Language
mzh			I/L			Wichí Lhamtés Güisnay
mzi			I/L			Ixcatlán Mazatec
mzj			I/L	Niger–Congo?	ߡߊ߬ߣߌ߲߬ߞߊ߬ߞߊ߲	Manya
mzk			I/L			Nigeria Mambila
mzl			I/L			Mazatlán Mixe
mzm			I/L			Mumuye
mzn			I/L			Mazanderani
mzo			I/E			Matipuhy
mzp			I/L			Movima
mzq			I/L			Mori Atas
mzr			I/L			Marúbo
mzs			I/L			Macanese
mzt			I/L			Mintil
mzu			I/L			Inapang
mzv			I/L			Manza
mzw			I/L			Deg
mzx			I/L			Mawayana
mzy			I/L			Mozambican Sign Language
mzz			I/L			Maiadomu

== Sources ==
- "ISO 639-2 Registration Authority". Library of Congress.
- "ISO 639-3 Registration Authority". SIL International.
- Lewis, M. Paul; Simons, Gary F.; Fennig, Charles D., eds. (2016). "Ethnologue: Languages of the World" (19th ed.). Dallas, Texas: SIL International.
