= ISO 639:a =

List of ISO 639-3 language codes starting with A

This is a list of ISO 639-3 language codes starting with A.

Index | a | b | c | d | e | f | g | h | i | j | k | l | m | n | o | p | q | r | s | t | u | v | w | x | y | z

Abbreviations are used in the table as follows:

- Scope: I = individual language, M = macrolanguage, S = special code
- Type: C = constructed, E = extinct (in recent times), H = historical (distinct from its modern form), L = living, S = special code

Deprecated codes are enclosed in (parentheses).

The column Family contains the generic English name of the language's family or macrolanguage.

ISO 639 codes			Scope/Type	Family	Language names	
639-3	639-1	639-2/B	Scope/Type	Family	Native	ISO name
aaa			I/L	Niger–Congo?		Ghotuo
aab			I/L	Atlantic–Congo		Alumu-Tesu
aac			I/L	Suki-Gogodala		Ari
aad			I/L	Sepik		Amal
aae			I/L	Indo-European		Arbëreshë Albanian
aaf			I/L	Dravidian		Aranadan
aag			I/L	Torricelli		Ambrak
aah			I/L	Torricelli		Abu' Arapesh
aai			I/L	Austronesian		Arifama-Miniafia
aak			I/L	Angan		Ankave
aal			I/L	Afro-Asiatic	afaë	Afade
(aam)			I/L	spurious language		Aramanik
aan			I/L	Tupian		Anambé
aao			I/L	Afro-Asiatic		Algerian Saharan Arabic
aap			I/L	Cariban		Pará Arára
aaq			I/E	Algic		Eastern Abnaki
aar	aa	aar	I/L	Afro-Asiatic	Qafar af	Afar
aas			I/L	Afro-Asiatic		Aasáx
aat			I/L	Indo-European		Arvanitika Albanian
aau			I/L	Sepik		Abau
aaw			I/L	Austronesian		Solong
aax			I/L	Trans–New Guinea		Mandobo Atas
(aay)			I/L	spurious language		Aariya
aaz			I/L	Austronesian		Amarasi
aba			I/L	Atlantic–Congo		Abé
abb			I/L	Atlantic–Congo		Bankon
abc			I/L	Austronesian		Ambala Ayta
abd			I/L	Austronesian		Manide
abe			I/L	Algic	Wôbanakiôdwawôgan	Western Abnaki
abf			I/L	Austronesian		Abai Sungai
abg			I/L	Trans–New Guinea		Abaga
abh			I/L	Afro-Asiatic		Tajiki Arabic
abi			I/L	Atlantic–Congo		Abidji
abj			I/E	Great Andamanese		Aka-Bea
abk	ab	abk	I/L	Northwest Caucasian	аԥсуа бызшәа	Abkhazian
abl			I/L	Austronesian		Lampung Nyo
abm			I/L	Atlantic–Congo		Abanyom
abn			I/L	Atlantic–Congo		Abua
abo			I/L	Atlantic–Congo		Abon
abp			I/L	Austronesian		Abellen Ayta
abq			I/L	Northwest Caucasian	абаза	Abaza
abr			I/L	Atlantic–Congo		Abron
abs			I/L	Austronesian		Ambonese Malay
abt			I/L	Ndu		Ambulas
abu			I/L	Atlantic–Congo	ɔbule ɔyʋɛ	Abure
abv			I/L	Afro-Asiatic		Baharna Arabic
abw			I/L	Trans–New Guinea		Pal
abx			I/L	Austronesian		Inabaknon
aby			I/L	Yareban		Aneme Wake
abz			I/L	Timor-Alor-Pantar		Abui
aca			I/L	Arawakan	Achawa	Achagua
acb			I/L	spurious language		Áncá
(acc)			I/L	spurious language		Cubulco Achí
acd			I/L	Atlantic–Congo		Gikyode
ace		ace	I/L	Austronesian	Bahsa Acèh; بهسا اچيه	Achinese
acf			I/L	French Creole	kwéyòl	Saint Lucian Creole French
ach		ach	I/L	Nilotic		Acoli
aci			I/E	Great Andamanese		Aka-Cari
ack			I/E	Great Andamanese		Aka-Kora
acl			I/E	Great Andamanese		Akar-Bale
acm			I/L	Afro-Asiatic		Mesopotamian Arabic
acn			I/L	Sino-Tibetan	Ngachang; အာချန်	Achang
acp			I/L	Atlantic–Congo		Eastern Acipa
acq			I/L	Afro-Asiatic		Ta'izzi-Adeni Arabic
acr			I/L	Mayan		Achi
acs			I/E	Macro-Jê		Acroá
act			I/L	Indo-European	Achterhooks	Achterhoeks
acu			I/L	Jivaroan		Achuar-Shiwiar
acv			I/L	Palaihnihan	Ajúmmááwí	Achumawi
acw			I/L	Afro-Asiatic		Hijazi Arabic
acx			I/L	Afro-Asiatic		Omani Arabic
acy			I/L	Afro-Asiatic		Cypriot Arabic
acz			I/L	Talodi		Acheron
ada		ada	I/L	Atlantic–Congo		Adangme
adb			I/L	spurious language		Atauran
add			I/L	Atlantic–Congo		Dzodinka; Lidzonka
ade			I/L	Atlantic–Congo		Adele
adf			I/L	Afro-Asiatic		Dhofari Arabic
adg			I/L	Pama–Nyungan		Andegerebinha
adh			I/L	Nilotic		Adhola
adi			I/L	Sino-Tibetan		Adi
adj			I/L	Atlantic–Congo	mɔjukru	Adioukrou
adl			I/L	Sino-Tibetan		Galo
adn			I/L	Timor-Alor-Pantar		Adang
ado			I/L	Lower Sepik-Ramu		Abu
(adp)			I/L	spurious language		Adap
adq			I/L	Atlantic–Congo		Adangbe
adr			I/L	Austronesian		Adonara
ads			I/L	West African gestural area		Adamorobe Sign Language
adt			I/L	Pama–Nyungan	Yura Ngawarla	Adnyamathanha
adu			I/L	spurious / Niger–Congo?		Aduge
adw			I/L	Tupian		Amundava
adx			I/L	Sino-Tibetan		Amdo Tibetan
ady		ady	I/L	Northwest Caucasian	Адыгабзэ	Adygei; Adyghe
adz			I/L	Austronesian		Adzera
aea			I/E	Pama–Nyungan		Areba
aeb			I/L	Afro-Asiatic	تونسي	Tunisian Arabic
aec			I/L	Afro-Asiatic		Saidi Arabic
aed			I/L	Sign Language		Argentine Sign Language
aee			I/L	Indo-European		Northeast Pashai; Northeast Pashayi
aek			I/L	Austronesian		Haeke
ael			I/L	Atlantic–Congo		Ambele
aem			I/L	Austroasiatic		Arem
aen			I/L	Sign Language		Armenian Sign Language
aeq			I/L	Indo-Aryan		Aer
aer			I/L	Pama–Nyungan		Eastern Arrernte
aes			I/E	isolate		Alsea
aeu			I/L	Sino-Tibetan		Akeu
aew			I/L	Keram		Ambakich
(aex)			I/L	spurious language		Amerax
aey			I/L	Trans–New Guinea		Amele
aez			I/L	Trans–New Guinea		Aeka
afb			I/L	Afro-Asiatic		Gulf Arabic
afd			I/L	Arafundi		Andai
afe			I/L	Atlantic–Congo		Putukwam
afg			I/L	isolate		Afghan Sign Language
afh		afh	I/C	constructed		Afrihili
afi			I/L	Lower Sepik-Ramu		Akrukay; Chini
afk			I/L	Arafundi		Nanubae
afn			I/L	Ijoid		Defaka
afo			I/L	Atlantic–Congo		Eloyi
afp			I/L	Arafundi		Tapei
afr	af	afr	I/L	Indo-European	Afrikaans	Afrikaans
afs			I/L	English Creole		Afro-Seminole Creole
aft			I/L	Nyimang		Afitti
afu			I/L	Atlantic-Congo		Awutu
afz			I/L	Lakes Plain		Obokuitai
aga			I/E	unattested		Aguano
agb			I/L	Atlantic–Congo		Legbo
agc			I/L	Atlantic–Congo		Agatu
agd			I/L	Trans–New Guinea		Agarabi
age			I/L	Trans–New Guinea		Angal
agf			I/L	Austronesian		Arguni
agg			I/L	Senagi		Angor
agh			I/L	Atlantic–Congo		Ngelima
agi			I/L	unattested		Agariya
agj			I/L	Afro-Asiatic		Argobba
agk			I/L	Austronesian		Isarog Agta
agl			I/L	East Strickland		Fembe
agm			I/L	Angan		Angaataha
agn			I/L	Austronesian		Agutaynen
ago			I/L	Angan		Tainae
(agp)			I/L	Austronesian		Paranan
agq			I/L	Atlantic–Congo	aghím	Aghem
agr			I/L	Jivaroan	awajun	Aguaruna
ags			I/L	Atlantic–Congo		Esimbi
agt			I/L	Austronesian		Central Cagayan Agta
agu			I/L	Mayan	awakateko	Aguacateco
agv			I/L	Austronesian		Remontado Dumagat
agw			I/L	Austronesian		Kahua
agx			I/L	Northeast Caucasian	агъул	Aghul
agy			I/L	Austronesian		Southern Alta
agz			I/L	Austronesian		Mt. Iriga Agta
aha			I/L	Atlantic–Congo		Ahanta
ahb			I/L	Austronesian		Axamb
(ahe)			I/L	spurious language		Ahe
ahg			I/L	Afro-Asiatic		Qimant
ahh			I/L	Trans–New Guinea		Aghu
ahi			I/L	Kru		Tiagbamrin Aizi
ahk			I/L	Sino-Tibetan		Akha
ahl			I/L	Atlantic–Congo		Igo
ahm			I/L	Kru		Mobumrin Aizi
ahn			I/L	Atlantic–Congo		Àhàn
aho			I/E	Tai–Kadai		Ahom
ahp			I/L	Atlantic–Congo		Aproumu Aizi
ahr			I/L	spurious language		Ahirani
ahs			I/L	Atlantic–Congo		Ashe
aht			I/L	Na-Dené		Ahtena
aia			I/L	Austronesian		Arosi
aib			I/L	Turkic		Ainu (China)
aic			I/L	Border		Ainbai
aid			I/E	Pama–Nyungan		Alngith
aie			I/L	Austronesian		Amara
aif			I/L	Torricelli		Agi
aig			I/L	English Creole		Antigua and Barbuda Creole English
aih			I/L	Tai–Kadai		Ai-Cham
aii			I/L	Afro-Asiatic	ܣܘܪܝܝܐ ܣܘܪܝܬ,ܐܬܘܪܝܐ ܣܘܪܝܝܐ	Assyrian Neo-Aramaic
aij			I/L	Afro-Asiatic		Lishanid Noshan
aik			I/L	Atlantic–Congo		Ake
ail			I/L	Bosavi		Aimele
aim			I/L	Sino-Tibetan		Aimol
ain		ain	I/L	isolate	アイヌ イタク(イタック)	Ainu (Japan)
aio			I/L	Tai–Kadai		Aiton
aip			I/L	Trans–New Guinea		Burumakok
aiq			I/L	Indo-European		Aimaq
air			I/L	Tor-Kwerba		Airoran
(ais)			I/L	Austronesian		Nataoran Amis
ait			I/E	Tupian		Arikem
aiw			I/L	South Omotic		Aari
aix			I/L	Austronesian		Aighon
aiy			I/L	Atlantic–Congo		Ali
(aiz)			I/L	Afro-Asiatic		Aari
aja			I/L	Kresh-Aja		Aja (South Sudan)
ajg			I/L	Atlantic–Congo		Aja (Benin)
aji			I/L	Austronesian		Ajië
ajn			I/L	Worroran		Andajin
(ajp)			I/L	Afro-Asiatic		South Levantine Arabic
ajs			I/L	village sign language		Algerian Jewish Sign Language
(ajt)			I/L	spurious language		Judeo-Tunisian Arabic
aju			I/L	Afro-Asiatic		Judeo-Moroccan Arabic
ajw			I/E	Afro-Asiatic		Ajawa
ajz			I/L	Sino-Tibetan		Amri Karbi
aka	ak	aka	M/L	Niger–Congo?	Akan	Akan
akb			I/L	Austronesian		Batak Angkola
akc			I/L	isolate		Mpur
akd			I/L	Atlantic–Congo		Ukpet-Ehom
ake			I/L	Cariban		Akawaio
akf			I/L	Niger–Congo		Akpa
akg			I/L	Austronesian		Anakalangu
akh			I/L	Trans–New Guinea		Angal Heneng
aki			I/L	Ramu		Aiome
akj			I/E	Great Andamanese		Aka-Jeru
akk		akk	I/H	Afro-Asiatic	akkadû	Akkadian
akl			I/L	Austronesian	Inakeanon	Aklanon
akm			I/E	Great Andamanese		Aka-Bo
(akn)			I/L	spurious language		Amikoana
ako			I/L	Cariban		Akurio
akp			I/L	Niger–Congo		Siwu
akq			I/L	Sepik		Ak
akr			I/L	Austronesian		Araki
aks			I/L	Niger–Congo		Akaselem
akt			I/L	Austronesian		Akolet
aku			I/L	Niger–Congo	aakuem	Akum
akv			I/L	Northeast Caucasian		Akhvakh
akw			I/L	Niger–Congo		Akwa
akx			I/E	Great Andamanese		Aka-Kede
aky			I/E	Great Andamanese		Aka-Kol
akz			I/L	Muskogean	Albaamo innaaɬiilka	Alabama
ala			I/L	Niger–Congo		Alago
alc			I/L	Alacalufan	alacalufe	Qawasqar
ald			I/L	Niger–Congo		Alladian
ale		ale	I/L	Eskimo-Aleut	Unangax tunuu	Aleut
alf			I/L	Niger–Congo		Alege
alh			I/L	Arnhem		Alawa
ali			I/L	Trans–New Guinea		Amaimon
alj			I/L	Austronesian		Alangan
alk			I/L	Austroasiatic		Alak
all			I/L	Dravidian		Allar
alm			I/L	Austronesian		Amblong
aln			I/L	Indo-European	gegnisht	Gheg Albanian
alo			I/L	Austronesian		Larike-Wakasihu
alp			I/L	Austronesian		Alune
alq			I/L	Algic	Anishnaabemowin (Omaamiwininimowin)	Algonquin
alr			I/L	Chukotko-Kamchatkan		Alutor
als			I/L	Indo-European	toskërishte	Tosk Albanian
alt		alt	I/L	Turkic	Алтай тили	Southern Altai
alu			I/L	Austronesian		'Are'are
alw			I/L	Afro-Asiatic		Alaba-K’abeena; Wanbasana
alx			I/L	Torricelli	Alatil	Amol
aly			I/L	Pama–Nyungan		Alyawarr
alz			I/L	Nilo-Saharan		Alur
ama			I/E	Tupian		Amanayé
amb			I/L	Niger–Congo		Ambo
amc			I/L	Pano-Tacanan		Amahuaca
(amd)			I/L	spurious language		Amapá Creole
ame			I/L	Arawakan	Yanešač	Yanesha'
amf			I/L	Afro-Asiatic		Hamer-Banna
amg			I/L	Iwaidjan		Amurdak
amh	am	amh	I/L	Afro-Asiatic	አማርኛ	Amharic
ami			I/L	Austronesian		Amis
amj			I/L	Nilo-Saharan		Amdang
amk			I/L	Austronesian		Ambai
aml			I/L	Austroasiatic		War-Jaintia
amm			I/L	Left May		Ama (Papua New Guinea)
amn			I/L	Border		Amanab
amo			I/L	Niger–Congo		Amo
amp			I/L	Sepik		Alamblak
amq			I/L	Austronesian		Amahai
amr			I/L	Otomakoan		Amarakaeri
ams			I/L	Japonic		Southern Amami-Oshima
amt			I/L	Amto-Musan		Amto
amu			I/L	Oto-Manguean		Guerrero Amuzgo
amv			I/L	Austronesian		Ambelau
amw			I/L	Afro-Asiatic	ܐܪܡܝܬ, آرامي	Western Neo-Aramaic
amx			I/L	Pama–Nyungan		Anmatyerre
amy			I/L	Northern Daly		Ami
amz			I/E	Pama–Nyungan		Atampaya
ana			I/E	Barbacoan		Andaqui
anb			I/E	Zaparoan		Andoa
anc			I/L	Afro-Asiatic		Ngas
and			I/L	Austronesian		Ansus
ane			I/L	Austronesian		Xârâcùù
anf			I/L	Niger–Congo		Animere
ang		ang	I/H	Indo-European	Englisc; Ænglisc	Old English (ca. 450-1100)
anh			I/L	Trans–New Guinea		Nend
ani			I/L	Northeast Caucasian		Andi
anj			I/L	Ramu		Anor
ank			I/L	Afro-Asiatic		Goemai
anl			I/L	Sino-Tibetan		Anu-Hkongso Chin
anm			I/L	Sino-Tibetan		Anal
ann			I/L	Niger–Congo		Obolo
ano			I/L	isolate		Andoque
anp		anp	I/L	Indo-European		Angika
anq			I/L	Ongan		Jarawa (India)
anr			I/L	Indo-European		Andh
ans			I/E	Chocoan		Anserma
ant			I/L	Pama–Nyungan		Antakarinya; Antikarinya
anu			I/L	Nilo-Saharan		Anuak
anv			I/L	Niger–Congo		Denya
anw			I/L	Niger–Congo		Anaang
anx			I/L	Austronesian		Andra-Hus
any			I/L	Niger–Congo		Anyin
anz			I/L	Yele-West New Britain		Anem
aoa			I/L	Portuguese Creole		Angolar
aob			I/L	Trans–New Guinea		Abom
aoc			I/L	Cariban		Pemon
aod			I/L	Ramu		Andarum
aoe			I/L	Trans–New Guinea		Angal Enen
aof			I/L	Torricelli		Bragat
aog			I/L	Ramu		Angoram
(aoh)			I/E	spurious language		Arma
aoi			I/L	Arnhem		Anindilyakwa
aoj			I/L	Torricelli		Mufian
aok			I/L	Austronesian		Arhö
aol			I/L	Austronesian		Alor
aom			I/L	Trans–New Guinea		Ömie
aon			I/L	Torricelli		Bumbita Arapesh
aor			I/E	Austronesian		Aore
aos			I/L	Border		Taikat
aot			I/L	Sino-Tibetan		A'tong; Atong (India)
aou			I/L	Tai–Kadai		A'ou
aox			I/L	Arawakan		Atorada
aoz			I/L	Austronesian		Uab Meto
apb			I/L	Austronesian		Sa'a
apc			I/L	Afro-Asiatic	شامي	Levantine Arabic
apd			I/L	Afro-Asiatic		Sudanese Arabic
ape			I/L	Torricelli		Bukiyip
apf			I/L	Austronesian		Pahanan Agta
apg			I/L	Austronesian		Ampanang
aph			I/L	Sino-Tibetan		Athpariya
api			I/L	Tupian		Apiaká
apj			I/L	Apache	Abáachi mizaa	Jicarilla Apache
apk			I/L	Apache		Kiowa Apache
apl			I/L	Apache		Lipan Apache
apm			I/L	Apache		Mescalero-Chiricahua Apache
apn			I/L	Macro-Jê		Apinayé
apo			I/L	Austronesian		Ambul
app			I/L	Austronesian		Apma
apq			I/L	Great Andamanese		A-Pucikwar
apr			I/L	Austronesian		Arop-Lokep
aps			I/L	Austronesian		Arop-Sissano
apt			I/L	Sino-Tibetan		Apatani
apu			I/L	Arawakan		Apurinã
apv			I/E	Nambikwaran		Alapmunte
apw			I/L	Apache	Ndéé biyáti'	Western Apache
apx			I/L	Austronesian		Aputai
apy			I/L	Cariban		Apalaí
apz			I/L	Trans–New Guinea		Safeyoka
aqc			I/L	Northeast Caucasian		Archi
aqd			I/L	Niger–Congo		Ampari Dogon
aqg			I/L	Niger–Congo		Arigidi
aqk			I/L	Niger–Congo		Aninka
aqm			I/L	Trans–New Guinea		Atohwaim
aqn			I/L	Austronesian		Northern Alta
aqp			I/E	isolate		Atakapa
aqr			I/L	Austronesian		Arhâ
aqt			I/L	Mascoian		Angaité
aqz			I/L	Tupian		Akuntsu
ara	ar	ara	M/L	Afro-Asiatic	العربية	Arabic
arb			I/L	Afro-Asiatic	لعربية	Standard Arabic
arc		arc	I/H	Afro-Asiatic	ܐܪܡܝܐ	Imperial Aramaic (700-300 BCE); Official Aramaic (700-300 BCE)
ard			I/E	Pama–Nyungan		Arabana
are			I/L	Pama–Nyungan		Western Arrarnta
(arf)			I/L	Arafundi		Arafundi
arg	an	arg	I/L	Indo-European	aragonés	Aragonese
arh			I/L	Chibchan		Arhuaco
ari			I/L	Caddoan	sáhniš	Arikara
arj			I/E	Tucanoan		Arapaso
ark			I/L	Macro-Jê		Arikapú
arl			I/L	Zaparoan		Arabela
arn		arn	I/L	Araucanian	Mapudungun	Mapuche; Mapudungun
aro			I/L	Pano-Tacanan		Araona
arp		arp	I/L	Algic	Hinono'eitiit	Arapaho
arq			I/L	Afro-Asiatic		Algerian Arabic
arr			I/L	Tupian		Karo (Brazil)
ars			I/L	Afro-Asiatic		Najdi Arabic
aru			I/E	Arawan		Arawá; Aruá (Amazonas State)
arv			I/L	Afro-Asiatic		Arbore
arw		arw	I/L	Maipurean		Arawak
arx			I/L	Tupian		Aruá (Rodonia State)
ary			I/L	Afro-Asiatic		Moroccan Arabic
arz			I/L	Afro-Asiatic		Egyptian Arabic
asa			I/L	Niger–Congo		Asu (Tanzania)
asb			I/L	Siouan	Nakʰóda	Assiniboine; Nakoda Assiniboine
asc			I/L	Trans–New Guinea		Casuarina Coast Asmat
(asd)			I/L	Trans–New Guinea		Asas
ase			I/L	French Sign		American Sign Language
asf			I/L	BANZSL		Auslan; Australian Sign Language
asg			I/L	Niger–Congo		Cishingini
ash			I/E	Tequiraca–Canichana		Abishira
asi			I/L	Trans–New Guinea		Buruwai
asj			I/L	Niger–Congo		Sari
ask			I/L	Indo-European		Ashkun
asl			I/L	Austronesian		Asilulu
asm	as	asm	I/L	Indo-European	অসমীয়া	Assamese
asn			I/L	Tupian		Xingú Asuriní
aso			I/L	Trans–New Guinea		Dano
asp			I/L	French Sign		Algerian Sign Language
asq			I/L	French Sign		Austrian Sign Language
asr			I/L	Austroasiatic		Asuri
ass			I/L	Niger–Congo		Ipulo
ast		ast	I/L	Indo-European	asturianu	Asturian; Asturleonese; Bable; Leonese
asu			I/L	Tupian		Tocantins Asurini
asv			I/L	Nilo-Saharan		Asoa
asw			I/L	(likely language family)		Australian Aborigines Sign Language
asx			I/L	Trans–New Guinea		Muratayak
asy			I/L	Trans–New Guinea		Yaosakor Asmat
asz			I/L	Austronesian		As
ata			I/L	Yele-West New Britain		Pele-Ata
atb			I/L	Sino-Tibetan	Tsaiwa	Zaiwa
atc			I/E	Pano-Tacanan		Atsahuaca
atd			I/L	Austronesian		Ata Manobo
ate			I/L	Trans–New Guinea		Atemble
(atf)			I/L	spurious language		Atuence
atg			I/L	Niger–Congo		Ivbie North-Okpela-Arhe
ati			I/L	Niger–Congo		Attié
atj			I/L	Algic	atikamekw nehiromowin	Atikamekw; Nehirowimowin
atk			I/L	Austronesian		Ati
atl			I/L	Austronesian		Mt. Iraya Agta
atm			I/L	Yele-West New Britain		Ata
atn			I/L	Indo-European		Ashtiani
ato			I/L	Niger–Congo		Atong (Cameroon)
atp			I/L	Austronesian		Pudtol Atta
atq			I/L	Austronesian		Aralle-Tabulahan
atr			I/L	Cariban	Kinja Iara	Waimiri-Atroari
ats			I/L	Algic		Gros Ventre
att			I/L	Austronesian		Pamplona Atta
atu			I/L	Nilo-Saharan		Reel
atv			I/L	Turkic		Northern Altai
atw			I/L	Hokan		Atsugewi
atx			I/L	Arutani–Sape		Arutani
aty			I/L	Austronesian		Aneityum
atz			I/L	Austronesian		Arta
aua			I/L	Austronesian		Asumboa
aub			I/L	Sino-Tibetan		Alugu
auc			I/L	isolate	Huao Terero	Waorani
aud			I/L	Austronesian		Anuta
(aue)			I/L	spurious language		ǂKxʼauǁʼein
aug			I/L	Niger–Congo		Aguna
auh			I/L	Niger–Congo		Aushi
aui			I/L	Austronesian		Anuki
auj			I/L	Afro-Asiatic		Awjilah
auk			I/L	Torricelli		Heyo
aul			I/L	Austronesian		Aulua
aum			I/L	Niger–Congo		Asu (Nigeria)
aun			I/L	Torricelli		Molmo One
auo			I/E	Afro-Asiatic		Auyokawa
aup			I/L	Trans–New Guinea		Makayam
auq			I/L	Austronesian		Anus; Korur
aur			I/L	Torricelli		Aruek
aut			I/L	Austronesian		Austral
auu			I/L	Trans–New Guinea		Auye
(auv)			I/L	Indo-European		Auvergnat
auw			I/L	Border		Awyi
aux			I/E	Tupian		Aurá
auy			I/L	Trans–New Guinea		Awiyaana
auz			I/L	Afro-Asiatic		Uzbeki Arabic
ava	av	ava	I/L	Northeast Caucasian	авар	Avaric
avb			I/L	Austronesian		Avau
avd			I/L	Indo-European		Alviri-Vidari
ave	ae	ave	I/H	Indo-European	avesta	Avestan
avi			I/L	Niger–Congo		Avikam
avk			I/C	constructed	Kotava	Kotava
avl			I/L	Afro-Asiatic		Eastern Egyptian Bedawi Arabic
avm			I/E	Pama–Nyungan		Angkamuthi
avn			I/L	Niger–Congo		Avatime
avo			I/E	Arawakan		Agavotaguerra
avs			I/E	Zaparoan		Aushiri
avt			I/L	Torricelli		Au
avu			I/L	Nilo-Saharan		Avokaya
avv			I/L	Tupian		Avá-Canoeiro
awa		awa	I/L	Indo-European	आवधी	Awadhi
awb			I/L	Trans–New Guinea		Awa (Papua New Guinea)
awc			I/L	Niger–Congo		Cicipu
awe			I/L	Tupian		Awetí
awg			I/E	Pama–Nyungan		Anguthimri
awh			I/L	Trans–New Guinea		Awbono
awi			I/L	Trans–New Guinea		Aekyom
awk			I/E	Pama–Nyungan		Awabakal
awm			I/L	Trans–New Guinea		Arawum
awn			I/L	Afro-Asiatic		Awngi
awo			I/L	Niger–Congo		Awak
awr			I/L	Lakes Plain		Awera
aws			I/L	Trans–New Guinea		South Awyu
awt			I/L	Tupian		Araweté
awu			I/L	Trans–New Guinea		Central Awyu
awv			I/L	Trans–New Guinea		Jair Awyu
aww			I/L	Trans–New Guinea		Awun
awx			I/L	Trans–New Guinea		Awara
awy			I/L	Trans–New Guinea		Edera Awyu
axb			I/E	Guaicuruan		Abipon
axe			I/E	Pama–Nyungan		Ayerrerenge
axg			I/E	unclassified		Mato Grosso Arára
axk			I/L	Niger–Congo		Yaka (Central African Republic)
axl			I/E	Pama–Nyungan		Lower Southern Aranda
axm			I/H	Indo-European		Middle Armenian
axx			I/L	Austronesian		Xârâgurè
aya			I/L	Ramu		Awar
ayb			I/L	Niger–Congo		Ayizo Gbe
ayc			I/L	Aymaran		Southern Aymara
ayd			I/E	Pama–Nyungan		Ayabadhu
aye			I/L	Niger–Congo		Ayere
ayg			I/L	Niger–Congo		Ginyanga
ayh			I/L	Afro-Asiatic		Hadrami Arabic
ayi			I/L	Niger–Congo		Leyigha
ayk			I/L	Niger–Congo		Akuku
ayl			I/L	Afro-Asiatic		Libyan Arabic
aym	ay	aym	M/L	Aymaran	aymar	Aymara
ayn			I/L	Afro-Asiatic		Sanaani Arabic
ayo			I/L	Zamucoan		Ayoreo
ayp			I/L	Afro-Asiatic		North Mesopotamian Arabic
ayq			I/L	Sepik		Ayi (Papua New Guinea)
ayr			I/L	Aymaran		Central Aymara
ays			I/L	Austronesian		Sorsogon Ayta
ayt			I/L	Austronesian		Magbukun Ayta
ayu			I/L	Niger–Congo		Ayu
(ayx)			I/L	spurious language		Ayi (China)
(ayy)			I/E	spurious language		Tayabas Ayta
ayz			I/L	West Papuan		Mai Brat
aza			I/L	Sino-Tibetan		Azha
azb			I/L	Turkic		South Azerbaijani
azd			I/L	Uto-Aztecan		Eastern Durango Nahuatl
aze	az	aze	M/L	Turkic	Azərbaycan	Azerbaijani
azg			I/L	Oto-Manguean		San Pedro Amuzgos Amuzgo
azj			I/L	Azeri		North Azerbaijani
azm			I/L	Oto-Manguean		Ipalapa Amuzgo
azn			I/L	Uto-Aztecan		Western Durango Nahuatl
azo			I/L	Niger–Congo		Awing
(azr)			I/L	Austronesian		Adzera
azt			I/L	Austronesian		Faire Atta
azz			I/L	Uto-Aztecan		Highland Puebla Nahuatl

== Sources ==
- "ISO 639-2 Registration Authority". Library of Congress.
- "ISO 639-3 Registration Authority". SIL International.
- Lewis, M. Paul; Simons, Gary F.; Fennig, Charles D., eds. (2016). "Ethnologue: Languages of the World" (19th ed.). Dallas, Texas: SIL International.
