= Gedaged language =

Austronesian language

Gedaged
- Region: Madang Province, Papua New Guinea
- Native speakers: 7,000 (2003)
- Language family: Austronesian: Malayo-Polynesian; Oceanic; Western Oceanic; North New Guinea ?; Ngero–Vitiaz; Bel; Nuclear Bel; Northern; Gedaged

Language codes
- ISO 639-3: gdd
- Glottolog: geda1237

Gedaged is an Austronesian language spoken by about 7000 people in coastal villages and on islands in Astrolabe Bay, Madang Province, Papua New Guinea.
