= TKV (disambiguation) =

TKV may refer to:

- Türk Kültür Vakfı, an organization established 1974 in Istanbul, Turkey
- TK-V, the Finnish sports team
- tkv, the ISO 639-3 code for Mur Pano language
- Tatakoto Airport, the IATA code TKV
- Tomahawk Regional Airport, the FAA LID code TKV
