= Awad Bing language =

Austronesian language spoken in Papua New Guinea

Awad Bing
- Biliau
- Native to: Papua New Guinea
- Region: Astrolabe Bay area, Madang Province
- Native speakers: (1,500 cited 2000)
- Language family: Austronesian: Malayo-Polynesian; Oceanic; Western Oceanic; North New Guinea ?; Ngero–Vitiaz; Bel; Astrolabe; Awad Bing

Language codes
- ISO 639-3: bcu
- Glottolog: awad1244

Awad Bing, or Biliau, is an Austronesian language spoken by about 1,100 people in seven villages near Astrolabe Bay, Madang Province, Papua New Guinea. Almost all speakers also use Tok Pisin as a second language. Awad Bing is also spoken by a few Ngaing for trading purposes.
