= Umboi Island =

Island in Papua New Guinea

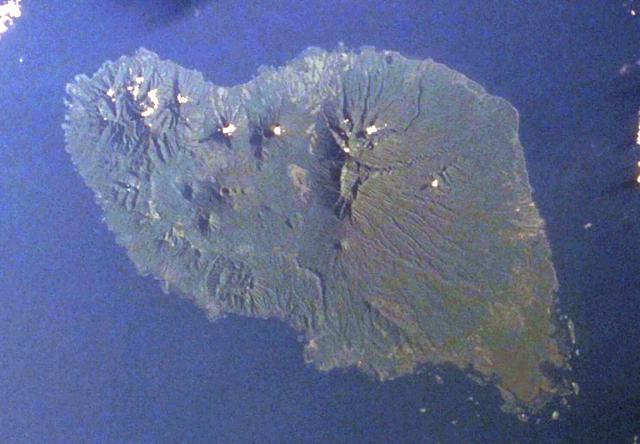
- Space Shuttle image of Umboi Island (north to upper left)

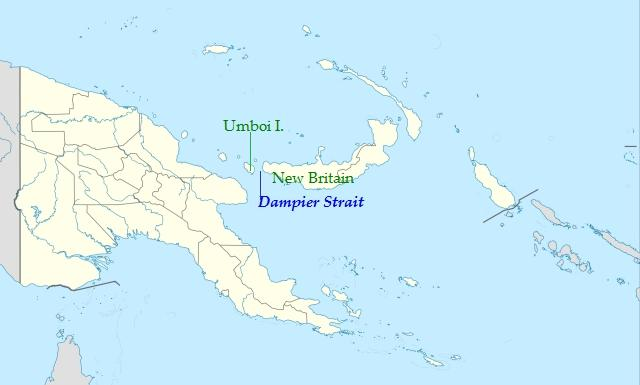
- Umboi Island is to the west of New Britain

Geography
- Coordinates: 5°32′S 147°52′E
- Archipelago: Bismarck Archipelago
- Area: 930 km^{2} (360 sq mi)
- Highest elevation: 1,335 m (4380 ft)
- Highest point: Mount Talo

Administration
- Papua New Guinea
- Province: Morobe Province
- LLG: Siassi Rural LLG

Umboi (also named Rook, Rooke or Siassi) is a volcanic island between the mainland of Papua New Guinea and the island of New Britain. It is separated from New Britain by the Dampier Strait, and from New Guinea's Huon Peninsula by the Vitiaz Strait. It has an elevation of 1,335 metres (4,380 feet).

Umboi Island is part of the Siassi Group, which contains a total of 18 islands, of which only seven are inhabited.

== History ==
During the mid-1920s, the population of the Siassi Islands was a little over 700 people. It had more than doubled (to almost 1,700 people) by the early 1960s, and then decreased to a little more than 1,600 people by the early 1980s.

In 1936, a Lutheran mission was established on the island which was headed by Pastor P.H. Freund. In 1940, Freund was recruited by Lt. Commander Eric Feldt of the Royal Australian Navy to act as a Coastwatcher.

The island was briefly occupied in 1943 by five hundred Japanese troops from the 51st Reconnaissance Regiment, which was commanded by Col. Jiro Sato. By early December 1943, after several Allied bombing runs, the Japanese withdrew from the island.

== Inhabitants ==
The Siassi support themselves through traditional barter across the Dampier and Vitiaz Straits; engaging in and facilitating the trade of food-related items like yams, taro, and pigs, as well as wares like pots and ornate wooden bowls. The building of canoes is also a notable supplemental source of trade for the Siassi, while fishing provides an important dietary staple. The people of the Siassi Islands continue to believe in witchcraft and consider it to be the root cause of unfortunate events such as illness or crop failure. The regional word for witchcraft is sanguma and the accused are often murdered. Representatives from the United Nations have denounced violence stemming from sanguma-based accusations, which includes exile, torture, and execution, as gender-based violence and human rights violations.

== Buildings ==
A majority of the buildings on the Siassi Islands are constructed using vernacular architecture.

== Languages ==
The languages spoken are Papuan Kovai, as well as the Austronesian languages of Barim, Lukep, Mangap, and Tuam-Mutu.

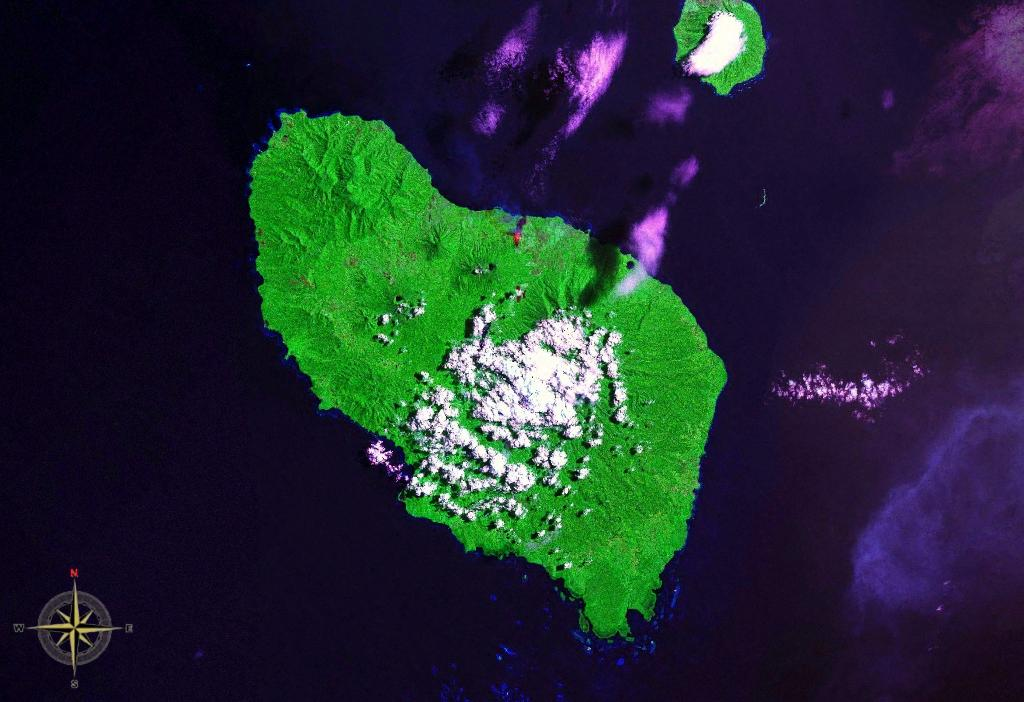
Umboi Island seen from space. Also visible is Sakar Island. (false color)

== Volcano ==
The volcano is described as a complex Holocene volcano; (Note: A Holocene volcano is defined as one that has erupted a minimum of one time during the Holocene epoch.) however, neither ancient nor modern humans have described any eruptions in the historic record.

== Folklore ==
Local folklore claims that a winged creature with a prehistoric appearance, referred to as the Ropen, can be observed flying around the skies of this and surrounding islands. The alleged animal has also been described as having bioluminescent characteristics, and has been the subject of inquiry by cryptozoologists, though no definitive evidence has ever been discovered.

== See also ==
- List of volcanoes in Papua New Guinea
- Siassi Rural LLG
