= Ann Chowning =

American anthropologist (1929–2016)

- Born: Martha Ann Chowning; April 18, 1929
- Died: February 25, 2016 (aged 86); Auckland
- Education: University of Pennsylvania
- Scientific career
- Fields: linguistics, anthropology, archaeology
- Workplaces: Australian National University, University of Papua New Guinea, Victoria University of Wellington
- Thesis: Lakalai Society (1958)

Martha Ann Chowning (18 April 1929 – 25 February 2016) was an American anthropologist, ethnographer, archaeologist and linguist known for her work on the peoples, languages, cultures and histories of Oceania.

== Biography ==
Chowning was born on 18 April 1929, in Little Rock, Arkansas. Raised in Arkansas, Chowning studied Spanish at Bryn Mawr College and anthropology at Barnard College, Columbia, before beginning her PhD in anthropology at the University of Pennsylvania in 1952. There she was taught by Ward Goodenough, who engaged her in a project on the Lakalai people of Papua New Guinea. After finishing her PhD in 1957, Chowning subsequently revisited the Lakalai many times between the 1960s and 1990s, and carried out comparative fieldwork on Molima, Sengseng, and Kove.

Chowning held an assistant professorship in anthropology at Barnard College, Columbia University, from 1960 to 1965, and was Senior Research Fellow in social anthropology at the Australian National University from 1965 to 1970. In 1970 she was appointed associate professor of anthropology at the University of Papua New Guinea, before moving to the Victoria University of Wellington to take up a position as Professor and Chair of the Department of Anthropology in 1977. Chowning retired in 1995. She died on 25 February 2016 in Auckland, New Zealand.

== Research ==
Chowning's work was interdisciplinary, bridging language, ethnography and history. She has made substantial contributions to Oceanic comparative linguistics, and her Lakalai-English dictionary is perhaps the largest dictionary of any Western Oceanic language.

== Selected works ==
- Chowning, Ann, and Ward H. Goodenough. 1965. Lakalai political organization. Anthropological Forum: A Journal of Social Anthropology and Comparative Sociology 1 (3–4), 412–473
- Chowning, Ann. 1969. The Austronesian languages of New Britain. Papers in linguistics of Melanesia 2, 17–46.
- Chowning, Ann. 1973. An introduction to the peoples and cultures of Melanesia. Addison-Wesley. Second edition 1977, published by Cummings.
- Chowning, Ann. 1979. Leadership in Melanesia. The Journal of Pacific History 14 (2), 66–84.
- Blust, Robert, David F. Aberle, N. J. Allen, R. H. Barnes, Ann Chowning, Otto Chr. Dahl, Jacques Faublée, James J. Fox, George W. Grace, Toichi Mabuchi, Kenneth Maddock, and Andrew Pawley. 1980. Early Austronesian Social Organization: The Evidence of Language. Current Anthropology 21 (2), 205–226.
- Chowning, Ann, and Ward H. Goodenough. 2016 [1954-]. A dictionary of the Lakalai (Nakanai) language of New Britain, Papua New Guinea. Asia-Pacific Linguistics Open Access.

== Awards and other honours ==
In 2005, Chowning was honoured with a Festschrift, A Polymath Anthropologist: Essays in Honour of Ann Chowning.

Chowning was awarded an Honorary Life Membership of the Association of Social Anthropologists of Aotearoa/New Zealand (ASAA/NZ).

Iris 'Ann Chowning' is a beardless iris, described as having "intense, velvety red flowers with deep yellow highlights", bred by Chowning's father, lawyer Frank Chowning, and presumably named in her honour.
