= Pano language =

Pano language may refer to:

- the Mur Pano language of New Guinea
- the Malasanga language of New Guinea
- the Panobo language of Peru
- one of the other Panoan languages
