= WAB =

WAB or Wab may refer to:

- Wab language, an Austronesian language
- Wab Kinew (born 1981), Canadian politician
- Wabash Railroad
- Warhammer Ancient Battles, a tabletop wargame
- Weebl and Bob
- Weekend at Bernie's, 1989 film
- Wengernalpbahn railway in Switzerland
- Werkverzeichnis Anton Bruckner, a catalogue of Anton Bruckner's works edited by Renate Grasberger
- Western Academy of Beijing, an international school in Beijing, China
- Western Aphasia Battery
- Windows Address Book
- Warwickshire Association for the Blind
- European Union (Withdrawal Agreement) Bill 2017–19
- Workers' Aid for Bosnia
- "W.A.B" (an acronym of Weak-Ass Bitch), a song by Megan Thee Stallion from her mixtape Fever
