= Karore language =

Austronesian language spoken in Papua New Guinea

Karore
- Region: parts of West New Britain Province, Papua New Guinea
- Native speakers: 550 (2003)
- Language family: Austronesian: Malayo-Polynesian; Oceanic; Western Oceanic; North New Guinea; Ngero–Vitiaz; Southwest New Britain; Arawe–Pasismanua; Pasismanua; Karore

Language codes
- ISO 639-3: xkx
- Glottolog: karo1298
- ELP: Karore
- Karore is classified as Vulnerable by the UNESCO Atlas of the World's Languages in Danger.

Karore is an Austronesian language spoken by about 550 individuals between the Andru and Johanna Rivers in West New Britain Province, Papua New Guinea on the island of New Britain.
