= Kaulong language =

Austronesian language spoken in Papua New Guinea

Kaulong
- Pasismanua
- Region: parts of West New Britain Province, Papua New Guinea
- Native speakers: (4,000 cited 2000)
- Language family: Austronesian: Malayo-Polynesian; Oceanic; Western Oceanic; North New Guinea; Ngero–Vitiaz; Southwest New Britain; Arawe–Pasismanua; Pasismanua; Kaulong

Language codes
- ISO 639-3: pss
- Glottolog: kaul1240

Kaulong, also known as Pasismanua, is an Austronesian language spoken by about 4,000 swidden farmers of the southwest hinterlands of Kandrian District, West New Britain Province, Papua New Guinea on the island of New Britain.

== Phonology ==
Consonants
	Labial	Alveolar	Dorsal
Plosive	p	t	k
Prenasalized	ᵐb ⟨b⟩,⟨mb⟩	ⁿd ⟨d⟩,⟨nd⟩	ᵑɡ ⟨g⟩,⟨ngg⟩
Fricative	β ⟨w⟩	s	h
Nasal	m	n	ŋ ⟨ng⟩
Approximant		r, l	

- The prenasalised stops /ᵐb ⁿd ᵑɡ/ are oral [b d g] word-initially.
- /β/ has the allophone /w/ when preceding back vowels.
- /t/ often appears as a tap [ɾ] when between vowels in rapid speech.

Vowels
	Front	Central	Back
High	i iː		u uː
Mid	e eː		o oː
Low		a aː	

Additionally, Kaulong has the following diphthongs: /ei/, /ai/, /oi/, /ae/, /au/, /io/, /iu/, /ua/, /ue/, /ui/, /uo/.
