= KOVE =

KOVE may refer to:

- the ICAO code for Oroville Municipal Airport, in Oroville, California, United States
- KOVE (AM), a radio station (1330 AM) licensed to Lander, Wyoming, United States
- KOVE-FM, a radio station (106.5 FM) licensed to Galveston, Texas, United States
- Kove (musician), English electronic musician born as James Rockhill, known for the song "Way We Are"
- Kove language, an Austronesian language of Papua New Guinea
