= Ham language =

Ham may refer to:

- Hyam language of Nigeria
- Ham dialect of the Masana language of Chad
- Marik language of Papua New Guinea
