= Solong =

Solong may refer to:

- Solong language, of Papua New Guinea
- Sulayman Solong (c. 1550–c. 1637), sultan of Darfur
- MV Solong, a container ship
