= MQZ =

MQZ may refer to:

- The ISO 639 code for the Malasanga language
- The IATA code for Margaret River Airport
