= Tami language =

Austronesian language spoken in Papua New Guinea

Tami
- Native to: Papua New Guinea
- Region: Morobe Province
- Native speakers: 2,100 (2010)
- Language family: Austronesian: Malayo-Polynesian; Oceanic; Western Oceanic; North New Guinea; Ngero–Vitiaz; Vitiaz; Tami

Language codes
- ISO 639-3: tmy
- Glottolog: tami1290

Tami is an Austronesian language on the Tami Islands and in a few villages at the tip of the Huon Peninsula in Morobe Province, Papua New Guinea. It is not closely related to the other Huon Gulf languages, but like other North New Guinea languages in Morobe Province, its basic word order is subject–verb–object (SVO).

== Phonology ==
Tami distinguishes five vowels (i, e, a, o, u) and the following consonants (Colich 1995). Voiced obstruents do not occur in syllable-final position, while glottal stop only occurs at the end of a syllable.

	Bilabial	Labiovelar	Dental	Alveopalatal	Velar	Glottal
Voiceless	p	pw	t		k	-c [ʔ]
Voiced	b	bw	d	j [d͡ʒ]	g	
Prenasalized	mb	mbw	nd	nj	ŋg	
Nasal	m	mw	n		ŋ	
Fricative	v [β]		s			
Liquid			l			
Approximant	w			y		

== Numerals ==
Traditional Tami counting practices begin with the fingers of the hands, then continue on the feet to reach twenty, which translates as 'whole person'. Higher numbers are multiples of 'whole person'. Nowadays, most counting above five is done in Tok Pisin. An alternate form of the numeral 'one', dan, functions as an indefinite article. Distributive numerals are formed via reduplication: lualu 'two by two', tolatol 'three by three' and so forth (Bamler 1900:204).

Numeral	Term	Gloss
1	te	'one'
2	lu	'two'
3	tol	'three'
4	pat	'four'
5	lim	'five, hand'
6	lim ma te	'hand and one'
7	lima ma lu	'hand and two'
8	lima ma tol	'hand and three'
9	lim ma pat	'hand and four'
10	limantalu	'hands both'
20	damo monte	'person whole'
