= Kelana language =

Kelana may be :

- Gitua language
- Kala language
