= Bebeli language =

Austronesian language spoken in Papua New Guinea

Bebeli
- Native to: Papua New Guinea
- Region: West New Britain Province
- Native speakers: 3,000 (2013)
- Language family: Austronesian: Malayo-Polynesian; Oceanic; Western Oceanic; North New Guinea; Ngero–Vitiaz; Southwest New Britain; Arawe–Pasismanua; Arawe; East; Bebeli

Language codes
- ISO 639-3: bek
- Glottolog: bebe1252
- ELP: Bebeli

Bebeli (Beli), or Kapore, is an Austronesian language of West New Britain, Papua New Guinea.
