= Ngero–Vitiaz languages =

Language family

Ngero–Vitiaz
- Geographic distribution: Northern New Guinea
- Linguistic classification: Austronesian: Malayo-Polynesian; Oceanic; Western Oceanic; North New Guinea; Ngero–Vitiaz
- Proto-language: Proto-Ngero–Vitiaz

Language codes
- Glottolog: nger1241

The Ngero–Vitiaz languages form a linkage of Austronesian languages in northern Papua New Guinea. They are spoken, from west to east, in Madang Province, Morobe Province, and New Britain.

== Classification ==
According to Lynch, Ross, & Crowley (2002), the structure of the family is as follows:

- Ngero–Vitiaz
  - Ngero family
    - Bariai linkage: Bariai, Kove, Lusi, Malalamai
    - Tuam linkage: Gitua, Mutu
  - Vitiaz linkage
    - Bel family
      - Astrolabe (East Bel) linkage: Awad Bing, Mindiri, Yote (Wab)
      - Nuclear Bel (West Bel) linkage: Marik (Dami, Ham), Gedaged, Bilibil, Takia, Matukar
    - Southwest New Britain linkage
      - Bibling linkage: Lamogai, Mouk-Aria
      - Pasismanua linkage: Aigon, Miu, Kaulong–Karore, Sengseng
      - Arawe linkage:
        - East Arawe: Akolet, Avau, Bebeli, Lesing-Gelimi
        - West Arawe: Solong, Apalik (Ambul), Gimi, Aiklep
        - ?Mangseng
    - Mengen family: Lote, Mamusi, Mengen
    - Maleu
    - Korap linkage: Arop-Lukep, Karnai, Malasanga, Mur Pano
    - Mbula
    - Roinji–Nenaya: Mato, Ronji
    - Sio
    - Tami
    - Amara
