= Lamogai language =

Austronesian language spoken in Papua New Guinea

Lamogai
- Native to: Papua New Guinea
- Region: parts of West New Britain Province
- Native speakers: (3,600 cited 1980)
- Language family: Austronesian: Malayo-Polynesian; Oceanic; Western Oceanic; North New Guinea; Ngero–Vitiaz; Southwest New Britain; Bibling; Lamogai

Language codes
- ISO 639-3: lmg
- Glottolog: lamo1244

Lamogai is an Austronesian language spoken by about 3600 individuals in parts of West New Britain Province, Papua New Guinea on the island of New Britain.

== Phonology ==
Consonants
	Labial	Alveolar	Velar
Plosive	p b	t d	k g
Fricative		s	
Nasal	m	n	ŋ
Approximant		r, l	

- The nasal consonants /m n ŋ/ can appear as the syllabic nasals [m̩ n̩ ŋ̍] word-initially.
- The nasal consonants /m n ŋ/ appear as prenasalised voiced stops [mb nd ŋg] before /r/.
- The voiced stops /b d g/ frequently manifest as fricatives [β ɹ ɣ] after vowels.
- /r/ is voiceless [r̥] word-finally.
- Sonorants /r l m n ŋ/ are voiceless [r̥ l̥ m̥ n̥ ŋ̊] in clusters after voiceless stops.

Vowels
	Front	Central	Back
High	i		u
Mid	e		o
Low		a	

- /i/ sporadically manifests as [ɯ] before /r/.

Stress tends to occur in penultimate position.
