= Mbula language =

Austronesian language spoken in Papua New Guinea

Mbula
- Native to: Papua New Guinea
- Region: Morobe Province
- Native speakers: 4,500 (2007)
- Language family: Austronesian: Malayo-Polynesian; Oceanic; Western Oceanic; North New Guinea; Ngero–Vitiaz; Vitiaz; Mbula

Language codes
- ISO 639-3: mna
- Glottolog: mbul1263
- Linguasphere: 34-BFB-aa

Mbula (also known as Mangap-Mbula, Mangaaba, Mangaawa, Mangaava, Kaimanga) is an Austronesian language spoken by around 2,500 people on Umboi Island and Sakar Island in the Morobe Province of Papua New Guinea. Its basic word order is subject–verb–object; it has a nominative–accusative case-marking strategy.

== Name ==
Mbula speakers generally display difficulty expressing a name for their language. Historically it has been referenced as Mangap or Kaimanga but Kaimanga is considered an offensive term along the lines of "unsophisticated bush person". Mangap is not in known use; however, Mangaaba is the name given to Mbula speakers by Siassi Islanders. Mbula is the only name known to have been used by Mbula speakers themselves, though many of them are unfamiliar with this.

== Language family and origin ==
Mbula is a member of the Oceanic group of Austronesian languages. It was originally proposed as a member of the Siassi language group which is a set of languages extending from Karkar Island in the Madang Province of Papua New Guinea, along the coast of Finschafen and across New Britain. However, more recent evidence suggests that it is a descendant of the Vitiaz Dialect Linkage. Its nearest genetic relations are the Kilenge and Maleu languages; its nearest geographic neighbour is the Papuan Kovai language.

== Location ==
Mbula speakers are generally located in seven villages: Gaura, Yangla, Birik, Marile, Kampalap, Kabi and Sakar. These villages are located on Sakar Island and the eastern half of Umboi Island. Both islands are inactive volcanoes and both are rich in game, timber and fish. Location has influenced the language in that there are many specific vocabulary items for species of fish, shells, canoes, nets, spears and a pair of motion verbs -pet 'to go out, appear, happen' and -le 'to enter' which specifically describe paths of motion which are radially outward toward the sea or radially inward from the sea.

== People and culture ==
Colonialism has had a fair impact on the culture of Mbula speakers. Missionization began in 1884 and the vast majority of Mbula speakers now identify themselves as Christian. Some traditions are retained from tribal religions; foremost among them are those concerning sorcery, white magic and divination. Two general types of magic are identified among speakers, naborou, a beneficial love magic used by many young men in their pursuit of young ladies and yaamba, a kind of mildly destructive magic used to curse and hurt others. A third kind, pu, is considered the most evil, used only to kill or disable people.

== Language contact ==
The Mangap-Mbula are part of a previously extensive trading network with bordering language groups, especially those in the Ngero language group of the Siassi islands which formed the hub of the trading network. As a result, approximately 65% of Mbula speakers are at least somewhat bilingual in Tok Pisin and some 30% speak and understand some Ngero. Due to missionization and other factors, 35% can speak and write English.

== Phonology ==
=== Consonants ===
The consonant phonemes of Mbula are as shown in the following table:

Consonant phonemes
		Bilabial	Dental/ Alveolar	Velar
Nasal		m	n	ŋ
Plosive	voiceless	p	t	k
Plosive	voiced	b	d	ɡ
Plosive	prenasal	ᵐb	ⁿd	ᵑɡ
Fricative	voiceless		s	
Fricative	voiced		z	
Lateral			l	
Trill			r	
Glide		w	j	

The consonant /b/ is realised as [β] intervocalically. Prenasalised stops, while requiring two phonetic units, exist as a single phonemic unit. The palatal glide /j/ is treated as being underlyingly vocalic in morphophonemic analysis while the labio-velar glide /w/ is analysed consonantally. All voiceless plosives, /p t k/, are optionally pronounced with a voiceless nasal release word finally. All velars are fronted or backed, depending on the vowel immediately contiguous to them within the same syllable. /t/ is palatalized to a voiceless, laminal, post-alveolar plosive when followed by a morpheme boundary and /i/.

=== Vowels ===
Mbula has five vowel phonemes as shown in the following table. Phonetically front vowels are unrounded and back vowels are rounded. /i/ and /u/ can be lax or tense and /e/ can be half close tense and half open lax. All vowels can be short or long, though this is interpreted in the phonology as a sequence of two vowels rather than as the existence of long vowel phonemes. The two high vowels /i/ and /u/ are lowered slightly when followed by /e/, /o/, or /a/.

Vowel phonemes
	Front	Central	Back
Close	i		u
Mid	e		o
Open		a	

Vowels are subject to two rules: penultimate lengthening, which means that external realisations may be long vowels while the underlying form is a short vowel, and epenthesis, which means the insertion of a vowel where the underlying form of the morpheme does not contain one. Epenthesis is regressive, which means that epenthetic vowels take on the quality of the first vowel in the rest of the form. Vowel length is contrastive as can be seen in the following examples:

short	long
[molo] – 'long'	[moːlo] – a type of ant
[mbili] – 'domestic animal'	[mbiːli] – 'new shoot of a plant'
[ipata] – 3SG 'be heavy'	[ipaːta] – 3SG 'reads'

=== Suprasegmentals ===
The placement of stress is predictable. In most words, primary stress falls on the penultimate syllable.

=== Syllable patterns ===
Syllable structure is generally (C)V(C). VV can sometimes form a syllable in the case of a diphthong or long vowel and syllable structure can be analysed as CCV when /w/ or /j/ is analysed as a C.

== Orthography ==
As stated above, vowel length is contrastive. What would be written phonetically as a: is represented by aa. All long vowels are written this way. All alveolars (/t/, /d/, /n/, /nd/) are dental-alveolars. They are represented in the orthography by t, d, n and nd. The /j/ sound is represented by y. The complete orthography of Mbula is as follows:

a	e	i	o	u	b	d	g	k	l	m	mb	n	nd	ŋ	ŋg	p	r	s	t	w	z	y
A	E	I	O	U	B	D	G	K	L	M	Mb	N	Nd	Ŋ	Ŋg	P	R	S	T	W	Z	Y

== Syntax and word classes ==
In an ideal grammar each classificatory word type would belong only to one category and in Mbula that is mostly the case. However, in the following three areas, word forms exist which are hard to nail down as one or the other:

1. verbs and prepositions
2. verbs and adverbs
3. verbs and instrumental nouns

The occurrence of a form in a wide range of conversational environments can result in the gradual loss of morphological features which are not appropriate to some particular conversational environments as well as the morphological gain of features which are appropriate to other conversational environments. This can mean ultimately either category shift of a word class or even just the general greying of the word classes as iron-clad categories.

=== Verbs and prepositions ===
Prototypical verbs and prototypical prepositions exist along a cline with verbs at the start, prepositions at the end, and multicategoried word types in the middle:

1. forms inflected with the subject prefixes which function syntactically only as predicates in sentences
2. forms not inflected with the subject prefixes which syntactically function only as predicates in sentences (the uninflected verbs discussed below in verbs)
3. forms potentially exhibiting subject agreement inflection which function syntactically as both predicates in sentences and in serial constructions (the prepositional verbs discussed below)
4. forms never exhibiting inflection and which function syntactically only as prepositions

=== Verbs and adverbs ===
Prototypical verbs and adverbs exist along a cline with verbs at the start, adverbs at the end and multicategoried word types in the middle:

1. inflected verbs which never occur as modifiers within the predicate phrase and never occur in cosubordinate adverbial predications
2. inflected verbs which never occur as modifiers within the predicate phrase, and can occur in either a preceding or following cosubordinate adverbial predication
3. uninflected verbs which never occur as modifiers within the predicate phrase, but which can occur in either a preceding or following cosubordinate adverbial predication
4. forms which can occur as modifiers in the predicate phrase after the object or occur as uninflected verbs in an adjacent cosubordinate adverbial predication
5. forms which occur immediately after the object and never function as predicates in an adjacent cosubordinate adverbial construction
6. forms which can occur immediately after the predicate and never function as a predicate in an adjacent cosubordinate adverbial construction

=== Verbs and instrumental nouns ===
Verbs and instrumental nouns crossover in that verbs theoretically derived from these nouns appear in an identical form. I.e., there is no overt morphological derivation which might indicate what direction the derivation has occurred in. Examples include:

- didi – 'wall'
- -didi – 'to wall in'
- peeze – 'paddle'
- -peeze – 'to paddle'
- kor – implement for sweeping
- -kor – 'to sweep up' using this implement
- ris – 'a line'
- -ris – 'to draw a line'

=== Nouns ===
There is no syntactic distinction between nouns and adjectives in Mbula. Nouns are syntactically distinguished by the following three characteristics:

1. They may function 'in isolation' (i.e. without any further syntactic modification) as arguments in a predication, a property that distinguishes them from non-inflecting stative verbs.
2. When functioning as the heads of noun phrases, nouns occur phrase initially with all modifiers following.
3. A subclass of nouns is morphologically distinguished by being obligatorily inflected with a set of genitive suffixes.

There are eight semantic features of noun referents which are especially important for characterising the morphosyntactic behaviour of Mbula nouns:

1. human referent
2. animate referent
3. potent (the referent of the noun can be viewed as the ultimate cause of some process which affects another entity)
4. concrete (the noun can potentially refer to a physical location to which, at which, or from which an event takes place)
5. temporal (the noun may be used to delineate the time at which an event takes place)
6. potentially consumable (the referent of the noun can be eaten or drunk)
7. individuated/count (the referent of the noun may be easily separated from its environment and may not be divided without changing its essential nature/character)
8. inalienable genitive (the referent of the item is inherently associated with some other entity)

=== Pronouns ===
Pronouns make the following person/number distinctions.

- 1 singular
- 1 dual exclusive
- 1 dual inclusive
- 1 plural exclusive
- 1 plural inclusive
- 2 singular
- 2 dual
- 2 plural
- 3 singular
- 3 dual
- 3 plural

Pronouns also inflect for nominative, accusative, referent and locative cases. Most pronouns are composed of an initial case marker plus a person-number marker. The nominative series of pronouns is generally used to encode animate participants which function as subjects. There are three demonstrative pronouns: ingi ('this one, these ones'), ina ('that one, those ones') and inga ('that one over there, those ones over there'). Accusative pronouns encode animate participants which function as objects. The referent pronouns encode virtually any animate oblique argument. Locative pronouns indicate an animate location toward which an action is taking place in dynamic predications, or at which an item is located. The locative form is also used to encode possession. Interrogative pronouns such as who, when, where, operate in a replacement fashion. That is, the interrogative pronoun is used in place of the normal syntactic position of the item being questioned.

=== Verbs ===
The characteristic syntactic function of verbs is to act as the heads of predications in which they occur. They are defined by a number of properties:

1. They typically index the person and number of the subject of the sentence.
2. They may contain transitivity-altering prefixes.
3. They may not function as noun-phrase modifiers in certain frames.

==== Uninflected verbs ====
There are several categories of non-inflecting verbs in Mbula:

1. stative experiential verbs
2. stative verbs encoding properties
3. verbs of manner
4. aspectual verbs

All of these non-inflecting verbs function only as predicates in clauses. Thus they cannot function as heads of noun phrases and they cannot function as restrictive modifiers of nouns unless they are relativised or nominalised. Syntactically, they resemble inflected verbs. They are only distinguished from other verbs morphologically.

=== Adverbials ===
This class is called adverbials and not adverbs because Mbula contains a large collection of words which are defined as modifiers of constituents other than nouns. Semantically, such forms typically encode notions of time, aspect, manner and modality.

=== Quantifiers ===
Quantifiers are uninflected forms which always occur in noun phrases following nouns, locative/alienable genitive pronouns, and attributive stative nouns, but before determiners, locative/alienable genitive prepositional phrases, relative clauses and demonstratives. The Mbula counting system is based upon the notions of five and twenty.

=== Prepositions ===
Prepositions are generally uninflected forms which govern a single noun phrase complement and relate it to a head or predicate. Mbula employs five categories of prepositions:

1. the referent preposition -pa- used for oblique arguments
2. the locative preposition -ki- used for animate goals towards which some entity moves, sites at which some entity is located and body parts which perceive something
3. the preposition -kembei- used to express resemblance, similarity or approximate equality (i.e., like, as)
4. the comitative and manner prepositions -ramaki-/-raama- used for accompaniment and manner
5. prepositional verbs discussed below

==== Prepositional verbs ====
These forms are a set of optionally inflected verbs which occur in serialisations functioning as case markers. As they may potentially contain inflection for third person singular in these serialisations, they depart from the typical uninflected preposition. However, they retain the prepositional function of relating a dependent noun phrase to a verbal head.

=== Demonstratives ===
==== Historical demonstratives and deictic expressions ====
Regarding the deictic term for 'that, there', there does not seem to be a major change in the pronunciation of the term in Mangap-Mbula (ina) from Proto-Malayo Polynesian (PMP; *i-na). However, the context in which ina is used has narrowed, as it is used anaphorically to mean 'that'.

==== Morpho-syntactic features ====
Demonstrative pronouns and spatial deictic expressions
Mangap-Mbula has three different free demonstrative pronouns which do not differentiate between singular and plural:

Table 1. Demonstratives.
iŋgi	this one/these ones
ina	that one/those ones
iŋga	that one over there, those ones over there

In Example 1, iŋgi is a free demonstrative used situationally and functions as a modifier of a singular noun phrase, as it is introducing the 'younger brother'. Additionally, iŋgi also has two other functions. The first is as the modal adverb meaning 'this is true now', and the second as a morphological part of the demonstratives tiŋgi and taiŋgi.

iŋgi nio tizi-ŋ.
this.one NOM.1SG younger.sibling-GEN.1SG
This is my younger brother.

Ina functions similarly to the third person pronouns ni and zin. It is frequently being used to refer to non-humans, and its main function is to reestablish a participant, who has already been introduced, as a topic or to single them out. In Example 2, ina is referring to two non-human, singular entities: the wallaby and the tree kangaroo. As the direct translation for each of these entities were not mentioned here, it can be inferred that they are both used anaphorically.

Wa ma la ma so=be me ti-se ki ta-sa na, reo. Pa ina, so=be me mboŋ, to-na ti-kam=i. Mi so=be me tau napumon=i na, ina i-rao ti-kam=i som.
2SG+walk+RED and 2SG+go and say=NF dog 3PL-ascend LOC SPEC-NON.REF GIV 2SG+look for that.on say=NF dog hunter then-GIV 3PL-get=ACC.3SG and say=NF dog SPEC bad.hunter=PROX GIV that.one 3SG-able 3PL-get=ACC.3SG NEG
You keep walking until the dogs happen to come upon one (a wallaby), and then look out. For it (=the wallaby), he dogs, if they are good hunters, then they will get it. But if they are bad hunters, then it (the tree kangaroo), they will not be able to get it.

In Example 3, iŋga is a free demonstrative used situationally and conveys two pieces of information: (1) the entity to which it is referring to, and (2) its location in reference to the speaker (i.e. a place adverb).

Iŋga i-kaam so?
that.one.over.there 3SG-do+RED what
What is that one/thing over there doing?

Locative adverbial forms
In Mangap-Mbula, there are no differences between deictic expressions that denote noun phrases and ones that denote location in sentences. Thus, they are considered as being a single form class.

Ti-kam uraata taŋga.
3PL-do work over.there
They worked over there.

Ruumu taŋga i-saana kek.
house over.there 3SG-deteriorate PERF
That house over there is ruined.

In Examples 4 and 5, taŋga is used situationally as a place adverb for where a group of people work and where in relation to the speaker, is the house located, respectively.

Problems with prepositions

Zin ti-kam uraata taŋga
NOM.3PL 3PL-do work over.there
They worked

Zin ti-kam uraata meleebe
NOM.3PL 3PL-do work below
They worked

Zin ti-kam uraata pa lele toro
NOM.3PL 3PL-do work in another place
They worked

Examples 6, 7, and 8 demonstrate that the demonstrative taŋga and the adverbial meleebe are semantically and positionally similar to the preposition phrase pa lele toro. This resemblance suggests that both could potentially fall under the same category of prepositional phrases, which further suggests that prepositions could be split into a transitive (location adverbs and demonstratives) and intransitive (true prepositions) sub-category. However, viewing things this way could have two issues: (1) the adverbial meleebe would have to be left as being noun phrase modifiers, but this could be due to the semantics; (2) the noun phrase shows the demonstrative occurring after the 'true' prepositiona' phrase with the noun phrase complement. But if both are deemed as coming from the syntactic group, why then would there be an ordering restriction? As a result of these problems, a demonstrative form class is recognised.

Noun phrases

man tatariigi ta-na
bird chicken SPEC-GIV
that chicken

moori sa ta-na
female NON.REF SPEC.GIV
that (hypothetical) woman (about whom I am talking)

ke ta nu mbotmbot pa ta-na
tree SPEC NOM.2SG 2SG+stay+RED REF SPEC-GIV
that tree where you are staying

In the examples given above, ta-na is used situationally as a determiner for either the chicken (Example 9), the woman (Example 10) or the tree (Example 11). Ta refers to the specific entity (i.e. 'that'), and na refers to the entity that has already been revealed in the sentence. In Example 10 however, the woman is not present situationally, but is referred to hypothetically.

There are two functions of tana: (1) as a demonstrative, or (2) to convey reason-result sequences. They are homophones. The demonstrative denotes (1) entities that are accessible or nearby the speaker and (2) textually revealed participants.

Motion verbs

Similar to many other Oceanic languages, Mangap-Mbula makes a three-way distinction depending on relative space: near speaker, near hearer or near neither. This sense of deictic orientation can be conveyed in motion verbs through the use of suffixes. These verbs often compound the root (which states the spatial positioning of motion) and the deictic orientation of motion in regards to the speaker and listener. This is shown in Table 2.

Table 2. Motion verb stems.
	Towards Speaker	Towards Hearer, not Towards Speaker	Towards neither Speaker nor Hearer
unoriented	-mar	-ma	-la
up	-se	-sa -ma	-sa-la
down	-su	-su -ma	-su-la
inwards	-le	-le -ma	-le-la
outwards	-pet	-pet-ma	-pe-ra

These are some examples:

Ni ko i-su.
NOM.3SG UC 3SG-descend
He will come down to me.

Nio ko aŋ-ma Mande.
NOM.1SG UC 1SG-come.to.you Monday
I will come to you on Monday.

Nio ko aŋ-su-ma.
NOM.1SG UC 1SG-descend-come.to.you
I will come down to you.

These are all examples of bound deictic morphemes.

==== Aerial comparison ====
Other Oceanic languages which share the same pronunciation for the term ina (meaning 'that, there') have a slightly different meaning, such as Suau and Motu, where ina means 'this', and Chuukese, where ina means 'there it is (by you)'. There are also other Oceanic languages with a closer meaning to Mangap-Mbula's ina, but have an additional sound at the beginning. They are Dobuan (where n-ina means 'that') and Nakanamanga (where wa-ina means 'that (distant)').

Mangap-Mbula is a noun-demonstrative order language. This order is usual for neighbouring languages in the Morobe Province, such as Sio and Selepet, as well as in West New Britain, such as Maleu and Amara. Examples 9, 10 and 11 demonstrate this lexical ordering.

=== Complementizers ===
Complementisers are uninflected forms which only govern a following sentence. The combination of a complementiser and a following sentence becomes the constituent in a noun or predicate phrase. Mbula contains seven types of complementiser:

1. kokena – lest (I don't want this to happen)
2. be ~ nothing – non-presupposition of factuality (I do not say this is something which has happened)
3. (ta)kembei – like (I think like this)
4. nothing – asserted factuality (I say this is something which has happened or is happening)
5. ta(u) ~ nothing – presupposed factuality (I know that this is something which has happened and I think you know about it too)
6. tabe – presupposed non-factuality (I know that this is something which has not happened and I think you know about it)
7. ki – habitual event (This is the kind of thing that is always happening)

=== Conjunctions ===
There are a great deal of conjunctions in Mbula that each encode their own subtly different meaning. However, all conjunctions fall broadly into four categories: temporal conjunctions, conditional conjunctions, causal conjunctions and disjunctions.

=== Interjections ===
There are a number of interjections in Mbula, all of which play no role in the grammar of the language, but which function to convey the speaker's attitudes and intentions. They always occur sentence initially and include the following examples:

- a – I want to say something
- ais – I want something
- ha – I hear something, I don't know what it is
- ii – I don't know
- lak – I want to ask you something
- som – I do not agree with you
- yo(o) – I say you did something good
- ywe – I think you are bad

== Morphology ==
Word structure in the Mbula language is not complex. There is little inflection of both nouns and verbs and few derivational processes. Most words in Mbula are mono-morphemic. Multi-morphemic words can be formed via the following processes:

- indexing on verbs for the person and number of the Subject
- inflection of inalienable nouns for the person and number of their genitives
- reduplication
- derivation of predicates to increase or decrease their transitivity
- compounding
- nominalisation

These processes will be discussed below.

=== Inflectional morphology ===
The only types of inflectional processes in the language are on verbs for the person and number of the subject, inflection of inalienable nouns for the person and number of their genitives as well as pronoun person/number distinctions.

==== Verbal inflection ====
Verbs typically index the person and number of the subject of the sentence with the following set of subject prefixes:

		singular	plural
1st person	exclusive	ang	am
1st person	inclusive	ang	t
2nd person		nothing ~ ku	k
3rd person		i	ti

==== Inflection of inalienable nouns ====
Mbula contains a class of nouns which are obligatorily inflected with genitive suffixes. Inalienable describes the semantic nature of the nouns. That is, they are semantically considered in speakers’ minds to be inalienable or inseparable from something. Examples include body parts and family members – concepts which exist in relation to something else, just the way an edge cannot exist without being the edge of something. Following is a list of the genitive suffixes:

		singular	plural
1st person	exclusive	ng	yam
1st person	inclusive	ng	ndV
2nd person		m	yom
3rd person		VnV	n

==== Pronoun inflection ====
Pronouns in Mbula inflect for first, second and third person as well as singular, dual and plural, as well as inclusive and exclusive in the first person. They also change depending on whether they are in the nominative, accusative, referent or locative case. The following table details the paradigm:

	Nominative	Accusative	Referent	Locative
1SG	nio	yo	pio	tio
2SG	nu ~ niwi	u	pu ~ piwi	ku ~ kiwi
3SG	ni	i	pini	kini
1DU.INCL	ituru			
1DU.EXCL	niamru			
2DU	niomru			
3DU	ziru			
1PL.INCL	iti	ti	piti	kiti
1PL.EXCL	niam	yam	piam	tiam
2PL	niom	yom	piom	tiom
3PL	zin	zin	pizin	kizin

=== Derivational morphology ===
The following types of derivation occur in Mbula: compounding of nouns and verbs, creation of nouns by means other than compounding, derivational devices which alter the transitivity of verbs, reduplication and some other minor processes. Compounding is not a very productive process in Mbula though is far more common in verbs than in nouns. Verbs can compound with adverbs, nouns and other verbs to create verbs. Nouns are more likely to be derived by the nominalising suffix -nga. When combined with adverbs it yields stative nouns; with nouns it can either signal an intensification of meaning or a slight change in meaning (with no intensification); it turns stative verbs into stative nouns and dynamic verbs into nouns. Semantically, -nga derivations tend to convey the idea of generic, habitual or characteristic actions. A further nominalisation suffix -i exists but is far less productive than -nga. Transitivity of predicates can be altered by the addition of one or more of the following prefixes: pa, par, and m, and these are extremely productive processes. Finally, reduplication can result in any one of the following meanings: plurality, distribution, intensification, diminution or habitual-durative action (action that is somehow extended).

== Sources ==
- Bugenhagen, Robert D. (1995). A Grammar of Mangap-Mbula: An Austronesian Language of Papua New Guinea. Canberra: Pacific Linguistics. doi:10.15144/PL-C101. hdl:1885/145877. ISBN 978-0-85883-426-2.
- Ross, Malcolm D. (2004). "The grammaticization of directional verbs in Oceanic languages". In Bril, Isabelle; Ozanne-Rivierre, Françoise (eds.). Complex Predicates in Oceanic Languages. Berlin, New York: Mouton de Gruyter. doi:10.1515/9783110913286. ISBN 978-3-11-018188-3.
- Senft, Gunter (2004). Deixis and demonstratives in Oceanic languages (PDF). Canberra: Pacific Linguistics. doi:10.15144/PL-562. ISBN 0-85883-551-7.
