= Mbula =

Mbula may be,

- Mbula language, New Guinea
- Mbula language (Nigeria)
- Judith Mbula Bahemuka
