= Bariai =

Bariai may be,

- Bariai language
- Heteragrion bariai, sp. damselfly
