= Lesing-Gelimi language =

Austronesian language spoken in Papua New Guinea

Lesing-Gelimi
- Lesing-Atui
- Amio-Gelimi
- Native to: Papua New Guinea
- Region: New Britain
- Native speakers: (2,000 cited 2000 census)
- Language family: Austronesian: Malayo-Polynesian; Oceanic; Western Oceanic; North New Guinea; Ngero–Vitiaz; Southwest New Britain; Arawe–Pasismanua; Arawe; East; Lesing-Gelimi
- Dialects: Lesing (Amio); Gelimi (Atui)

Language codes
- ISO 639-3: let
- Glottolog: lesi1239

Lesing-Gelimi, or Lesing-Atui, is an Austronesian language of New Britain, Papua New Guinea.
