= Mouk-Aria language =

Austronesian language spoken in Papua New Guinea

Mouk-Aria
- Native to: Papua New Guinea
- Region: coastal West New Britain Province
- Native speakers: (630 cited 1982)
- Language family: Austronesian: Malayo-Polynesian; Oceanic; Western Oceanic; North New Guinea; Ngero–Vitiaz; Southwest New Britain; Bibling; Mouk-Aria

Language codes
- ISO 639-3: mwh
- Glottolog: mouk1239

Mouk-Aria is an Austronesian language spoken by about 600 individuals along coastal West New Britain Province, Papua New Guinea on the island of New Britain.

== Phonology ==
Consonants
| | Labial | Alveolar | Dorsal |
|---|---|---|---|
| Plosive | p b | t d | k g |
| Fricative | | s | χ |
| Nasal | m | n | ŋ |
| Approximant | | l | |

- The nasal consonants /m n ŋ/ can appear as the syllabic nasals [m̩ n̩ ŋ̍] word-initially.
- The nasal consonants /m n ŋ/ sometimes appear as prenasalised voiced stops [mb nd ŋg] before /χ/.
- The voiced stops /b d g/ frequently manifest as fricatives [β ɹ ɣ] after vowels.
- /χ/ is voiced [ʁ] between voiced segments.
- Sonorants /l m n ŋ/ are voiceless [l̥ m̥ n̥ ŋ̊] in clusters after voiceless stops.

Vowels
| | Front | Central | Back |
|---|---|---|---|
| High | i | | u |
| Mid | e | | o |
| Low | | a | |

- /i e/ manifest as [ɯ ɤ] before /χ/.
