= Karnai language =

Austronesian language spoken in Papua New Guinea

Karnai
- Native to: Papua New Guinea
- Region: a handful of villages in Morobe and Madang Provinces
- Native speakers: (920 cited 2000)
- Language family: Austronesian: Malayo-Polynesian; Oceanic; Western Oceanic; Ngero–Vitiaz; Korap; Karnai

Language codes
- ISO 639-3: bbv
- Glottolog: karn1252

Karnai ('Barim') is an Austronesian language spoken by about 915 individuals in small villages near Wasu, Morobe Province, on Umboi Island, and near Saidor in Madang Province, Papua New Guinea.
