= Yote language =

Austronesian language spoken in Papua New Guinea

Yote
- Wab
- Native to: Papua New Guinea
- Region: Wab and Saui villages, Huon Peninsula, Madang Province
- Native speakers: (120 cited 2000)
- Language family: Austronesian: Malayo-Polynesian; Oceanic; Western Oceanic; North New Guinea ?; Ngero–Vitiaz; Bel; Astrolabe; Yote

Language codes
- ISO 639-3: wab
- Glottolog: wabb1237
- ELP: Wab
- Wab is classified as Vulnerable by the UNESCO Atlas of the World's Languages in Danger.

Yote or Wab is an Austronesian language spoken by about 120 people in the coastal villages of Wab and Saui, Madang Province, Papua New Guinea.
