= Miu language =

Austronesian language spoken in Papua New Guinea

Miu
- Region: southwest interior of West New Britain Province, Papua New Guinea
- Native speakers: (400 cited 2000)
- Language family: Austronesian: Malayo-Polynesian; Oceanic; Western Oceanic; North New Guinea; Ngero–Vitiaz; Southwest New Britain; Arawe–Pasismanua; Pasismanua; Miu

Language codes
- ISO 639-3: mpo
- Glottolog: miuu1237

Miu is an Austronesian language spoken by about 500 tropical forest agriculturists in the Gimi Rauto District of West New Britain Province, Papua New Guinea on the island of New Britain.
