= Mindiri language =

Austronesian language spoken in Papua New Guinea

Mindiri
- Native to: Papua New Guinea
- Region: along Rai Coast, Madang Province
- Native speakers: (80 cited 2000)
- Language family: Austronesian: Malayo-Polynesian; Oceanic; Western Oceanic; North New Guinea ?; Ngero–Vitiaz; Bel; Astrolabe; Mindiri

Language codes
- ISO 639-3: mpn
- Glottolog: mind1255
- ELP: Mindiri

Mindiri is an Austronesian language spoken by about eighty people in one village on the Rai Coast, Madang Province, Papua New Guinea.
