= Sengseng language =

Austronesian language spoken in Papua New Guinea

Sengseng
- Region: southwest interior of West New Britain Province, Papua New Guinea
- Native speakers: 1,800 (2003)
- Language family: Austronesian: Malayo-Polynesian; Oceanic; Western Oceanic; North New Guinea; Ngero–Vitiaz; Southwest New Britain; Arawe–Pasismanua; Pasismanua; Sengseng

Language codes
- ISO 639-3: ssz
- Glottolog: seng1281
- ELP: Sengseng
- Sengseng is classified as Vulnerable by the UNESCO Atlas of the World's Languages in Danger.

Sengseng is an Austronesian language spoken by about 1750 individuals in the southwest interior of West New Britain Province, Papua New Guinea, on the island of New Britain.
