= Lote language =

Austronesian language spoken in Papua New Guinea

Lote
- Native to: Papua New Guinea
- Region: East New Britain Province, Pomio District, southeast coast and inland near Cape Dampier.
- Native speakers: 5,500 (2004)
- Language family: Austronesian: Malayo-Polynesian; Oceanic; Western Oceanic; Ngero–Vitiaz; Mengen; Lote

Language codes
- ISO 639-3: uvl
- Glottolog: lote1237
- Coordinates: 5°57′S 150°54′E

Lote (also known as Lohote) is an Austronesian language spoken by about 6,000 people who live around Cape Dampier on the south coast of New Britain in Papua New Guinea. The language was earlier known as Uvol, after the name of a local river, where the first wharf and later airstrip were built.

== Phonology ==
The phonology of Lote is as follows:

=== Vowels ===
	Front	Central	Back
Close	i		u
Close-mid	e		
Mid	ɛ		ɔ
Open		a	

=== Consonants ===
		Bilabial	Alveolar	Velar	Glottal
Stop	voiceless	p	t	k	
Fricative	voiceless		s	x	h
Nasal		m	n	ŋ	
Lateral approximant			l		
Trill			r		
