= Avau language =

Oceanic language spoken in Papua New Guinea

Avau
- Region: West New Britain Province, Papua New Guinea
- Native speakers: 620 (2002)
- Language family: Austronesian: Malayo-Polynesian; Oceanic; Western Oceanic; North New Guinea; Ngero–Vitiaz; Southwest New Britain; Arawe–Pasismanua; Arawe; East; Avau
- Dialects: Gasmata

Language codes
- ISO 639-3: avb
- Glottolog: avau1237

Avau is an Austronesian language of West New Britain, Papua New Guinea.
