= Aigon language =

Austronesian language spoken in Papua New Guinea

Aigon
- Psohoh
- Region: parts of West New Britain Province, Papua New Guinea
- Native speakers: 2000 (2003)
- Language family: Austronesian: Malayo-Polynesian; Oceanic; Western Oceanic; North New Guinea; Ngero–Vitiaz; Southwest New Britain; Arawe–Pasismanua; Pasismanua; Aigon
- Dialects: Aighon; Psohoh (Apsokok); Bao (Do)

Language codes
- ISO 639-3: aix
- Glottolog: aigh1235

Aigon (Aighon) is an Austronesian language spoken by about 2000 individuals between the Avio and Amgen rivers in West New Britain Province, Papua New Guinea on the island of New Britain.
