= Akolet language =

Austronesian language spoken in Papua New Guinea

Akolet
- Native to: Papua New Guinea
- Region: West New Britain Province
- Native speakers: (2,000 cited 2000)
- Language family: Austronesian: Malayo-Polynesian; Oceanic; Western Oceanic; North New Guinea; Ngero–Vitiaz; Southwest New Britain; Arawe–Pasismanua; Arawe; East; Akolet

Language codes
- ISO 639-3: akt
- Glottolog: akol1237

Akolet is an Austronesian language of West New Britain, Papua New Guinea.
