= Matukar language =

Austronesian language spoken in Papua New Guinea

Matukar
- Native to: Papua New Guinea
- Region: north of Madang town, Madang Province
- Native speakers: 430 (2003)
- Language family: Austronesian: Malayo-Polynesian; Oceanic; Western Oceanic; North New Guinea ?; Ngero–Vitiaz; Bel; Nuclear Bel; Northern; Matukar

Language codes
- ISO 639-3: mjk
- Glottolog: matu1261

Matukar (also called Matukar Panau) is an Austronesian language spoken by about 400 people near Madang town, Madang Province, Papua New Guinea. It is universally spoken by its ethnic group.
