= Marik language =

Austronesian language spoken in Papua New Guinea

Marik
- Ham
- Native to: Papua New Guinea
- Region: around Gogol River, Madang Province
- Native speakers: (3,500 cited 1998)
- Language family: Austronesian: Malayo-Polynesian; Oceanic; Western Oceanic; North New Guinea ?; Ngero–Vitiaz; Bel; Nuclear Bel; Marik

Language codes
- ISO 639-3: dad
- Glottolog: mari1428

Marik, or Ham, is an Austronesian language spoken by 3,500 people in 10 villages around the Gogol River, Madang Province, Papua New Guinea.
