= Mangseng language =

Austronesian language spoken in Papua New Guinea

Mangseng
- Native to: Papua New Guinea
- Region: New Britain
- Native speakers: (2,500 cited 1998)
- Language family: Austronesian: Malayo-Polynesian; Oceanic; Western Oceanic; North New Guinea; Ngero–Vitiaz; Southwest New Britain; Arawe–Pasismanua; Arawe; Mangseng

Language codes
- ISO 639-3: mbh
- Glottolog: mang1403

Mangseng is an Austronesian language of New Britain, Papua New Guinea. It is a distinct branch of the Arawe dialect chain.

== Phonology ==
Consonants
		Labial	Dental	Alveolar	Velar
Plosive	voiceless	p		t	k
Plosive	voiced	b		d	g
Fricative		β ⟨v⟩	ð ⟨th⟩	s	
Nasal		m		n	ŋ ⟨ng⟩
Approximant				r, l	

- The voiced plosives /b d g/ present as [ᵐp ⁿt ᵑk] word-medially.
- The cluster /nr/ is phonetically [ndr].

Vowels
	Front	Central	Back
High	i		u
Mid-high	e		o
Mid-low	ɛ ⟨e⟩		ɔ ⟨o⟩
Low		a	

- The phonemes /e ɛ/ and /o ɔ/ are both written as ⟨e⟩ and ⟨o⟩ respectively.

Stress is penultimate.
