= Mamusi language =

Austronesian language spoken in Papua New Guinea

Mamusi
- Native to: Papua New Guinea
- Region: East New Britain Province
- Native speakers: (6,000 cited 1985)
- Language family: Austronesian: Malayo-Polynesian; Oceanic; Western Oceanic; Ngero–Vitiaz; Mengen; Mamusi
- Dialects: Mamusi; Melkoi (Kakuna)

Language codes
- ISO 639-3: kdf
- Glottolog: mamu1254

Mamusi is an Austronesian language of East New Britain Province in Papua New Guinea.
