= Lusi language =

Austronesian language spoken in Papua New Guinea

Lusi
- Kaliai
- Region: New Britain
- Native speakers: (2,000 cited 1994)
- Language family: Austronesian: Malayo-Polynesian; Oceanic; Western Oceanic; Ngero–Vitiaz; Ngero; Bariai; Lusi
- Dialects: Kaliai

Language codes
- ISO 639-3: khl
- Glottolog: lusi1240

Lusi is an Austronesian language of New Britain. Kaliai is a dialect.
