= Mato language =

Austronesian language spoken in Papua New Guinea

Mato
- Native to: Papua New Guinea
- Region: Morobe
- Native speakers: 580 (2002)
- Language family: Austronesian: Malayo-Polynesian; Oceanic; Western Oceanic; Ngero–Vitiaz; Roinji–Nenaya; Mato

Language codes
- ISO 639-3: met
- Glottolog: mato1252

Mato is a minor Austronesian language of northern Papua New Guinea just inside Morobe Province. Mato is also referred to by the names Nenaya, Nengaya, and Nineia. Mato language has two minor variations, Tabares and Remuk, and the two variations are each spoken in three separate villages. While Mato is surrounded by several other languages, this has no effect on the grammar changes within Mato boundaries. The linguistic situation is very stable, due in part to the geographical isolation of the Mato people.

== Linguistics ==
Tabares and Remuk show a cognate similarity of 96% and among cognates there is a regular phonetic variation that occurs in the velar fricative; otherwise, the cognate words are usually pronounced the same. The grammar between the dialects does not vary; when it does differ, the residents of the Mato area said the words could be pronounced either way and that it depended on the preference of the speaker. The only minor difference that separate the variations is the constant phoneme /x/.

(1) /xɑlux/ → [xɑ.»luʔ] 'door' (Tabares speaker)

/xɑlux/ → [ʔɑ.»luʔ] 'door' (Ramuk speaker)

(2) /buxu/ → [»bu.ɣu] 'pig' (Tabares speaker)

/buxu/ → [»bu.ʔu] 'pig' (Ramuk speaker)

(3) /bɑxi/ → [»bɑ.ɣ˞i] 'medicine' (Tabares speaker)

/bɑxi/ → [»bɑ.ʔi] 'medicine' (Ramuk speaker)

Speakers of the Ramuk dialect pronounce /x/ as [ʔ] in all environments. In the Tabares dialect, the velar fricative /x/ is released as [x] initially and [ɣ] (voiced) intervocalically, except when followed by the high front vowel /i/, where it is also retroflexed [ɣ˞].

The front mid-vowel /e/ is usually pronounced [ɛ] in word-final heavy syllables, but pronounced [e] elsewhere.

The back mid-vowel /o/ is pronounced [ɔ] in closed syllables in just a few words but pronounced [o] elsewhere.

The diphthong /ɑi/ is usually pronounced [e] in rapid speech, and the diphthong /ɑu/ is usually pronounced [o] in rapid speech.

=== Consonant phonemes ===
	Bilabial	Alveolar	Velar	Glottal
Plosive	p b	d t	k g	
Nasal	m	n	ŋ	
Fricative		s	x	h
Trill		r		
Approximant	w		j	
Lateral		l		

== Phonemic inventory ==
⟨a b d e g h i k l m n ng o p r s t u w x y⟩

⟨A B D E G H I K L M N Ng O P R S T U W X Y⟩

Sentence typology is subject–verb–object (SVO).
