= Bariai language =

Austronesian language spoken in Papua New Guinea

Bariai
- Kabana
- Native to: Papua New Guinea
- Region: New Britain
- Native speakers: 1,400 (2008)
- Language family: Austronesian: Malayo-Polynesian; Oceanic; Western Oceanic; Ngero–Vitiaz; Ngero; Bariai languages; Bariai

Language codes
- ISO 639-3: bch
- Glottolog: bari1286

Bariai (also known as Kabana) is an Austronesian language of New Britain.

== Name ==
The name Bariai, literally 'at the mangrove', is derived from bare 'mangrove' + -eai 'locative suffix'. The alternative name Kabana comes from the Amara language, meaning 'foreigner'.
