= Türk Kültür Vakfı =

Turkish foundation

Turkish Cultural Foundation (Turkish: Türk Kültür Vakfı) (TKV) is an organization established 1974 in Istanbul, Turkey by a group of American Field Service Intercultural Programs alumni and supporters of the AFS' ideals.

TKV aims to implement intercultural education programs in Turkey. In addition to AFS programs, the foundation does other projects that share similar aims with AFS programs. TKV is a founding member of EFIL (European Federation for Intercultural Learning) together with other AFS partner countries.

Since 1953, thousands of high school students have benefited from AFS programs in Turkey. TKV aims to introduce Turkish youth to other cultures and people around the world and contributes to world peace and friendship. TKV implements its programmes with its large body of volunteers, who are formed in an association called AFSGD (AFS Volunteers Association of Turkey).
