= Amara language =

Austronesian language spoken in Papua New Guinea

Amara
- Native to: Papua New Guinea
- Region: parts of West New Britain Province
- Native speakers: 230 (2011)
- Language family: Austronesian: Malayo-Polynesian; Oceanic; Western Oceanic; North New Guinea; Ngero–Vitiaz; Vitiaz; Amara

Language codes
- ISO 639-3: aie
- Glottolog: amar1272
- ELP: Amara

Amara is an Austronesian language spoken by about 1200 individuals along the northwest coast of West New Britain Province, Papua New Guinea on the island of New Britain. Speakers have close to 100% bilingualism with Bariai, and many also speak Tok Pisin.

== Phonology ==
Consonants
	Labial	Alveolar	Velar
Plosive	p b	t d	k g
Fricative		s	
Nasal	m	n	ŋ
Approximant		r, l	

- The voiced stops /b d g/ frequently manifest as fricatives [β ɹ ɣ] after vowels.

Vowels
	Front	Central	Back
High	i		u
Mid	e		o
Low		a	
