= West Arawe language =

Austronesian language spoken in Papua New Guinea

West Arawe
- Native to: Papua New Guinea
- Region: West New Britain Province
- Native speakers: (10,800 cited 1981–2000)
- Language family: Austronesian: Malayo-Polynesian; Oceanic; Western Oceanic; North New Guinea; Ngero–Vitiaz; Southwest New Britain; Arawe–Pasismanua; Arawe; West Arawe

Language codes
- ISO 639-3: Variously: apo – Apalik (Ambul) gip – Gimi (Loko) mwg – Aiklep aaw – Solong (Arowe)
- Glottolog: west2530

West Arawe is an Austronesian dialect chain of West New Britain, Papua New Guinea. The principal varieties are Apalik, Gimi, Aiklep, and Arawe proper (Solong).
