= Arop-Lokep language =

Language spoken in Papua New Guinea

Arop-Lokep
- Native to: Papua New Guinea
- Region: Vitiaz Strait
- Native speakers: (3,000 cited 2000 census)
- Language family: Austronesian: Malayo-Polynesian; Oceanic; Western Oceanic; Ngero–Vitiaz; Korap; Arop-Lokep
- Writing system: Latin

Language codes
- ISO 639-3: apr
- Glottolog: arop1243

Arop-Lokep (also spelled Arop-Lukep) is an Oceanic language spoken by 3,015 people (as of 2000) on four islands in the Siassi chain in the Vitiaz Strait in Papua New Guinea.

== Phonology ==
=== Vowels ===
	Front	Central	Back
Close	i	ɨ	u
Close-mid			o
Open-mid	ɛ		ɔ
Open	a		

/ɨ/ is rare.

=== Consonants ===
		Bilabial	Alveolar	Velar	Glottal
Stop	Voiceless	p	t	k	ʔ
Stop	Voiced	b	d	ɡ	
Nasal		m	n	ŋ	
Fricative			s		
Trill			r		
Lateral			l		

/ʔ/ is rare.
