= Maleu-Kilenge language =

Austronesian language spoken in Papua New Guinea

Maleu-Kilenge
- Lolo
- Native to: Papua New Guinea
- Region: western tip of Talasea District, West New Britain Province
- Native speakers: (8,000 cited 2000 census)
- Language family: Austronesian: Malayo-Polynesian; Oceanic; Western; North New Guinea; Ngero–Vitiaz; Vitiaz; Maleu-Kilenge
- Dialects: Maleu; Kilenge

Language codes
- ISO 639-3: mgl
- Glottolog: male1289

Maleu-Kilenge, also known as Lolo or Idne, is an Austronesian language spoken by several thousand swidden farmers in the Talasea District of West New Britain Province, Papua New Guinea.

== Phonology ==
Consonants
	Labial	Alveolar	Velar
Plosive	p	t	k
Fricative	β ⟨v⟩	s	ɣ ⟨g⟩
Nasal	m	n	ŋ
Approximant	w	r, l	

- The fricatives /β ɣ/ are pronounced [b g] following a homorganic nasal.
- The sequences /tn kŋ/ manifest as [n̥n ŋ̊ŋ].
- /w/ only occurs intervocalically.

Vowels
	Front	Central	Back
High	i		u
Mid-high	e		o
Mid-low	ɛ ⟨ë⟩		ɔ ⟨ö⟩
Low		a	

Additionally, Maleu-Kilenge has the following diphthongs: /ei/, /ai/, /oi/, /ae/, /ua/, /iu/, /ɛu/, /au/, /ou/, /ɔu/.

Haywood (1996) however only lists five vowels, /a e i o u/.

Stress occurs on the penultimate syllable.
