= Malalamai language =

Austronesian language spoken in Papua New Guinea

Malalamai
- Bonga
- Region: Madang Province
- Native speakers: 900 (2011)
- Language family: Austronesian: Malayo-Polynesian; Oceanic; Western Oceanic; Ngero–Vitiaz; Ngero; Bariai; Malalamai

Language codes
- ISO 639-3: mmt
- Glottolog: mala1489
- ELP: Malalamai

Malalamai, or Bonga (after the two villages in which it is spoken), is an Austronesian language of Madang Province, Papua New Guinea.

A sociolinguistic survey of the language was carried out in 2011 and can be found here: https://www.sil.org/resources/archives/43106
