= Mengen language =

Austronesian language spoken in Papua New Guinea

Mengen
- Poeng
- Native to: Papua New Guinea
- Region: New Britain
- Native speakers: (8,400 cited 1982)
- Language family: Austronesian: Malayo-Polynesian; Oceanic; Western Oceanic; Ngero–Vitiaz; Mengen languages; Mengen
- Dialects: Mengen; Poeng

Language codes
- ISO 639-3: mee
- Glottolog: meng1267

Mengen and Poeng are rather divergent dialects of an Austronesian language of New Britain in Papua New Guinea.

== Phonology ==
Consonants
		Labial	Alveolar	Dorsal	Uvular
Nasal		m	n	ŋ	
Plosive	voiceless	p	t	(k)	q
Plosive	voiced	b	(d)	g	
Fricative			s		
Rhotic			r		
Lateral			l		
Glide		(w)		(j)	

- Both palatalization and labialization [ʲ, ʷ] is said to occur in all consonants. Palatalized consonants only occur before back vowels, and labialized consonant sounds may occur before all vowels accept /u/.
- /k/ is typically pronounced as uvular [q], but can also be heard as a velar [k] in free variation.
- Gemination or length, may also occur among consonant sounds.
- Sounds /b, ɡ/ are pronounced as voiced stops [b, ɡ], but are also heard as fricatives [β, ɣ] in intervocalic position.
- /r/ may have variation between a trill [r], a tap [ɾ], or a voiced stop [d] within vocabulary.
- Sounds /j, w/ are said to exist as a result of palatalization or labialization, but only in very few root words in word-initial position.

Vowels
	Front	Back
High	i	u
Mid	e	o
Low		a

- Sounds /a, o/ are raised to [ʌ, o̝] within the environment of consonant length.
