= Gitua language =

Austronesian language spoken in Papua New Guinea

Gitua
- Native to: Papua New Guinea
- Region: Morobe Province
- Ethnicity: 900 (2000)
- Native speakers: (900 cited 2000)
- Language family: Austronesian: Malayo-Polynesian; Oceanic; Western Oceanic; Ngero–Vitiaz; Ngero; Tuam; Gitua

Language codes
- ISO 639-3: ggt
- Glottolog: gitu1237

Gitua is an Austronesian language of Morobe Province, Papua New Guinea.
