= Mutu language =

Austronesian language spoken in Papua New Guinea

Mutu
- Tuam
- Native to: Papua New Guinea
- Region: Morobe Province
- Native speakers: 3,500 (2007)
- Language family: Austronesian: Malayo-Polynesian; Oceanic; Western Oceanic; Ngero–Vitiaz; Ngero; Tuam languages; Mutu
- Dialects: Malai; Mutu (Oov); Tuam

Language codes
- ISO 639-3: tuc
- Glottolog: mutu1242

Mutu, or Tuam (Mutu-Tuam), is an Austronesian language of Morobe Province, Papua New Guinea.
