= Solong language =

Austronesian language spoken in Papua New Guinea

Solong
- Arawe
- Native to: Papua New Guinea
- Region: West New Britain Province
- Native speakers: (2,200 cited 1981)
- Language family: Austronesian: Malayo-Polynesian; Oceanic; Western Oceanic; North New Guinea; Ngero–Vitiaz; Southwest New Britain; Arawe–Pasismanua; West Arawe; Solong

Language codes
- ISO 639-3: aaw
- Glottolog: solo1258

Solong, also known as Arawe (Arove), is an Austronesian language of West New Britain, Papua New Guinea.
