= Mur Pano language =

Austronesian language spoken in Papua New Guinea

Mur Pano
- Pano
- Native to: Papua New Guinea
- Region: Madang Province
- Native speakers: 700–800 (2012); 1,000 total (2012).
- Language family: Austronesian: Malayo-Polynesian; Oceanic; Western Oceanic; Ngero–Vitiaz; Korap; Mur Pano

Language codes
- ISO 639-3: tkv
- Glottolog: murp1234
- Location of Mur village, where Mur Pano is spoken
- Coordinates: 5.6642°S 146.522°E

Mur Pano, or simply Pano, is an Austronesian language spoken by about three quarters of the thousand inhabitants of Mur village on the north coast of Madang Province, Papua New Guinea. The other quarter of the population speaks Molet as their primary language.
