= Kove language =

Austronesian language spoken in Papua New Guinea

Kove
- Region: New Britain
- Native speakers: (6,800 cited 1994)
- Language family: Austronesian: Malayo-Polynesian; Oceanic; Western Oceanic; Ngero–Vitiaz; Ngero; Bariai; Kove

Language codes
- ISO 639-3: kvc
- Glottolog: kove1237
- ELP: Kove

Kove is one of the Austronesian languages of New Britain which is spoken by the people of Papua New Guinea. The language is found in 18 villages with their populations totaling 9,000 people; however, most of the people are unfamiliar with the language. Instead of using the Kove language, many of them use Tok Pisin as their daily language.

== Change from Kove to Tok Pisin ==
Although in the past the Kove people had contact with foreign languages as a result of trading, the location where they lived was isolated enough that they maintained Kove as their daily language. This is caused by interacting with more people than they used to because of the increase in transportation. However, the younger generation, people who are below fifty, have begun to use Tok Pisin as their daily language. In addition, the language of education used in schools is not Kove, except one school which recently changed to Kove – but this does not mean that the student will use Kove outside of the class. Also, some Kove people are married to non-Kove speakers and use other languages in daily life rather than Kove. As a result, their child will learn the other language as their first language.

== Dialects ==
There are three dialects of Kove: East Kove, Central Kove, and West Kove. The Central Kove dialect is considered the standard variety of Kove. This is because the central Kove area is the place where the Kove ancestors first arrived. Additionally, it is the dialect that is closest to the original Kove language. In fact, the other two dialects, East Kove and West Kove, have changed slightly due to the languages around them.

== Morphology ==
=== Pronoun ===
The Kove independent pronouns are given in the following table.

	1 incl	1 excl	2	3
Singular	yau		veao	veai
Plural	taita	yai	amiu	asiri
Dual	tahua	yahua	amihua	asihua
Group	tangera	yangera	angera	asingera

The pronominal system for Kove is somewhat different from other Oceanic languages. Among the similarities that Kove and other Oceanic languages have is the use of first person, second person, and third person. They also separate the inclusive and the exclusive. Also, "gender is not encoded" as observed by Sato (2013). However, unlike other Oceanic languages, Kove only uses singular and plural for numbers. The pronominal system for Kove is separated into four functions: independent, subject marker, object, and possessive.

=== Morphosyntactic patterns ===
The grammar pattern in Kove is SV and AYO, "where S represents an intransitive subject, A a transitive subject, V a verb, and O a direct object" (Sato 2013).

== Phonology ==
=== Consonants ===
Kove consonants may be changed anytime due to the interaction with the language of Tok Pisin and English. All of the consonants can be combined with Kove vowels.

	Bilabial	Labiovelar	Alveolar	Palatal	Velar	Glottal
Stops	p b		t d		k g	
Prenasalized	ᵐb		ⁿd			
Nasals	m		n		ŋ	
Fricatives	β		s		ɣ	h
Approximant			ɹ			
Lateral			l			
Glides		w		j		

=== Vowels ===
In Kove, there are five vowels. The lips will round to produce the vowels /u/ and /o/. For vowels /i/, /e/, and /a/ the lips will not be rounded. Vowels can be at the beginning of the word or at the end of the word. Also, the same two vowels cannot be used together. For example, using the vowels /ii/ together is not allowed; however, there is one word that is uses the same two vowels which is /ee/ 'yes'. This example is the only case where two of the same vowels can appear next to each other.

	Front	Central	Back
High	i		u
Mid	e		o
Low		a	

Furthermore, if the vowels are followed by a velar nasal ng, then it will become a negative tense, except the vowel a.

=== Orthography ===
Some of the elementary schools in Kove use an orthography "that was established by elementary school teachers who were neither native speakers of Kove nor trained in linguistics" (Sato 2013). However, these teachers are unfamiliar with the system.

Phoneme	/a/	/e/	/i/	/o/	/u/	/p/	/b/	/t/	/d/	/k/	/g/	/mb/
Grapheme	⟨a⟩	⟨e⟩	⟨i⟩	⟨o⟩	⟨u⟩	⟨p⟩	⟨b⟩	⟨t⟩	⟨d⟩	⟨k⟩	⟨g⟩	⟨mb⟩
Phoneme	/nd/	/m/	/n/	/ŋ/	/β/	/s/	/ɣ/	/h/	/r/	/l/	/w/	/j/
Grapheme	⟨nd⟩	⟨m⟩	⟨n⟩	⟨ng⟩	⟨β⟩	⟨s⟩	⟨gh⟩	⟨h⟩	⟨r⟩	⟨l⟩	⟨w⟩	⟨y⟩

=== Stress patterns ===
There are two different types of stress in Kove; one is primary and the other is secondary. "Primary stress always falls on the penultimate syllable" and "secondary stress falls on every second syllable to the left of the syllable receiving primary stress".(Sato 2013).

=== Reduplication ===
Just like the other Oceanic languages, Kove has many words that are reduplicated. There are three type of reduplication in Kove. The first one which is full reduplication. The examples for this type of duplication is tama 'father' is reduplicated to tamatama 'father' in Kove. Also, ani 'eat' reduplicated to aniani 'be eating'. The second type of reduplication is leftward. For examples, pau 'new' is reduplicated to papau 'new' and tari 'younger parallel sibling and cousin' reduplicated to tatari 'younger parallel siblings and cousins'. The third type of reduplication is rightward, but this type of reduplication is rarely used in Kove.

=== Borrowing and adaptive phonology ===
Kove has also borrowed words from other languages, such as Austronesian languages like Anêm and Papuan due to trade. Some examples of loanwords are tavila 'large wooden bowl for pounding taro', amouru 'rain tree', ahila 'small-leafed rattan originating in the bush', rodya 'short and light yellow tapioca' (Sato 2013). As time passes, these words are fully incorporated into the Kove language. The number of loanwords is increasing due to increasing interaction with the outside world and easier transportation. Since Tok Pisin is used as a lingua franca, many new concepts for the Kove people take their names from the language. For example, the words for 'car', 'airplane', 'paper', 'money', and many more are from Tok Pisin.

== Word classes ==
Kove has three word classes: open lexical classes, closed lexical classes, and grammatical classes. Lexical class is also known as the part of speech and "grammatical words or morphemes are elements shared in the grammatical structure of clauses," according to Hiroko, which includes nouns and verbs. On the other hand, closed lexical classes include adjectives, adverbs, and cardinal numerals. The grammatical classes include adpositions, articles, causative markers, serialed verb unifiers, conjunctions, demonstratives, intransitive markers, locative demonstratives, nominalizers, particles, possessive markers, pronouns, reciprocal markers, tense, aspect, mood markers, and all other elements not included in the other two classes.
