= Vitiaz Strait =

Strait in Papua New Guinea

- Location within Papua New Guinea
- Coordinates: 6°S 148°E
- Type: strait

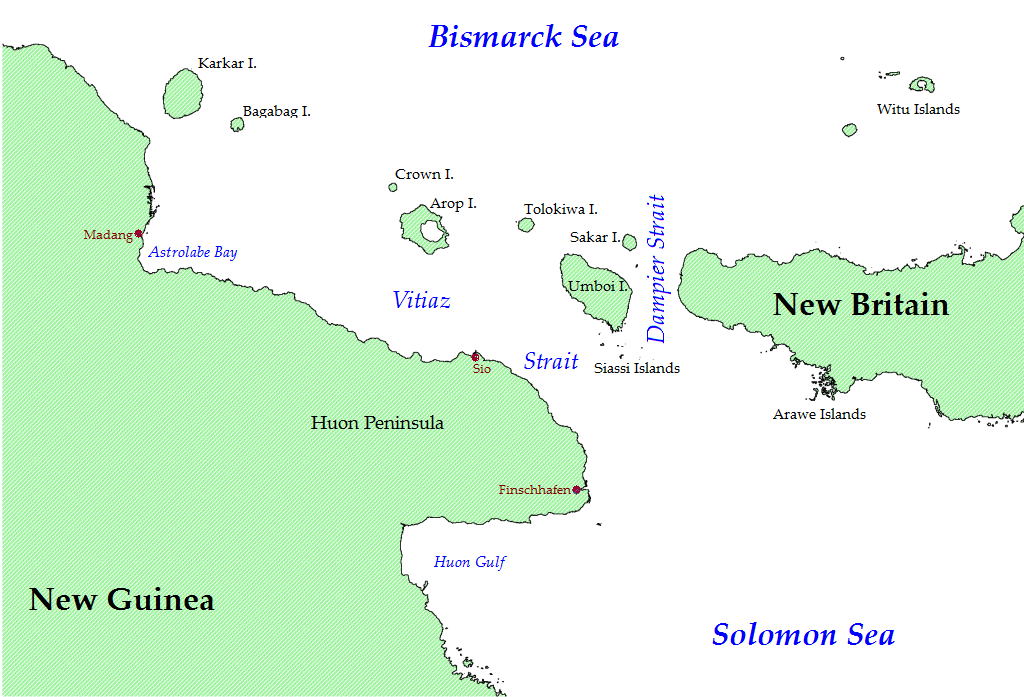
Northeastern New Guinea and Bismarck Archipelago (some smaller islands omitted)

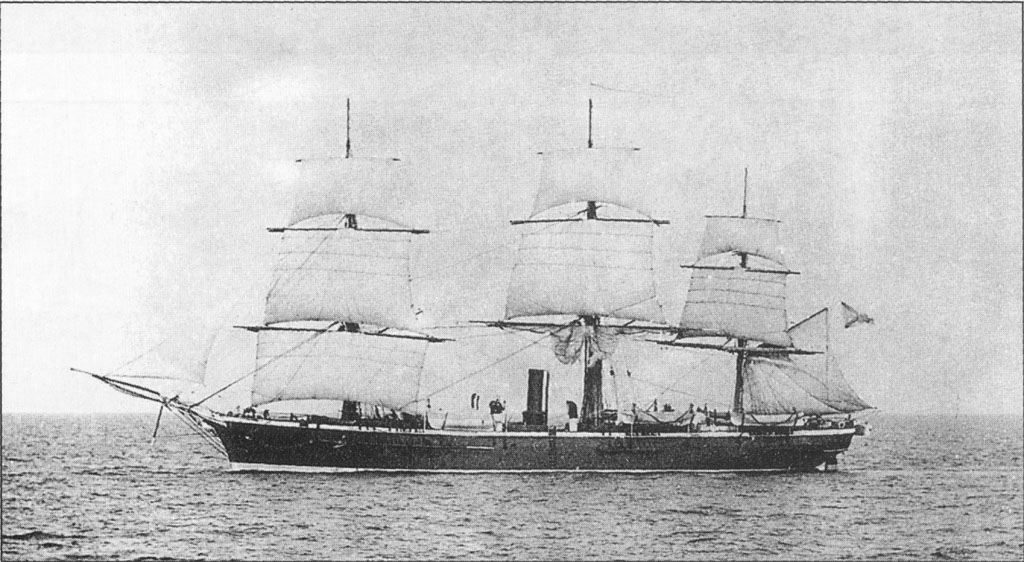
Imperial Russian corvette Vitiaz, namesake of the strait

The Vitiaz Strait is a strait between New Britain and the Huon Peninsula, northern New Guinea.

The Vitiaz Strait was so named by Nicholai Nicholaievich Mikluho-Maklai to commemorate the Russian corvette Vitiaz in which he sailed from October 1870 by way of South America and the Pacific Islands reaching Astrolabe Bay in September 1871.

== Hydrography ==
The 1200 m deep Vitiaz Strait "was a focus of attention by Australian and USA oceanographers on voyages in 1985, 1986, 1988, 1991 and 1992 as part of the Western Equatorial Pacific Ocean Circulation Study, WEPOCS".

The New Guinea Coastal Undercurrent transports "high-salinity, low-tritium, high-oxygen, low-nutrient water from the Solomon Sea northwestward along the north coast of Papua New Guinea through the Vitiaz Strait".

However, the surface layer current running through the strait, the New Guinea Coastal Current, experiences a seasonal reversal. In boreal summer (northern hemisphere summer) characterized by the south-easterly monsoon, the westward current dominates; during boreal winter (northern hemisphere winter) under the influence of the northwesterly monsoonal winds, the eastward flow dominates.

== European encounters ==
Abel Tasman sighted Umboi Island in the Vitiaz Strait in 1643 but failed to realise that the Strait separated the island from the coast of New Guinea. William Dampier charted the passage now named Dampier Strait between Umboi Island and New Britain in 1700 Dampier had established that the land mass he named New Britain was an island. As he sailed northwesterly through the passage, Dampier charted and named various islands which lay between the Dampier and Vitiaz Straits: Sir George Rook's Island (later Rooke Island, now Umboi Island), Long Island (Arop Island) and Crown Island.

== World War II ==
During the New Guinea Campaign (1942-1945), control of the Vitiaz Strait took on strategic military importance. The Japanese landed two battalions at Lae and Salamaua on the Huon Gulf on 8 March 1942 giving them control of the Dampier and Vitiaz Straits. Japanese forces lost control of the Vitiaz and Dampier Straits after the capture of Finschhafen by Australian troops and the later landing of American forces on New Britain (December 1943). General Douglas MacArthur announced that Rooke Island (now called Umboi Island) had been occupied on Saturday 12 February 1944 by American forces who met no opposition. Allied control was made secure by landings in the Admiralty Islands on 29 February 1944.
