= Malasanga language =

Austronesian language spoken in Papua New Guinea

Malasanga
- Pano
- Native to: Papua New Guinea
- Region: Morobe Province
- Native speakers: (1,200 cited 2000 census)
- Language family: Austronesian: Malayo-Polynesian; Oceanic; Western Oceanic; Ngero–Vitiaz; Korap; Malasanga
- Dialects: Singorokai; Malasanga

Language codes
- ISO 639-3: mqz
- Glottolog: mala1487

Malasanga or Pano is an Austronesian language spoken by about 900 individuals in two villages on the north coast of Morobe Province, Papua New Guinea.
