= Astrolabe Bay =

Bay in New Guinea

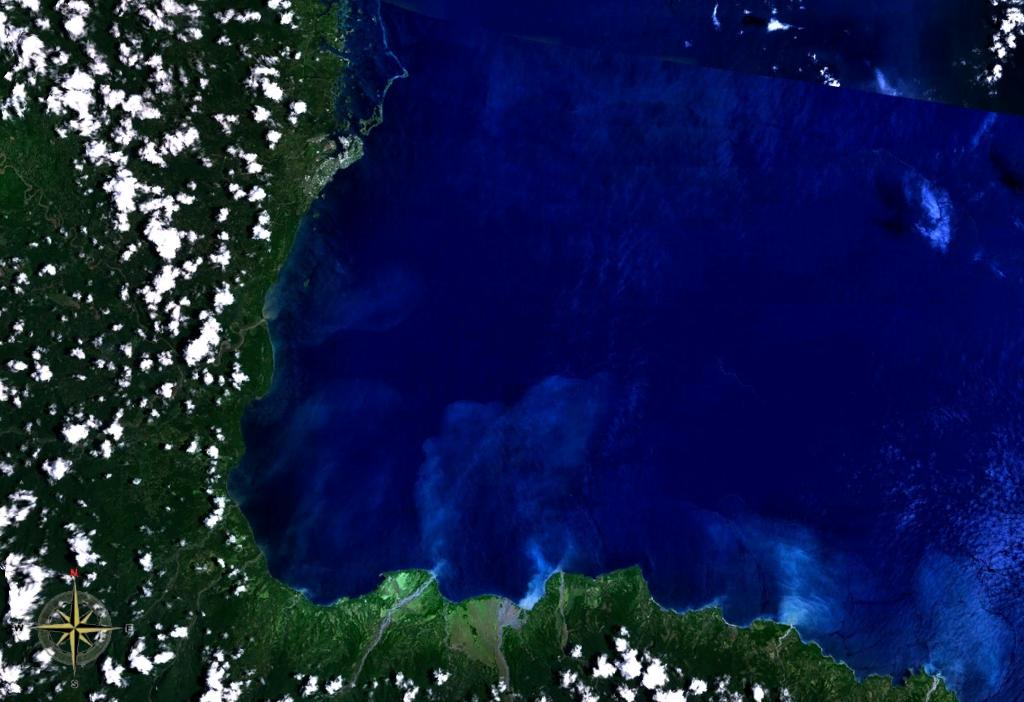
- Astrolabe Bay seen from space

- Location of Naval Base Alexishafen in Papua New Guinea
- Coordinates: 5.373243°S 145.828090°E
- Country: Papua New Guinea
- Province: Madang Province
- Time zone: UTC+10 (AEST)
- Climate: Af

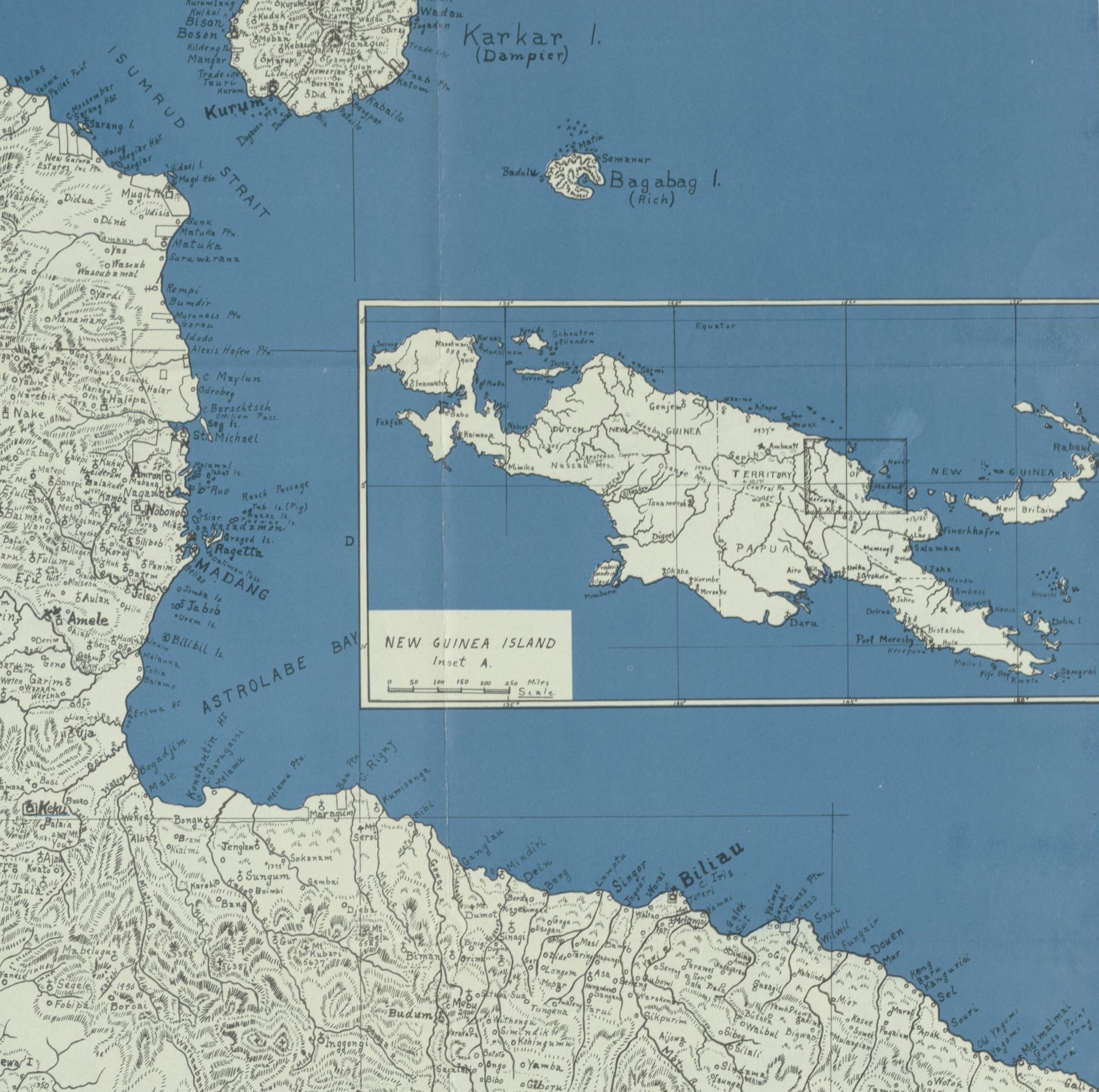
Map of Astrolabe Bay in 1936

Astrolabe Bay is a large body of water off the south coast of Madang Province, Papua New Guinea, located at 5.35°S 145.9166667°E. It is a part of the Bismarck Sea and stretches from the Cape Iris in the south to the Cape Croisilles to the north. It was discovered in 1827 by Jules Dumont d'Urville and named after his ship. Capital of Madang Province, Madang lies on the coast of Astrolabe Bay.

== See also ==
- Astrolabe Bay Rural LLG
- Naval Base Alexishafen
