= North New Guinea languages =

Western Oceanic languages

North New Guinea
- Geographic distribution: Northern New Guinea
- Linguistic classification: Austronesian: Malayo-Polynesian; Oceanic; Western Oceanic; North New Guinea
- Subdivisions: ? Sarmi–Jayapura family; Schouten linkage; Huon Gulf family; Ngero–Vitiaz linkage

Language codes
- Glottolog: nort3206

The North New Guinea languages of Papua New Guinea and Indonesia form a possible linkage of Western Oceanic languages. They have been in heavy contact with Papuan languages.

== Classification ==
According to Lynch, Ross, & Crowley (2002), the structure of the family is as follows:

- ? Sarmi–Jayapura family
- Schouten linkage
- Huon Gulf family
- Ngero–Vitiaz linkage

The center of dispersal was evidently near the Vitiaz Strait between New Britain and the New Guinea mainland.

The inclusion of Sarmi and Jayapura Bay is uncertain, and it may constitute a separate branch of Western Oceanic.
