= Morobe =

Morobe may refer to several places in Papua New Guinea:

- Morobe Province
- Morobe, Papua New Guinea
- Morobe Rural LLG in Papua New Guinea
- Morobe Goldfield (Wau)
- Morobe Bay
