= Wau =

Wau may refer to:

== Places and jurisdictions ==
=== Papua New Guinea ===
- Wau, Papua New Guinea
- Wau Airport (Papua New Guinea)
- Wau Rural LLG, (local level government)

=== South Sudan ===
- Wau State, South Sudan
- Wau, South Sudan, city
- Wau railway station
- Wau football stadium
- Wau River
- The Roman Catholic Diocese of Wau

== People ==
- Wau Holland (1951–2001), German computer security activist and journalist
- Nuelson Wau (born 1980), Dutch Antillean footballer
- Nyron Wau (born 1982), Dutch footballer

== Other ==
- WAU Animation, an animation studio in Malaysia
- Battle of Wau, a battle during World War II
- Wau Ecology Institute, an environment organisation in Papua New Guinea
- Wau (letter) or digamma, an obsolete Greek alphabet letter
- WAU! Mr. Modo Recordings, a record label
- Wau, a fictional alien race in the media franchise Tenchi Muyo!
- Wau bulan, a traditional kite in Malaysia
- Wau Holland Foundation, German non-profit organisation

== As an abbreviation ==
As an abbreviation, WAU or W.A.U. may refer to:

- Walk Among Us, a 1982 album by the American punk rock band Misfits
- Walkinshaw Andretti United, Australian motor racing team
- Warden Unit, a fictional AI system appearing in the video game Soma
- Washington Adventist University, a private Seventh-day Adventist university
- Weekly active users, a performance metric for the success of an internet product
- Windows Anytime Upgrade, an upgrade method offered by Microsoft Corporation

== See also ==
- WAW (disambiguation)
