= Walter Randolph Carpenter =

Australian-Canadian merchant and philanthropist

Sir Walter Randolph Carpenter
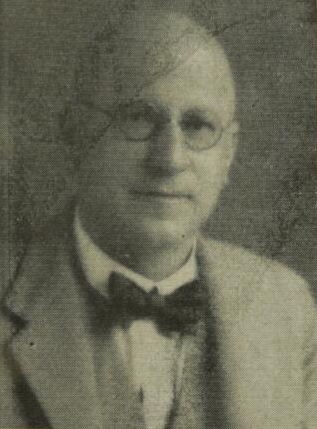
- Born: 31 October 1877
- Died: 1 February 1954 (aged 76)
- Known for: Entrepreneur, businessman

Sir Walter Randolph Carpenter (1877–1954) was an Australian-Canadian pearl hunting, trader, merchant, ship owner, airline industry leader and philanthropist of American ancestry active in the western Pacific from the 1890s through the 1940s.

== Career ==
In 1891, Carpenter left school at age 14 to join the Sydney office of Burns, Philp & Co, Limited. In 1895, he was transferred to the firm's office at Esperance, Western Australia, and in 1896 to the Thursday Island, Queensland office. In 1899, he resigned from Burns Philp, bought three luggers and established a family pearl-shelling business, J. B. Carpenter & Sons Ltd., of which he was managing director. In 1908, leaving his brother William Carpenter in charge, he left Thursday Island and rejoined Burns Philp. After a year at the company's offices in Sydney, he moved to Fiji and managed a subsidiary company purchased by Burns Philp.

In 1914 he formed the firm of W. R. Carpenter & Co. Ltd. in Sydney, and began establishing plantations, stores, trading stations, shipping services in the Southwest Pacific. When World War I erupted, he capitalized on the importance of copra for making munitions and as a food, and took enormous risks with resulting large profits which enabled his company to expand into New Guinea when the Australian government expropriated German property. The company branched out as major storekeepers, traders, and property owners in New Guinea and the Solomon Islands, establishing W. R. Carpenter & Co. (Papua New Guinea) Ltd. in 1919 and W. R. Carpenter & Co. (Solomon Islands) Ltd. in 1922.

In New Guinea, Carpenter took advantage of the development of the Morobe gold fields to acquire hotels in Wau and Bulolo, set up electrical power plants and cold storage facilities, and operated a fleet of inter-island steamers and a desiccated-coconut factory. In 1933 he established the first air service between Salamaua and Wau with two De Havilland Fox Moth aircraft, followed in 1934 by a direct shipping line between Australia, the Western Pacific, and European ports. In 1935 he launched an insurance company and in 1936 expanded his airline through a government-subsidized route between Rabaul and Australia.

At the outbreak of World War II Carpenter's ships and aircraft were commandeered by Australian and British forces, so in 1940 he travelled to the United States and purchased two freighters which he operated in the Pacific free of European control. He formed a new company in Canada and built a copra-crushing mill near Vancouver to access the North American market. His buildings and plantations in New Guinea and the Solomon, Gilbert, and Ellice islands were destroyed when Japan entered the war, but he continued to benefit from wartime prosperity in Fiji, and later received compensation for war damage to his holdings.

== Philanthropy ==
Carpenter was a generous philanthropist, counting among the public charities he supported the subsidizing of a home for destitute children, and donating a valuable house and a large amount in cash to the Commonwealth government for a 1935 jubilee maternity hospital, in addition to numerous other contributions to causes large and small in places where his company operated. WR Carpenters by market capitalisation was a top 100 Australian company up until the late 1980s.

== Personal ==
Walter Randolph Carpenter was born on 31 October 1877 at Singapore, Straits Settlements to Captain John Bolton Carpenter and his wife Emma Frances (née Griffin) Carpenter. John Bolton Carpenter was a merchant, whaler and sea captain who emigrated from New Haven, Connecticut, to Australia and Singapore as a result of American Civil War restrictions on his shipping business; Emma, daughter of a master mariner, was christened in Singapore.

On 18 December 1899, Carpenter married Edith Anderson, daughter of a sugar planter. He was knighted in 1936. In November 1941 they relocated with his new Canadian company to Vancouver, British Columbia, and in May 1948 became Canadian citizens. He died on 1 February 1954 at Killara, New South Wales, and was cremated with Anglican Rites. He was survived by his wife, two sons and three daughters. His sons succeeded him as managing directors of W. R. Carpenter & Co. Ltd., with his eldest son R. B. Carpenter as chairman.

== Legacy ==
Carpenter and his companies earned the gratitude of those who needed the services they provided in remote and underdeveloped locations and long-term credit to transact their business. Their success alienated some planters and small traders. W. R. Carpenter & Co. became a more visible representative of Australia's involvement in the southwest Pacific. They balanced business success with social success and there was debate in some circles. The company provided gainful employment for native peoples and essential services in the area it serves.
