= Tolokiwa Island =

Island in Papua New Guinea

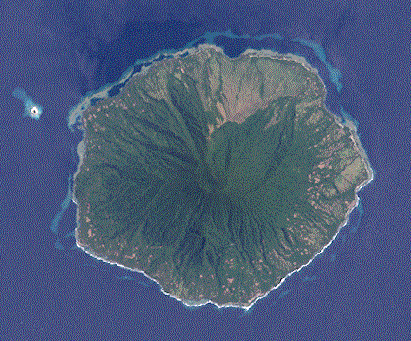

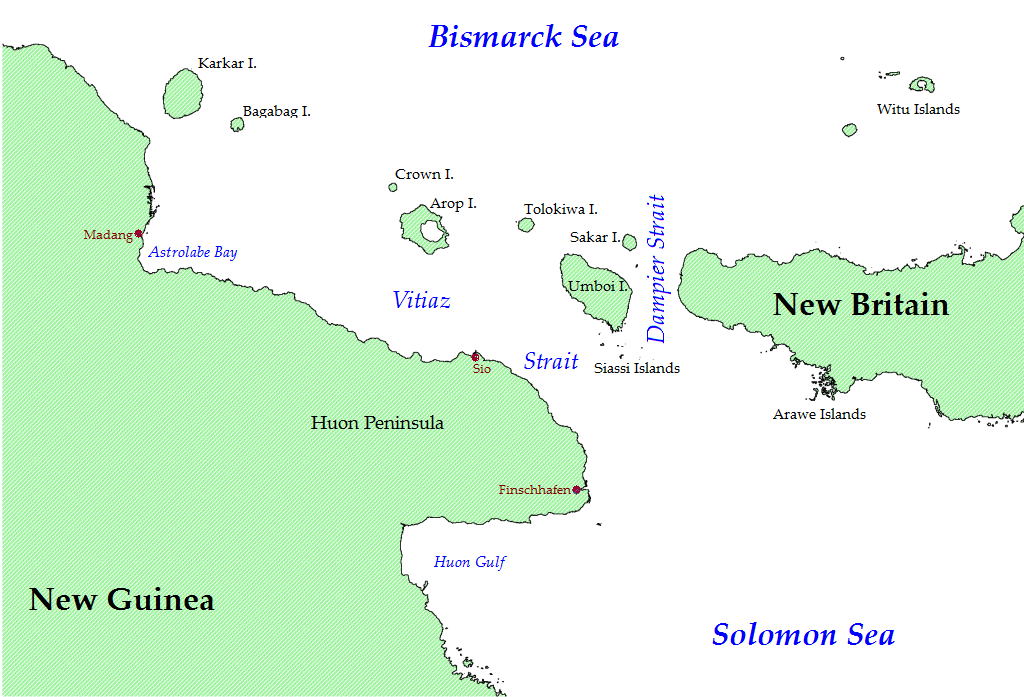
- Tolokiwa Island is to the west of New Britain

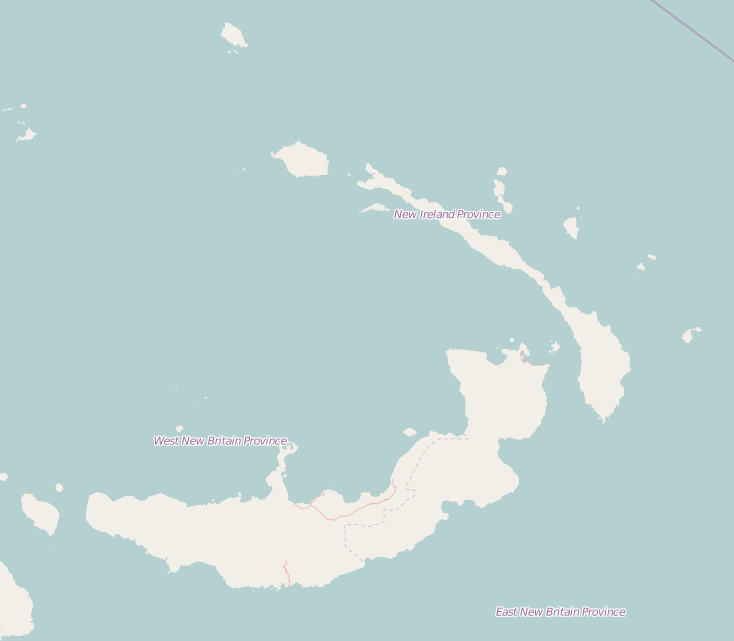
- Location within New Britain Location within Papua New Guinea

Geography
- Location: Bismarck Sea
- Coordinates: 5°19′S 147°36′E
- Archipelago: Bismark Archipelago

Administration
- Papua New Guinea
- Province: Morobe Province
- LLG: Siassi Rural LLG

Tolokiwa Island, also known as Lottin Island, is an island in the Bismarck Sea, situated between Long Island and Umboi. The island is volcanic in origin and part of the Bismarck Archipelago. It is in the Lokep Ward of the Siassi Rural LLG local government area of the Morobe Province of Papua New Guinea (PNG). Although the island has suffered no recent volcanic eruptions, it is in an area that suffers from frequent earthquakes.

== History ==
The earliest known sighting of the island by outsiders was by William Dampier, an English explorer, privateer, navigator, and naturalist. He sailed past Long Island and Tolikawa Island in 1700 and drew profiles in his log book.

== Description ==
Tolokiwa Island is situated 75 km north of the New Guinea mainland. The island has a diameter of 7 km and an area of 46 km^{2}. Its highest point in the Sulany peak at 1372 metres. The island was built up by a series of volcanic eruptions during the Pleistocene epoch. The well-vegetated island is an important natural site for birds, and is home to several species of resident birds (which it unusually shares with nearby islands). However, these may not be birds indigenous to the island as it is believed that wildlife would have been wiped out by a volcanic eruption on Long Island in the mid 17th-century. Tolokiwa is also home to a subspecies of Turdus Poliocephalus, the Tasman Sea island thrush.

The island sustained damage during the 13 March 1888 eruption of nearby Ritter Island, which caused a tsunami to hit Tolokiwa and other islands as well as the north coast of New Guinea.
