= Scouting and Guiding in Papua New Guinea =

Scouting and Guiding associations in Papua New Guinea

The Scout and Guide movement in Papua New Guinea is served by

- Girl Guides Association of Papua New Guinea, member of the World Association of Girl Guides and Girl Scouts
- The Scout Association of Papua New Guinea, is a member of the World Organization of the Scout Movement. It was founded in 1975 by an act of the PNG Office of Legislative Counsel. Scouting in PNG had previously operated as an off-shoot of first the British Empire Scouts (1926-1958), and then the Australian Scouts (1958-1975).
