= Charles Raymond Gurney =

Australian aviator

Charles Raymond "Bob" Gurney AFC
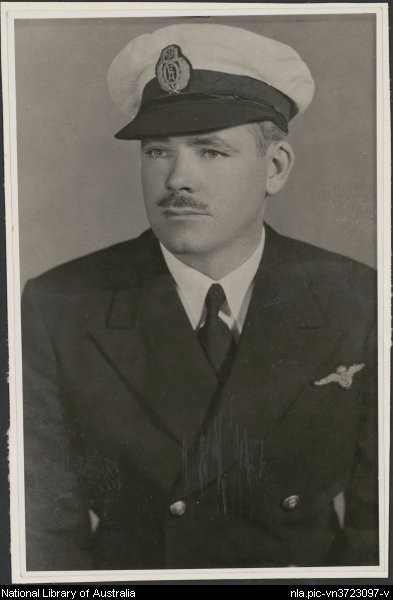
- Gurney c. 1930
- Born: 22 May 1906; Corowa, New South Wales, Australia
- Died: 2 May 1942 (aged 35); Okayaula, Kiriwina, Trobriand Islands, Papua New Guinea
- Cause of death: Killed in action
- Resting place: Port Moresby (Bomana) War Cemetery
- Occupation: Aviator
- Awards: Air Force Cross
- Aviation career
- Air force: Royal Australian Air Force
- Battles: Second World War
- Rank: Squadron leader

Charles Raymond (Bob) Gurney, AFC (22 May 1906 – 2 May 1942) was an Australian aviator who was involved in pioneering aviation in New Guinea in the 1930s. He flew with Qantas before and during the Second World War, and served with the Royal Australian Air Force (RAAF) from September 1939. He was killed on operations against the Japanese in the south west Pacific in 1942 flying alongside the United States Army Air Forces.

In his aviation career "Bob" Gurney was chief pilot of Guinea Airways, a Qantas flying boat captain and a squadron leader in the RAAF, who even had to bomb his own home. In commemoration of his service an airport in Papua New Guinea and a street in Townsville, Queensland are named after him.

== Early life ==
Charles Raymond Gurney (known as "Bob") was born in Corowa, New South Wales on 22 May 1906 to Raymond Gillies and Ida Winifred Sapphire (née Badham). His father died in 1912, so he was brought up as a Gurney after his mother married William Butler Gurney in 1914. His family moved to Sydney and on 14 December 1925 he joined the RAAF, learning to fly at Point Cook, Victoria under the instruction of Alan Cross. He joined No. 3 Squadron as a Pilot Officer in April 1926 on the reserve list. To get his hours up for a commercial pilot's licence, he barnstormed around the country and flew RAAF Westland Wapitis from Richmond. In 1929 he was approached by Alan Cross, then Guinea Airways manager, and asked to go to New Guinea. The next year, he married Margaret Josephine Mortimer (known as Jo) in North Sydney.

== Guinea Airways: 1929–1936 ==
Bob joined Guinea Airways in 1929, but retained his reserve status in the Citizen Air Force. During the 1920s the Morobe Goldfield in the Mandated Territory of New Guinea were being developed. The only routes to the goldfields was by foot from Salamaua on the coast or by aeroplane from Lae (about 20 miles across the Huon Gulf from Salamaua) to the airstrip at Wau, which was first used in 1927. When Bob started with Guinea Airways in November 1929 he arrived with two other pilots to join the three already flying the two Junkers W 34s and two de Havilland Moths. At the beginning of 1931 the first Junkers G 31 was flown, having arrived at Lae by ship. Guinea Airways owned one G 31 (VH-UOW) and operated two for Bulolo Gold Dredging Ltd. (VH-UOU and VH-UOV); a third was added in 1934 (VH-URQ). Guinea Airways was flying in the equipment needed for gold dredging and at this time was carrying more freight than the rest of the world combined. By this time, Bob Gurney was Chief Pilot for Guinea Airways.

Among the more unusual pieces of freight that Bob transported was a Baby Austin car belonging to Dr. Ian Dickson from Lae Airfield to Wau Aerodrome in 1933 (in the Junkers G 31 VH-UOW). The next year, in the same plane, he flew a 7,500 lb stator for Baiune power house to Bulolo Airfield, with the centre of gravity about 3’ 6" above the wings, and landing with only ten minutes of fuel left. At the time, this was considered to be "probably the heaviest and most awkward single piece load yet carried by aeroplane".

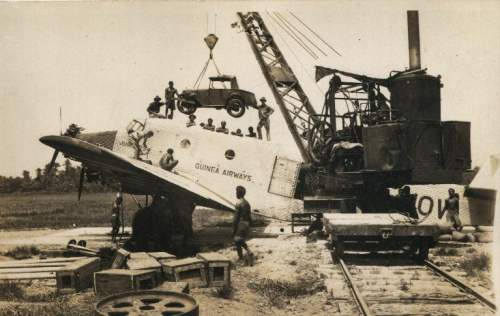
Loading the Austin 7 at Lae

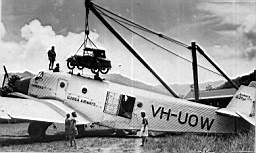
Unloading the Austin 7 at Wau

Bob not only flew large amounts of freight, but was also involved in the exploration of the interior of Papua and New Guinea doing aerial surveys and supply runs for the Leahy brothers, Ivan Champion, Jack Hides and Jim Taylor. In the early days of air mail, Bob often signed envelopes as the delivering pilot, particularly when carried to or from remote locations such as Wahgi River, Mount Hagen & Salamaua (all in 1933), and Port Moresby and Bena Bena (in 1934). The first two pieces of air mail from Mogai Aerodrome (near Mount Hagen gold fields) were signed and dated by Bob Gurney (2 April 1934), who piloted the very first plane into the aerodrome on the previous day. Some of these envelopes are now considered to be collector's items due to their rarity.

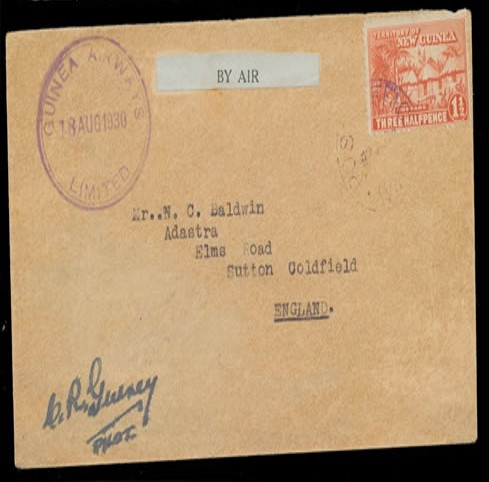
Guinea Airways cover to England, signed "CR Gurney/Pilot" (18 Aug 1930)

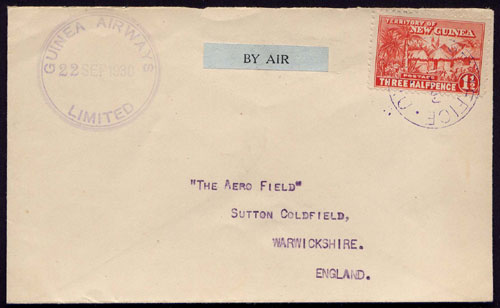
Wau-Rabaul cover flown by Gurney & Wiltshire for Guinea Airways, addressed to England (22 Sep 1930)

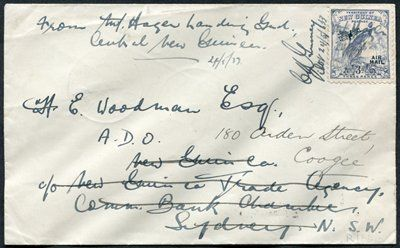
First Flight Cover from Mount Hagen to Salamaua endorsed "From Mt Hagen Landing Gnd Central New Guinea" and signed "CR Gurney Pilot 24/5/33" (24 May 1933)

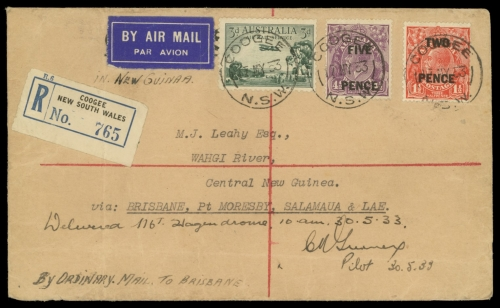
Registered air mail cover from NSW to Wahgi River endorsed "Delivered Mt Hagen drome 10am 30.5.33/CRGurney/Pilot" (30 May 1933)

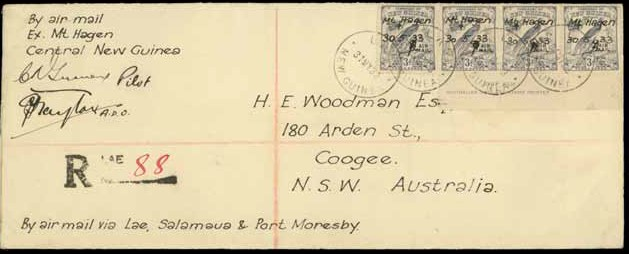
Air mail cover from the return flight from Mount Hagen, signed at upper left "CRGurney Pilot" (30 May 1933)

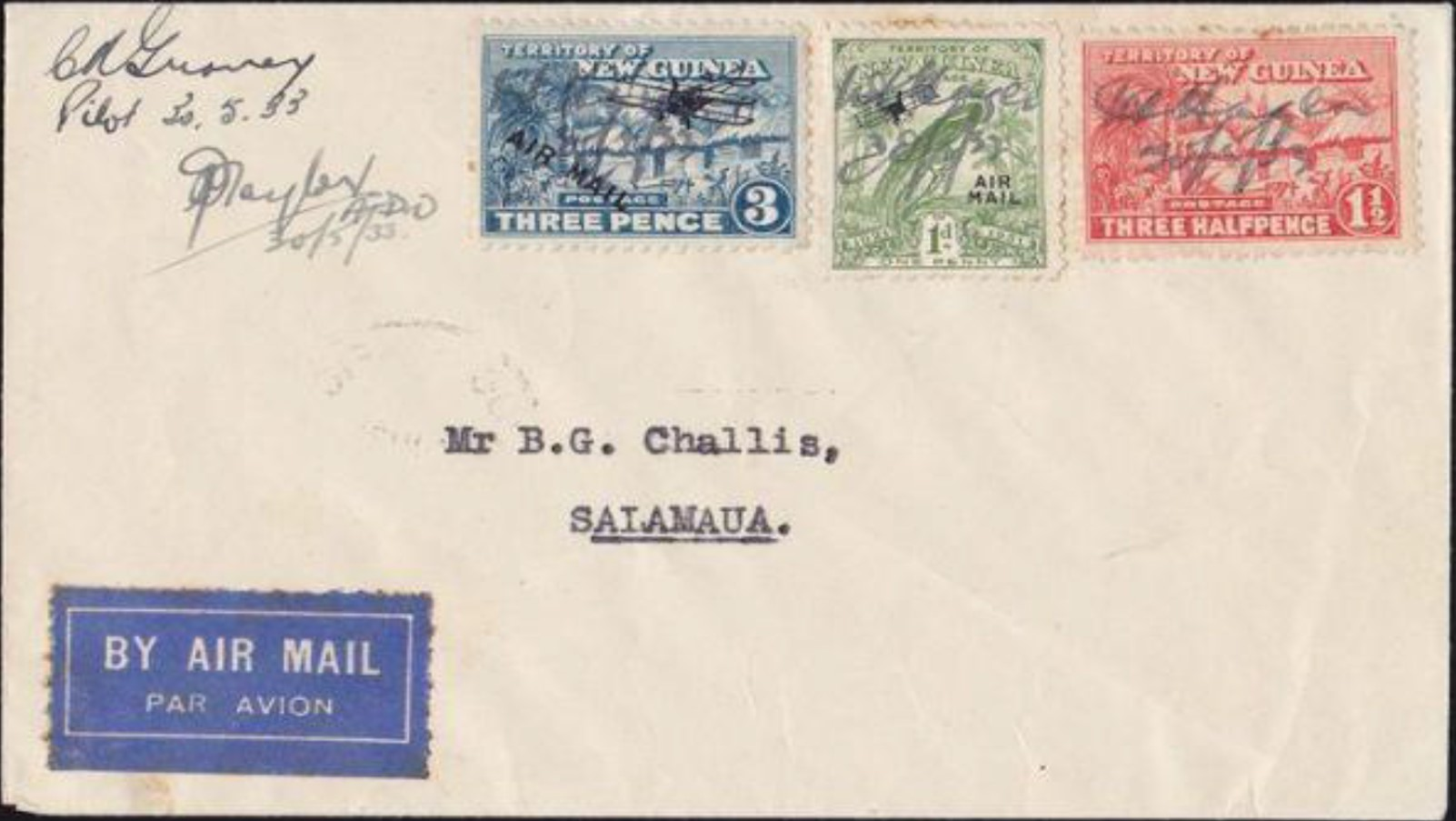
Air mail cover from Mount Hagen to Salamaua with "CR Gurney Pilot" dated signature (30 May 1933)

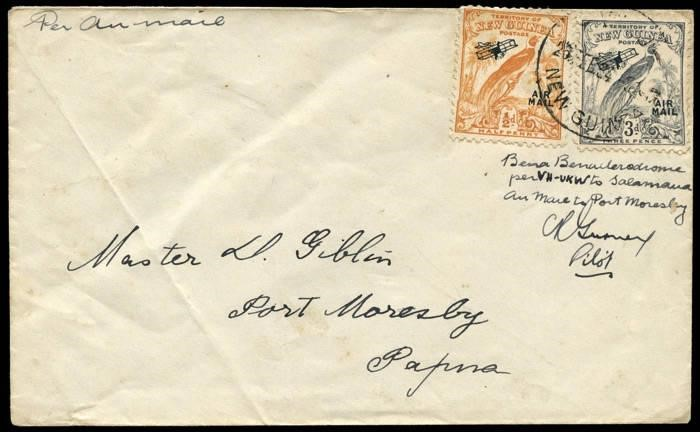
Bena Bena-Salamaua-Port Moresby cover flown signed & endorsed by C R Bob Gurney in a Junkers F13 for Guinea Airways (25 Feb 1934)

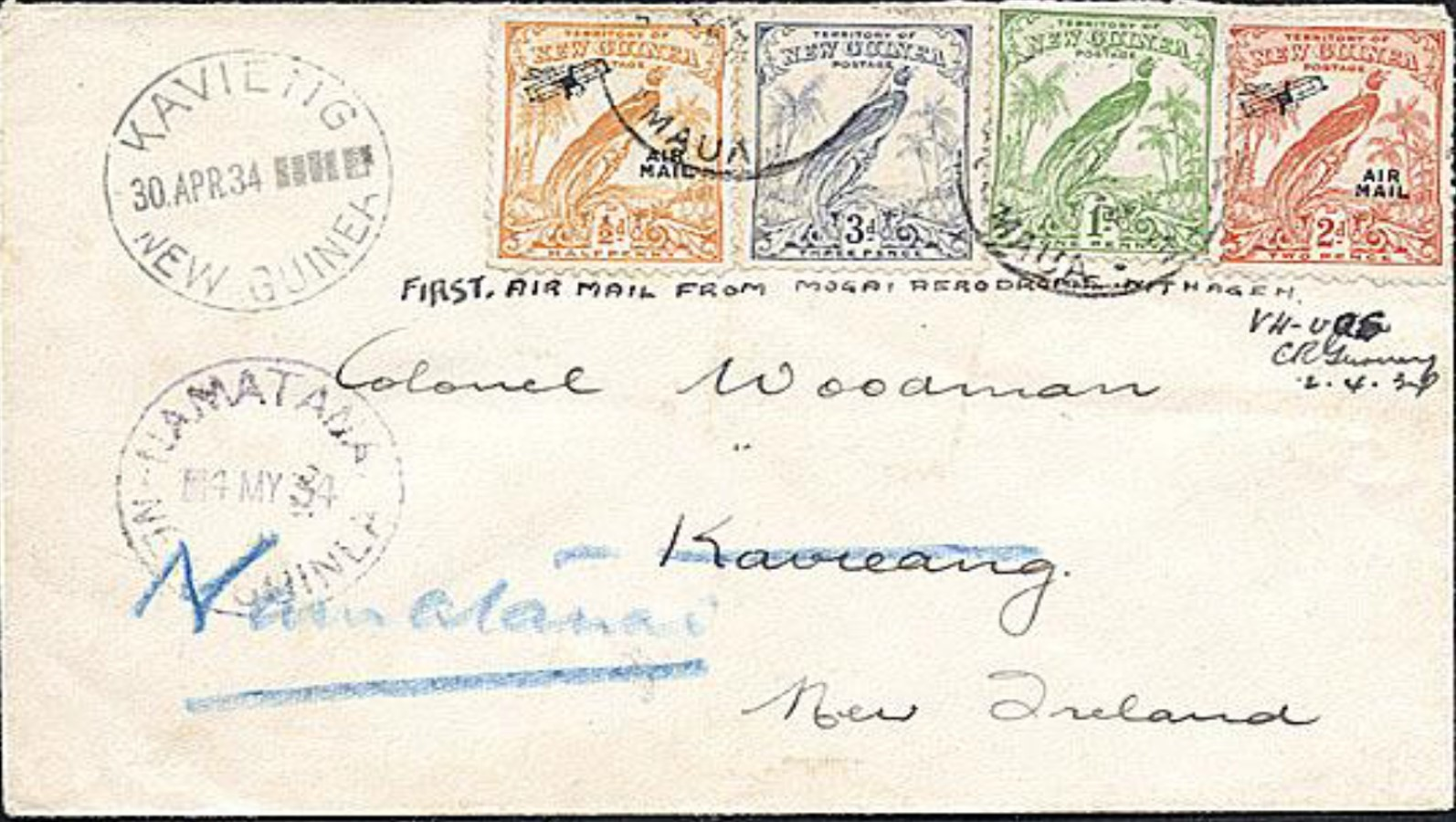
Air mail cover flown from Mogai Aerodrome (near Mount Hagen gold fields) to Salamaua. Endorsed, signed and dated by Bob Gurney, who had made the first landing at Mogai the previous day for Guinea Airways (2 Apr 1934)

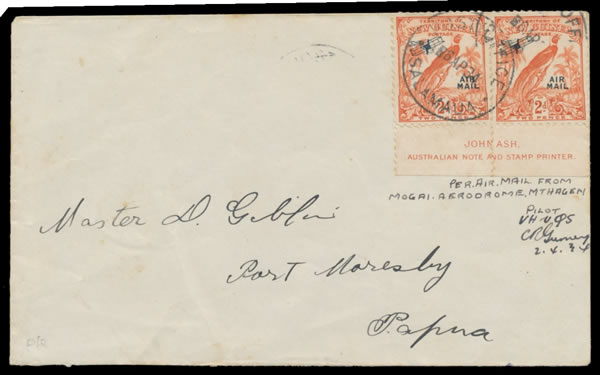
Mogai-Salamaua-Port Moresby endorsed "from Mogai Aerodrome Mt Hagen" & signed "CR Gurney/Pilot" (2 Apr 1934)

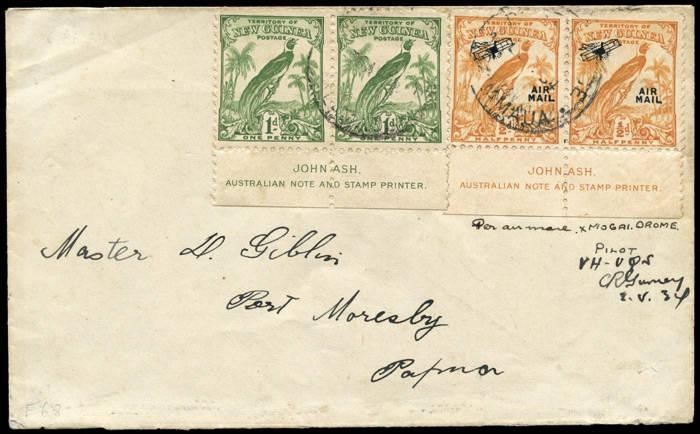
Mogai-Salamaua-Port Moresby cover flown signed & endorsed by C R Bob Gurney in a DH Fox Moth for Guinea Airways (2 May 1934)

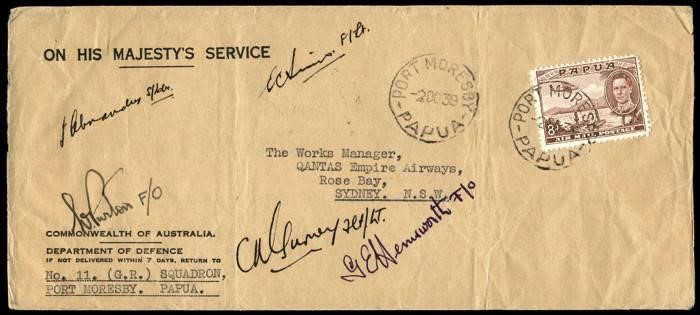
Port Moresby-Sydney OHMS cover, No. 11 Squadron Port Moresby flown and signed by the crew including Bob Gurney, Eric Sims, Gogh Hemsworth, Bill Purton and others (1939)

== Qantas: 1936–1939 ==
In June 1936, Bob Gurney left Guinea Airways and joined Qantas (at that stage, known as Qantas Empire Airways) as a captain flying de Havilland D.H.86s on the Brisbane-Singapore route. Three other colleagues from Guinea Airways also moved to Qantas around the same time: Orm Denny (April 1936), Aubrey Koch (July 1938), and Godfrey "Goff" Hemsworth. The flying boats were based in Rose Bay, Sydney and carried about 12 passengers, with the steward in a white shirt with black tie; to travel in such boats was the height of luxury. They only flew during the daytime and landed at places like Karumba, Townsville and Brisbane

In April 1937, Gurney and two other Qantas Captains (Bill Crowther and Lester Brain) flew from Brisbane to England to receive training in the handling of the new Short Empire flying boats Qantas had purchased. Qantas operated the Sydney-Singapore sector of the Australia-England Empire route, and Imperial Airways the Singapore-England sector. The journey from Sydney to Southampton took 9½ days. On 22 December 1938, Gurney and Denny piloted the Cordelia in the first Qantas Empire Airways flying boat flight from Darwin to Brisbane (1940 miles) in one day.

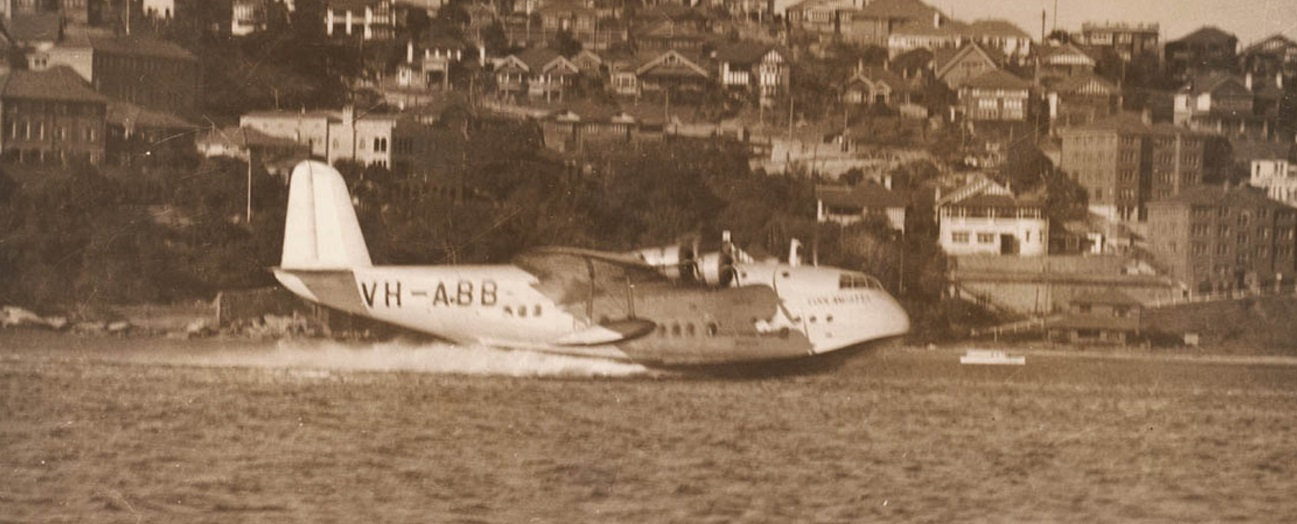

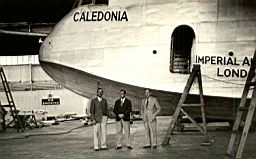
Bob Gurney (R) with Lester Brain and Bill Crowther in England, training on Empire Flying Boats

== RAAF: 1939–1942 ==
At the outbreak of the Second World War, the Australian Government requisitioned two C-class Empire flying boats from Qantas (‘’Centaurus’’ and ‘’Calypso’’), along with their crews, to form No. 11 Squadron RAAF, initially at RAAF Base Richmond, but quickly moved to Port Moresby in Papua New Guinea. The boats were converted for war use in 5 days and on 25 September 1939 left for active service operations in the north of Australia. Bob Gurney was one of the pilots and of the 4 officers in the contingent, 3 died in the first six months of the war in the Pacific. Captains Bob Gurney & Eric Sims and First Officers Bill Purton & Godfrey Hemsworth, some of whom had been on the RAAF Reserve, transferred to full-time RAAF duty along with other Qantas staff. Gurney and Hemsworth in particular were selected for transfer to the RAAF due to their detailed knowledge of Papua New Guinea. They were later joined by Mike Mather.

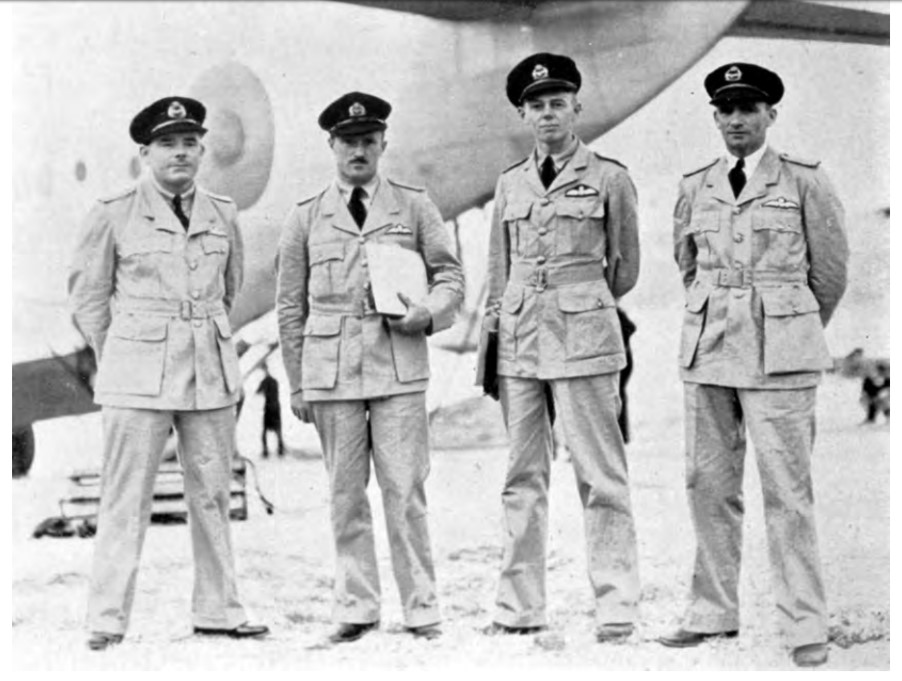
Original members of the first RAAF Empire flying-boat squadron (Gurney is on the left)

The squadron undertook seaward reconnaissance in defence of trade routes and Australian shipping, shadowing Japanese shipping, with Bob carrying out many maritime surveillance missions to New Britain, the Solomon Islands and the New Hebrides. At this stage, Gurney was a Flight Lieutenant, but was promoted to Squadron Leader in January 1941, and was made temporary Commanding Officer of the squadron. At some point around this time, the squadron was re-equipped with PBY Catalina flying boats.

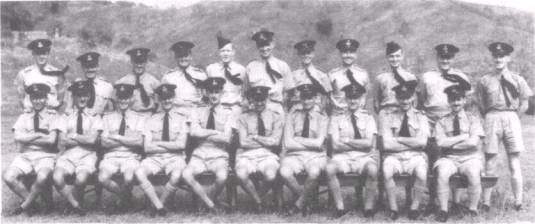
Officers of RAAF No 11 Squadron, Port Moresby, early 1941 (Bob Gurney is second from the left in the back row)

On 18 April 1941, Gurney piloted the first direct flight from Sydney to Nouméa, New Caledonia, in a PBY Catalina from No. 11 Squadron, signing a commemorative envelope to mark the occasion.

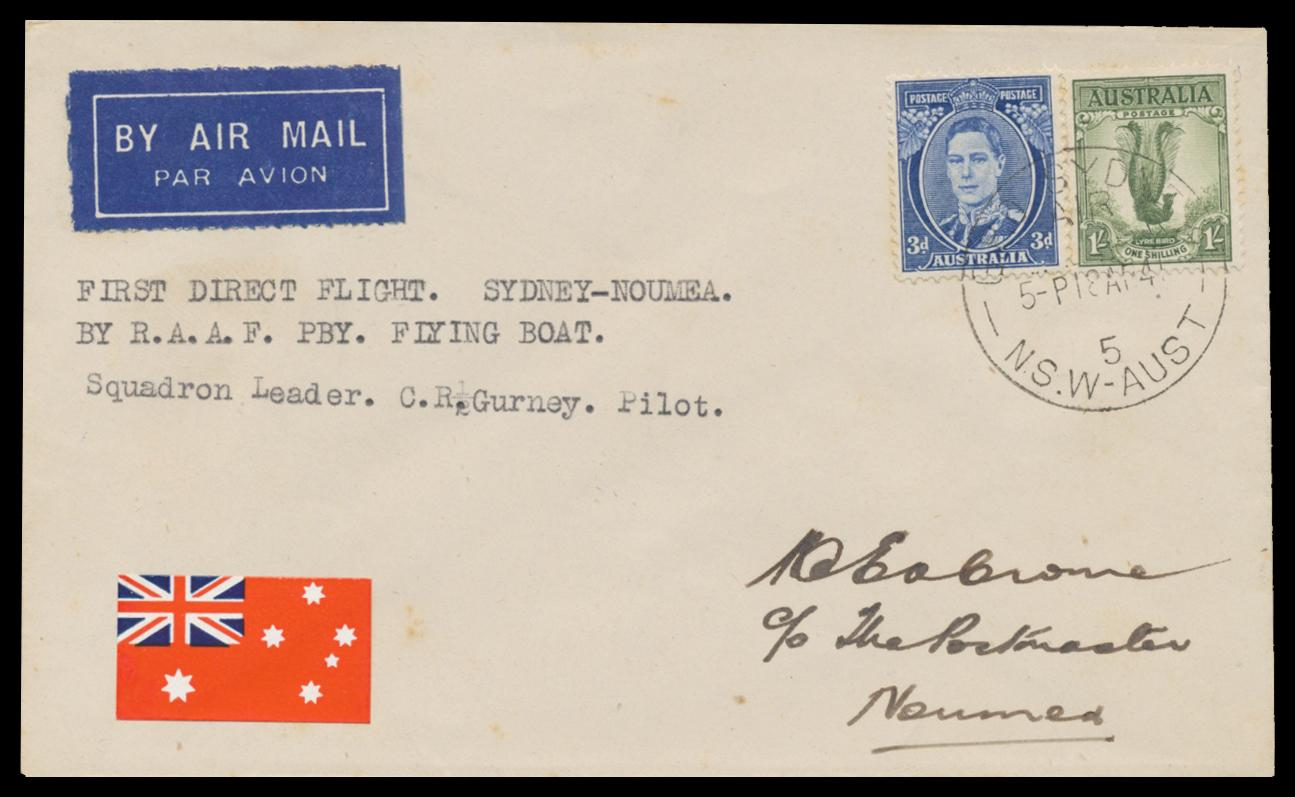
Envelope commemorating first direct flight from Sydney to Nouméa, signed by C R Gurney

Owing to British war commitments, in October 1941 Qantas took over responsibility for the Singapore-Karachi sector of the Empire route. Due to civilian crew shortages, Bob Gurney, Bill Purton and Eric Sims were seconded from the RAAF to operate the flying boats with Qantas. The outbreak of war in the Pacific necessitated frequent re-evaluation of the routes flown and Bob was involved in the Batavia-Singapore shuttles and the Broome-Tjilatjap shuttles. On 19 February 1942 Gurney was in Darwin with other Qantas crews when the first Japanese air attack on Australia occurred; he was sheltering near the Darwin Hotel when the post office was destroyed. Gurney was recalled to active service in March 1942 and was made commanding officer of No. 33 Squadron based at Townsville on 8 March 1942. Japanese forces invaded Papua New Guinea, and chose to place part of their headquarters in the house that had previously been Gurney's home in Lae. When a bombing raid on Lae was launched by the 435th Bombardment Squadron (also based at Townsville) on 10 March 1942, Gurney insisted on taking part:

“urging that he not only knew the place better than anyone else on the station, but could claim a prior right in smashing up his own home. He went, and from the aircraft he flew was launched the bomb that blew his own house to smithereens.”

In February 1942 the 22nd Bombardment Group USAAF, equipped with Martin B-26 Marauders, left the United States and made its base at Townsville. On 5 April 1942 the 22nd launched its first combat strike against Rabaul in New Britain (north of New Guinea). Bob's intimate knowledge of the flying conditions and geography around New Guinea made him a natural choice to fly with the Americans.

== Final flight ==
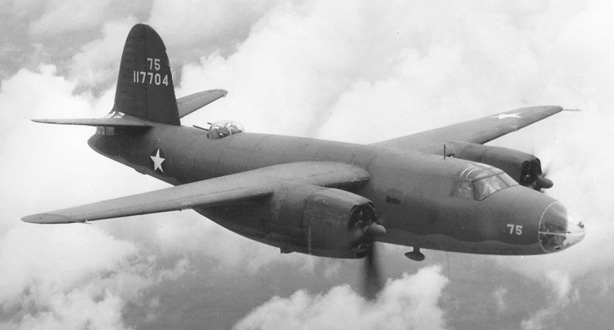
B-26 Marauder

On 2 May 1942, Gurney was co-pilot in Martin B-26 Marauder no. 40–1426, with Christian "Chris" Herron as the USAAF pilot. They took off, with a crew of seven, from Kila Kila Airfield near Port Moresby, New Guinea, on a bombing mission against Simpson Harbour off Rabaul, New Britain in this particular aircraft's first combat mission. Somehow, on the way to Rabaul, their aircraft became separated from the rest of the raid, so when they arrived over Simpson Harbour late, they were on their own and the Japanese were ready for them. Nonetheless, they pressed on with the mission alone. Over the target, one engine was hit by anti-aircraft fire, so they departed the area on only one engine, gradually losing altitude. Herron took refuge in a brewing storm, but struggled to stay airborne. The crew was instructed to jettison anything they could to bring stability to the aircraft. They then managed to fly almost three hundred miles towards friendly territory. As they approached the Trobriand Islands, Herron knew that they would not make it to a landing strip, and that he should let friendly forces know of their location and need to attempt an emergency landing. Gurney knew that enemy forces would be listening to such broadcasts, so suggested the message: "Making a forced landing where Francine used to live." The staff at Port Moresby knew, along with Gurney, that a woman named Francine had previously lived on Kiriwina Island, the largest in the Trobriands, so were able to send a rescue mission to the right area.

Prior to attempting an emergency landing, the crew was advised to bail out; when they refused, they were told to secure themselves in the rear of the aircraft. The five crewmen wedged themselves tightly together with cushions in the rear compartment, with Herron and Gurney remaining in the cockpit.

Instead of the normal emergency procedure of a belly landing, pilot Herron attempted a conventional wheels-down landing on a patch of flat terrain that "looked like a meadow" on the southern end of the island. Whilst he was successful in executing the three-point landing, the appearance of flat, solid ground on Kiriwina turned out to be deceptive; it was actually a bog. The nose wheel ploughed into the marsh, the front strut ripped loose, and the Plexiglas nose of the Marauder buried itself in the muck, causing the bomber to flip over onto its back.

The five crewmen emerged from a hatch in the bomber's belly, shaken but unhurt apart from a bruised shoulder. Herron called from the upside-down cockpit to check that the crew had survived. Having waded waist-deep through the swamp, the crew found Gurney already dead, and Herron trapped in the cockpit filling with water as it sank into the mud. Despite their efforts, Herron drowned before they could pull him free from the wreckage. They said a prayer and covered the cockpit with Herron's parachute.

Sure enough, the rescue party in a Catalina had received Gurney's message regarding their landing location. They landed on the water near Samarai, and were told by an Australian Soldier on board a Lakatoi that Francine was the daughter of a French Missionary who had lived on Kiriwina. They headed off to the island to find the five survivors on 3 May, with confirmation that both Gurney and Herron were dead. The crew were transported to Port Moresby and returned to duty.

== Legacy ==
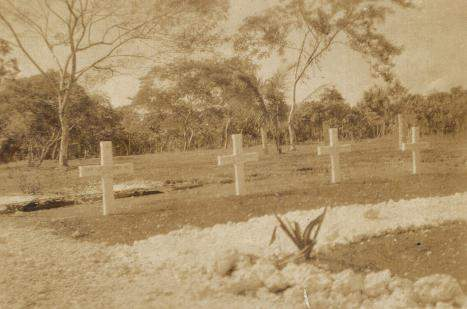
Gurney's grave (on the left) is marked with a wooden cross before permanent headstones were installed

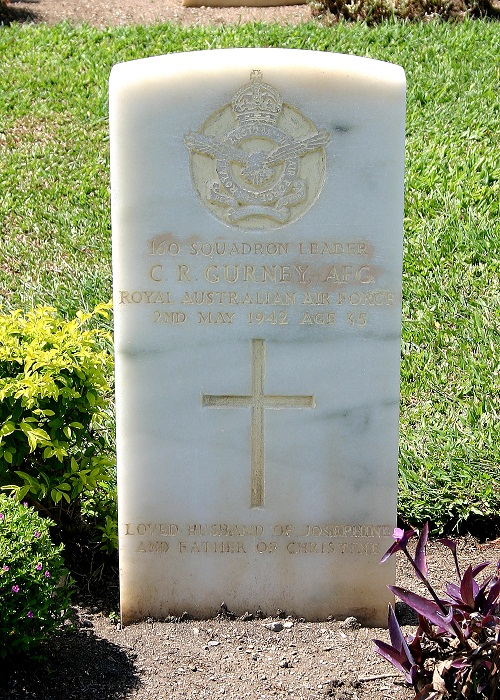
Headstone on Gurney's grave at Bomana War Cemetery in Port Moresby

Gurney's skeleton was finally removed from the plane on 16 August 1943, close to Okayaula Village. It was temporarily buried in grave no. 1A of the Allied Section at USAF Cemetery #1 on Kiriwina Island (in Milne Bay) at 2pm on 18 August 1943. Gurney was later reinterred in grave A3.D.14 of the Port Moresby Bomana War Cemetery.

On 11 June 1942, in the King's Birthday Honours, Gurney was posthumously awarded the Air Force Cross for "outstanding ability on seaward reconnaissances".

On 14 September 1942, No. 1 Strip (Fall River) at Milne Bay was officially renamed "Gurney Field" in his honour. This airfield has since become Gurney Airport.

Gurney Street in Townsville, Australia, adjacent to RAAF Townsville where Gurney was based as CO of 33 Squadron, is named after him.
