= Alotau =

- Town
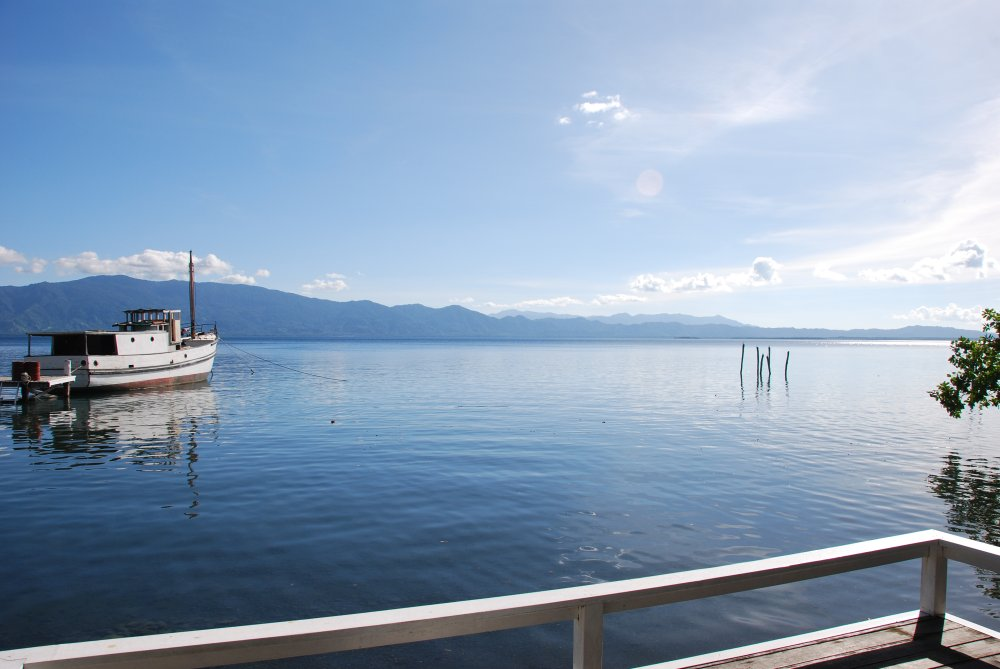
- Milne Bay, Alotau

- Location within Papua New Guinea
- Coordinates: 10°19′S 150°26′E
- Country: Papua New Guinea
- Province: Milne Bay Province
- District: Alotau District
- LLG: Alotau Urban LLG
- Elevation: 6 m (20 ft)

Population (2024)
  - Total: 149,806
  - Rank: 10th

Languages
  - Main languages: Tawala, English, Suau,
- Time zone: UTC+10:00 (PGT)
- Postcode: 211
- Location: 365 km (227 mi) ESE of Port Moresby
- Annual rainfall: 3,108 mm (122.4 in)
- Climate: Af

Alotau is the capital of Milne Bay Province, in the far south-east of Papua New Guinea, on the tip of the Papuan Peninsula. It is located on the northern shore of Milne Bay and the township is conveniently situated within the Alotau Urban LLG.

Its Cathedral of the Sacred Heart of Jesus is the episcopal see of the Roman Catholic Diocese of Alotau–Sideia.

The town is located within the area in which the invading Japanese army suffered their first land defeat in the Pacific War in 1942, before the Kokoda Track battle. A memorial park at the old battle site commemorates the event. Alotau became the provincial capital in 1969, when it was shifted from Samarai.

== Transport ==
There is a road from Ulumani to Alotau which passes the local Gurney Airport, named after squadron leader Charles Raymond Gurney of the Royal Australian Air Force, who was killed in the area in 1942. The airport is located 12 km from the town.

Alotau is the gateway to the Milne Bay Province, which contains some of the most remote island communities in the world. Milne Bay is noted for its coral reef and scuba diving experiences.

== Climate ==
Alotau has a tropical rainforest climate (Köppen Af) with heavy rainfall year-round.

Climate data for Alotau
Month	Jan	Feb	Mar	Apr	May	Jun	Jul	Aug	Sep	Oct	Nov	Dec	Year
Mean daily maximum °C (°F)	31.2 (88.2)	31.5 (88.7)	30.9 (87.6)	30.1 (86.2)	29.3 (84.7)	28.5 (83.3)	28.0 (82.4)	28.2 (82.8)	28.8 (83.8)	29.5 (85.1)	30.4 (86.7)	31.0 (87.8)	29.8 (85.6)
Daily mean °C (°F)	27.5 (81.5)	27.6 (81.7)	27.3 (81.1)	26.7 (80.1)	26.2 (79.2)	25.5 (77.9)	25.1 (77.2)	25.1 (77.2)	25.5 (77.9)	26.1 (79.0)	26.7 (80.1)	27.2 (81.0)	26.4 (79.5)
Mean daily minimum °C (°F)	23.8 (74.8)	23.8 (74.8)	23.8 (74.8)	23.3 (73.9)	23.2 (73.8)	22.6 (72.7)	22.2 (72.0)	22.1 (71.8)	22.3 (72.1)	22.8 (73.0)	23.1 (73.6)	23.5 (74.3)	23.0 (73.5)
Average rainfall mm (inches)	163 (6.4)	179 (7.0)	186 (7.3)	285 (11.2)	369 (14.5)	341 (13.4)	308 (12.1)	291 (11.5)	346 (13.6)	282 (11.1)	164 (6.5)	141 (5.6)	3,055 (120.2)
