= Adzera language =

Oceanic language spoken in Papua New Guinea

Adzera
- Region: Morobe Province, Papua New Guinea
- Native speakers: (ca. 30,000 cited 2000 census)
- Language family: Austronesian: Malayo-Polynesian; Oceanic; Western Oceanic; North New Guinea ?; Ngero–Vitiaz ?; Huon Gulf; Markham; Upper; Adzera
- Writing system: Latin

Language codes
- ISO 639-3: Variously: adz – Adzera zsu – Sukurum zsa – Sarasira
- Glottolog: adze1240 Adzera suku1264 Sukurum sara1323 Sarasira
- ELP: Adzera

Adzera (also spelled Atzera, Azera, Atsera, Acira) is an Austronesian language spoken by about 30,000 people in Morobe Province, Papua New Guinea.

== Dialects ==
Holzknecht (1989) lists six Adzera dialects.

- Central dialect chain: 9,950 speakers
- Amari dialect: 5,350 speakers
- Ngarowapum dialect: 1,200 speakers
- Yaros dialect: 2,200 speakers
- Guruf / Ngariawang dialect: 1,550 speakers
- Tsumanggorun dialect: 400 speakers

Sukurum is spoken in the villages of Sukurum (6.27629°S 146.476694°E), Rumrinan (6.277752°S 146.476623°E), Gabagiap (6.289357°S 146.465999°E), Gupasa, Waroum (6.287214°S 146.453831°E), and Wangat (6.35307°S 146.418517°E) in Wantoat/Leron Rural LLG.

Sarasira is spoken in the villages of Sarasira (6.320957°S 146.48297°E), Som (6.323791°S 146.507495°E), Pukpuk, Saseang (6.418768°S 146.416931°E), and Sisuk in Wantoat/Leron Rural LLG. Sarasira and Som share the same speech variety.

== Phonology ==
=== Vowels ===
Vowels
| | Front | Back |
|---|---|---|
| High | i | u |
| Mid | | (o) |
| Low | a | |

Howard (2010) transcribes the open (low) central vowel with /ɑ/ instead of /a/.

Holzknecht (1989) notes that a contrast between /o/ and /u/ is absent in the Amari and Ngarowapum dialects, while Howard (2010) suggests that this is the case universally, with [o] as an allophone of /u/.

According to Holzknecht (1986), the diphthongs /ai, au/ may occur, while other vowel sequences with /i, u/ have a corresponding glide of the first vowel (/j/ for /i/ and /w/ for /u/) inserted between:

- /ia/ > [ija]
- /iu/ > [iju]
- /ui/ > [uwi]
- /ua/ > [uwa]

Howard (2010) corroborates the diphthongs, but instead suggests that the sequences are split across syllable boundaries:

- /ia/ > [i.a]
- /iu/ > [i.u]
- /ui/ > [u.i]
- /ua/ > [u.a]

=== Consonants ===
Consonants
| | | Labial | Alveolar | Palatal | Velar | Glottal |
|---|---|---|---|---|---|---|
| Nasal | | m | n | | ŋ | |
| Stop | voiceless | p | t | tʃ | k | ʔ |
| Stop | prenasal vl. | ᵐp | ⁿt | ⁿtʃ | ᵑk | ᵑʔ |
| Stop | voiced | b | d | dʒ | ɡ | |
| Stop | prenasal vd. | | | ⁿdʒ | | |
| Fricative | | f | s | | | h |
| Approximant | | w | | j | | |
| Rhotic | | | r ~ ɾ | | | |

/h/ occurs in only one word: the interjection hai "yes".

In the Amari dialect, palato-alveolar affricates /tʃ, ⁿtʃ/ and /dʒ, ⁿdʒ/ are heard as only alveolar sounds [ts, ⁿts] and [dz, ⁿdz].

The prenasalized consonants tend to lose prenasalization initially and after consonants.

/tʃ ⁿtʃ/ are sometimes realized as [ts ⁿts], especially in syllable-final position.

== Writing system ==
| A a | B b | D d | Dz dz | F f | G g | H h | I i | K k | M m | Mp mp | N n | Ndz ndz | Nt nt |
|---|---|---|---|---|---|---|---|---|---|---|---|---|---|
| ɑ | b | d | dʒ | f | ɡ | h | i | k | m | ᵐp | n | ⁿdʒ | ⁿt |
| Nts nts | Ŋ ŋ | Ŋk ŋk | Ŋʼ ŋʼ | P p | R r | S s | T t | Ts ts | U u | W w | Y y | ʼ | |
| ⁿtʃ | ŋ | ᵑk | ᵑʔ | p | r | s | t | tʃ | u | w | j | ʔ | |

J, o and z are used in some loanwords and names.

The letter ⟨ŋ⟩ was replaced by the digraph ⟨ng⟩ in the 2015 orthography.

== Grammar ==
=== Negation ===
==== Simple negation ====
Simple negation in Adzera is achieved by the word imaʔ 'no'. This word can be used on its own in response to a question, or paired with a negative sentence. For example:

Imaʔ Dzi i- bugin biskit
NEG 1SG REAL not.like biscuit
No, I do not like biscuits.

The Amari dialect of Adzera is specifically noted for its use of namu for 'no' where all other Adzera dialects would use imaʔ. however, in Amari both words can be used interchangeably.

==== Negation of a noun phrase ====
The simple negative forms above can be used in a noun phrase after the noun to modify it. Such as mamaʔ namu 'No children'. This can also apply to a coordinated noun phrase, such as iyam da ifab 'dog and pig' where iyam da ifab namu would mean that there were no dogs and no pigs.

==== Negation of a verb phrase ====
Most negation is done through the verb phrase. For general circumstances, verbal negation is achieved by a verbal prefix anuŋʔ- And an optional negation particle u at the end of the sentence. For example:

dzi anuŋʔ- i- saŋʔ rim -a u sib u
1SG NEG REAL be.enough help PTCP 2SG COMP NEG
I am not able to help you.

However, for verbs in the imperative or hortative forms, which take a prefix wa- or na- respectively, the negative is achieved by replacing their respective prefixes with a negative form ma- followed at the end of the sentence by a compulsory particle maʔ.

ma- fan maʔ
IMP.NEG go IMP.NEG
Do not go!

===== Coordinated verb negation =====
When two negative verbs or phrases are joined by da ‘and’ the first verb takes the negative prefix anuŋʔ-, and the negative particle u comes at the end of the whole sentence.

{muŋʔ ugu} da sagat anuŋʔ- i- ga was da i- is pauʔ u
a.long.time.ago TIME woman NEG REAL eat lime and REAL hit tobacco NEG
A long time ago, women neither chewed betel nut nor smoked tobacco.

===== Negation with future tense =====
When negating a sentence in the future tense, the future tense prefix is replaced with the realis prefix. Any future time marking still remains. There is also a preference toward forming negative sentences in the future tense with an auxiliary verb saŋʔ 'be able, be enough' before the main verb of the sentence, suggesting a reluctance toward making negative statements about the future. For example:

tataʔ da u anuŋʔ- i- saŋʔ fa -da taun u
tomorrow TIME 2SG NEG REAL be.enough go PTCP town NEG
Tomorrow you will not be able to go to town.

When coordinating two sentences of future tense, the first verb phrase replaces the future prefix with the realis, but all following verb phrases retain their future tense marking.

== List of abbreviations ==
see List of Glossing Abbreviations.

Below is a list of Grammatical abbreviations used throughout this article:

Grammatical Abbreviations
| NEG | Negative |
| 1SG | 1st Person Singular |
| REAL | Realis |
| PTCP | Participle |
| 2SG | 2nd Person Singular |
| COMP | Completive |
| IMP | Imperative |
