= Misima Island Airport =

Airport in Milne Bay, Papua New Guinea

Misima Airport
- IATA: MIS; ICAO: AYMS

Summary
- Airport type: Public
- Operator: Government
- Serves: Misima Island, Milne Bay Province, Papua New Guinea
- Elevation AMSL: 27 m (89 ft)
- Coordinates: 10°41′21″S 152°50′17″E

Map
- Location of the airport in Papua New Guinea

Runways
Direction	Length		Surface
Direction	m	ft	Surface
09/27	1,690	5,545	Dirt
- Source: WAD, GCM

Misima Airport (IATA: MIS, ICAO: AYMS) is an airport serving the Misima Island, in the Milne Bay Province of Papua New Guinea.

== Airlines and destinations ==
PNG Air connects Misima Island Airport to Gurney Airport (Alotau).
