= Wagang =

- Village
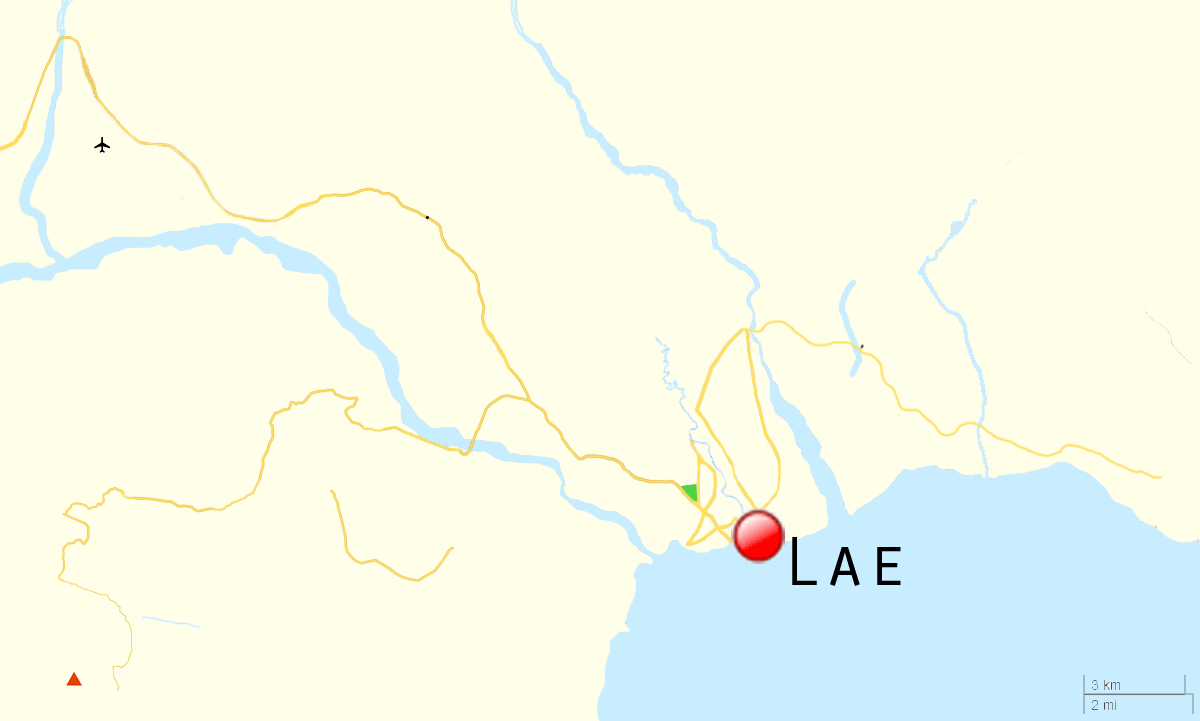
- Location in the Lae area
- Coordinates: 6°41′S 147°6′E
- Country: Papua New Guinea
- Province: Morobe Province
- District: Lae District
- LLG: Burum-Kwat Rural LLG
- Time zone: UTC+10 (AEST)

Wagang or Wagan is a village located to the east of Lae in Burum-Kwat Rural LLG, Morobe Province, Papua New Guinea.
