= Yabim-Mape Rural LLG =

Local-level government in Papua New Guinea

- Location within Papua New Guinea
- Coordinates: 6.59°S 147.69°E
- Country: Papua New Guinea
- Province: Morobe Province
- Time zone: UTC+10 (AEST)

Yabim-Mape Rural LLG is a local-level government (LLG) of Morobe Province, Papua New Guinea.

== Wards ==
- 01. Kamlawa
- 02. Simbang
- 03. Bugaim
- 04. Nasingalatu
- 05. Sokaneng
- 06. Kwalansam
- 07. Kasanga
- 08. Busiga
- 09. Wanam/Tami Island
- 10. Bukawasip
- 11. Tigidu
- 13. Samantiki
- 14. Mawaneng
- 15. Embewaneng
- 16. Mangao
- 17. Kangaruo
- 18. Haponhongdong
- 19. Buang
- 20. Gurungko
- 21. Yombong
- 22. Kolem
