= Wau-Waria District =

Papua New Guinean local government area

Wau Waria District
- Location within Papua New Guinea
- Coordinates: 7°20′20″S 146°43′00″E
- Country: Papua New Guinea
- Province: Morobe Province
- Capital: Wau

Government
  - MP: Marsh Narewec

Area
  - Total: 5,517 km^{2} (2,130 sq mi)

Population (2024 census)
  - Total: 100,622
  - Density: 18.24/km^{2} (47.24/sq mi)
- Time zone: UTC+10 (AEST)

Wau Waria is a district in Morobe Province, Papua New Guinea. It is one of the newest administrative districts in the province, having used to be a part of Bulolo District before breaking off to form its own district in the early 2020s.
