= Bulolo Airport =

Airport in Morobe, Papua New Guinea

- IATA: BUL; ICAO: AYBU

Summary
- Location: Bulolo, Papua New Guinea
- Elevation AMSL: 2,240 ft (680 m)
- Coordinates: 07°12′58″S 146°38′58″E

Maps
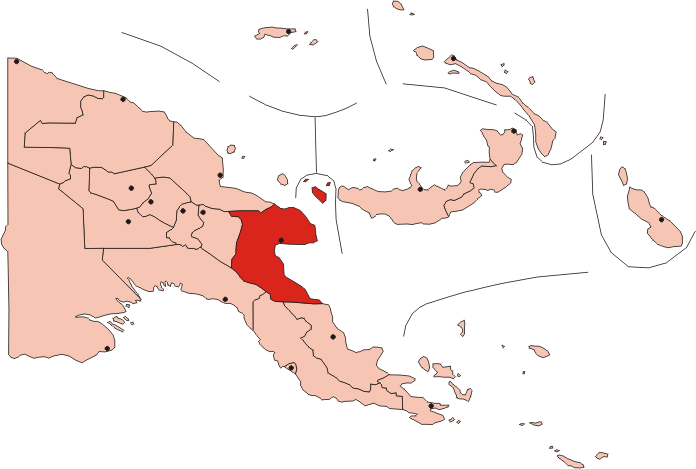
- Morobe Province of Papua New Guinea

- Location of the airport in Papua New Guinea

Runways
Direction	Length		Surface
Direction	m	ft	Surface
15L/33R	1,333	4,373
- Source: PNG Airstrip Guide

Bulolo Airport (IATA: BUL, ICAO: AYBU) is an airfield serving Bulolo, in the Morobe Province of Papua New Guinea.

== Airline and destination ==
PNG Air connects Bulolo Airport to Port Moresby International Airport.
