= Burum-Kwat Rural LLG =

Local-level government in Papua New Guinea

Burum-Kwat Rural LLG Burum-Kuat Rural LLG
- Country: Papua New Guinea
- Province: Morobe Province
- Time zone: UTC+10 (AEST)

Burum-Kwat Rural LLG (also spelled Burum-Kuat) is a local-level government (LLG) of Morobe Province, Papua New Guinea.

== Wards ==
- 01. Kotken
- 02. Zengaring
- 03. Numbut
- 04. Ubanong
- 05. Koire
- 06. Songolok
- 07. Nomaneneng
- 08. Sagiro
- 09. Ogeranang
- 10. Serembeng
- 11. Origenang
- 12. Manimbu
- 13. Wamoki
- 14. Ebabang
- 15. Hamoronong
- 16. Sangararang
- 17. Tumnong
- 18. Mindik
- 19. Satneng
- 20. Wagang
- 21. Tobou
- 22. Lengbatti
- 23. Awengu
- 24. Sasiu
