= Girl Guides Association of Papua New Guinea =

Guiding organisation in Papua New Guinea

- Country: Papua New Guinea
- Founded: 1927
- Membership: 1,890
- Affiliation: World Association of Girl Guides and Girl Scouts

The Girl Guides Association of Papua New Guinea is the Guiding organisation in Papua New Guinea. Founded in 1927, the girls-only organization became a full member of the World Association of Girl Guides and Girl Scouts in 1996. It has 1,890 members (as of 2017).

== History ==
The Association was founded in Hanuabada in 1927 by a missionary, making it one of the oldest youth organizations in the country. Groups spread to other village, and in 1933, the first Ranger company (for those aged 16 to 22) was started. Membership was 120 by 1939, but activities ceased from 1942 and 1945 due to World War II.

Activity resumed in 1946. The Association was considered a division of Girl Guides Australia at the time, as Papua New Guinea was controlled by Australia, but it became its own branch in 1955. It became fully independent in 1976, after Papua New Guinea's independence, and it gained associate membership with the World Association of Girl Guides and Girl Scouts in 1978. At that time, both the Girl Guides and the Boy Scouts of Papua New Guinea were criticized by Hironobu Shibuya, the director of the United Nations Information Centre in Papua New Guinea, for not including culturally relevant training. Enny Moaitz became involved with the Association in 1973 and was the first chief commissioner at independence.

In 1996, the Association became a full member of the World Association, and at that time, membership was 613. As of 2017, there were 1,890 members. The Association closed for six years from 2016 to 2022 due to "internal matters".

== Activities ==
Due to the high diversity of the country, including the many languages of Papua New Guinea, developing projects that fit the local needs of the community is encouraged.

The Association aims to provide girls with training in homemaking activities such as cooking, sewing, and home management. A hostel was opened by the Association in 1987 and provided shelter for 60 girls who were working. In 1990, a literacy badge was introduced to help combat low literacy in Papua New Guinea during International Literacy Year. Solar cooking has been one initiative of the World Association since 2006, and Papua New Guinean Girl Guides have taught classes on it in various parts of the country.

== See also ==
- The Scout Association of Papua New Guinea
