= Wau Ecology Institute =

- Abbreviation: WEI
- Formation: 1961
- Founder: Judson Linsley Gressitt
- Dissolved: 2007
- Website: Wau Ecology Institute

The Wau Ecology Institute (WEI) was established in 1961 near the town of Wau, Papua New Guinea, in Morobe province, as a field station of the Bishop Museum. In 1973 it became an independent environmental organisation. It has laboratory space for visiting scientists, a herbarium and zoological reference collections. The Institute ceased operations around 2007 and is now run as a local coffee plantation by former employees and area gold miners.

== Publications ==
Some publications of the WEI are:

- Menzies, J.I. (1975). Handbook of Common New Guinea Frogs. WEI Handbook No.1. Wau Ecology Institute: PNG.
- Lamb, K.P.; & Gressitt, J.L. (eds). (1976). Ecology and Conservation in Papua New Guinea. WEI Pamphlet No.2. Wau Ecology Institute: Wau, PNG.
- Gressitt, J.L.; & Hornabrook, R.W. (1977). Handbook of Common New Guinea Beetles. WEI Handbook No.2. Wau Ecology Institute: Wau, PNG.
- Simon, Martin. (1977). Guide to Biological Terms in Melanesian Pidgin. WEI Handbook No.3. Wau Ecology Institute: Wau, PNG.
- Beehler, Bruce McP. (1978). Upland Birds of North-eastern New Guinea. A guide to the hill and mountain birds of Morobe Province. WEI Handbook No.4. Wau Ecology Institute: Wau, PNG.
- Gressitt, J.L.; & Nadkarni, Nalini. (1978). Guide to Mt Kaindi. Background to montane New Guinea ecology. WEI Handbook No.5. Wau Ecology Institute: Wau, PNG.
- Menzies, J.I.; & Dennis, Elizabeth. (1979). Handbook of New Guinea Rodents. WEI Handbook No.6. Wau Ecology Institute: PNG.
- McCoy, Michael. (1980). Reptiles of the Solomon Islands. WEI Handbook No.7. Wau Ecology Institute: Wau, PNG.
- Hadden, Don. (1981). Birds of the North Solomons. WEI Handbook No.8. Wau Ecological Institute: Wau, PNG.
- Beehler, Bruce McP.; Pratt, Thane K.; & Zimmerman, Dale Allen. (1986). Birds of New Guinea. WEI Handbook No.9. Wau Ecology Institute: Wau, PNG. Princeton University Press: Princeton, NJ, USA. ISBN 0-691-02394-8
- Höft, Robert. (1992). Plants of New Guinea and the Solomon Islands. Dictionary of the Genera and Families of Flowering Plants and Ferns. WEI Handbook No.13. Wau Ecology Institute: Wau, PNG.
