= Enny Moaitz =

Papua New Guinean politician

Enny Moaitz (born 1940) is a Papua New Guinean politician. She was Premier of Morobe Province from 1987 to 1988, becoming Papua New Guinea's first and only woman Premier under their former system of decentralised provincial government. She was also a member of the Tutumang, the provincial assembly, from 1980 to 1991.

== Biography ==
Moaitz was born in Morobe, and was educated at the Bula Lutheran Girls' Primary School and a Lutheran teachers' college at Goroka. She was a teacher at Balob and Port Moresby, taking night classes in the latter to complete her secondary education. She worked for the Lutheran Church for a period as coordinator of women's fellowships before returning to Morobe to work as a teacher, later becoming deputy headmistress of St Paul's Lutheran School in Lae. In 1973, she became involved in the Girl Guides, and was appointed as Territory Commissioner for Girl Guides, becoming Papua New Guinea's first Commissioner for Girl Guides at independence in 1975. She would hold that role from 1975 to 1986, from 1994 to 1997 and again for a period in the 2000s.

In 1978, she was nominated for the sole reserved seat for a woman in the new interim provincial assembly, and was Minister for Youth, Women and Home Affairs while remaining a full-time teacher. She then contested and won the Wanga constituency for the new provincial assembly, the Tutumang, at the 1980 election. She served as minister for a number of portfolios, including education, women, youth and home affairs, finance and forestry. She was part of the Morobe Independent Group of Utula Samana (Premier 1980-1987), and when he resigned to enter national politics in 1987, Moaitz, then Minister for Education and Finance, was elected unopposed as Premier. She was re-elected at the 1988 election, but faced heavy factional tensions within her party, many relating to the ongoing leadership of Samana, who retained significant influence over the party from his position in national politics. Moaitz and her faction were persuaded to support Hagai Joshua for Premier instead; they then withdrew support from Joshua and his faction. She continued in provincial politics until 1991, when she decided not to recontest her seat in favour of entering national politics; however, she was defeated at the 1992 general election. She was again defeated at the 1997 general election.

After leaving politics, she was involved in a number of community organisations, including serving as the Momase vice-president of the National Council of Women of Papua New Guinea and the president of the Morobe branch of PNG Women in Business.

In 2011, she attempted to nominate for the position of Governor-General of Papua New Guinea, securing the support of five MPs, but was thwarted by being given only 24 hours to secure nominations. She subsequently expressed her frustration at the process that had been used on that occasion.
