= Wau/Bulolo Urban LLG =

Local-level government in Papua New Guinea

Bulolo Urban LLG
- Country: Papua New Guinea
- Province: Morobe Province
- Time zone: UTC+10 (AEST)

Bulolo Urban LLG is a local-level government (LLG) located in the Bulolo Valley of Morobe Province, Papua New Guinea.

== Wards ==
- 80. Bulolo Urban
