= WAW =

Waw or WAW may refer to:

== Waw ==
- Waw, a letter in many Semitic abjads
- Waw, the velomobile
- Another spelling for the town Wau, South Sudan
- Waw Township, Burma
- Waw, the penultimate threat ranking for abnormalities in the Korean video game Lobotomy Corporation

== WAW ==
- Warsaw, capital city of the Republic of Poland
- Watchful waiting (watch and wait)
- We Are Wolves, a Quebec indie rock band
- Wild Atlantic Way, a tourism route in Ireland
- William Allen White, an American newspaper editor
- Wired All Wrong, a band
- Women are wonderful effect
- Women's Archive Wales
- World Association of Wrestling, a British professional wrestling promotion, owned by Ricky Knight
- Wrestling Around the World, another British professional wrestling promotion, owned by Jackie Pallo
- World at War (disambiguation)
- The World Atlas of Wine
- Call of Duty: World at War, a video game
- "We Are the World", Michael Jackson's and associates' song
- Wings and Wheels format of the VintageAirRally
- Write after write (WAW) hazard, a data dependency hazard
- Wuzheng Auto Works, a brand of trucks owned by the Shandong Wuzheng Group CO., LTD
- Survivor: Winners at War, the 40th season of American reality competition Survivor

=== Call signs and codes ===
- WAW (TV station)
- Warsaw Chopin Airport (IATA airport code)
- Golden West Network

== See also ==
- Wau (disambiguation)
