= Gurney Airport =

Airport in Milne Bay, Papua New Guinea

- IATA: GUR; ICAO: AYGN

Summary
- Airport type: Public
- Operator: Government
- Serves: Alotau, Milne Bay Province, Papua New Guinea
- Elevation AMSL: 18.6 m (61 ft)
- Coordinates: 10°18′41″S 150°20′01″E

Map
- Location of the airport in Papua New Guinea

Runways
Direction	Length		Surface
Direction	m	ft	Surface
09/27	1,690	5,545	Asphalt
- Source: WAD, GCM

Gurney Airport (IATA: GUR, ICAO: AYGN) is an airport serving Alotau in the Milne Bay Province of Papua New Guinea (PNG).

The airport is a single runway general aviation facility. In December 2008, the PNG Minister for Transport and Civil Aviation, Don Polye announced that the aviation company SkyAirWorld had been granted permission to operate direct flights from Cairns, Australia to Gurney.

== History ==
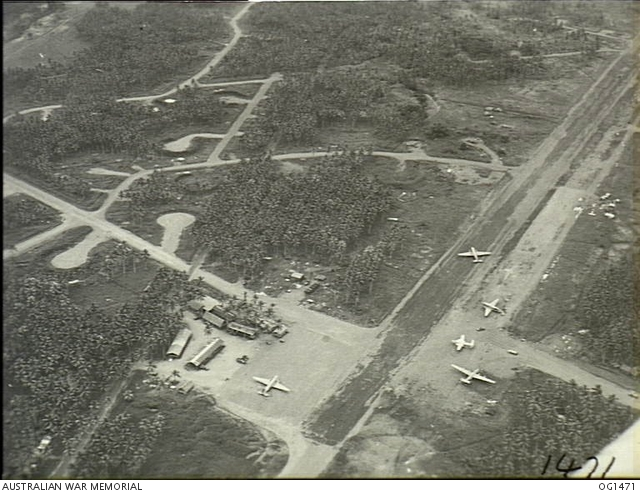
Gurney Airfield

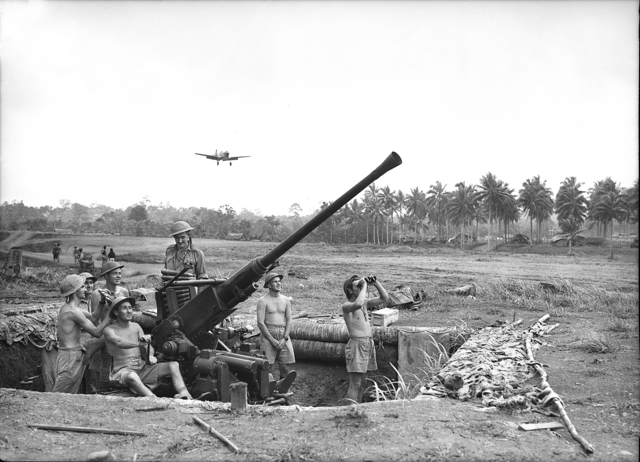
An Australian Bofors 40 mm anti-aircraft gun of the 2/9th Light Anti-Aircraft Battery at Milne Bay Gurney Airport No. 1 Airstrip

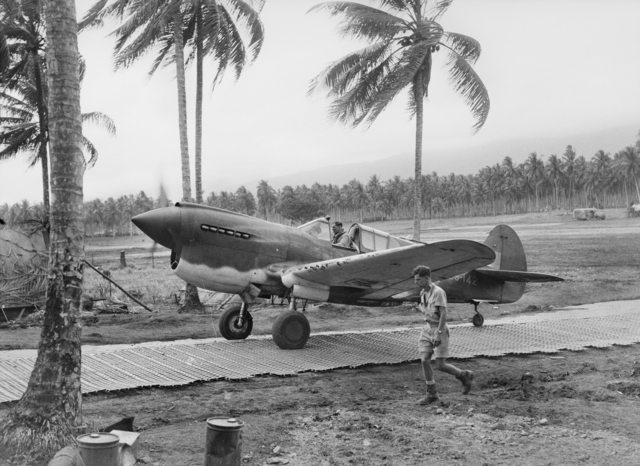
An Australian P-40 at Milne Bay

Built by the US Army 96th Engineer General Service Regiment, Company E of 46th Engineer General Service Regiment and No. 6 Mobile Works Squadron RAAF during World War II. Named after Charles Raymond Gurney an Australian aviator. Consisting of two parallel runways with the first runway 6,000 feet (1,800 m) long by 150 feet (46 m) wide surfaced with bitumen and the second runway 5,340 feet (1,630 m) long x 100 feet (30 m) wide surfaced with marston matting. Taxiways and revetments extended off both sides of the runways. Known as Fall River Aerodrome and No. 1 Strip. The airfield was named Gurney Field on 14 September 1942 in honour of Royal Australian Air Force Squadron Leader C.R. Gurney, who was killed in an aircraft crash.

The airfield was reopened in early 1966, as a part of the Australian colonial policy of having each of the provincial capitals served by daily flights. The last Sunbird PBY service to Samarai was in January of that year. A number of other WWII airfields were reopened in the area, such as Vivigani Airfield and Misima (April 1964). Several airlines then operated daily passenger and freight services into Gurney, using larger aircraft.

=== Allied units based at Gurney Field ===
- 8th Fighter Group (18 September 1942 – February 1943)

Headquarters, 35th Fighter Squadron, P-40 Warhawk, 36th Fighter Squadron, (P-39 Airacobra, P-400, and P-40 Warhawk), 80th Fighter Squadron P-38 Lightning, P-39 Airacobra.

- 418th Night Fighter Squadron, (V Fighter Command), (2–22 November 1943), P-61 Black Widow
- 421st Night Fighter Squadron, (V Fighter Command), (4–27 January 1944), P-61 Black Widow
- No. 32 Squadron RAAF - (Lockheed Hudson)
- No. 75 Squadron RAAF (P-40)
- No. 76 Squadron RAAF (P-40)
- No. 100 Squadron RAAF
- No. 10 Repair and Salvage Unit RAAF
- A Troop, 9 Battery, 2/3 Australian Light Anti-aircraft Regiment

== Facilities ==
The airport resides at an elevation of 88 feet (27 m) above mean sea level. It has one runway designated 09/27 with an asphalt surface measuring 1,690 by 30 metres (5,545 ft × 98 ft).

== Airlines and destinations ==
Gurney Airport is connected to Port Moresby International Airport by PNG Air and Air Niugini, and to Losuia Airport and Misima Island Airport by PNG Air.

== See also ==
- USAAF in the Southwest Pacific
- Naval Base Milne Bay
