= Wantoat/Leron Rural LLG =

Local-level government in Papua New Guinea

- Location within Papua New Guinea
- Coordinates: 6.129933°S 146.467471°E
- Country: Papua New Guinea
- Province: Morobe Province
- Time zone: UTC+10 (AEST)

Wantoat/Leron Rural LLG is a local-level government (LLG) of Morobe Province, Papua New Guinea.

== Wards ==
- 01. Matak
- 02. Mataya
- 03. Guningwan
- 04. Arawik
- 05. Umbaku
- 06. Yaparwguan
- 07. Gwambongwak
- 08. Sengapan
- 09. Kubung
- 10. Uyam
- 11. Bumbum
- 12. Daimsot
- 13. Ewok
- 14. Ginonga
- 15. Kamang
- 16. Gumia
- 17. Daku
- 18. Sukurum (Sukurum language speakers)
- 19. Som (Sarasira language speakers)
- 20. Ngariawang
