= Siassi Rural LLG =

Local-level government in Papua New Guinea

- Country: Papua New Guinea
- Province: Morobe Province
- Time zone: UTC+10 (AEST)

Siassi Rural LLG is a local-level government (LLG) of Morobe Province, Papua New Guinea.

== Wards ==
- 01. Lokep
- 02. Masele
- 03. Aimalu
- 04. Aupwel
- 05. Samanai
- 06. Semo
- 07. Pandamot
- 08. Tagop
- 09. Opai
- 10. Bunsil
- 11. Aronai
- 12. Malai
- 13. Tuam
- 14. Mandok
- 15. Giam
- 16. Gune
- 17. Lablab 1
- 18. Marile
- 19. Mabey
- 20. Movi
