= Wau Rural LLG =

Local-level government in Papua New Guinea

- Location within Papua New Guinea
- Coordinates: 7.351874°S 146.730071°E
- Country: Papua New Guinea
- Province: Morobe Province

Area
  - Total: 2,347 km^{2} (906 sq mi)

Population (2011 census)
  - Total: 29,253
  - Density: 12.46/km^{2} (32.28/sq mi)
- Time zone: UTC+10 (AEST)

Wau Rural LLG is a local-level government (LLG) of Morobe Province, Papua New Guinea.

== Wards ==
- 01. Maus Bokis
- 02. Mrs Booth
- 03. Maus Kuranga
- 04. 4 Mile/Nami
- 05. Wara Muli (DAL Stn.)
- 06. Nemnem Station
- 07. Eddie Creek
- 08. Bitoi
- 09. Wandumi
- 10. Sandy Creek
- 11. Kwembu
- 12. Kaisenik
- 13. Biawen
- 14. Were Were
- 15. Winima
- 16. Elauru
- 17. Wisini
- 18. Kembaka
- 19. Tori
- 20. Tekadu
