= Alotau Urban LLG =

Local-level government in Papua New Guinea

Alotau Rural LLG
- Country: Papua New Guinea
- Province: Milne Bay Province
- Time zone: UTC+10 (AEST)

Alotau Rural LLG is a local-level government (LLG) of Milne Bay Province, Papua New Guinea.

== Wards ==
- 80. Alotau Town
