= Morobe Goldfield =

Mine in Morobe, Papua New Guinea

The Morobe goldfield is in Morobe, Papua New Guinea, and mined gold. It was the largest employer of indentured labour on the island at one time, employing many Biangai people. On 30 June 1936 there were 13,121 labourers in Morobe as a whole, 6816 of whom were classified as involved in mining at Wau and Bulolo. But that was the limit of local involvement until 1957 when the Administration began to issue miner's permits to Papua New Guineans. By this time the peak of alluvial production was past, but from this point the proportion of the total in local hands rose to 80% by 1975, according to a 1975 analysis of buying records.
