= Wau, Papua New Guinea =

Wau
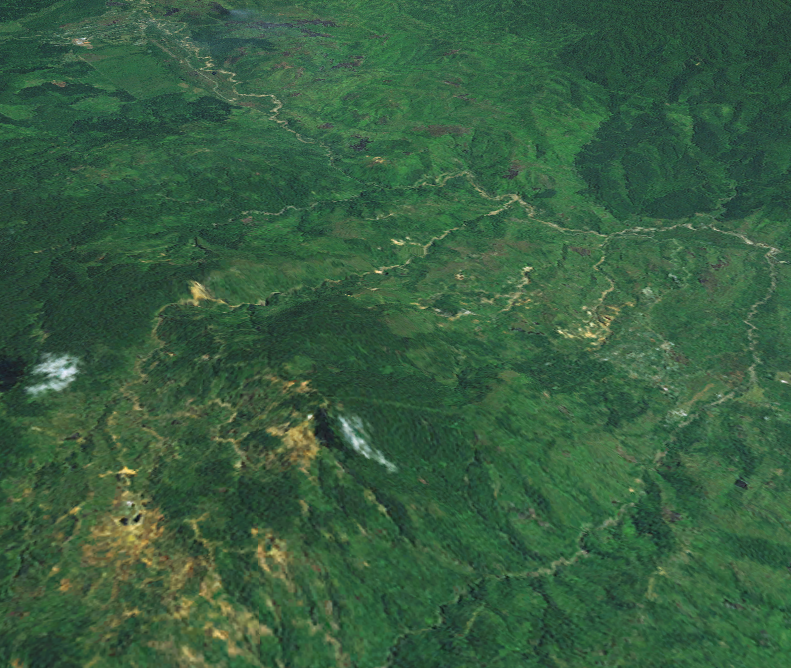
- A satellite image of Wau and its mines, looking towards Bulolo

- Location within Papua New Guinea
- Coordinates: 7°20′20″S 146°43′00″E
- Country: Papua New Guinea
- Province: Morobe Province
- District: Wau-Waria
- LLG: Wau Urban
- Elevation: 1,080 m (3,540 ft)

Population (2005 est)
  - Total: 5,000
  - Rank: 26th
- Time zone: UTC+10 (AEST)
- Location: 74 km (46 mi) from Lae; 241 km (150 mi) from Port Melvin
- Climate: Af

Wau is a town in Papua New Guinea, in the province of Morobe. It has a population of approx 5,000 and is situated at an altitude of around 1100 metres. Wau was the site of a gold rush during the 1920s and 30s when prospective gold diggers arrived at the coast at Salamaua and struggled inland along the Black Cat Track.

At the Battle of Wau in January 1943, the Australian Army stopped an advance by the Japanese. A road was established soon after World War II to Lae and this fostered the further development of local timber and agricultural industries that were originally established in support of the mining industry. While much of the mineral reserves have been extracted, industrial gold mining continues at Edie Creek and at the newly established Hidden Valley Gold Mine operated by Morobe Goldfields (a subsidiary of Harmony Gold – South Africa).

The Wau Ecology Institute is a biological research station situated near Wau.

== Gold mining history ==
=== Gold rush ===
The first strike at Wau, the start of what would be known as the Morobe Goldfield, was made at Koranga Creek by William ‘Shark-Eye’ Park, probably towards the end of 1921. Park and his partner, Jack Nettleton, ran a clandestine mining operation for twelve months from April 1922 until a new Mining Ordinance enabled them to get their gold out legally. Nettleton, it is known, took out 6000 troy ounces, or about 190 kg, of gold in August 1923.

Only a handful of miners worked the field, rich as it was, until 1924. From 1924 to 1926 perhaps 20 miners were on the field producing about 200 kg of gold a year. The real rush began in 1926 with much bigger discoveries at Edie Creek, above Wau. The new rush made air transport viable and Wau's airstrip opened in 1927 by the Parer brothers originally of Spanish descent. In 1928 there were 200 miners and production was about three tonnes a year.

The influx of miners was often in conflict with the area's indigenous populations, including the Biangai along the Bulolo River and the Watut along the Watut River. During the early gold rush (1924–1927) prospectors and carriers employed from the coast followed paths through some of the Biangai villages. Accusations of theft from gardens against coastal carriers resulted a number being killed. In response, miners burned a Biangai village, and killed three men and a woman who died in a house that was burnt down. The beginning of air transport reduced the need for lines of carriers. In 1972, in the 6000 hectares case, PNGLR 71 (19 July 1972) the Biangai won the restitution of the Morobe Goldfields in the Supreme Court of Papua New Guinea and compensation was awarded in respect of historical gold sales.

=== Companies ===
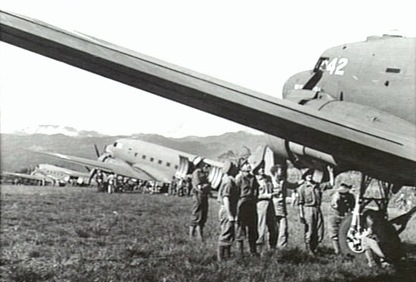
Unloading WWII transport planes at an advance airfield near Wau in 1943

Park quit Wau in 1926 as a wealthy man. After this properly capitalised companies were formed. New Guinea Goldfields, Ltd (NGG) was the biggest operator, but there were many others: for example, Koranga Gold Sluicing, Sandy Creek Gold Sluicing, Edie Creek Gold Mining Company, The Golden Deeps N.L., Upper Watut Gold Alluvials, Placer Development Limited, and so on. In subsequent years, NGG consolidated control over much of the mineral reserves using its large capitalisation to purchase the smaller leases.

Underground mining began with the Day Dawn mine in 1931; a number of similar operations were opened before and after the Second World War. These mines were very small by modern standards, the biggest being Upper Ridges with a total production of 2.9 tonnes over eighteen years.

Open cut mining was carried out at Golden Ridges mine between 1932 and 1941, and other pits yielded gold in the Namie area both before and after the war. Most were small and short-lived; the richest was Golden Peaks, producing about six and half tonnes of gold between 1962 and 1977. The Golden Peaks mill also processed ore brought to it by an aerial ropeway from new workings at Upper Ridges.

Bulolo Gold Dredging (BGD) began operations at the sister town of Bulolo in 1932 and was responsible for the bulk of pre-war gold production: about 40 tonnes in total. Seven of the eventual eight dredges worked the Bulolo Valley gravels; one only, No. 6, worked in the Wau Valley. Large operations ceased to be attractive after WWII, partly due to pegging of the gold price at pre-war prices and the last dredge ceased operating in 1965.

=== Alluvial mining ===
At peak production, the Morobe Goldfield was the largest consumer of indentured labour in the Territory of New Guinea. On 30 June 1936 there were 13,121 labourers in Morobe as a whole, 6816 of whom were classified as involved in mining at Wau and Bulolo. But that was the limit of local involvement until 1957 when the Administration began to issue miner’s permits to Papua New Guineans. By this time the peak of alluvial production was past, but from this point the proportion of the total in local hands rose to 80% by 1975, according to a 1975 analysis of buying records.

Most of the miners were, and still are, operating with the simple methods of dishing and boxing, or gold panning. They make little capital expenditure and have a limited ability to discover new reefs. Production has dropped steadily since a post-war peak in 1953, as the small-scale miners attempt to make a living from alluvial ground constantly worked over since the 1920s.

=== Timber mills ===
Timber mills in Wau were started by Roy Hyde in 1935, who arrived with his wife, two sons and a daughter. Timber was floated down the Bulolo river to the coast, which was used for house building in Lae and other resorts along the coast. Natives would guide the rafts to their destinations.

=== Notable people ===
- John Laws, Australian radio personality, born in Wau 8 August 1935.
