= The Scout Association of Papua New Guinea =

Scouting organisation in Papua New Guinea

- Country: Papua New Guinea
- Founded: 1975; 51 years ago
- Founder: The Boy Scouts Association (United Kingdom)
- Membership: 6,284 (unaudited)
- Affiliation: World Organization of the Scout Movement

The Scout Association of Papua New Guinea is a Scouting organisation in Papua New Guinea. It had its origins in 1926 as a branch of The Boy Scouts Association of the United Kingdom. It claimed an unaudited membership of 6,284 in 2011.

== History ==
In 1926, The Boy Scouts Association of the United Kingdom established a section in what is now Papua New Guinea. This section operated under The Boy Scouts Association's Australian Federal Council. In 1958, The Boy Scouts Association, Papua and New Guinea Branch became a branch of The Australian Boy Scouts Association, when it was formed as a branch of The Boy Scouts Association of the United Kingdom. The Boy Scouts Association, Papua and New Guinea Branch, changed its name to The Scout Association of Papua New Guinea. The National Scout Council of The Scout Association of Papua New Guinea was incorporated in 1975. The Scout Association of Papua New Guinea joined the World Organization of the Scout Movement in 1976.

== Programme and ideals ==
The Association's program requires all members to have a good understanding of their own local customs and traditions, as well as those of the other regions.

- Junior Scouts-ages 8–12
- Scouts-ages 12–16
- Senior Scouts-ages 16–25
- Rover Scouts ages 18-30

The Scout emblem incorporates traditional arrows and a kundu drum.

== See also ==
- Girl Guides Association of Papua New Guinea
