= Morobe Bay =

Morobe Bay is a bay within Huon Gulf, on the coast of Morobe Province, Papua New Guinea.

== History ==
The American and Australian armed forces used Morobe Bay, also known as "Morobe Harbour", as a safe anchorage and staging point as part of the New Guinea campaign during World War II.

A PT boat advanced base was relocated from Tufi and set up within Morobe Bay by the US Navy, instead of Douglas Harbour near Cape Ward Hunt on 20 April 1943.
