= Morobe, Papua New Guinea =

Coordinates: 7°45′27″S 147°35′39″E

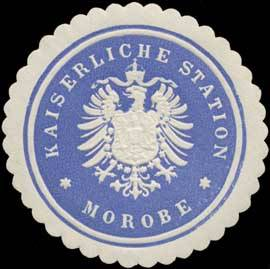
Sealing stamp, K. Station Morobe

Morobe (Tok Pisin: Morobe Viles) is a small coastal village located in Morobe Bay, in the south of Morobe Province, Papua New Guinea.

== History ==
An administrative post for the protectorate of German New Guinea, it was occupied by Australian troops of the Australian Naval and Military Expeditionary Force in 1914 during World War I.

During World War II, Morobe was occupied by the Imperial Japanese in 1942. On 3 April 1943 the United States Army liberated Morobe. The village and surrounding area became a staging point for American and Australian troops during the New Guinea campaign.

Nearby Yanina village made headlines around the world after Thomas Eri, a sex cult leader who promised bumper banana crops for those who had sex in public in front of him, escaped from police with seven of his naked followers.

== Airport ==
Morobe town is serviced by Morobe Airport.
