= Bulolo =

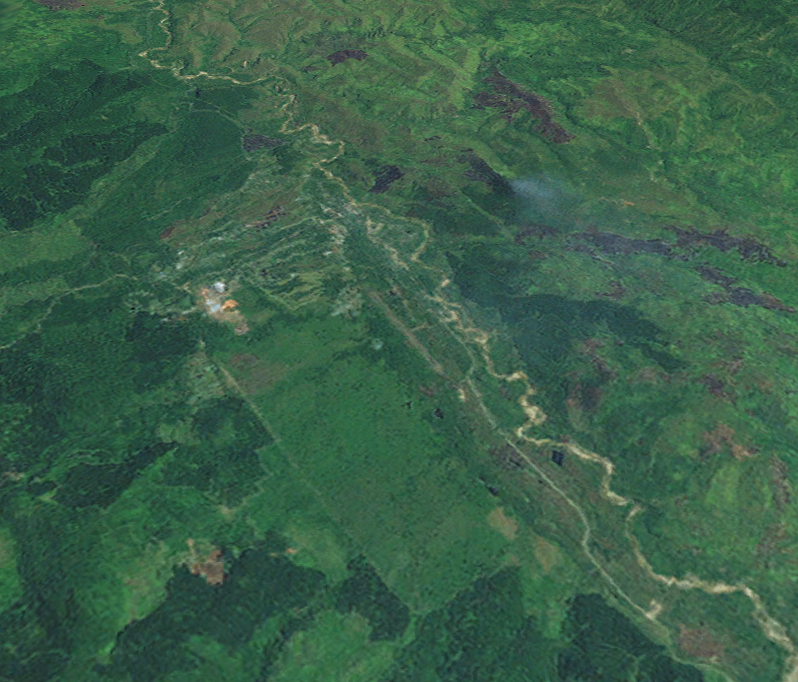
- A satellite image of Bulolo

- Location within Papua New Guinea
- Coordinates: 7°12′0″S 146°38′48″E
- Country: Papua New Guinea
- Province: Morobe Province
- District: Bulolo District
- LLG: Bulolo Urban
- Established: ~1930
- Elevation: 700 m (2,300 ft)

Population (2010 est.)
  - Total: 20,000
- Time zone: UTC+10 (AEST)
- Location: 43 km (27 mi) south of Lae; 32 km (20 mi) north-west of Wau
- Annual rainfall: 1,600 mm (62.99 in)
- Climate: Af

Bulolo is a town in Bulolo Urban LLG, Morobe Province, Papua New Guinea. It was once an important gold dredging centre in the former Territory of New Guinea, situated on the Bulolo River, a tributary of the Markham River, about 32 km (20 mi) north-west of Wau. The town is served by Bulolo Airport. Built in June 1930, the Bulolo strip was originally 1,150 yards by 120 yards. In 2010 it had an estimated population of 20,000.

Currently, the town's major industries includes forestry, with the PNG Forest Products Limited the main enterprise. There is also an Insect Farming and Trading Agency, which promotes insect farming and conservation.

== History ==
Dredging for gold was begun on 21 March 1932, with the whole of the 1,100 ton dredge (No 1 dredge) transported to the field in pieces by air from the port city of Lae. The largest single part was the main tumbler shaft, 12 feet long and weighing 6,870 pounds. Construction of No 2 dredge was underway before No 1 dredge was completed. In all eight dredges were constructed and operated, the last going into operations in 1939.

Dredging operations were interrupted by the war in 1941, and were not resumed until six years later. On 5 February 1942 at 11am, Bulolo was bombed by five twin-engine bombers.

Gold production in 1952 amounted to 122,035 ounces, valued at £1,311,241, and constituted 77 per cent of the gold produced in New Guinea in that year. As the gold petered out the dredges were abandoned and they can still be found along the Bulolo river bed.

Bulolo was the headquarters of a company formed to exploit the pine forests that grow in the valley. In conjunction with the milling of timber an extensive scheme of re-afforestation was undertaken to ensure perpetuity of supplies.

Since the 1950s Bulolo has been connected to Lae by a vehicular road along the Bulolo and Markham River valleys.

== See also ==
- John Alexander Agnew
