= Biangai =

Papuan tribe

The Biangai people are an ethnic group living on the slopes of the upper Bulolo valley, in Papua New Guinea.

The Biangais have been in a land dispute with the neighboring Watuts for a number of years. In 2009, five people were killed in a clash between them. The Watut registered a land mediation court with the Buolo District Court in November 2011, but the land matter remain unresolved.
