= Morobe Province =

Province in Papua New Guinea

Morobe Province Morobe Provins (Tok Pisin)
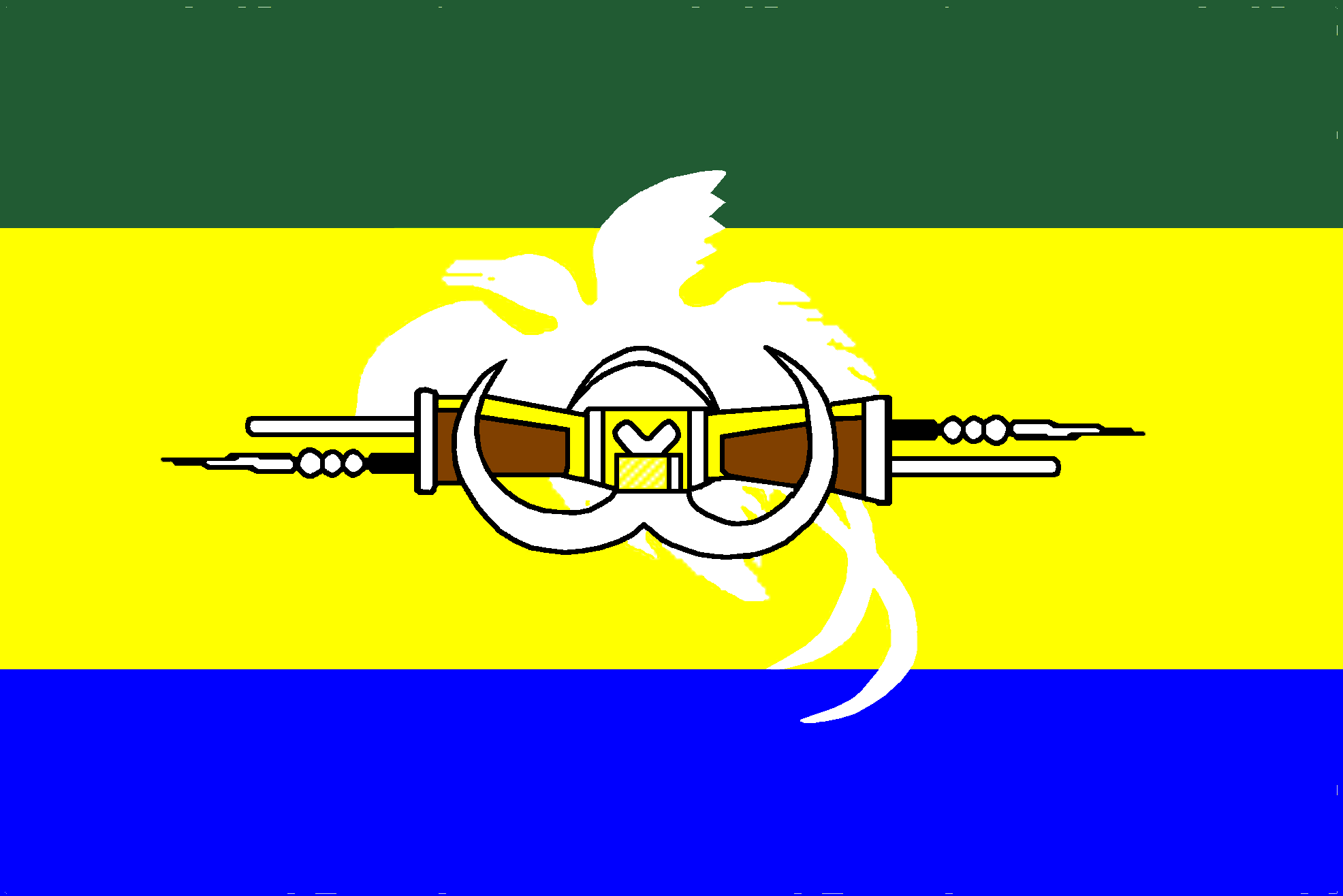
- Flag

- Morobe Province in Papua New Guinea
- Coordinates: 6°50′S 146°40′E
- Country: Papua New Guinea
- Region: Momase
- Capital: Lae
- Districts: List: Bulolo District; Finschhafen District; Huon District; Kabwum District; Lae District; Markham District; Menyamya District; Nawae District; Tewae-Siassi District; Wau-Waria District

Area
  - Total: 33,705 km^{2} (13,014 sq mi)

Population (2024 census.)
  - Total: 997,545
  - Density: 29.596/km^{2} (76.654/sq mi)
- Time zone: UTC+10 (AEST)
- ISO 3166 code: PG-MPL
- HDI (2019): 0.592 medium · 6th of 22

Morobe is a province on the northern coast of Papua New Guinea. The provincial capital and largest city is Lae. The province covers 33,705 km^{2}, with a population of 674,810 (2011 census), and since the division of Southern Highlands Province in May 2012 it is the most populous province. It includes the Huon Peninsula, the Markham River, and delta, and coastal territories along the Huon Gulf. The province has nine administrative districts. At least 101 languages are spoken, including Kâte and Yabem language. English and Tok Pisin are common languages in the urban areas, and in some areas pidgin forms of German are mixed with the native language.

== History ==
=== Nomenclature ===
The Morobe Province takes its name from former German administration center of Morobe southeast of the Lae. Under German administration, Morobe (meaning post) was named Adolfhafen for the German Deutsch Neuguinea-Kompagnie's Adolf von Hansemann and German word hafen (heɪfən) meaning port) and was an outpost of the Deutsch Neuguinea-Kompagnie era. It was located close to the border of British New Guinea.

=== Brief history ===
While there have been various attempts to examine the history of Morobe Province, the works of Ian Willis and Phillip Holzknecht can be summarised below;

- 1793 Antoine Bruni d'Entrecasteaux sailed up tail of New Guinea into the Gulf he named Huon de Kermadec
- 1856 Italian Catholic priests arrived at Mandok Island, Siassi, before disease forced him to leave.
- 1874 John Moresby on HMS Basilisk sails along Huon Gulf and names Parsee Point (Salamaua), the Markham, Rawlinson Ranges, and explores around the Markham's mouth.
- 1884 Otto Finsch on `Samoa' explores New Guinea under Deutsche Neuguinea-Kompagnie and selects Finschhafen as the best site for company settlement. The same year, Northeast New Guinea and its Offshore islands were claimed by Germany, while Britain claimed Southeast New Guinea. (later Papua)
- 1886 Georg von Schlientz, a New Guinea company representative arrives in Finschhafen to set up settlement on Madang Island. He undertakes exploration along the coast and names areas with prominent German names. He states that one-day the Markham mouth will become an important port for trade. Martin Dreger explores the Huon Gulf on `Samoa' and travels upstream on the Markham and saw villagers, who were willing to trade for iron. During the same year Lutheran missionary Johann Flierl arrives in Simbang.
- 1887 The Deutsche Neuguinea-Kompagnie abandons Finschhafen because of malaria and decides to move to [Friedrich-Wilhelms-Hafen/Madang|with an agricultural station at nearby Stephensort/Bogadjim]. The Lutheran mission stayed on in Finschhafen and expanded its influence along coastal villages.
- 1900 Deutsche Neuguinea-Kompagnie land acquisition in Lae.
- 1907 Lae Wampar raid villages at Lae and Labu.
- 1909 Stephen Lehner and Dr. Neuhauss visit Lae Wampar to establish peace among the warring tribes.
- 1910–11 Ten Lutheran mission stations, including Lae and Gabmatzung among the Lae Wampar were established.
- 1913 Burgberg (Lae) gazetted as a patrol post, Morobe was still a German government outpost.
- 1914 Australian Military Occupation of former German New Guinea as a result of the outbreak of World War I.
- 1921–1925 Civil Administration restored in New Guinea as an Australian Mandated Territory for the League of Nations.
- 1926 Gold is discovered in Eddie Creek, near Wau. There was a gold rush. Salamaua becomes a port of call for all activities relating to Wau gold fields.
- 1937 Lae becomes the capital of New Guinea, replacing Rabaul.
- 1942 Japanese bomb Lae, Salamaua and Bulolo on 21 January. Japanese land in Lae on 8 March.
- 1942–1945 War arrives in New Guinea and there is a military administration in the Territory. The administration was referred to by ANGAU which stands for Australian New Guinea Administrative Unit.
- 1943 Following the losses in Buna and Kokoda Trail, the Japanese fall back to Lae.
- 1945–1950 Slow recovery of the territory.
- 1950–1975 Period of rapid expansion in the territory.
- 1960s Lutheran church goes into business launching Lutheran Shipping and Namasu.
- 1964 First House of Assembly Election
- 1975 Political independence

=== German New Guinea ===
The largest part of northeastern New Guinea in German New Guinea (German: Deutsch-Neuguinea) was called Kaiser-Wilhelmsland, named in honour of Wilhelm II, the German Emperor and King of Prussia. From 1884 until 1918, the territory was a protectorate of the German Empire

The coastline of the northern and eastern portions of New Guinea had been charted by navigators in the early 17th century, and the visible mountain ranges named by British admiralty navigators later in the century. Most German surveying efforts had focused on coastal regions and river basins, where Germans had established plantations. The boundary between Papua and Kaiser Wilhelmsland had been established by a joint British-German expedition in 1909, the interior had not been mapped. Since then, Papuan gold prospectors had crossed into German territory which, from the German perspective, made the accuracy of the border essential.

=== 1870–1880 ===
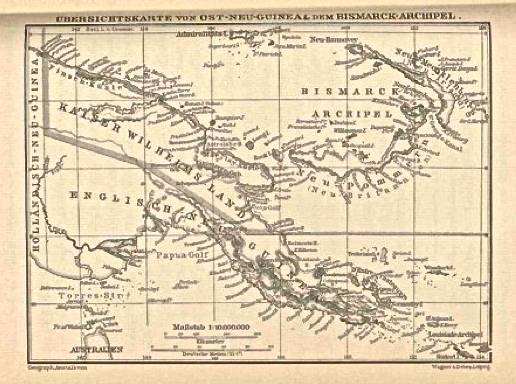
Map of Kaiser Wilhelms-Land and Ost Neu Guinea

The first European to spend any length of time in Morobe was Russian biologist Nicolai Miklouho-Maclay. He arrived at Astrolabe Bay, south of the present site of Madang, in 1871 and stayed for 15 months before leaving to regain his health,

1874 John Moresby on HMS Basilisk sails along Huon Gulf and names Parsee Point (Salamaua), the Markham, Rawlinson Ranges, and explores around the Markham mouth, and meet up with people along the coast; who according to him seem to have met white men before.

In the 1870s and 1880s German commercial firms began to site trading stations in New Guinea. Agents of J.C. Godeffroy & Sohn reached the Bismarck Archipelago from the Caroline Islands in 1872. In 1875 Hernsheim & Company moved to the Archipelago.

=== 1880–1900 ===
In 1884, the German New Guinea Company was founded in Berlin by Adolph von Hansemann, Dr Otto Finsch and a syndicate of German bankers for the purpose of colonizing and exploiting resources on Neu Guinea (German New Guinea), where German interest grew after British Queensland's annexation of part of eastern New Guinea.

Von Hansemann's task was to select land for plantation development on the north-east coast of New Guinea and establish trading posts. Its influence soon grew to encompass the entire north-eastern part of New Guinea and some of the islands off the coast.

Most of the German settlers to Kaiser-Wilhelmsland were plantation owners, miners, and government functionaries, and the number of European settlers, including non-Germans, was never very high.

On 19 August 1884, Chancellor Bismarck ordered the establishment of a German protectorate in the New Britain Archipelago and north-eastern New Guinea.

In 1885 and 1887, Johann Flierl established missionary stations in Simbang and Timba Island. After malaria epidemics in 1889 and again in 1891 killed almost half of the European settlers on the coast in Finschhafen, many of the Europeans moved toward Friedrich Wilhelmshafen (now Madang). Flierl established a Mission station at Sattelberg, 700 metres (2,297 ft) in the highlands. In 1890 and 1891, he built the Sattelberg Mission Station there and constructed a road approximately 24 kilometres (15 mi) between the station and the Finsch harbor (Finschhafen), which cut the traveling time from three days to five hours.

In 1885, Lutheran and Catholic congregations sent clergy to establish missions, who experienced moderate, but very slow, success with the indigenous peoples. Missionaries and plantation owners alike were limited by tropical diseases, travel, and communication barriers.

German colonial rule in New Guinea lasted for a period of thirty years, For the first fifteen years the colony was administered under imperial charters by a private company, in the manner of the old British and Dutch East India Company. From 1899 to 1914, the Imperial Government administered German New Guinea through a governor, who was assisted after 1904 by a nominated Government Council.

When the Imperial Government took over the running of the colony in 1899, its overriding objective was rapid economic development, based on a German- controlled plantation economy.

=== 1900–1914 ===
In April 1911, Dr Wegener, director of the Meteorological Observatory in Apia, stated he was on his way to German New Guinea, to make preliminary arrangements for a series of journeys by balloon across the mainland, the purpose of which was to make aerial surveys.

In late 1913, the Imperial Colonial Office appointed Hermann Detzner to lead an expedition to survey the border between the British protectorate, called Papua and the German territory and to survey and map the interior. Detzner, an Austrian, was a military surveyor.

The expedition set off along the Langimar-Watut divide, and traveled by raft down the Watut River to its junction with the Markham River, and on to the Lutheran Mission station at Gabmadzung

=== 1914–1918 ===
German hotel at Herbertshöhe (Kokopo) on New Pomerania, circa 1912. The small German colony in Herbertshöhe capitulated to the Australian troops by mid-September 1914.

On 4 August 1914, Britain declared war on Germany. As World War I spread to the Pacific, Australian troops invaded German New Guinea, taking the German barracks in Herbertshöhe (present day Kokopo) and forcing the defending German colonial troops to capitulate on 21 September after their defeat at Bita Paka.

On 6 August 1914, residents of the Protectorate were notified by proclamation that a state of war existed between Germany, and England, France and Russia. During this time Detzner continued surveying and avoiding allied forces.

On 11 November 1918, Detzner was advised that the war had ended and surrendered himself at Finschafen complete with sword and sun helmet. He was interned at Sydney and returned to Germany.

Under German New Guinea, powerful wireless stations were constructed at strategic points in the Pacific including Yap, Nauru, Samoa, and at Bita Paka, in German New Guinea.

The German protectorate was overrun by British-Australian troops. In 1918, as part of the settlements ending World War I, Kaiser-Wilhemsland was administered by the Commonwealth of Australia, a British dominion.

=== 1920–1945 ===
In 1918, Kaiser Wilhelmsland and the other territories that comprised German New Guinea (New Pomerania and the islands of the Bismarck Archipelago) were administered by the Commonwealth of Australia. Beginning in 1920, Australia, under a mandate from the League of Nations, governed the former German territory of New Guinea. It was administered under this mandate until the Japanese invasion in December 1941 (Operation Mo). Most of the territory of New Guinea, was occupied by Japanese forces before recapture during the final months of the war in the Australian-American New Guinea campaign.

District officers and patrol officers, known as Kiaps provided administrative functions as a one-man representative of the government, taking on policing and judicial roles as well as more mundane tasks as completing censuses. The Kiaps were commissioned as officers of the Royal Papua New Guinea Constabulary and Magistrates.

Patrol posts were established in populated areas around the Province. The former German administrative center, Adolfhaven, was renamed the Morobe Patrol Post and a Sub-District headquarters established in Kaiapit and Kainantu and District headquarters established in Lae and patrol posts established in Wantoat and other areas in the province During the 1960s the kiap became more like a magistrate, moving away from law enforcement.

=== World War II ===
Morobe province was a key campaign site during World War II. The Japanese had established strong supply bases in the towns of Lae and Salamaua in 1942. The Salamaua-Lae campaign of the following year was a series of actions in which the Australian and United States forces sought to capture the two Japanese bases. The campaign to take the area began with the Australian attack on Japanese positions near Mubo, on 22 April 1943 and ended with the fall of Lae on September 16, 1943, in Operation Postern. The campaign was notable not only for its classic defense maneuvers at the Landing at Nadzab and the brutal hand-to-hand combat at Salamaua; Lyndon B. Johnson, the 36th President of the United States, saw his sole 13 minutes of combat on a bombing mission over Lae. Although the plane he was supposed to fly was shot down, with no survivors, his flight in a Martin B-26 Marauder had repercussions throughout the Pacific theater. Sent as an observer, with instructions to report up the line to Roosevelt, to Congress, and to the Navy brass that the conditions in the Pacific were deplorable, the men had third–rate equipment to fight Japan's first class planes. The effort needed another 6,800 trained and experienced men, plus better supplies, provisions, and generally a higher priority in the war effort.

The Lae War Cemetery is located adjacent to the Botanical Gardens in the center of the city of Lae. The cemetery was begun in 1944 by the Australian Army Graves Services, and the Commonwealth Graves Commission assumed responsibility for it in 1947. The Lae Memorial commemorates 300 men of the Australian forces (including Merchant Navy, Royal Australian Air Force, and the Australian Army) who lost their lives and have no known grave. It contains 2300–2800 burials, of which 444 are unidentified.

=== 1945–1960 ===
After the World War 2, Morobe Province was in a neglected state with the main economic activity being the collection and sale of war disposal equipment. The expatriate population looked at expanding the agricultural sector. The Australian Minister of Territories was Mr. Eddie Ward who refused to allow any land purchases. Following a change of government, Mr. Percy Spender changed this policy, and the introduction of the Ex-Servicemen's Credit Scheme resulted in a significant increase in agricultural activity through all of the country.

=== Pre-1975 ===
In 1970 mineral exports were a mere 1 percent of total exports. Within 2 years, this figure had risen to 55 percent.

== Ecology ==
Papua New Guinea is part of the Australasian realm. Through eco-tourism, the province capitalizes on its scenery, readily accessible diving locales, and its mountains and jungles which offer tourists coral reef, rain forest, tropical habitat, sub-alpine and alpine tours. The province's jungles and forests are also popular for viewing over 1,000 of species of birds and mammals, including the colourful emperor bird of paradise, the flightless cassowary and varieties of macropods, including the tree-kangaroo and over 15,000 species of plants. The Huon Peninsula, which comprises most of the provincial land-mass, is a montane eco-region that contains a unique variety of plants and conditions. Its coral reefs and volcanic inlets are home to thousands of species of fish and oceanic life in the reefs and wrecks.

In 2009, the YUS Conservation Area has been established in the northern part of the Huon Peninsula. YUS stretches over 760 km^{2} and includes three rivers: Yopno, Uruwa and Som, after which it was named. It is a critical habitat for the endangered matschie's tree-kangaroo.

== Economy ==
Morobe Province's economy has grown at the rate of approximately two percent per annum since 2006. The economic base of the Morobe Province depends on the production and harvesting of cocoa, coffee, copra and sugar, and tropical fruits (bananas, coconuts). Oil and gas industries are emerging, as is new mining and energy industry. Deteriorating roads and the lack of manufacturing and transportation/communication infrastructure impedes economic development.

=== Mining ===
The Hidden Valley mine is a gold and silver mine built by Harmony Gold from South Africa over 2006 to mid-2009, with Newcrest from Australia buying into the project in mid-2008 to form the Morobe Mining Joint Venture or ‘MMJV’ (shared 50-50%). The MMJV operates the Hidden Valley mine and all exploration work on MMJV tenements, which includes the large Wafi-Golpu copper-gold deposit.

== Demographics ==
The relative youth of the Morobe province population puts an increasing strain on schools and education services to combat illiteracy and its accompanying problems. Eight percent of the population (children) depend on twenty percent of the population (adults) for economic support, and population continues to grow at about 2.8 percent per year, which is higher than other developing countries.

== Languages ==
The population of Morobe speak over 100 languages, representing 27 language families. The majority of the indigenous Papuan languages of Morobe Province belong to the Finisterre-Huon branch of the Trans-New Guinea language family. During the 20th century, two well-studied local languages, Kâte and Yabem, were used for the purposes of evangelisation by the Lutheran Church, based in Finschhafen. In theory, Kâte was intended for use in the mountainous hinterlands, where Papuan languages are spoken, and Yabem in coastal and lowland areas, particularly along the coast and in the Markham Valley, where speakers of the Austronesian family of languages predominate. However, in some inland areas such as Wau, both Kâte and Yabem were introduced by mission groups coming from different directions. Today, English, and especially Pidgin English, are the common urban languages in Lae.

== Government ==
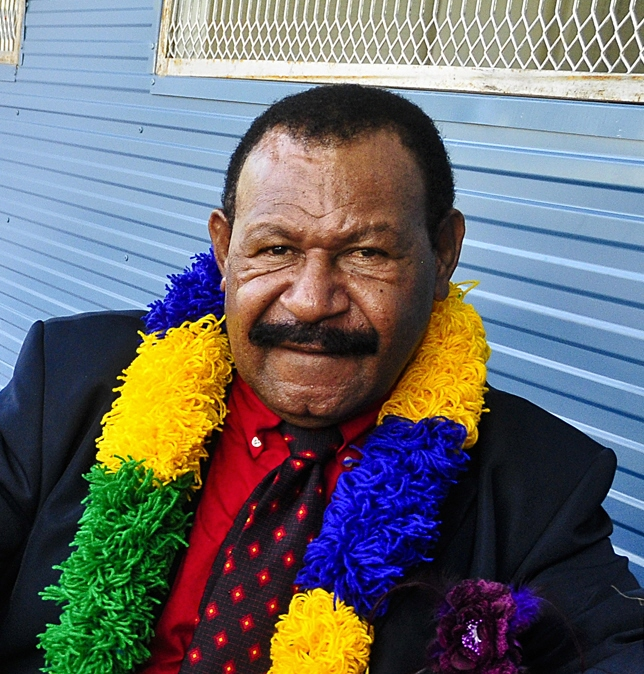
Morobe Governor Luther Wenge in May 2011.

The Province sends nine members to the national parliament, and has 14 members of the Tutumang the provincial assembly. Tutumang means "the coming together," and the Province maintains that name for its assembly, as is permitted under the Organic Law on Provincial Government and Local Government. From the 2022 National Election the Morobe Governor was Luther Wenge.

=== Districts and LLGs ===
Each province in Papua New Guinea has one or more districts, and each district has one or more Local Level Government (LLG) areas. For census purposes, the LLG areas are subdivided into wards and those into census units.

District	District Capital	LLG Name
Wau-Waria District	Wau	Wau Rural
Wau-Waria District	Wau	Waria Rural
Wau-Waria District	Wau	Wau Urban
Bulolo District	Bulolo	Mumeng Rural
Bulolo District	Bulolo	Watut Rural
Bulolo District	Bulolo	Bulolo Urban
Bulolo District	Bulolo	Buang Rural
Finschhafen District	Gagidu	Hube Rural
Finschhafen District	Gagidu	Kotte Rural
Finschhafen District	Gagidu	Finschafen Urban
Finschhafen District	Gagidu	Yabim-Mape Rural
Finschhafen District	Gagidu	Burum-Kwat Rural
Huon District	Salamaua	Morobe Rural
Huon District	Salamaua	Salamaua Rural
Huon District	Salamaua	Wampar Rural
Kabwum District	Kabwum	Deyamos Rural
Kabwum District	Kabwum	Komba Rural (Seko)
Kabwum District	Kabwum	Yus Rural
Kabwum District	Kabwum	Selepet Rural
Lae District	Lae	Ahi Rural
Lae District	Lae	Lae Urban
Markham District	Kaiapit	Onga-Waffa Rural
Markham District	Kaiapit	Umi-Atzera Rural
Markham District	Kaiapit	Wantoat-Leron Rural
Menyamya District	Menyamya	Kapao Rural
Menyamya District	Menyamya	Nanima Kariba Rural
Menyamya District	Menyamya	Kome Rural
Menyamya District	Menyamya	Wapi Rural
Nawae District	Boana	Labuta Rural
Nawae District	Boana	Nabak Rural
Nawae District	Boana	Wain-Erap Rural
Tewae-Siassi District	Wasu	Sialum Rural
Tewae-Siassi District	Wasu	Siassi Rural
Tewae-Siassi District	Wasu	Wasu Rural

=== Provincial leaders ===
The province was governed by a decentralised provincial administration, headed by a Premier, from 1978 to 1995. Following reforms taking effect that year, the national government reassumed some powers, and the role of Premier was replaced by a position of Governor, to be held by the winner of the province-wide seat in the National Parliament of Papua New Guinea.

==== Premiers (1978–1995) ====
Premier	Term
Pama Anio	1978–1980
Utula Samana	1980–1987
Enny Moaitz	1987–1988
Haggai Joshua	1988–1989
provincial government suspended	1989–1990
Jerry Nalau	1991–1992
Titi Christian	1992
provincial government suspended	1992–1994
Titi Christian	1994–1995

==== Governors (1995–present) ====
Governor	Term
Jerry Nalau	1995–2002
Luther Wenge	2002–2012
Kelly Naru	2012–2017
Ginson Saonu	2017–2022
Luther Wenge	2022–2025

=== Members of the National Parliament ===
The province and each district is represented by a Member of the National Parliament. There is one provincial electorate and each district is an open electorate.

Electorate	Member
Morobe Provincial	Luther Wenge
Bulolo Open	Sam Basil Jnr.
Finschhafen Open	Renbo Paita
Huon Gulf Open	Jason Peter
Kabwum Open	Patrick Basa
Lae Open	John Rosso
Markham Open	Koni Iguan
Menyamya Open	Solen Loifa
Nawae Open	Theo Pelgens
Tewae-Siassi Open	Dr. Kobby Bomareo

== See also ==
- Culture of Papua New Guinea
- Geography of Papua New Guinea
