= Kala language =

Language

Kala
- Kela
- Native to: Papua New Guinea
- Region: Huon District, Morobe Province: Salamaua Rural LLG and Morobe Rural LLG
- Native speakers: 2,200 (2011)
- Language family: Austronesian: Malayo-Polynesian; Oceanic; Western Oceanic; North New Guinea ?; Ngero–Vitiaz ?; Huon Gulf; North Huon Gulf; Kala

Language codes
- ISO 639-3: kcl
- Glottolog: kela1255

Kala, also known as Kela, is an Austronesian language spoken by about 2200 people (in 2002) in several villages along the south coast of the Huon Gulf between Salamaua Peninsula and the Paiawa River, Morobe Province, Papua New Guinea.

== Overview ==
The principal villages from north to south are:

- Salamaua Rural LLG
  - Manindala (also known as Kela) (7.054005°S 147.037474°E)
  - Lambu (also known as Logui) (7.058285°S 147.047338°E)
  - Apoze (also known as Laukanu) (7.126517°S 147.05715°E)
  - Kamiali (also known as Lababia) (7.291278°S 147.123617°E)
- Morobe Rural LLG
  - Alẽso (also known as Buso) (7.409564°S 147.168151°E)
  - Kui (7.494581°S 147.217669°E)

There are four dialects of Kala. The three southern villages share a dialect with very minor differences found in the village of Kui while each of the northern villages has its own dialect.

Linguistically, Kala belongs to the North Huon Gulf languages and Kala-speakers appear to have arrived on the southern coast of the Gulf relatively recently, beginning perhaps as late as the 17th century (Bradshaw 1997).

== Phonology ==
Kala has five basic vowels (listed below), as well as contrastive nasal vowels.

	Front	Central	Back
High	i ĩ		u ũ
High-mid	e ẽ		o õ
Low		a ã	

The consonants of Kala are listed below.

	Bilabial	Alveolar	Palatal	Velar
Plosive	p b	t d		k g
Fricative		s (z)		
Nasal	m	n		ŋ
Approximant	w		j	
Tap/flap		ɾ		

The voiced alveolar fricative [z] only exists in the dialects spoken in Apoze and Lambu villages.

In 2010, anthropologists from the University of British Columbia, Okanagan campus, worked in a collaborative project with the Kala Language Committee, a group of individuals concerned with strengthening Kala language amongst their communities, to decide on a Kala orthographic system. The practical writing system for Kala includes the following letters: ⟨a, ã, b, d, e, ẽ, g, i, ĩ, k, l, m, n, ŋ, o, õ, p, s, t, u, ũ, w, y, z⟩. The committee chose the tilde symbol to represent nasal vowels in their practical writing system as it reminded them of ocean waves (called titi in Kala) since they are coastal people.

== Morphology ==
=== Names ===
Like most of the languages around the Huon Gulf, Kala has a system of birth order names (Holzknecht 1989: 43-45, Devolder et al 2012). Each dialect has their own terms for birth-order names. Compare Numbami.

Birth order Southern Dialect	Sons	Daughters
1	Alisa	Kale
2	Aniya (Kamiali, Alẽso) Aniã (Kui)	Aiga
3	Gwe	Aya (Kamiali, Kui) Aiya (Alẽso)
4	Aluŋ (Kamiali, Alẽso) Alũ (Kui)	Dã
5	Sele	Auya (Kamiali) Owiya (Alẽso, Kui)
6	Dai (Kamiali, Alẽso) Dei (Kui)	Samba Uya (Kamiali, Kui) Dei (Alẽso)
7	Samba	Daliya (Kamiali, Kui) Samba Uya (Alẽso)
8		Deliya (Alẽso)

Birth order Northern Villages	Sons	Daughters
1	Alisa (Apoze) Asa (Lambu) Asap (Manindala)	Kale (Apoze) Kali (Lambu, Manindala)
2	Aniya (Lambu, Manindala) Aniã (Apoze)	Aiga (Apoze, Manindala) Aiza (Lambu)
3	Gwe (Apoze, Manindala) Gwae (Lambu)	Aya (Apoze, Lambu) Aiya (Manindala)
4	Aluŋ	Dã (Apoze, Lambu) Dam (Manindala)
5	Sele	Wouya (Apoze) Obiye (Lambu) Aobiye (Manindala)
6	Dai (Lambu, Manindala) Dei (Apoze)	Dei (Apoze) Dambiye (Lambu) Damiye (Manindala)
7	Asemba (Apoze) Ŋsemba (Lambu)	Asemba (Apoze) Ŋazizi (Lambu) Daiye (Manindala)
8		Ŋa zalia (Apoze)

== Dialects ==
Kala is spoken in six villages along the Huon Gulf, and as such is split into different dialects. The most significant differences, which are phonological and lexical, exist between the northernmost three villages and the southernmost, however, differences also exist between the individual villages, especially for Manindala (Kela) in the north. This dialect contains syllable codas, which no other dialect shows.

busambu 'sandfly' (Apoze, Kamiali, Alẽso, Kui)

busamu 'sandfly' (Lambu)

busamuk 'sandfly' (Manindala)

ambe 'yam' (Apoze, Kamiali, Alẽso, Kui)

ame 'yam' (Lambu)

amek 'yam' (Manindala)

mbua 'snake' (Lambu, Alẽso, Kamiali, Kui)
mua 'snake' (Apoze)

mowak 'snake' (Manindala)

do 'turtle' (Kamiali, Alẽso, Kui)
zo 'turtle' (Apoze)
za 'turtle' (Lambu)
sa 'turtle' (Manindala)
