= Iwal language =

Austronesian language

Iwal
- Kaiwa
- Native to: Papua New Guinea
- Region: Morobe Province
- Native speakers: 2,100 (2011)
- Language family: Austronesian: Malayo-Polynesian; Oceanic; Western Oceanic; North New Guinea ?; Ngero–Vitiaz ?; Huon Gulf; South Huon Gulf; Iwal

Language codes
- ISO 639-3: kbm
- Glottolog: iwal1237

Iwal (also called Kaiwa from Jabêm Kai Iwac "Iwac highlanders") is an Austronesian language spoken by about 1,900 people from nine villages in Morobe Province, Papua New Guinea (Cobb & Wroge 1990). Although it appears most closely related to the South Huon Gulf languages, it is the most conservative member of its subgroup.

== Name ==
The term Iwal is an endonym. Cognates in other related languages include Yabem Iwac and Numbami Yuwala.

== Phonology ==
Iwal distinguishes 5 vowels and 16 consonants. Unlike most of its neighboring languages, it distinguishes the lateral /l/ from the trill /r/, the latter derived from earlier *s, as in aru from Proto-Oceanic (POc) *qasu 'smoke', ruru- from POc *susu 'breast', and ur from POc *qusan 'rain'. Otherwise it appears to be the most phonologically conservative language in the South Huon Gulf chain (see Ross 1988:154–160). It has retained POc *t as /t/ (not /l/ or /y/) and POc *mw as /mw/ (not /my/ or /ny/), as in mwat 'snake' from POc *mwata.

=== Vowels ===
	Front	Central	Back
High	i		u
Mid	e		o
Low		a	

=== Consonants ===
	Bilabial	Alveolar	Palatal	Dorsal
Voiceless stop	p	t		k
Voiced stop	b	d		ɡ
Nasal	m	n		ŋ
Fricative	β	s		(χ)
Lateral		l		
Rhotic		r		
Approximant	w		j	

[χ] is only heard in word-medial position.

== Morphology ==
=== Pronouns and person markers ===
==== Free pronouns ====
Person	Singular	Plural	Dual	Paucal
1st person inclusive		eitit	tutlu	totol
1st person exclusive	ayeu ~ au	amei	eilu	eitol
2nd person	mie	yem	yemlu	yemtol
3rd person	ei	eisir	sulu	sotol

==== Genitive pronouns ====
Person	Singular	Plural
1st person inclusive		a-nd
1st person exclusive	a-ngg	a-meimei
2nd person	a-m	a-im
3rd person	a-ne	a-s

==== Possessive suffixes ====
Person	Singular	Plural
1st person inclusive		-(a)nd
1st person exclusive	-(a)ngg	-(a)nggamei
2nd person	-m (-am > -em)	-(a)nggaim
3rd person	-Ø (-a > -e)	-s

=== Deictics ===
Iwal deictics correlate with first, second, and third person, each of which has a long and a short form. The latter appear to be anaphoric in usage. Deictics also serve to bracket relative clauses: ete/ebe ... ok/nok/nik. By far the most common brackets are ebe ... ok, but if the information in the clause is associated with either speaker or addressee, the brackets are likely to be ete ... nik or ete ... nok. Deictics may occur either in place of nouns or postposed to nouns, as in nalk etok 'that earth/soil'.

- ete(n)ik, nik 'near speaker'
- ete(n)ok, nok 'near addressee'
- et(e)ok/eb(e)ok, ok 'away from speaker or addressee'

=== Numerals ===
Traditional Iwal counting practices started with the digits of the left hand, then continued on the right hand, and then the feet to reach '20', which translates as 'one person'. Higher numbers are multiples of 'one person'. Nowadays, most counting above '5' is done in Tok Pisin; in the Iwal New Testament, all numbers above '5'—except bage isgabu '10'—are written with Arabic numerals and most likely read in Tok Pisin.

Numeral	Term	Gloss
1	dongke/ti	'one'
2	ailu	'two'
3	aitol	'three'
4	aivat	'four'
5	bage tavlu	'hands half/part'
6	bage tavlu ano dongke	'hands half right one'
7	bage tavlu ano ailu	'hands half right two'
8	bage tavlu ano aitol	'hands half right three'
9	bage tavlu ano aivat	'hands half right four'
10	bage isgabu	'hands both/pair'
15	bage isgabu be va tavlu	'hands both and feet half'
20	buni amol ti	'[?] person one'
100	buni amol bage tavlu	'[?] person hands half [= '5']'

=== Bioclassifying prefixes ===
One unusual feature of Iwal is a small set of bioclassifying prefixes: ei- (POc *kayu) for trees, wer- for edible greens, man(k)- (POc *manuk) for birds, ih- (POc *ikan) for fish.

- eivovo 'canoe, canoe tree'
- eiweiwei 'mango tree' (POc *waiwai)
- weru 'two-leaf (Tok Pisin tulip), Gnetum gnemon, a tree with paired edible leaves'
- weryambum 'cabbage'
- mankbubu 'pigeon' (POc *bune)
- mankaruel 'cassowary' (POc *kasuari)
- ihtangir 'Spanish mackerel' (Tok Pisin tangir)

== Syntax ==
=== Word order ===
The basic word order in Iwal is SVO, with (mostly) prepositions, preposed genitives, postposed adjectives and relative clauses. Relative clauses are marked at both ends, and so are some prepositional phrases. Negatives come at the ends of the clauses they negate. There is also a class of deverbal resultatives that follow the main verb (and its object, if any).

ei ni- tle eivovo butu
3SG FUT.3SG chop canoe down
'He'll chop down the canoe tree.'

wakas gi- sov nalk aplo gi- le ite
root 3SG descend earth inside 3SG go not
'The roots did not go deep into the ground.'

in- di gen ete ayeu ga- lgum nik
3PL see thing DEM 1SG 1SG do DEM
'They'll see the things I have done.'

=== Verb serialization ===
Verb serialization is very common in Iwal. Within a serial verb construction, all verbs must agree in tense and the perfective marker is itself a serialized verb. Negatives come at the ends of the clauses they negate.

ei ni- tle butu ni- le ni- tak ni- kwai
3SG FUT.3SG chop down FUT.3SG go FUT.3SG stay FUT.3SG finish
'He'll chop it down and it'll go and lie there.'

atob ei ni- mbweg ni- wei nalk ite
then 3SG FUT.3SG stay FUT.3SG be.on earth not
'Then he won't sit on the ground.'

gi- dugdug gi- sov gi- le gi- tak
3SG roll 3SG descend 3SG go 3SG stay
'It rolled on down until it stopped.'

== Note ==
The primary source for this article is Bradshaw (2001), whose copyright holder is Joel Bradshaw, whose contributions here are licensed under the GFDL.
