= Piu =

Piu or PIU may refer to:

== People with the name ==
- Alessandro Piu (born 1996), Italian footballer
- Francesco Piu (born 1981), Italian composer
- Mario Più (born 1965), Italian DJ
- Piu (Brazilian footballer) (born 1976), Fabrício Nogueira Nascimento

== Other uses ==
- Più, a tempo qualifier in music
- Piu language, of Papua New Guinea
- Pump It Up (video game series)
- PIU, IATA code for Cap. FAP Guillermo Concha Iberico International Airport
- Principles of Intelligent Urbanism

== See also ==
- Pius (disambiguation)
