= Bukawa language =

Austronesian language

Bukawa
- Native to: Papua New Guinea
- Region: Huon Gulf, Morobe Province
- Native speakers: 12,000 (2011)
- Language family: Austronesian: Malayo-Polynesian; Oceanic; Western Oceanic; North New Guinea ?; Ngero–Vitiaz ?; Huon Gulf; North Huon Gulf; Bukawa

Language codes
- ISO 639-3: buk
- Glottolog: buga1250
- ELP: Bugawac

Bukawa (also known as Bukaua, Kawac, Bugawac, Gawac) is an Austronesian language of Papua New Guinea.

== Overview ==
Bukawa is spoken by about 12,000 people (in 2011) on the coast of the Huon Gulf, Morobe Province, Papua New Guinea. The most common spelling of the name in both community and government usage is Bukawa (Eckermann 2007:1), even though it comes from the Yabem language, which served as a church and school lingua franca in the coastal areas around the Gulf for most of the 20th century. This ethnonym, which now designates Bukawa-speakers in general, derives from the name of a prominent village Bugawac (literally 'River Gawac', though no such river seems to exist) at Cape Arkona in the center of the north coast.

Ethnologue notes that 40% of Bukawa speakers are monolingual (or perhaps were in 1978). This claim is hard to credit unless one discounts both Tok Pisin, the national language of Papua New Guinea, and Yabem, the local Lutheran mission lingua franca. The anthropologist Ian Hogbin, who did fieldwork in the large Bukawa-speaking village of Busama on the south coast shortly after World War II, found that everyone was multilingual in three languages: Tok Pisin, Yabem, and their village language (Hogbin 1951).

== Dialects ==
There are four dialects. Geographical coordinates are also provided for each village.

- Central-Western dialect: Buhalu (6.685885°S 147.261538°E), Cape Arkona (7.39985°S 146.159887°E), Hec (6.738776°S 147.492307°E), Tikeleng (6.686364°S 147.094457°E), Wideru (6.727518°S 147.454924°E) villages
- Eastern dialect: Bukawasip (6.696392°S 147.665307°E), Ulugidu villages
- South-Western dialect: Asini (7.027269°S 147.004275°E), Busamang (6.98127°S 146.97374°E; 6.98127°S 146.97374°E) villages
- Western dialect: Lae city villages

== Phonology ==
=== Vowels ===
Bukawa distinguishes the eight vowel qualities:

	Front		Central	Back
High	i			u
Lower high	ɪ			ʊ
Mid	e	ø		ɔ ~ o
Low			a	

- /ɔ/ is heard as [o] when occurring in word-final position.

=== Consonants ===
Bukawa has the largest consonant inventory among the Austronesian languages of mainland New Guinea.

Glottal stop, written with a c as in Yabem, is only distinctive at the end of syllables. The only other consonants that can occur syllable-finally are labials and nasals: p, b, m, ŋ. Syllable-structure constraints are most easily explained if labialized and prenasalized consonants are considered unit phonemes rather than clusters. The distinction between voiced and voiceless laterals and approximants is unusual for Huon Gulf languages.

		Bilabial		Coronal		Velar		Glottal
		plain	lab.	plain	lab.	plain	lab.	Glottal
Plosive	voiceless/asp.	p~pʰ	pʷ	tʰ		kʰ	kʷ	ʔ
Plosive	prenasal vl.	ᵐp	ᵐpʷ	ⁿt		ᵑk	ᵑkʷ	
Plosive	voiced	b	bʷ	d	dʷ	ɡ	ɡʷ	
Plosive	prenasal vd.	ᵐb	ᵐbʷ	ⁿd		ᵑɡ	ᵑɡʷ	
Nasal		m	mʷ	n		ŋ		
Fricative				s				h
Tap				(ɾ)				
Lateral	voiced			l				
Lateral	voiceless			l̥				
Semivowel	voiced	w		j				
Semivowel	voiceless	w̥		j̊				

- All voiceless plosives are phonemically written as /p, t, k/; however, they always are heard as aspirated [pʰ, tʰ, kʰ], with the exception of /p/ being heard as unaspirated [p] in word-final position.
- /l/ is heard as a tap [ɾ] in free variation among different speakers, but is most commonly heard as phonemic [l].

=== Tone contrasts ===
Vowels are further distinguished by high or low pitch. The latter is marked orthographically by a grave accent. These distinctions in tone are thus based on register tone, not contour tone as in Mandarin Chinese. Register tone contrasts are a relatively recent innovation of the North Huon Gulf languages. While tone is somewhat predictable in Yabem, where low tone correlates with voiced obstruents and high tone with voiceless obstruents, Bukawa has lost that correlation. Nor does Bukawa tone correlate predictably with Yabem tone. Compare Yabem low-tone awê 'woman' and Bukawa high-tone awhê 'woman', both presumably from Proto-Oceanic (POc) *papine (or *tapine).

High	Low
akwa 'canoe side support'	akwà 'old'
atu 'offspring, baby' (POc *ñatu)	atù 'big'
dinaŋ 'my mother' (POc *tina)	dinàŋ 'that'
êŋgili 'stirs up'	êŋgilì 'steps over'
huc 'pig net'	hùc 'bear fruit'
mbac 'bird' (POc *manu)	mbàc 'to rub'
ŋasi 'jaw'	ŋasì 'fat'
puŋ 'press by hand'	pùŋ 'make flat by adze'
siŋ 'canoe sideboard'	sìŋ 'fight'
tam 'edible greens'	tàm 'dew'
tuŋ 'garden fence'	tùŋ 'cause pain'

=== Contrastive nasalization ===
Final syllables appear to show distinctive nasal contrasts. Anticipation of final nasal consonants causes final vowels to nasalize, even when the final nasal consonant is elided in actual speech. Anticipation of nonnasal codas on final syllables, on the other hand, has caused systematic stopping (postplosion) of syllable-initial nasals, creating a class of prenasalized voiced obstruents that correspond to simple nasals in Yabem, as in the final seven examples in the following table. (See Bradshaw 2010.)

Yabem	Bukawa	Gloss
eŋ	iŋ ~ ĩ	'he/she/it'
gamêŋ	gameŋ ~ gamẽ	'place'
ŋapaŋ	ŋapaŋ ~ ŋapã	'always'
moac	mboc	'snake'
nip	ndip	'coconut'
ŋac	ŋgac	'man'
anô	andô	'true'
samob	sambob	'all'
ŋa-kana	ŋa-ganda	'sweet'
ŋa-têmui	ŋa-dômbwi	'dirty'

== Morphology ==
=== Pronouns and person markers ===
==== Free pronouns ====
		Singular	Plural	Dual
1st person	exclusive	aö	alu	yac
1st person	inclusive		hêclu ~ yêclu	yac
2nd person		am	mac ~ mwac	amlu
3rd person		iŋ	ŋac	iŋlu ~ lu

==== Genitive pronouns ====
The short, underdifferentiated genitive forms are often disambiguated by adding the free pronoun in front.

		Singular	Plural	Dual
1st person	exclusive	(aö) neŋ ~ aneŋ	(yac) mba	(alu) mba
1st person	inclusive		(yac) neŋ	(hêclu) neŋ
2nd person		(am) nem	(mac) nem	(amlu) nem
3rd person		(iŋ) ndê	(ŋac) si	(iŋlu) si

=== Numerals ===
Traditional counting practices started with the digits of one hand, then continued on the other hand, and then the feet to reach twenty, which translates as 'one person'. Higher numbers are multiples of 'one person'. Nowadays, most counting above five is done in Tok Pisin. As in other Huon Gulf languages, the short form of the numeral 'one' functions as an indefinite article.

Numeral	Term	Gloss
1	tigeŋ/daŋ	'one'
2	lu	'two'
3	tö	'three'
4	hale	'four'
5	amaŋdaŋ/limdaŋ	'hand-one'
6	amaŋdaŋ ŋandô-tigeŋ	'hand-one fruit-one'
7	amaŋdaŋ ŋandô-lu	'hand-one fruit-two'
8	amaŋdaŋ ŋandô-tö	'hand-one fruit-three'
9	amaŋdaŋ ŋandô-hale	'hand-one fruit-four'
10	amaŋlu/sahuc	'hands-two / ten'
15	sahuc ŋa-lim	'ten its-five'
20	ŋgac sambuc daŋ	'man whole one'
60	ŋgac sambuc tö	'man whole three'

=== Names ===
Like most of the languages around the Huon Gulf, Bukawa has a system of birth-order names (Holzknecht 1989: 43-45). The seventh son is called "No Name": se-mba 'name-none'. Compare Numbami.

Birth order	Sons	Daughters
1	Aliŋsap	Gali'
2	Aliŋam	Ika
3	Aŋgua'	Ayap
4	Aluŋ	Dam
5	Dei	Hop
6	Selep	Dei
7	Semba	
