= Yamap language =

Oceanic language spoken in Papua New Guinea

Yamap
- Native to: Papua New Guinea
- Region: Morobe Province
- Native speakers: (1,600 cited 2000 census)
- Language family: Austronesian: Malayo-Polynesian; Oceanic; Western Oceanic; North New Guinea ?; Ngero–Vitiaz ?; Huon Gulf; South Huon Gulf; Hote–Buang; Hote; Yamap

Language codes
- ISO 639-3: ymp
- Glottolog: yama1260

Yamap is an Oceanic language in Morobe Province, Papua New Guinea.
