= Salamaua Rural LLG =

Local-level government in Papua New Guinea

- Location within Papua New Guinea
- Coordinates: 7.056984°S 147.048651°E
- Country: Papua New Guinea
- Province: Morobe Province
- Time zone: UTC+10 (AEST)

Salamaua Rural LLG is a local-level government (LLG) of Morobe Province, Papua New Guinea.

== Wards ==
- 01. Hote
- 02. Yemly
- 03. Bobodum
- 04. Selebob
- 05. Kamiatam (Iwal language speakers)
- 06. Mubo (Iwal language speakers)
- 07. Lababia (Kala language speakers)
- 08. Salus (Iwal language speakers)
- 09. Buansing (Iwal language speakers)
- 10. Laukanu (Kala language and Iwal language speakers)
- 11. Laugui (Kala language and Iwal language speakers)
- 12. Keila (Kala language speakers)
- 13. Asini
- 14. Buakap
- 15. Lutu Busama
- 16. Awasa Busama
- 17. Wabubu
