= Mangga Buang language =

Language

Mangga
- Mangga Buang
- Native to: Papua New Guinea
- Region: Morobe Province
- Native speakers: 1,500 (2011)
- Language family: Austronesian: Malayo-Polynesian; Oceanic; Western Oceanic; North New Guinea ?; Ngero–Vitiaz ?; Huon Gulf; South Huon Gulf; Hote–Buang; Buang; Mangga

Language codes
- ISO 639-3: mmo
- Glottolog: mang1404

Mangga, or Mangga Buang, is an Oceanic language in Morobe Province, Papua New Guinea.

== Phonology ==
=== Consonants ===
	Bilabial	Alveolar	Alv.-pal.	Labio- velar	Uvular
Nasal	m	n	ɲ	ŋʷ	ɴ
(prenasalized) Occlusive	ᵐb	ⁿd		ᵑɡʷ	ᶰɢ
(prenasalized) Occlusive	p	t		kʷ	q
Affricate		ⁿdʒ			
Fricative	β	s			ʁ
Liquid	w	r	j		

=== Vowels ===
	Front	Central	Back
High	i		u
Mid	e		o
Low		a	
