= Hote language =

Oceanic language spoken in Papua New Guinea

Hote
- Malê
- Native to: Papua New Guinea
- Region: Morobe Province
- Native speakers: (2,300 cited 2000 census)
- Language family: Austronesian: Malayo-Polynesian; Oceanic; Western Oceanic; North New Guinea ?; Ngero–Vitiaz ?; Huon Gulf; South Huon Gulf; Hote–Buang; Hote–Yamap; Hote
- Dialects: Misim

Language codes
- ISO 639-3: hot
- Glottolog: hote1245

Hote (Ho’tei), also known as Malê, is an Oceanic language in Morobe Province, Papua New Guinea.

== Grammar ==
=== Stress Patterns ===
A. In words up to four syllables, the first syllable is primarily stressed with occasional exceptions.

Example:

1. 'damak "lightening"
2. 'dumloli "mountain"
3. du'viyaŋ "earthquake"

B. Four-syllable words, rare in the Hote language, have primary stress on the first syllable and secondary stress often on the third syllable. Some compound words have secondary stress on the fourth syllable.

Example:

1. 'kate'poli "potato"
2. 'kubaheŋ'vi "Friday"

=== Word Classes ===
Hote word classes include nouns, pronouns, verbs, modifiers, relators, location words, time words, demonstratives, and particles. Some words are members of several classes with no structural difference.

==== Nouns ====
1. Common Nouns: Most nouns in Hote are common nouns without inflection.
  1. Example:
    1. kamuŋ "jungle"
    2. ayuk "firewood"
    3. pik "ground"
    4. uniak "house"
2. Person Names: Hote names are typically nouns and modifiers that have been put together (compound nouns), or sometimes taken from the Jabem or Tok Pisin language.
  1. Example:
    1. malak "home" [male's name]
    2. kambaŋ "lime" [male's name]
3. Place Names: Place names in Hote are nouns that occur as subject only in an equative clause.
  1. Example:
    1. valantik (name of village)
    2. biyaŋai (name of village)
    3. bayuŋ "Bulolo"

==== Compound Nouns ====
1. Example:
    1. kubaheŋvi "Friday" [ku ("garden") baheŋvi ("five")]
    2. kuayova "Thursday" [ku ("garden") ayova ("four)]
    3. balaliŋ "playground" [ba ("ball") laliŋ ("imprint")]

==== Pronouns ====
Pronouns
		Singular	Dual	Plural
1.	inclusive exclusive	ya	alayi yayi	alalu yilu
2.		o	mau	molu
3.		yani~yeni	thayi	thilu

Pronouns are positioned as regular nouns but not used in descriptive nouns phrases, unless modified by a quantifier. Additionally, they are unable to be possessed.

1. Example:

yilu sapeŋ ana tamu skul

l.dl.exc all go down to school

"we (exc) all are going to the school."

Possessive Pronouns
		Singular	Dual	Plural
1.	inclusive	yanaŋ ~ yenaŋ	iniŋ	iniŋ ~ aniŋ
	exclusive		iniŋ	iniŋ ~ aniŋ
2.		anim	unim	unim
3.		aneŋ	iniŋ	iniŋ

In the plural forms of both the inclusive and exclusive pronouns, 'aniŋ' is used over 'iniŋ' often by Hote villagers and by coastal dwellers.

1. Example:

yanaŋ sup "my cloth"

my cloth

anim avuŋ "your dog"

your dog

aneŋ kev "his shirt"

his shirt

6. Modifiers: Divided into four classes, these words modify nouns, adjectives, and verbs. Class one modifiers are adjectives used to modify nouns and pronouns. These words are found in descriptive noun phrases which indicate size, quality, color, etc. Class two modifiers are adverbs that indicate manner and aspect. Class three modifiers can modify both nouns and verbs, however, there is only one known word. Fourth class modifiers are intensifiers.

Class 1 Example:

daim "tall, long"

moma "dry"

ma "sharp"

lopali "wet"

thapuk "white"

doho "some"

sapeŋ "all"

tom "one"

Class 2 Example:

ketheŋ "quickly"

daŋ "completely"

katu "well"

loŋbu "again"

tibum "straight"

Class 3 Example:

kambom "bad, very."

Class 4 Example:

amuŋ "very"

na "very"

Location Words: Hote location words are often depicted by vertical and horizontal planes with the exception of kapo "inside" and yaiŋ "outside." The orientations are as follows:

Vertical:

vuliŋ on.top/overhead

vibiŋ "underneath"

vumak "underneath" (farther down)

Horizontal:

saka "over there" (nearest)

toka "over there" (near)

toku "over there" (far)

tuvulu "over there" (farthest)

Height:

daka up.there (near)

saku up.there (far)

daku up.there (farthest)

tamu down/down to (any distance)

Example:

hamu vibiŋ "It is underneath."

3s.is underneath

Manner Words: These words connect a clause to the following particle of the sentence.

Example:

entek "this"

aintek "this"

nena "that, called"

hatum "like, as"

ma yamalu hanaiŋ i aintek nena

and 3s. talk to them this that

"and her husband said this,. . ."

Prepositions: In Hote, prepositions connect phrases to clauses.

Example:

aniŋ "inside"

haviŋ "with"

imbiŋ "with"

lok "with, including"

ek "for, to, at"

hamu haviŋ talebu lo lambu

3s.stay with mother and father

"He stayed with his mother and father."

==== Time Words ====
Example:

vemam "later"

vem "a little while, a little time"

wakbok "yesterday"

sebok "before"

yamuŋ "tomorrow"

denaŋ "not yet"

==== Demonstratives ====
Example:

atu "this"

entek "this" (close to)

intu "that" (close to)

namalu yauna atu "This very small boy."

male.child small.very this

duviyaŋ entek "It is an earthquake."

=== Verbs ===
In the Hote language, verbs are divided into four classes depending on what consonant the word begins with and how the word is tensed, class 1, class 2, class 3, and class 4. Class 1 verbs indicate tense signaled by a change in the first consonant of the stem. Class 1 verbs changed to voiced stops before the person marker prefix are prenasalized. Class 2 verb stems are identified by a beginning consonant of either the voiced stop d or b. The initial stop is prenasalized before the person marker to create the potential tense. Class 3 verb stems begin with the voiced prenasalized stop ŋg. Class 4 verb stems encompass all that are marked for poetneial b use of potential tense person markers or tense markers.

Class 1 Verb Example:
Initial Stem Consonant		Examples		Meaning
Actual	Potential	Actual	Potential	
v	b	va	ba	"make"
l	d	loyeŋ	doyeŋ	"dance"
th	s	thik	sik	"wash"
h	g	hek	gek	"sleep"
y	g	ye	ge	"see"
w	g	wa	ga	"get, hold"

More Class 1 Verb Examples:

yaha-va "I made/ am making."

ls.make

ya-m-ba "I will make."

ls.pot.make

o-n-doyeŋ "You will dance."

2s.pot.dance

Class 2 Verb Examples:

yaha-dum "I worked/ am working."

1s.work

ya-n-dum "I will work."

1s.pot.work

i-n-dum "He will work."

3s.pot.work

Class 3 Verb Examples:

yaha-ŋgabom num "I am cooking food."

1s.cook food

ya-ŋgabom num "I will cook food."

1s.cook food

Class 4 Verb Examples:

yahu-mu "I am resting."

1s.rest

te ya-mu "I will rest."

pot 1s.rest

te i-tuŋ "He will find."

pot 3s.find

ha-tuŋ "He found."

3s.find

==== Person Markers ====
Actual Tense: verbs in action, completed, or habitual.

Actual Tense Person Markers
		Singular	Dual	Plural
1.	inclusive exclusive	yaha-	a- a-	na-/a- na/a-
2.		ho-/o-/hu-/u-	o-/u-	no-/o-/u-/nu-
3.		ha-/e-/i-	e-/i-	ni-/i/ne-/e-

Potential Tense: verbs that have not yet taken place but will.

Potential Tense Person Markers
		Singular	Dual	Plural
1.	inclusive exclusive	ya-	na- na-	na-/a- na-/a-
2.		nu-/u-/no-/o-	no-/o-/nu-	nu-/u-/no-
3.		e-/i-	ni-	ni-/ne-/e-

Example:

e-bi bok "They speared the pig."

3p.spear pig

ni-m-bi bok "They will spear the pig."

3p.pot.spear pig

ho-yuv "You blew/are blowing."

u-yuv "You will blow."

Reduplication: Complete reduplication of numerals signals distribution whereas complete reduplication of quantities signals an increase in quantity. However, reduplication is uncommon in the Hote language.

Reduplication Rule:
+Head_{1}	+Head_{2}
numeral	numeral
quantity	quantity

Example:

tom "one"

tom tom "each one"

hawa numbeŋ numbeŋ "He gets very many."

3s.get plenty plenty

==== Counting System ====
The counting system of the Hote language is based on one man which utilizes seven different numerals as a base: 1,2,3,4,5,10, and 20. Numbers in between, (6-9, 11-19, 21+) are indicated by inclusion quantifiers (6-9), multiple quantifier phrases (11-19), and additional quantifier phrases (21+).

Basic Quantifier Phrase:
+Head	+Quantifier
baheŋ "hands"	vi "half"

Example:

baheŋ vi "five"

hands half

Inclusion Quantifier Phrase:
+Head A	± Conj	+Inclusion	+Head B
BQP	ba "and"	lahavu "including	numeral

Example:

baheŋ vi lahavu te "six"

hands half including one

baheŋ vi (ba) lahavu ayova "nine"

hands half and including four

Multiple Quantifier Phrase:
+Head A	±Conj	±Inclusion	±Head B
laumiŋ "ten"	ba "and"	la or lahavu "including"	numeral BQP IQP

Example:

laumiŋ ba lahavu te "eleven"

ten and including one

laumiŋ ba la baheŋ vi ba lahavu te "sixteen"

ten and including hands half and including one

Additional Quantifier Phrase:
+Head A	+Quantity	±Conj	±Inclusion	±Head B
buŋ "whole"	numeral BQP	ba "and"	la or lahavu "including"	numeral BQP IQP MQP

Example:

buŋ te "twenty"

whole one

buŋ te ba lahavu lu "twenty-three"

whole one and including three

buŋ te ba la laumiŋ "thirty"

whole one and including ten

buŋ te ba la laumiŋ ba lahavu te "thirty-one"

whole one and including ten and including one

== Phonology ==
=== Consonants ===
Chart of Consonants:
		Bilabial	Alveolar	Velar
Stops	Voiceless Voiced	p [p] b [b]	t [t] d [d]	k [k] [ʔ] g [g] [g ~ dž] [g ~ g^{y} ~ dž]
Fricatives	Voiceless Voiced	~~b~~ [~~p~~] [~~b~~]	s [s] ~~d~~ [~~0~~] [~~d~~]	x [~~g~~] [x]
Laterals			l [l]	
Nasals		m [m]	n [n]	n [ŋ]

Prenasalization: In the Hote language, all voiced prenasalized stops occur in medial position across syllable boundaries in nouns and verbs, except for [ŋg] which occurs word initial. Other exceptions include the following: [mb] can occur in compounds, [g] can occur in the initial position of loan words, and names, and [ŋg] can occur word initial before a low vowel.

[mb] Examples:

Verb

[ ' i . bi . tak ] / i-bitak/ "they came up"

[ ' im . bi . tak ] /im-bitak/ "he will come up"

Nouns

[ ' ko . bɔm ] /kobom/ "custom"

[kam . ' bɔm] /kam ' bom/ "bad"

[ ' ka . bɛŋ ] /kabeŋ/ "famine"

[ ' mam . be^ŋ ] /mambeiŋ] "play"

Coumpound

[ ' no^m . ' be^ŋ ] /noum-beiŋ/ "plenty"

[ ' dʊm . ' be^ŋ ] /dum-beiŋ/ "a large group"

[nd] Examples:

Verb

[ ' i . dʊm ] /i-dum/ "they work"

[ ' in . dʊm ] /in-dum/ "he will work"

Noun

[ ' o^ . do^ŋ ] /oudouŋ/ "source"

[ ' lɛŋ . ɔŋ . ' dɔŋ ] /lenondoŋ/ "his ear"

[ng] Examples:

Verb

[ ' ne . g^{y}a ] /ne . gia/ "they will carry"

[ ' ɛŋ . g^{y}a ] /eŋ . gia/ "he will carry"

Noun

[ ' li . giŋ ] /ligiŋ/ "sickness"

[ ' maŋ . gin ] /maŋgin/ "thorn"

Prenasalized Stops:
Phoneme	Allophone	Description	Occurrence	Example
/p/	[p]	voiceless unaspirated bilabial stop	word initial, between vowels, word final	[ ' pa . le^ ] /palei/ "a sore" [ ' lo . pa . li ] /lopali/ "wet"
/b/	[b]	voiced unaspirated bilabial stop	word initial and between vowels	[ ba . ' lam ] /ba'lam/ "sweet potato" [ ' la . ba ] /laba/ "plastic object"
/t/	[t]	voiceless unaspirated dental stop	word initial and between vowels or a vowel and a consonant	[ ' ta . to^ ] /tatou/ "a cough"
/d/	[d]	voiced dental stop	word initial and between vowels	[ ' da . ku ] /daku/ "up" [ ' na . ka . dʊŋ ] /nakaduŋ/ "small"
/k/	[k]	voiced unaspirated backed-velar stop	word initial, between vowels and between a vowel and a consonant, and word final	[ ' ka . pin ] /kapin/ "scissors" [ ' ua . ka . tik ] /uakatik/ "mother"
	[ʔ]	voiced glottal stop	between vowels and between a vowel and a consonant, and word final in variation with [k] during fast speech	[ ' uak . bo^k ] /uakbouk/ "yesterday" [ ' uaʔ . bo^ʔ ]
/g/	[g]	voiced backed-velar stop	word initial in names or loan words	[ ' lɔŋ . ga~~b~~u ] /loŋga~~b~~u/ "black" [ ga~~p~~ ] ~ [ dža~~p~~ ] ~ [ g^{y}a~~p~~ ] /ga~~b~~/ "plant with edible leaves" [ ' gi . gin ] ̃ [ ' dži . džiŋ ] /gigin/ "outside bone of ankle"
	[g ~ dž]	voiced backed-velar stop fluctuating with voiced alveopalatal affricate	preceding or following a high front vowel	[ ' lɔŋ . ga~~b~~u ] /loŋga~~b~~u/ "black" [ ga~~p~~ ] ~ [ dža~~p~~ ] ~ [ g^{y}a~~p~~ ] /ga~~b~~/ "plant with edible leaves" [ ' gi . gin ] ̃ [ ' dži . džiŋ ] /gigin/ "outside bone of ankle"
	[g ~ g^{y} ~ dž]	voiced backed-velar stop fluctuating with a voiced palatalized velar stop fluctuating with a voiced alveopalatal affricate	word initial and medial preceding a low vowel /a/.	[ ' lɔŋ . ga~~b~~u ] /loŋga~~b~~u/ "black" [ ga~~p~~ ] ~ [ dža~~p~~ ] ~ [ g^{y}a~~p~~ ] /ga~~b~~/ "plant with edible leaves" [ ' gi . gin ] ̃ [ ' dži . džiŋ ] /gigin/ "outside bone of ankle"

Fricatives:
Phoneme	Allophone	Description	Occurrence	Example
/~~b~~/	[~~p~~]	voiceless bilabial fricative	word final and in variation with [~~b~~] word initial	[ bo~~p~~ ] /bo~~b~~/ "limbum" [ ' ~~p~~a . lu ] /~~b~~alu/ "stone" [ ' ~~b~~a . lu ]
	[~~b~~]	voiced bilabial fricative	between vowels and in variation with the [~~p~~] word initial	[ bo~~p~~ ] /bo~~b~~/ "limbum" [ ' ~~p~~a . lu ] /~~b~~alu/ "stone" [ ' ~~b~~a . lu ]
/~~d~~/	[~~0~~]	voiceless interdental fricative	free variation with [~~d~~] word initial	[ ' ~~0~~a . la . lɛŋ ] /~~d~~alaleŋ/ "blood" [ ' ~~d~~a . la . lɛŋ ]
	[~~d~~]	voiced interdental fricative	between vowels and in variation with [~~0~~] word initial	[ ' ~~0~~a . la . lɛŋ ] /~~d~~alaleŋ/ "blood" [ ' ~~d~~a . la . lɛŋ ]
/x/	[~~g~~]	voiced backed-velar fricative	between vowels	[ ' la . ~~g~~a . le^ ] /laxalei/ "I cut" [ ' xa . de^ŋ ] /xadeŋ/ "on, to"
	[x]	voiceless backed-velar fricative	word initial	[ ' la . ~~g~~a . le^ ] /laxalei/ "I cut" [ ' xa . de^ŋ ] /xadeŋ/ "on, to"
/s/	[s]	voiceless fronted alveolar grooved fricative	word initial and between vowels	[ ' sa . ko^m ] /sakoum/ "corn" [ ka . ' sɛk ] /ka'sek/ "small"
/l/	[l]	voiced dental lateral	word initial and between vowels	[ ' lo . po . pɛk ] /lopopek/ "twins" [ ' la . ka . lɛk ] /lakalek/ "spider web"
/m/	[m]	voiced bilabial nasal	word initial, between vowels, and between a vowel and a consonant, and word final	[ ' ma . bʊŋ ] /mabuŋ/ "clean" [ ' kʊm . kʊm ] /kumkum/ "beads" [ ' ka . tim ] "cucumber" [ ' wa . ka . mik ] /ua.ka.mik/ "father"
/n/	[n]	voiced dental nasal	word initial and between vowels	[ ' na . ka . dʊŋ ] /nakaduŋ/ "small" [ ' a . nim ] /anim/ "yours"
/ŋ/	[ŋ]	voiced backed-velar nasal	word initial, between vowels, and word final	[ ŋaiŋ ] /ŋaiŋ/ "water" [ ' iɛŋ . a . liŋ ] /ieŋaliŋ/ "airplane" [ ' a . ne^ŋ ] /aneiŋ/ "his"

=== Vowels ===
Chart of Vowels:
	Front	Back
High	/i/ [i] [ɪ] [y] [y~ž]	/u/ [u] [ʋ]
Mid	/ei/ [e^]	/ou/ [o^]
Low	/e/ [ɛ] [e]	/o/ [o] [ɔ]
Low	/a/ [a]	

Vowels:
Phoneme	Allophone	Description	Occurrence	Example
/i/	[i]	Voiced high close front unrounded voicoid		[yap] /iap/ 'uncle' ['ɪn.tu] /intu/ 'that' ['i.naŋ] /inaŋ/ 'as if' ['bi.dɔŋ] /bidoŋ/ 'short' [bɪŋ] /biŋ/ 'knife' ['ku.~~y~~u] ~ ['ku.žu] /ku.iu/ 'Tuesday' [~~y~~u] ~ [žu] /iu/ 'two'
	[ɪ]	Voiced high open front unrounded vocoid	(Note: A close vowel is manifested as an open vowel when it occurs in closed syllables.)	[yap] /iap/ 'uncle' ['ɪn.tu] /intu/ 'that' ['i.naŋ] /inaŋ/ 'as if' ['bi.dɔŋ] /bidoŋ/ 'short' [bɪŋ] /biŋ/ 'knife' ['ku.~~y~~u] ~ ['ku.žu] /ku.iu/ 'Tuesday' [~~y~~u] ~ [žu] /iu/ 'two'
	[y]	Voiced alveo-palatal semi-vowel	occurs word initial but not preceding /u/ and word medial	[yap] /iap/ 'uncle' ['ɪn.tu] /intu/ 'that' ['i.naŋ] /inaŋ/ 'as if' ['bi.dɔŋ] /bidoŋ/ 'short' [bɪŋ] /biŋ/ 'knife' ['ku.~~y~~u] ~ ['ku.žu] /ku.iu/ 'Tuesday' [~~y~~u] ~ [žu] /iu/ 'two'
	[~~y~~ ~ ž]	Voiced alveolo-palatal flat fricative fluctuating with a voiced alveolo-palatal groved fricative	word initial preceding /u/	[yap] /iap/ 'uncle' ['ɪn.tu] /intu/ 'that' ['i.naŋ] /inaŋ/ 'as if' ['bi.dɔŋ] /bidoŋ/ 'short' [bɪŋ] /biŋ/ 'knife' ['ku.~~y~~u] ~ ['ku.žu] /ku.iu/ 'Tuesday' [~~y~~u] ~ [žu] /iu/ 'two'
/e/	[e]	Voiced mid close front unrounded vocoid which acts like a low vowel in vowel harmony		[ne.'daŋ.o^] /ne.daŋou/ 'they will listen' [ɛn.'daŋ.o^] /en'daŋou/ 'he will listen' ['ba.se.lak] /baselak/ 'bamboo strips' [ka.'sɛk] /ka'sek/ 'small' ['e^n.de^ŋ] /eindeiŋ/ 'to' ['ɛn.dɛŋ] /endeŋ/ 'until'
	[ɛ]	Voiced mid open front unrounded vocoid which acts like a low vowel in vowel harmony		[ne.'daŋ.o^] /ne.daŋou/ 'they will listen' [ɛn.'daŋ.o^] /en'daŋou/ 'he will listen' ['ba.se.lak] /baselak/ 'bamboo strips' [ka.'sɛk] /ka'sek/ 'small' ['e^n.de^ŋ] /eindeiŋ/ 'to' ['ɛn.dɛŋ] /endeŋ/ 'until'
/u/	[u]	Voiced high close back rounded vocoid		['u.nɪm] /unim/ 'yours' [ʋŋ] /uŋ/ 'saucepan' ['tu.ku] /tuku/ 'direction/ ['tʋk.tʋk] /tuktuk/ 'sticky'
	[ʋ]	Voiced high open back rounded vocoid		['u.nɪm] /unim/ 'yours' [ʋŋ] /uŋ/ 'saucepan' ['tu.ku] /tuku/ 'direction/ ['tʋk.tʋk] /tuktuk/ 'sticky'
/o/	[o]	Voiced mid close back rounded vocoid which acts like a low vowel in vowel harmony		['xa.lo^k] /xalouk/ 'he fell down' ['xa.lɔk] /xalok/ 'he drowned' ['xa.bo.bo] /xabobo/ 'close to' [bɔk] /bok/ 'pig' ['do.~~g~~o] /doxo/ 'some' ['dɔŋ.tɔm] /doŋtom/ 'one'
	[ɔ]	Voiced low close back rounded vocoid which acts like a low open vowel in vowel harmony		['xa.lo^k] /xalouk/ 'he fell down' ['xa.lɔk] /xalok/ 'he drowned' ['xa.bo.bo] /xabobo/ 'close to' [bɔk] /bok/ 'pig' ['do.~~g~~o] /doxo/ 'some' ['dɔŋ.tɔm] /doŋtom/ 'one'
/a/	[a]	Voiced low open central unrounded vocoid which is phonologically a front vowel because of vowel deletion processes	occurs word initial, medial, and final	['a.nʸo^] /aniou/ 'man' ['ŋa.ma] /ŋama/ 'death' ['ko.la] /kola/ 'fence'
/e͜i/	[e^]	Voiced slightly raised mid-high close front unrounded vocoid. It is higher than /e/ but lower than /i/ and contrasts with /e/. It acts like a high vowel in vowel harmony.	occurs word initial, medial, and final	[e^k] /e͜ik/ 'they sleep' [ɛk] /ek/ 'for, because' ['a.e^ŋ] /ae͜ing/ 'so, thus' ['sa.e^] /sae͜i/ 'a test/
/o͜u/	[o^]	Voiced slightly raised mid-high close back rounded vocoid. It is higher than /o/ but lower than /u/ and contrasts with /o/. It acts like a high vowel in vowel harmony.	occurs word initial, medial, and final	['o^.mo^] /o͜umo͜u/ 'you (sg) sit' [lo^] /lo͜u/ 'three' [lo] /lo/ 'and' ['mo^.lo^] /mo͜ulo͜u/ 'good friend' ['mo.lo] /molo/ 'drunk, foolish'
