= Mumeng language =

Language

Mumeng
- Native to: Papua New Guinea
- Region: Morobe Province
- Native speakers: (7,100 Kumalu, Zenag, Gorakor cited 1979); 1,700 Patep (2003), 350 Dambi (2000)
- Language family: Austronesian: Malayo-Polynesian; Oceanic; Western Oceanic; North New Guinea ?; Ngero–Vitiaz ?; Huon Gulf; South Huon Gulf; Hote–Buang; Buang; Mumeng

Language codes
- ISO 639-3: Variously: dac – Dambi ksl – Kumalu ptp – Patep (Ptep, Dengalu) zeg – Zenag (Zenang) goc – Gorakor
- Glottolog: mume1239
- ELP: Dengalu
- Mumeng is classified as Definitely Endangered by the UNESCO Atlas of the World's Languages in Danger.

Mumeng is a dialect chain of the Austronesian family in Morobe Province, Papua New Guinea. Dambi–Kumalu and Patep–Zenag–Gorakor have a degree of mutual intelligibility. Kapin may belong as well.

== Phonology ==
The following is of the Patep dialect:

=== Consonants ===
		Bilabial			Alveolar		Palatal	Back-velar		Glottal
		plain	pal.	lab.	plain	pal.	Palatal	plain	lab.	Glottal
Plosive	voiceless	p	pʲ	pʷ	t	tʲ		k̠	k̠ʷ	
Plosive	prenasal	ᵐb	ᵐbʲ	ᵐbʷ	ⁿd	ⁿdʲ		ᵑɡ̠	ᵑɡ̠ʷ	
Affricate					ⁿdz					
Fricative	voiceless				s					h
Fricative	voiced/pren.	β	βʲ		(ⁿz)			ɣ̠		
Nasal		m	mʲ	mʷ	n	nʲ		ŋ̠	ŋ̠ʷ	
Lateral					l					
Approximant		β̞					j			

- The prenasal affricate /ⁿdz/ may also fluctuate to a prenasal fricative [ⁿz] in free variation among speech.
- /ᵐb, ⁿd, ᵑɡ̠/ are heard as prenasal voiceless stops [ᵐp, ⁿt, ᵑk̠] when in word-final positions.
- /k̠/ is mostly heard as a glottal stop [ʔ] in word-final positions.
- /l/ may be heard as fricativized [l̝] or more fronted as [l̟] in word-final position.

=== Vowels ===
	Front	Central	Back
High	i		u
High-mid	e		o
Low-mid	ɛ		ɔ
Low		a	
