= South Huon Gulf languages =

South Huon Gulf
- Geographic distribution: Huon Gulf, Morobe Province, Papua New Guinea
- Linguistic classification: Austronesian: Malayo-Polynesian; Oceanic; Western Oceanic; North New Guinea; Huon Gulf; South Huon Gulf

Language codes
- Glottolog: sout2878

The South Huon Gulf languages are a linkage of the Huon Gulf languages of Papua New Guinea.

== Components ==
- Iwal (Kaiwa)
- Hote, Yamap
- Buang linkage: Mapos Buang, Mangga Buang, Piu, Kapin, Vehes, Mumeng (Dambi–Kumalu, Gorakor–Patep–Zenag)

The varieties of the Mumeng dialect chain are partially mutually intelligible.
