= North Huon Gulf languages =

Oceanic language group of Papua New Guinea

North Huon Gulf
- Geographic distribution: Huon Gulf, Morobe Province, Papua New Guinea
- Linguistic classification: Austronesian: Malayo-Polynesian; Oceanic; Western Oceanic; North New Guinea; Huon Gulf; North Huon Gulf
- Subdivisions: Bukawa; Yabem; Kela

Language codes
- ISO 639-3: –
- Glottolog: nort2858

The family of North Huon Gulf languages is a subgroup of the Huon Gulf languages of Papua New Guinea.

It consists of three languages, all of which are distinguished by severe truncation of many inherited roots and the compensatory development of suprasegmentals on vowels: phonemic tone in Yabem and Bukawa (Ross 1993) and nasalization in Kela (Johnson 1994).

== Languages ==
- Yabem
- Bukawa
- Kela
