= Sio language =

Austronesian language spoken in Papua New Guinea

Sio
- Native to: Papua New Guinea
- Region: Morobe Province
- Native speakers: (3,500 cited 1987)
- Language family: Austronesian: Malayo-Polynesian; Oceanic; Western Oceanic; North New Guinea; Ngero–Vitiaz; Vitiaz; Sio

Language codes
- ISO 639-3: xsi
- Glottolog: sioo1240

Sio (also spelled Siâ) is an Austronesian language spoken by about 3,500 people on the north coast of the Huon Peninsula in Morobe Province, Papua New Guinea. According to Harding and Clark (1994), Sio speakers lived in a single village on a small offshore island until the Pacific War, after which they established four villages on the nearby coast: Lambutina, Basakalo, Laelo, and Balambu. Nambariwa, another coastal village a few miles to the east, is also Sio-speaking.

Michael Stolz (died 1931) of the German Lutheran Neuendettelsauer Mission arrived in 1910, and Sio villagers converted en masse in 1919. "Since then the Sio have produced many Lutheran evangelists, lay mission workers, teachers, and churchmen" (Harding and Clark 1994: 31). However, the Sio villages were assigned to the mostly Papuan Kâte language circuit, rather than to the mostly Austronesian Jabêm language circuit. The first Sio orthography was based on that of Kâte, and was used in the publication in 1953 of Miti Kanaŋo, a book containing Bible stories, Luther's Small Catechism, and 160 hymns, all in the Sio language. Stolz was the principal translator, although many of the hymns were composed by native speakers of Sio, and the whole volume was edited by L. Wagner, Stolz's successor.

== Phonology ==
=== Vowels ===
The low back vowel is pronounced [ɔ]. All vowels vary in length, but length is rarely contrastive. Monosyllabic nouns and adjectives tend to be lengthened more than monosyllabic verbs, adverbs, or prepositions. Word stress generally falls on the penultimate syllable.

	Front	Back
High	i	u
Mid	e	o
Low	a	ɔ

=== Consonants ===
When Stephen and Dawn Clark of SIL International began to work with Sio speakers in 1985, the latter expressed a desire to revise their orthography to make it more similar to what people had become familiar with in Tok Pisin and English. The eventual results are tabulated in the following chart. The community at first resisted writing the labialized consonants as digraphs, since they clearly regarded them as unit phonemes. They insisted on writing the labialization as superscripts rather than as separate segments. However, by 1992, after many materials were produced in the new orthography, Sio teachers and church circuit officers approved writing the indicator of labialization on the same line, thus accepting mw instead of mʷ (Clark 1993).

	Bilabial		Dental	Alveopalatal	Velar
Voiceless	p	pʷ	t		k
Voiced	b	bʷ	d	dʒ	ɡ
Prenasalized	ᵐb	ᵐbʷ	ⁿd	ⁿdʒ	ᵑɡ
Nasal	m	mʷ	n		ŋ
Fricative	β			s	
Liquid			l / r		
Approximant	w			j	

The first orthography of Sio was devised by the missionary Michael Stolz, based on that of the Kâte language, which the German Lutheran mission used as a church and school lingua franca among speakers of Papuan languages. (Sio appears to have been assigned to the wrong language circuit.) The linguist Otto Dempwolff served as mentor and adviser to all the German missionaries in New Guinea on language questions. After Stolz died, Dempwolff analyzed his language materials and compiled a short sketch (1936). His analysis differs in several key respects from that of Clark (1993), who has had firsthand experience with the language. The most striking difference pertains to the labiovelars, which Dempwolff analyzed as coarticulated [k͡p], [ɡ͡b], [mɡ͡b], [ŋ͡m], but which Clark finds to be labialized labials (rounded on release) [pʷ], [bʷ], [mbʷ], [mʷ]. (The letter ɋ in the table below here stands for a curly q with hooked serifs that cannot properly be rendered online.) But Clark also found that g- [ɡ] and -c- [ɣ] were positional variants of the same phoneme; that trilled [r] is just a conditioned variant of flapped [ɾ]; and that the approximants are conditioned variants of their corresponding vowels.

	Bilabial	Labiovelar	Dental	Alveopalatal	Velar
Voiceless	p	kp	t		k
Voiced	b	ɡb	d	dʒ	ɡ
Prenasalized	ᵐb	ᵑᵐɡb	ⁿd	ⁿdz- / -ⁿdʒ-	ᵑɡ
Nasal	m	ŋm	n		ŋ
Fricative	β			s	-ɣ-
Liquid			l / r		
Approximant	w			j	

== Morphology ==
=== Pronouns ===
==== Free pronouns ====
Person	Singular	Plural
1st person inclusive		kinda
1st person exclusive	naŋa	maka
2nd person	noko	miki
3rd person	i	kinzi
