= Vehes language =

Language

Vehes
- Native to: Papua New Guinea
- Region: Morobe Province
- Native speakers: (70 cited 2000)
- Language family: Austronesian: Malayo-Polynesian; Oceanic; Western Oceanic; North New Guinea ?; Ngero–Vitiaz ?; Huon Gulf; South Huon Gulf; Hote–Buang; Buang; Vehes

Language codes
- ISO 639-3: val
- Glottolog: vehe1237
- ELP: Vehes

Vehes is an Oceanic language in Morobe Province, Papua New Guinea.
