= Kapin language =

Oceanic language

Kapin
- Native to: Papua New Guinea
- Region: Morobe Province
- Native speakers: (2,400 cited 1979 census)
- Language family: Austronesian: Malayo-Polynesian; Oceanic; Western Oceanic; North New Guinea ?; Ngero–Vitiaz ?; Huon Gulf; South Huon Gulf; Hote–Buang; Buang; Kapin

Language codes
- ISO 639-3: tbx
- Glottolog: kapi1250

Kapin is an Oceanic language in Morobe Province, Papua New Guinea. It may be part of the Mumeng dialect chain.
