= Yabem language =

Oceanic language spoken in Papua New Guinea

Yabem
- Jabêm
- Native to: Papua New Guinea
- Region: Finschhafen District, Morobe Province
- Native speakers: (2,100 cited 1978)
- Language family: Austronesian: Malayo-Polynesian; Oceanic; Western Oceanic; North New Guinea ?; Ngero–Vitiaz ?; Huon Gulf; North Huon Gulf; Yabem

Language codes
- ISO 639-3: jae
- Glottolog: yabe1254

Yabem, or Jabêm, is an Austronesian language of Papua New Guinea.

== Overview ==
Yabem belongs to the division of the Melanesian languages spoken natively (in 1978) by about 2,000 people at Finschhafen, which is on the southern tip of the Huon Peninsula in Morobe Province, Papua New Guinea, despite historical evidence that shows that the language originated in the northern coast. However, Yabem was adopted as local lingua franca along with Kâte for evangelical and educational purposes by the German Lutheran missionaries who first arrived at Simbang, a Yabem-speaking village, in 1885. Yabem was the first language for which the missionaries created a writing system because it was the first language that they encountered when they arrived. They even created a school system to provide education for the Yabem community.

By 1939, it was spoken by as many as 15,000 people and understood by as many as 100,000 (Zahn 1940). In the decade after World War II, the mission's network of schools managed to educate 30,000 students by using Yabem as the medium of instruction (Streicher 1982). Although the usage of Yabem as a local lingua franca was replaced by Tok Pisin, which was used in informal everyday life, such as religious meetings and the workplace, and English, which was used in more formal institutions like education and government in the 1950s, Yabem remains one of the best-documented Austronesian languages, with extensive instructional and liturgical materials (including many original compositions, not just translations from German or English) as well as grammars and dictionaries. The government wanted an easier assimilation to Western culture and values and access to their superior educational resources and so English was the most efficient language of instruction.

Still, the transition from the usage of Kâte and Yabem, which are languages with local origins, to Tok Pisin and English, which are languages with foreign origins, affected the dynamic of the people and their view of language and the church somewhat negatively.

Yabem also shares a close relationship with the Kela and Bukawa languages. In fact, many people who speak Bukawa also speak Yabem.

Ethnologue classifies the language's status as "threatened." It may be spelled Jabêm, Jabem, Jabim, Yabim and is also known as Laulabu.

== Phonology ==
=== Vowels ===
Yabem distinguishes seven vowel qualities.

	Front	Central	Back
High	i		u
Upper mid	e ⟨ê⟩		o ⟨ô⟩
Lower mid	ɛ ⟨e⟩		ɔ ⟨o⟩
Low		a	

=== Consonants ===
The glottal stop, written with a -c, is distinctive only at the end of syllables. The only other consonants that can occur there are labials and nasals: p, b, m, ŋ. The liquid /l/ is realized as either a flap [ɾ] or a lateral [l]. Syllable-structure constraints are most easily explained if labialized and prenasalized consonants are considered to be unit phonemes rather than clusters. However, Otto Dempwolff, who greatly influenced the German missionary orthographies in New Guinea, apparently did not sanction labialized labials, preferring instead to signal rounding on labials by the presence of a round mid vowel (-o- or -ô-) between the labial consonant and the syllable nucleus, as in vs. ômôêŋ 'you'll come' vs. ômêŋ 'he'll come' or ômôa 'you'll dwell' vs. ômac 'you'll be sick' (Dempwolff 1939). (Compare the orthographies of Sio and Kâte.)

		Labial		Coronal	Dorsal		Glottal
		plain	lab.	Coronal	plain	lab.	Glottal
Nasal		m	mʷ	n	ŋ		
Plosive	voiceless	p	pʷ	t	k	kʷ	ʔ
Plosive	voiced	b	bʷ	d	ɡ	ɡʷ	
Plosive	prenasal	ᵐb	ᵐbʷ	ⁿd	ᵑɡ	ᵑɡʷ	
Fricative	voiceless			s			(h)
Fricative	prenasal			ⁿs			
Approximant				l	j	w	

=== Tone ===
Yabem has a simple system of register tone that distinguishes high-tone syllables from low-tone ones. In the standard orthography, high-tone syllables are unmarked, and the nuclei of low-tone syllables are marked with a grave accent, as in oc 'sun' vs. òc 'my foot' or uc 'breadfruit' vs. ùc 'hunting net'. Tone distinctions in Yabem appear to be of relatively recent origin (Bradshaw 1979) and still correlate strongly with obstruent voicing contrasts (but not in its closest relative, Bukawa). Only high tones occur in syllables with voiceless obstruents (p, t, k), and only low tone occurs in syllables with voiced obstruents (b, d, g). The fricative /s/ is voiced in low-tone syllables but voiceless in high-tone syllables. Other phonemes are neutral with respect to tone and so occur in both high-tone or low-tone environments.

== Lexical categories ==
Yabem has nouns, verbs, adjectives, pronouns and adverbs. Some categories, such as verbs and nouns, are distinguishable by the types of morphology that they are able to take.

Yabem nouns can take inalienable possessive suffixes, distinguishing person, number and inclusivity/exclusivity. Alienable possessives are indicated by a juxtaposed possessive word. Nouns can also take "affective" suffixes that indicate a speaker's attitude toward that thing: sympathy, affection or ridicule. Examples are from Bradshaw & Czobor (2005) unless otherwise stated:

- ŋac – 'man'

ŋac-èc
man-DIM
'dear little man'

gwad-êc
cousin-1SG.POSS
'my cousin'

gwad-êc-sìgo
cousin-1SG.POSS-RID
'my stupid cousin'

Verbs are distinguishable by their prefixes. They can take pronominal prefixes to indicate person, number, and irrealis/realis mode, as can be seen above in the Morphology section.

kê-poa
3SG-break
'it breaks'

Some words can function as either nouns or verbs and thus take either nominal or verbal morphology:

- lac – 'a sail'

ŋoc lac
1SG.POSS sail
'my sail'

ta-lac
1PL-sail
'we sail'

Most of these are derived from the sense of the noun originally, though some appear to be derived from actions expressed by verbs:

ta-ômac
1PL-laugh
'we laugh'

- ômac – 'laughter'

== Grammatical relations and alignment ==
Yabem has a nominative-accusative system of alignment, as is evidenced by the pronominal prefixes that appear on verbs that always mark the subject of either a transitive or intransitive verb. There is no case-marking on the nominals themselves, and word order is typically subject–verb–object (SVO). Examples are from Bradshaw & Czobor (2005:10-34) unless otherwise noted:

ga-sô tuŋ
1SG-tie fence
'I tied the fence'

ga-ŋgôŋ
1SG-sit
'I remain'

Subject prefixes can also occur with full subject pronouns, as is shown in the example below. Both bolded morphemes refer to the first-personal singular.

aê ga-ŋô aômnêm biŋ atom
1SG 1SG-hear 2SG.POSS talk NEG
'I didn't hear your speech'

Word order (SVO) is another marker of the nominative/accusative system. Below, the first person singular free pronoun precedes the first whether it is the subject of an intransitive verb or the agent of a transitive verb.

aê ga-jam
1SG 1SG-make.thanks
'I give thanks'

aê ge-no mo
1SG 1SG-cook taro
'I cook taro'

== Voice and valency ==
Yabem, like many other languages of the area, both Oceanic and Papuan, has no passive voice. There is also no morphological method to create a causative. Detransitivization can be accomplished via periphrastic reflexive/reciprocal phrases, as can be seen below. Example is from Bradshaw (1999:289-91).

ma sê-kic bing sê-wing taung
and 3PL-bind word 3PL-join selves
'and they planned together' (lit. 'They bound words and joined each other')

ma sê-sam taung se-be Sibôma
and 3PL-call selves 3PL-say Sibôma
'and they called themselves Sibôma'

== Morphological typology ==
Yabem shows elements of morphological fusion and agglutination but is not very high in either respect. The primary factor determinative of fusion/agglutination degree is lexical category. Verbs, for example, take subject prefixes, which fusionally mark person, number, inclusivity (for the first person plural), realis/irrealis, and high- and have low-tone variants. Nouns also display low levels of agglutination, sometimes taking possessive suffixes. Verbal derivation is not something that occurs morphologically although nominalization does so. Some derivational morphology for nominalization can be seen below in building a noun via the agentive suffix. In the second example, the patient of a verb (in this case -àwêwàga 'woman') is combined with the agent (here ŋac 'man') to construct an agentive nominalized form. Examples are from Bradshaw & Czobor (2005:30).

ge-job-wàga
3SG-guards-AGEN
'guardian'

ŋac-gebe-ênam-àwêwàga
man-3SG.wants-he.takes-woman
'bridegroom'

== Relative clauses ==
Relative clauses are created by use of the demonstrative pronouns/adjectives, which come in several forms themselves.

First series	tonec	onec	**tec**	**nec**
Second series	tonaŋ	onaŋ/ônaŋ	**taŋ**	**naŋ**
Third series	tone	ônê	**tê**	**nê**

The three series above represent three degrees of proximity in the demonstratives. First series correlates to something nearest or most relevant to the 1st person (the speaker), and the second series corresponded to the 2nd person (addressee), while the third series corresponds to what is nearest or most relevant to the 3rd person (non-speech act participant). The forms beginning with t- are those that offer a specific or precise degree of evidentiality (with regard to the referent). Examples of this degree of precision can be seen below.

ŋac tonec
man PROX
'this man (near me, whom I know)'

moc onec
bird PROX
'this bird (that I heard, but cannot point out now)'

sê-moa onaŋ
3PL-stay DIST
'they stay there (near you, but not visible)'

The bolded forms in the above table are the short forms of these demonstratives. They are phonologically reduced but carry no difference in meaning from the long forms. It is these short demonstratives that are used to create relative clauses. The three degrees of proximity as well as the two degrees of evidential precision still come into play when these forms are used as relative pronouns.

aê tec ga-moa amàc ŋa-sawa nec ka-tôm ŋac-gê-jam-sakiŋ-wàga
1SG tec 1SG-stay 2SG 3SG.POSS-middle nec 1SG-suffice man-3SG-do-service-AGEN
'I who dwell in your midst am also one who serves'

ô-sôm biŋ mo-wề-ŋa ê-ndêŋ àwê taŋ gê-ngôŋ malac
2SG.IRR-speak word taro-root-GEN 3SG-reach woman taŋ 3SG-sit village
'talk about taro shoots to the woman sitting in the village'

aêàc a-pi waŋ taŋ dêbu-c ke-to ŋa-lêsiŋ naŋ
1PL 1PL-ascend canoe taŋ grandfather-1SG.POSS 3SG-paint 3SG.POSS-sideboard naŋ
'we’ll board a canoe whose sideboards my grandfather painted'

It is of note that the t- pronoun may precede the n- form, or two n-/n- forms may co-occur, but the n- form may never precede the t- form. This means that taŋ...naŋ and naŋ...naŋ are acceptable but not *naŋ...taŋ.

== Serial verb constructions ==
Yabem has a rich serial verb construction system (SVC). It incorporates both different subject (switch-subject) SVCs and same subject SVCs. The SVC system is symmetrical. The two verbs of the SVC must agree in mode (realis/irrealis) and must have the same object if they are transitive. Semantic usages include directionals, resultatives, causatives, comitatives and adverbial modifiers:

sê-janda moc sê-moa gwêc
3PL-hunt bird 3PL-stay at.sea
'they hunted birds at sea'

sê-lac sê-na gwêc
3PL-sail 3PL-go at.sea
'they’ll sail out to sea'

ta-sêwa ŋop ê-nêc malaclùŋ
1PL.INCL-pour.out betel.lime 3SG.IRR-lie village.plaza
'we'll pour out the betel lime in the village plaza'

ka-siŋ i ga-wiŋ teo-c-àc
1SG-catch fish 1SG-accompany older.brother-1SG.POSS-COL
'I caught fish with my older brothers'

== Morphology ==
=== Pronouns and person markers ===
==== Free pronouns ====
First-person plural inclusive and exclusive are not distinguished in the free pronouns, but are distinguished in the subject prefixes and the genitives.

Person	Singular	Plural	Dual
1st person inclusive		aêàc	aêàgêc
1st person exclusive	aê	aêàc	aêàgêc
2nd person	aôm	amàc	amàgêc
3rd person	eŋ	êsêàc	êsêàgêc

==== Genitive pronouns ====
The short, underdifferentiated genitive forms are often disambiguated by adding the free pronoun in front.

Person	Singular	Plural
1st person inclusive		(aêàc) nêŋ
1st person exclusive	(aê) ŋoc	(aêàc) ma
2nd person	(aôm) nêm	(amàc) nêm
3rd person	(eŋ) nê	(êsêàc) nêŋ

==== Subject prefixes on verbs ====
Verbs are prefixed to show the person and number of their subjects. (The first-person plural exclusive and second-person plural prefixes are homophonous but can be disambiguated by using the free pronouns in subject position.) The singular prefixes also distinguish realis and irrealis mood (which usually translates to nonfuture vs. future tense). Each prefix also has a high-tone (H) and a low-tone (L) allomorph to meet the tone requirements of each of five conjugation classes.

Person	Singular Realis (H/L)	Singular Irrealis (H/L)	Plural Realis=Irrealis (H/L)
1st person inclusive			ta-/da-
1st person exclusive	ka-/ga-	ja-/jà-	a-/à-
2nd person	kô-/gô-	ô-/ô`-	a-/à-
3rd person	kê-/gê-	ê-/ê`-	sê-/sê`-

=== Possessed nouns ===
==== Alienable vs. inalienable possession ====
Preposed genitive pronouns are used to mark alienable possession by humans, as in ŋoc àndu 'my house', nêm i 'your fish', nê jàc 'his brother-in-law (wife's brother)'. Inalienable possession is marked by suffixes directly on the nouns denoting the possessions, which are typically kinship relations and body parts. The underdifferentiated suffixes are often disambiguated by adding the free pronoun in front of the suffixed noun. The final -i on the plurals of kin terms is a distributive marker, indicating some but not all of the class to which the noun refers.

'cross-cousin'	Singular	Plural
1st person inclusive		gwadêŋi
1st person exclusive	gwadêc	gwadêŋi
2nd person	gwadêm	gwadêmi
3rd person	gwadê	gwadêŋi

'body'	Singular	Plural
1st person inclusive		ôliŋ
1st person exclusive	ôlic	ôliŋ
2nd person	ôlim	ôlim
3rd person	ôli	ôliŋ

==== Inherent possession ====
Genitive relations for other than humans are not marked by either the genitive pronouns (for alienables) or the genitive suffixes (for inalienables). Instead, inherent possession of nouns as progeny or parts of wholes is marked by a prefix ŋa-, as in (ka) ŋalaka '(tree) branch', (lôm) ŋatau '(men's house) owner', and (talec) ŋalatu '(hen's) chick'. The same is true of adjectives (attributes of other entities) when derived from nouns, as in ŋadani 'thick, dense' (< dani 'thicket') or ŋalemoŋ 'muddy, soft' (< lemoŋ 'mud').

Other genitive constructions

Nouns denoting persons use a genitive suffix of -nê in the singular and -nêŋ.

Apômtau-nê intêna
lord-GEN his.way
'of the lord's way'

The plural version of the suffix is applied to plural nouns or singular nouns that are plural in meaning.

lau-nêŋ kôm
people-GEN field
'the people's field'

=== Compounds ===
Compound nouns are often composed of two parts, the first of which is the genitive of the second.

ja-dauŋ
fire-smoke
'smoke of a fire'

Sometimes the compounds are metaphorical in their meaning.

bu-mata
water-eye
'spring (of water)'

Some compounds include a possessive suffix on the first element of the compound.

môkê-c-lauŋ
head-1S.POSS-hair
'my head's hair' = 'my head hair'

lusô-m-sùŋ
nose-2S.POSS-hole
'your nose's hole' = 'your nostril'

Some elements of these body part compounds exist only within the compound.

bô-c-dagi
?-1S.POSS-chest
'my chest'

bô-n-dagi
?-2S.POSS-chest
'your chest'

tê-∅-tac
belly-3S.POSS-?
'his belly'

tê-n-tac
belly-2S.POSS-?
'your belly'

Less common are compounds that do not expression possessive, but some other kind of genitive relationship, such as apposition.

lau-sìŋ
people-sword/fight
lit. 'people of the sword' = 'warriors'

nom-ku
earth-pot
'clay for pots'

=== Numerals ===
Traditional counting practices started with the digits of one hand, then continued on the other hand, and then the feet to reach twenty, which translates as 'one person'. Higher numbers are multiples of 'one person'. Nowadays, most counting above five is done in Tok Pisin. As in other Huon Gulf languages, an alternate form of the numeral 'one' (teŋ) functions as an indefinite article. The numeral luagêc 'two' can similarly function as an indefinite plural indicating 'a couple, a few, some'. The numeral root ta 'one' suffixed with the adverbial marker -geŋ renders 'one, only one', while the numeral 'two' similarly suffixed (luàgêc-geŋ) renders 'only a few'. Reduplicated numerals form distributives: tageŋ-tageŋ 'one by one', têlêàc-têlêàc 'in threes', etc.

Numeral	Term	Gloss
1	ta(-geŋ) / teŋ	'one-ADV' / 'a(n)'
2	luàgêc	'two'
3	têlêàc	'three'
4	àclê	'four'
5	lemeŋ-teŋ	'hand-one'
6	lemeŋ-teŋ ŋanô ta	'hand-one fruit one'
7	lemeŋ-teŋ ŋanô luàgêc	'hand-one fruit two'
8	lemeŋ-teŋ ŋanô têlêàc	'hand-one fruit three'
9	lemeŋ-teŋ ŋanô àclê	'hand-one fruit four'
10	lemeŋ-lu ~ lemelu	'hands-two'
11	lemeŋ-lu ŋanô ta	'hands-two fruit one'
15	lemeŋ-lu ŋa-lemeŋ-teŋ	'hands-two its-hands-one'
20	ŋac teŋ	'man one'

== Vocabulary ==
Due to the limited amount of consonants and vowels in the Yabem language, pronunciation is critical in order to get the correct meaning across. In some cases, simply changing the accent on a letter can change the meaning of a word entirely.

Numeral	Meaning of word	IPA
1	'man'	ŋɑʔ
2	'your mother's brother'	sa-m <sa- 'mother's brother' + -m 'your (singular)'
3	'she/he ate'	g-ɛŋ < g (ɛ) - 'third person singular subject, realis'; -ɛŋ 'eat'
4	'possum'	moyaŋ
5	'your mother'	tena-m
6	'I spoke'	ka-som
7	'I walked'	ka-seleŋ
8	'he will carry'	e-toloŋ
9	'valuables'	awÁ
10	'(his/her) mouth'	awÀ
11	'outside'	awÉ
12	'woman'	awÈ
13	'body'	olÍ
14	'wages	olÌ
15	'prohibition'	yaÓ
16	'enmity'	yaÒ
17	'mango'	wÁ
18	'crocodile'	wÀ
19	'hammer (verb)'	-sÁʔ
20	to put on top of	-sÀʔ
21	'careless'	paliŋ
22	'far away'	baliŋ
23	'shell'	piŋ
24	'speech'	biŋ
25	'all at once'	tÍp
26	'thud'	dÌp
27	'service'	sakiŋ
28	'house partition'	sagiŋ
29	'I called out'	ka-kÚŋ
30	'I speared (something)'	ga-gÙŋ
31	'I provoked trouble'	ka-kilÍ
32	'I stepped over (s.t.)'	ka-gelÌ
33	'I dwelt'	ga-m"À

*Table taken from "Tonogeneis in the North Huon Gulf Chain" by Malcolm D. Ross

== Bibliography ==
- Bisang, Walter (1986). "Die Verb-Serialisierung im Jabêm." Lingua 70:131–162.
- Bradshaw, Joel (1979). "Obstruent harmony and tonogenesis in Jabêm." Lingua 49:189–205.
- Bradshaw, Joel (1983). "Dempwolff’s description of verb serialization in Yabem." In Amram Halim, Lois Carrington, and S. A. Wurm, eds., Papers from the Third International Conference on Austronesian Linguistics, vol. 4, Thematic variation, 177–198. Series C-77. Canberra: Pacific Linguistics.
- Bradshaw, Joel (1993). "Subject relationships within serial verb constructions in Numbami and Jabêm." Oceanic Linguistics 32:133–161.
- Bradshaw, Joel (1998). "Squib: Another look at velar lenition and tonogenesis in Jabêm." Oceanic Linguistics 37:178-181.
- Bradshaw, Joel (1999). "Null subjects, switch-reference, and serialization in Jabêm and Numbami." Oceanic Linguistics 38:270–296.
- Bradshaw, Joel (2001). "The elusive shape of the realis/irrealis distinction in Jabêm." In Joel Bradshaw and Kenneth L. Rehg, eds., Issues in Austronesian morphology: A focusschrift for Byron W. Bender, 75–85. Pacific Linguistics 519. Canberra: Pacific Linguistics. ISBN 0-85883-485-5
- Bradshaw, Joel, and Francisc Czobor (2005). Otto Dempwolff's grammar of the Jabêm language in New Guinea. Oceanic Linguistics Special Publication No. 32. Honolulu: University of Hawai‘i Press. ISBN 0-8248-2932-8
- Dempwolff, Otto (1939). Grammatik der Jabêm-Sprache auf Neuguinea. Abhandlungen aus dem Gebiet der Auslandskunde, vol. 50. Hamburg: Friederichsen de Gruyter.
- Ross, Malcolm (1993). "Tonogenesis in the North Huon Gulf chain." In Jerold A. Edmondson and Kenneth J. Gregerson, eds., Tonality in Austronesian languages, 133–153. Oceanic Linguistics Special Publication No. 24. Honolulu: University of Hawai‘i Press.
- Ross, Malcolm (2002). Jabêm. In John Lynch and Malcolm Ross and Terry Crowley (eds.), The Oceanic Languages, 270-296. Richmond: Curzon.
- Streicher, J. F. (1982). Jabêm–English dictionary. Series C-68. Canberra: Pacific Linguistics. (First compiled by Heinrich Zahn in 1917; later translated and revised by J. F. Streicher.)
- Zahn, Heinrich (1940). Lehrbuch der Jabêmsprache (Deutsch-Neuguinea). Zeitschrift für Eingeborenen-Sprache, Beiheft 21. Berlin: Reimer.
