= Piu language =

Oceanic language

Piu
- Native to: Papua New Guinea
- Region: Morobe Province
- Native speakers: (100 cited 2000)
- Language family: Austronesian: Malayo-Polynesian; Oceanic; Western Oceanic; North New Guinea ?; Ngero–Vitiaz ?; Huon Gulf; South Huon Gulf; Hote–Buang; Buang; Piu

Language codes
- ISO 639-3: pix
- Glottolog: piuu1237
- ELP: Piu
- Piu is classified as Definitely Endangered by the UNESCO Atlas of the World's Languages in Danger.

Piu is an Oceanic language in the upper Watut River area of Morobe Province, Papua New Guinea.
