= Morobe Rural LLG =

Local-level government in Papua New Guinea

- Location within Papua New Guinea
- Coordinates: 7.758592°S 147.594211°E
- Country: Papua New Guinea
- Province: Morobe Province
- Time zone: UTC+10 (AEST)

Morobe Rural LLG is a local-level government (LLG) of Morobe Province, Papua New Guinea.

== Wards ==
- 01. Kui (Kala language speakers)
- 02. Paiawa (Numbami language speakers)
- 03. Miama
- 04. Zinamba
- 05. Zigori
- 06. Amoa
- 07. Bosadi
- 08. Mou
- 09. Ana
- 10. Eware
- 11. Kobo
- 12. Eiya
- 13. Wuwu
- 14. Dona
- 15. Ainse
- 16. Zare
- 17. Siu
- 18. Popoe
- 19. Waiseduna
- 20. Bau
- 21. Morobe Station
- 22. Pema
