= Francesco Piu =

Italian composer, guitarist and singer (born 1981)

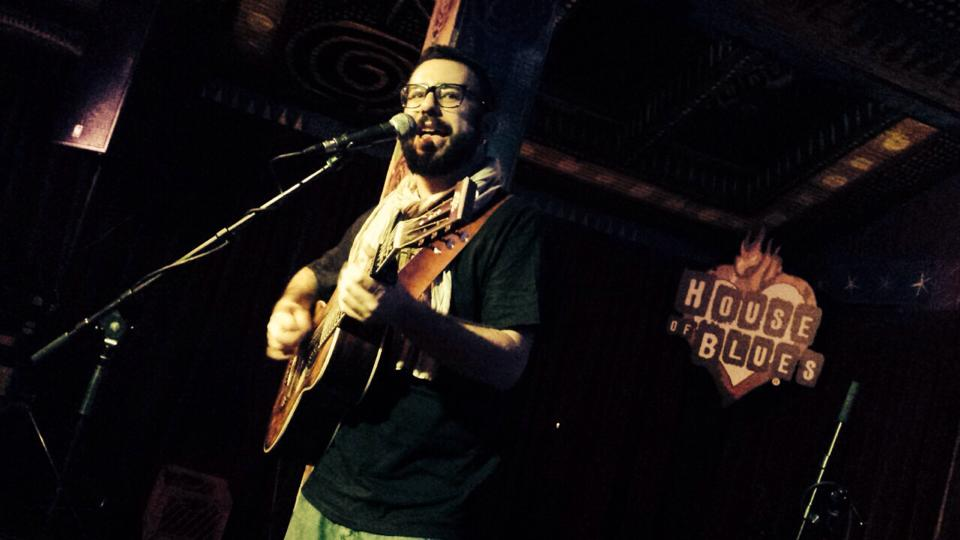
- Piu at the House of Blues, Los Angeles

Background information
- Born: 12 June 1981 (age 45); Osilo, Sassari, Italy
- Genres: Acoustic blues
- Occupations: Composer; vocalist
- Instruments: Vocals; guitar; dobro; weissenborn; banjo; washboard; harmonica
- Years active: 2003–present
- Label: Groove Company
- Website: francescopiu.com

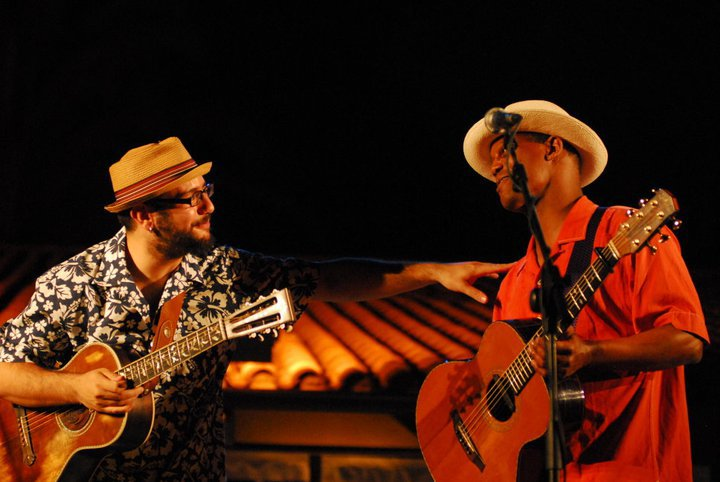
Francesco Piu and Eric Bibb on stage

Francesco Piu (born 12 June 1981) is an Italian composer, guitarist and singer.

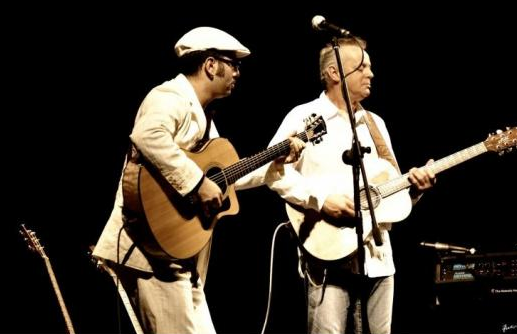
Piu and Tommy Emmanuel on stage

== Biography ==
Born and raised in Osilo, in Italy's Sardinia region, Piu began learning the guitar when he was nine years old thanks to his father, who was a bassist.

As an adult, he began playing with various rock-blues groups, and in 2003, he won the Blues for Sardinia contest at the Narcao Blues Festival with his first official group, Blujuice. The following year, he was the opening act for John Mayall at the festival and took up a solo career as a one-man band, playing the acoustic guitar, resonator guitar, banjo, weissenborn, washboard and harmonica.

His first musical repertoire featured acoustic covers of blues classics, as well as blues reinterpretations of rock classics by artists such as Neil Young and Jimi Hendrix. His covers also included elements of soul, funk and rock.

In 2007, he released his first album, Blues Journey, for the Groove Company. After the album came out, he participated in various Italian blues festivals, performing with Guy Davis, Roy Rogers, Kevin Welch, Andy J. Forest, Bob Stroger, Eugenio Finardi, Watermelon Slim and Eric Bibb. He was the opening act for Johnny Winter, Robben Ford, Joe Bonamassa, Charlie Musselwhite, Sonny Landreth, The Derek Trucks Band, The Fabulous Thunderbirds, Brent Mason, The Holmes Brothers, Junior Watson, John Németh and Otis Grand. That same year, he joined a group led by Davide Van de Sfroos, performing live and contributing to the album Yanez.

In 2008, Piu won an award at the Out of the Blue Festival in Samedan, Switzerland. The following year, he won an award at the Delta Blues Festival in Rovigo, Italy, in partnership with the International Blues Challenge held in Memphis, Tennessee. In November 2009, he performed with Australian musician Tommy Emmanuel at the Teatro Lirico di Cagliari in Sardinia.

In 2010, he released Live at Amigdala Theatre, an album recorded at the Amigdala Theatre in Trezzo sull'Adda, featuring Pablo Leoni on drums and Davide Speranza on harmonica. He also performed at various national and international festivals, including the Pistoia Blues Festival in Italy (where he was the opening act for Jimmie Vaughan and Robert Cray); the Black and Blue Festival in Montreal (opening for Larry Carlton); the Magic Blues Festival in Switzerland; the Santa Blues Festival in Tenerife (playing guitar for the American singer Sandra Hall); and the Blues Au Chateau Festival in France.

In 2011, he went on a theatrical tour as the opening act for the Treves Blues Band. That November, he won the Premio Maria Carta award.

In 2012, he released his second studio album, Ma-Moo Tones, produced by Eric Bibb. The album was named one of the "Best 10 Records of the Year" by the magazine Buscadero, and Piu began a long tour that included shows in Canada (where he performed at the famous El Mocambo), France (where he played at the Cognac Blues Passions Festival), Spain, the United Kingdom, Norway, Slovenia, Switzerland, and Germany (where he opened for Albert Lee).

In 2014, Piu released Live at Bloom, in which he used a hybrid guitar with two bass strings, called the Reani guitarbass. Also, that year, the Italian Blues River Festival gave him the Gianni Mangione Blues Award.

In January 2015, he started his first American tour. He performed in Mississippi (Club Ebony in Indianola, Ground Zero, the Shack Up Inn, and Red's Juke Joint in Clarksdale), Tennessee (the Center for Southern Folklore), and California (House of Blues in Los Angeles and Biscuits and Blues in San Francisco), and recorded at Sun Studio in Memphis.

== Discography ==
=== Albums ===
- 2007: Blues Journey (Groove Company)
- 2010: Live at Amigdala Theatre (Groove Company)
- 2012: Ma-Moo Tones (Groove Company)
- 2014: Live at Bloom (Groove Company)
- 2016: Peace & Groove (Appaloosa Records)
- 2018: The Cann O' Now Sessions (Appaloosa Records)
- 2019: Crossing (Appaloosa Records)
- 2021: Live in France (Appaloosa Records)
- 2023: Back Home (Self Production)
- 2024: From The Livingroom (Appaloosa Records)
