= Otto Dempwolff =

German linguist (1871–1938)

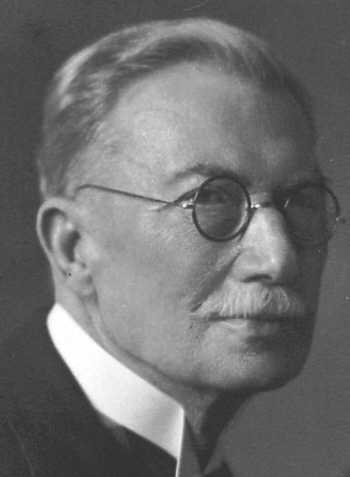
- Born: 25 May 1871; Pillau, Province of Prussia (now Baltiysk, Russia)
- Died: 27 November 1938 (aged 67); Hamburg, Nazi Germany

Academic work
- Discipline: Linguistics; anthropology
- Sub-discipline: Austronesian languages

Otto Karl August Dempwolff (25 May 1871 – 27 November 1938) was a German physician, linguist, and anthropologist who specialized in the study of the Austronesian languages. He is considered the father of the historical and comparative linguistics of the Austronesian languages.

Initially trained as a physician, Dempwolff began his linguistic research while serving as medical doctor in the German colonies German New Guinea and German East Africa. Under the mentorship of Carl Meinhof, he began his academic career at the Hamburgisches Kolonialinstitut, which later became part of the University of Hamburg. In 1931, he founded the Seminar für indonesische und Südseesprachen, which he headed until his death in 1938. He was also appointed to the Royal Prussian Phonographic Commission (Königlich Preußische Phonographische Kommission) for his expertise in medicine, as well as African and Indonesian languages. The purpose of the commission was to record the approximately 250 languages spoken by the prisoners of German World War I prisoner-of-war camps.

His magnum opus Vergleichende Lautlehre des austronesischen Wortschatzes ('Comparative Phonology of Austronesian Vocabularies'; 1934–1937) was the first systematic and comprehensive reconstruction of the Proto-Austronesian sound system and vocabulary.

== Selected works ==
- Dempwolff, Otto (1916). Die Sandawe, Linguistisches und ethnographisches Material aus Deutsch Ostafrika, Abhandlungen des Hamburger Kolonialinstituts. Band XXXIV/Heft 19, L. Friederichsen, Hamburg 1916, 180 Seiten.
- Dempwolff, Otto (1920) Die Lautentsprechungen der indonesischen Lippenlaute in einigen anderen austronesischen Sprachen, Habilitationsschrift. ZfES 2.Beiheft, Dietrich Reimer, Berlin 1920, 96 Seiten.
- Dempwolff, Otto (1934). Vergleichende Lautlehre des austronesischen Wortschatzes, Band 1: Induktiver Aufbau einer indonesischen Ursprache. Beihefte zur Zeitschrift für Eingeborenen-Sprachen 15. Berlin: Dietrich Reimer.
- Dempwolff, Otto (1937). Vergleichende Lautlehre des austronesischen Wortschatzes, Band 2: Deduktive Anwendung des Urindonesischen auf austronesische Einzelsprachen. Beihefte zur Zeitschrift für Eingeborenen-Sprachen 17. Berlin: Dietrich Reimer.
- Dempwolff, Otto (1938). Vergleichende Lautlehre des austronesischen Wortschatzes, Band 3: Austronesisches Wörterverzeichnis. Beihefte zur Zeitschrift für Eingeborenen-Sprachen 19. Berlin: Dietrich Reimer.
- Dempwolff, Otto (1939). Grammatik der Jabêm-Sprache auf Neuguinea. Abhandlungen aus dem Gebiet der Auslandskunde, vol. 50. Hamburg: Friederichsen de Gruyter.

== See also ==
- Proto-Oceanic language
