= Huon Gulf =

Gulf of the Solomon Sea on the coast of New Guinea

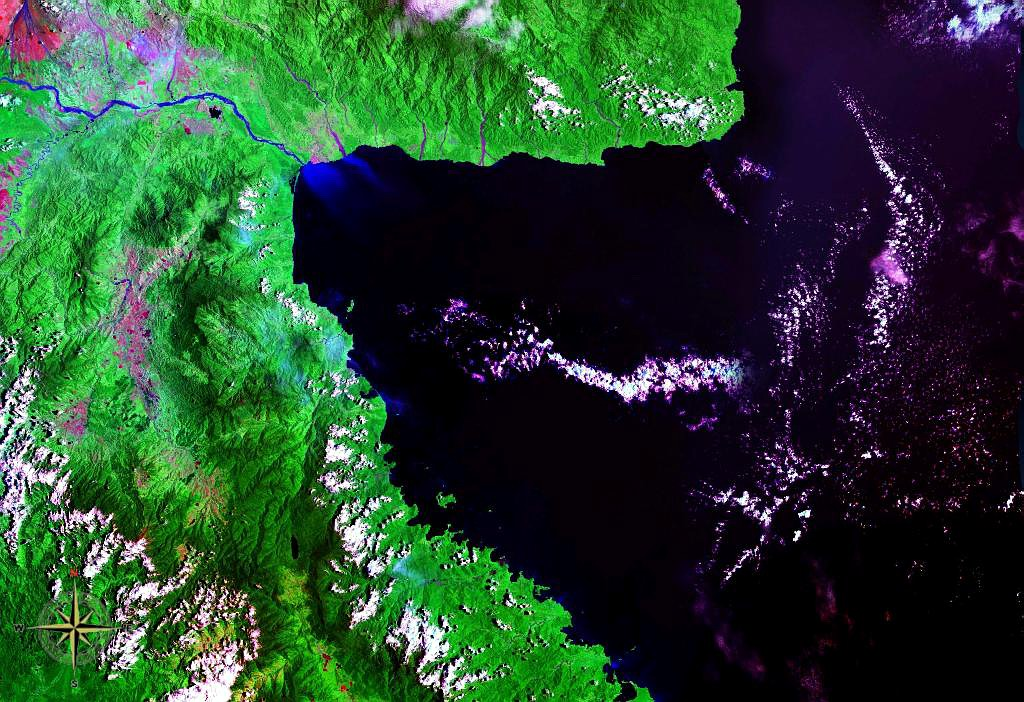
- Huon Gulf seen from space (false color)

- Location within Papua New Guinea
- Location: Morobe Province
- Coordinates: 7°00′S 147°27′E
- Type: Gulf
- River sources: Markham
- Ocean/sea sources: Solomon Sea
- Basin countries: Papua New Guinea
- Max. length: 150 km (93 mi)
- Max. width: 100 km (62 mi)
- Surface area: 7,250 km^{2} (2,800 sq mi)
- Settlements: Lae and Salamaua

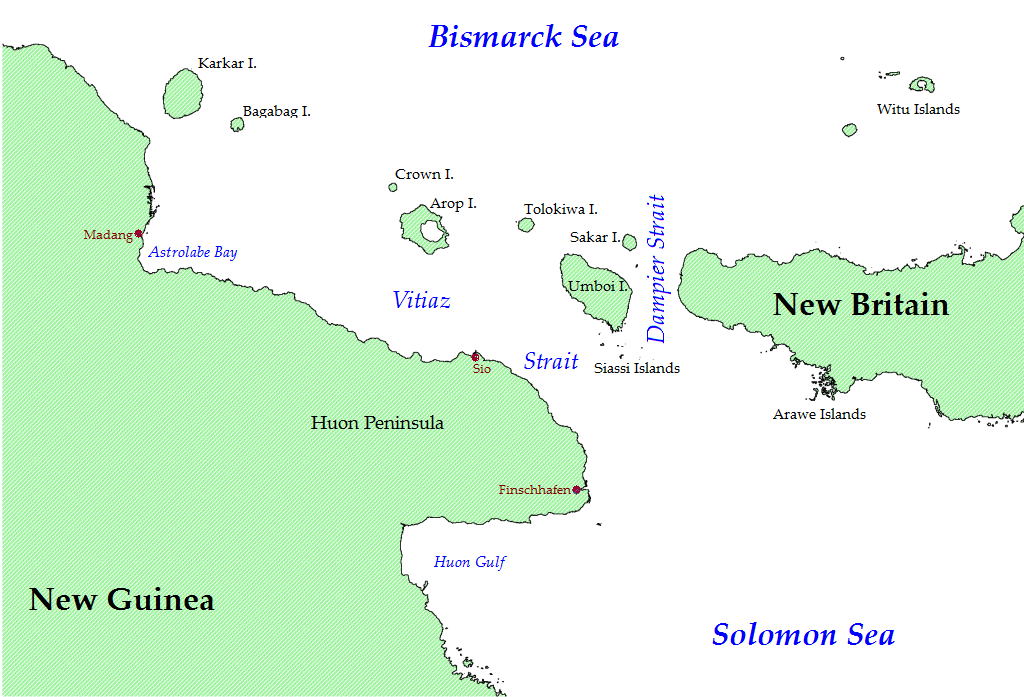
Location of Huon Gulf in the lower center

Huon Gulf is a large gulf in eastern Papua New Guinea. It is bordered by Huon Peninsula in the north. Both are named after French explorer Jean-Michel Huon de Kermadec. Huon Gulf is a part of the Solomon Sea. Its northern boundary is marked by Cape Cretin, southern by Cape Longerue. The coast, which quickly increases in elevation from the beach, is bordered by the Rawlinson Range to the north and the Kuper Range to the west, which rises to about 600 m (2,000 ft). More distantly northwest is the Finisterre Range. Lae, capital of the Morobe Province, is located on the northern coast of the gulf.

Markham Bay forms the north-western corner of Huon Gulf, where the Markham River ends.

== Name ==
This body of water is named for 18th Century French military officer Jean-Michel Huon de Kermadec.

== Extent ==
The Huon Gulf is a large triangular body of water, marked at the north by Cape Cretin, and counter-clockwise bordered by the Huon Peninsula in the north, and the northwest corner by the Markham River outlet. Continuing the coast continues as a tangent southeasterly to Cape Longerue. To the south of that is Nassau Bay. The east of the Huon Gulf opens out to the Solomon Sea, which in turn is connected to the Pacific Ocean. It is about 55 miles from west to east and 40 miles across.

== Population, culture, and languages ==
The Melanesian people around the Huon Gulf have an inimitable physical culture, which includes "apa" wood carvings.

Many of the indigenous peoples speak one of the Oceanic languages. Beyond that, more specific families of languages are contested; these include Huon-Gulf and Markham languages. Papua New Guinea, because of having both language contact from the Gulf and Ocean yet geographical isolation from the mountainous land of one of the largest islands in the world, has the greatest variety of languages in the world. Some of these languages, such as the Numbami language, are "vulnerable" to extinction. Proto-Markham, whose daughter languages are spoken on the Gulf coast and further inland, was proposed by Susanne Holzknecht. They are all part of a proposed grouping of Western Oceanic languages.

== Geology ==
The Huon Gulf is ultimately formed by the Australian plate being deformed and pushed beneath the Huon Peninsula. Evidence of this phenomenon is in the morphology (shapes) of the Gulf and surrounding lands, and "both emergent (raised) and submergent (drowned) Corolla reefs associated with the growth of the Finisterre Range, Papua New Guinea."

== Hydrology ==
Due to "the adjacent marine environment" of relatively "small tides," there is little sediment transport into the Huon Gulf.

== History ==
The area on the north shore of Huon Gulf was a protectorate and later a colony of Germany as part of German New Guinea from 1884 to 1914. In September, the Australian Naval and Military Expeditionary Force invaded, and the German troops quickly surrendered.

Australia controlled the region from 1914 to 1974, except during World War II, when the Empire of Japan invaded in February 1942. The New Guinea campaign resulted in the Invasion of Salamaua–Lae on 8 March 1942. Australian and American military forces under the command of Vice Admiral Daniel E. Barbey invaded the Gulf on 30 June 1943, and by 8 July, the Landing at Nassau Bay, south of the Huon Gulf, was successfully completed. However, due to logistics, the Allied forces were unable to take the entire island of Papua New Guinea, so they blockaded the island and starved the Japanese forces trapped there.

Due to its remote geographical location, the people of the region around the Huon Gulf have been isolated. Only in the 2020s was there a concerted investment by the government to improve infrastructure, including roads, speed boats for emergency medical services, ports.

== Geography ==
Near Lae and Finschhafen, the wet season runs from May to August, in contrast to most of the country.

== Biota ==
In the late 19th century, many new birds were first discovered in the coastal areas around Huon Gulf, including new species of ibis and cassowary.

Taro grows in the Huon Gulf area, but the demand for trade in it has been low.
