= Numbami language =

Austronesian language

Numbami
- Native to: Papua New Guinea
- Region: coastal village in Morobe Province
- Native speakers: 200 (2007)
- Language family: Austronesian: Malayo-Polynesian; Oceanic; Western Oceanic; North New Guinea; Huon Gulf; Numbami

Language codes
- ISO 639-3: sij
- Glottolog: numb1247
- ELP: Numbami
- Numbami is classified as Vulnerable by the UNESCO Atlas of the World's Languages in Danger.

Numbami (also known as Siboma or Sipoma) is an Austronesian language spoken by about 200 people with ties to a single village in Morobe Province, Papua New Guinea. It is spoken in Siboma village (7.512985°S 147.301128°E), Paiawa ward, Morobe Rural LLG.

Numbami is a phonologically conservative isolate within the Huon Gulf languages, and is the last Austronesian language on the south coast of the Huon Gulf. Its nearest relatives along the coast to the southeast are 270 km (170 mi) away, Maisin and Arifama-Miniafia in Oro Province (Northern Province in the former colony of Papua).

The word order typology of Numbami and the Huon Gulf languages is subject–verb–object (SVO), which is typical of Austronesian languages; while that of Arifama-Miniafia and most of the Papuan Tip languages is subject–object–verb (SOV), which is typical of Papuan languages. Maisin has been characterized as a mixed language, with both Austronesian and Papuan features that obscure its primary heritage, and there is evidence that settlements of Austronesian speakers along the 270 km of coast were gradually absorbed into inland communities speaking Binanderean languages (Bradshaw 2017).

== Phonology ==
Numbami distinguishes 5 vowels and 18 consonants. Voiceless /s/ is a fricative, but its voiced and prenasalized equivalents are affricated, varying between more alveolar [(n)dz] and more palatalized [(n)dʒ]. The liquid /l/ is usually rendered as a flap [ɾ]. The labial approximant is slightly fricative, tending toward [β], when followed by front vowels.

=== Vowels (orthographic) ===
	Front	Central	Back
High	i		u
Mid	e		o
Low		a	

=== Consonants (orthographic) ===
	Bilabial	Dental	Alveopalatal	Velar
Voiceless	p	t	s	k
Voiced	b	d	z	g
Prenasalized	-mb-	-nd-	-nz-	-ŋg-
Nasal	m	n		ŋ
Liquid		l		
Approximant	w		y	

==== Obstruent harmony ====
Prenasalized obstruents only occur in medial position, where the distinction between oral and prenasalized voiced obstruents is somewhat predictable. Medial voiced obstruents are statistically far more likely to be oral in words beginning with oral voiced obstruents, while they are far more likely to be prenasalized in words beginning with anything else. If denasalization of voiced obstruents is an ongoing change, one can track its progress through different lexical environments: it is 100% complete in word-initial position (as in bola 'pig' and buwa 'areca nut'), 80% complete in the middle of words beginning with voiced obstruents (as in bada 'market' and dabola 'head' vs. zanzami 'driftwood'), 35% complete in the middle of words beginning with approximants or vowels (as in ababa 'crosswise' vs. ambamba 'handdrum' and waŋga 'canoe'), not quite 20% complete in words beginning with voiceless obstruents (as in kaze 'left side' vs. kaimbombo 'butterfly' and pindipanda 'flea'), not quite 5% complete in words beginning with nasals (as in nomba 'thing' and -mande 'to die'), and not attested at all in words beginning with liquids (as in lenda 'nit' and lindami 'lime spatula'). (See Bradshaw 1978a.)

== Morphology ==
Although Numbami is phonologically conservative, it retains very little productive morphology, most of it related to person and number marking.

=== Pronouns and person markers ===
==== Free pronouns ====
Free pronouns occur in the same positions as subject or object nouns. They distinguish three persons (with a clusivity distinction in the first person) and four numbers (Bradshaw 1982a).

Person	Singular	Plural	Dual	Paucal
1st person inclusive		aita	atuwa	aito
1st person exclusive	woya	i	ilu(wa)	ito
2nd person	aiya	amu	amula	amuto
3rd person	e	ai	alu(wa)	aito

==== Genitive pronouns ====
Genitive pronouns also distinguish three persons (plus clusivity) and four numbers (Bradshaw 1982a).

Person	Singular	Plural	Dual	Paucal
1st person inclusive		aita-ndi	atuwa-ndi	aito-tandi
1st person exclusive	na-ŋgi	i-na-mi	ilu(wa)-mandi	ito-mandi
2nd person	a-na-mi	amu-ndi	amula-mundi	amuto-mundi
3rd person	e-na	ai-ndi	aluwa-ndi	aito-ndi

==== Subject prefixes ====
Verbs are marked with subject prefixes that distinguish three persons (plus clusivity) and two tenses, Nonfuture and Future. (The latter distinction is often characterized as one between Realis and Irrealis mode; see Bradshaw 1993, 1999.)

Person	Sing. Nonf.	Plur. Nonf.	Sing. Fut.	Plur. Fut.
1st person inclusive		ta-		tana-
1st person exclusive	wa-	ma-	na-	mana-
2nd person	u-	mu-	nu-	muna-
3rd person	i-	ti-	ni-	ina-

In most cases, subject prefixes are easily segmentable from verb stems, but in a few very high frequency cases, prefix-final vowels merge with verb-initial vowels to yield irregularly inflected forms, as in the following paradigm: wani (< wa-ani) '1SG-eat', woni (< u-ani) '2SG-eat', weni (< i-ani) '3SG-eat', tani (< ta-ani) '1PLINCL-eat', mani (< ma-ani) '1PLEXCL-eat', moni (< mu-ani) '2PL-eat', teni (< ti-ani) '3PL-eat'.

=== Numerals ===
Traditional Numbami counting practices started with the digits of the left hand, then continued on the right hand and then the feet, to reach '20', which translates as 'one person'. Higher numbers are multiples of 'one person'. Nowadays, most counting above '5' is done in Tok Pisin. As in other Huon Gulf languages, the short form of the numeral 'one' functions as an indefinite article.

Numeral	Term	Gloss
1	sesemi / te	'one'
2	luwa	'two'
3	toli	'three'
4	wata	'four'
5	nima teula	'hands half/part'
6	nima teula ano sesemi	'hands half right one'
7	nima teula ano luwa	'hands half right two'
8	nima teula ano toli	'hands half right three'
9	nima teula ano wata	'hands half right four'
10	nima besuwa	'hands both/pair'
20	tamota te	'person one'

=== Names ===
Like many other Huon Gulf languages, Numbami has a system of birth-order names. The seventh son and sixth daughter are called "No Name": Ase Mou 'name none'.

Birth order	Sons	Daughters
1	Alisa	Kale
2	Aliŋa	Aga
3	Gae	Aya
4	Alu	Damiya
5	Sele	Owiya
6	Dei	Ase Mou
7	Ase Mou	

=== Ideophones ===
Although many languages have a class of ideophones with distinctive phonology, Numbami is unusual in having a morphological marker for such a class. The suffix -a(n)dala is unique to ideophones but is clearly related to the word andalowa 'path, way, road' (POc *jalan). (See Bradshaw 2006.) In the following examples, acute accents show the placement of word stress.

- bái-andala 'overcast, clouded over'
- dendende-ándala 'shivering'
- golópu-adala 'slipping or dripping through'
- kí-andala 'scorching, parched'
- paká-adala 'getting light, flashing on, popping'
- pilipíli-adala 'flapping, fluttering'
- sí-andala 'shooting up, springing away'
- sulúku-adala 'sucking, slurping'
- taká-adala 'stuck fast, planted firmly'
- tíki-adala 'going dark'

== Syntax ==
=== Word order ===
The basic word order in Numbami is SVO, with prepositions, preposed genitives, postposed adjectives and relative clauses. Relative clauses are marked at both ends, and so are some prepositional phrases. Negatives come at the ends of the clauses they negate. There is also a class of deverbal resultatives that follow the main verb (and its object, if any).

alu ti- lapa bola uni
3DU 3PL hit pig dead
'The two of them killed a pig.'

naŋgi gode i- loŋoni biŋa Numbami kote
GEN.1SG cousin 3SG hear talk Numbami not
'My cross-cousin doesn't understand Numbami.'

ma- ki bani manu ma- yaki na su ulaŋa
1PL.EXCL put food which 1PL.EXCL pare REL into pot
'We (excl.) put the food we've pared into the pot.'

=== Possessive vs. attributive genitives ===
Two kinds of genitive modifiers precede their heads while one type follows its head noun (Bradshaw 1982a).

==== Whole-part genitives ====
Noun-noun phrases denoting wholes and parts occur in the order stated, with the latter serving as head of the phrase: wuwu lau 'betel pepper leaf', tina daba 'headwater', nima daba (lit. 'hand head') 'thumb', kapala lalo (lit. 'house inside') 'indoors', Buzina bubusu 'Buzina (Salamaua) point'.

==== Possessive genitives ====
Genitive possessor nouns precede their head nouns, with an intervening possessive marker that distinguishes singular (na) from plural (ndi) possessors: wuwu na lau 'the leaves of the (generic) betel pepper plant; particular betel pepper plant's leaf'; kapala na lalo 'the insides of (generic) houses; the inside of a particular house'; Siasi ndi gutu 'the Siassi Islands; islands belonging to a particular group of Siassi people'; bumewe ndi bani 'food typically eaten by whites; food belonging to a particular group of whites'.

==== Attributive genitives ====
Attributive genitives resemble possessive genitives except that (1) the modifiers follow their heads, and (2) the "possessors" are nonreferential except in a generic sense, that is, they "never refer to a particular subset of the set they name" (Bradshaw 1982a:128): wuwu weni na 'forest (wild) betel pepper', wuwu Buzina ndi 'type of betel pepper associated with the Buzina people at Salamaua', walabeŋa tamtamoŋa na 'fish poison, native means of stunning fish', walabeŋa bumewe na 'explosives, European means of stunning fish'.

=== Verb serialization ===
Verb serialization is very common in Numbami. Within a serial verb construction, all verbs must agree in tense. Subject choice in successive verbs is severely constrained. Noninitial subjects can only refer to preceding subjects, preceding objects, or preceding events or conditions, and only in that order (Bradshaw 1993). Negatives come at the ends of the clauses they negate.

tako, ma- woti ma- ma ma- ŋgewe bani
enough 1PL.EXCL descend 1PL.EXCL come 1PL.EXCL carry food
'Okay, we come back down carrying food.'

aiya nu- kole nu- ŋgo biŋa de woya kote
2SG FUT.2SG turn FUT.2SG say word to 1SG not
'Don't you turn around and talk to me.'

ina- ki damu ni- nzeka kundu
FUT.3PL put dry.frond FUT.3SG lie.upon sago.starch
'They'll put dry fronds on top of the sago starch.'

wa aiya nu- ki yawi ni- soloŋa
and 2SG FUT.2SG put fire FUT.3SG enter
'And you'll set it afire.'

woya wa- yoŋgo aiya i- muŋga
1SG 1SG see 2SG 3SG precede
'I saw you first.'

takalama iluwa ma- yoŋgo ata i- wete -ma kote
today 1DU.EXCL 1PL.EXCL see self 3SG count ADV not
'Nowadays, we two don't see each other very regularly.'

== See also ==
- Huon Gulf
- Huon Gulf languages
- Oceanic languages
- Austronesian languages
