= Huon Gulf languages =

Western Oceanic languages

Huon Gulf
- Geographic distribution: Papua New Guinea
- Linguistic classification: Austronesian: Malayo-Polynesian; Oceanic; Western Oceanic; North New Guinea; Huon Gulf
- Proto-language: Proto-Huon Gulf
- Subdivisions: Markham; North Huon Gulf; Numbami; South Huon Gulf

Language codes
- ISO 639-3: –
- Glottolog: huon1245

The Huon Gulf languages are Western Oceanic languages spoken primarily in Morobe Province of Papua New Guinea. They may form a group of the North New Guinea languages, perhaps within the Ngero–Vitiaz branch of that family.

Unusually for Oceanic languages, two North Huon Gulf languages, Bukawa and Yabem, are tonal. The only other tonal Oceanic languages are found in New Caledonia.

== Classification ==
According to Lynch, Ross, & Crowley (2002), the structure of the family is as follows:

- North Huon Gulf linkage
- Markham family
- South Huon Gulf linkage
- Numbami

== Proto-language ==
Proto-Huon Gulf
- Reconstruction of: Huon Gulf languages
- Reconstructed ancestors: Proto-Austronesian: Proto-Malayo-Polynesian; Proto-Oceanic
- Lower-order reconstructions: Proto-Markham

Proto-Huon Gulf was reconstructed by Malcolm Ross in 1988 in Proto-Oceanic and the Austronesian Languages of Western Melanesia. It is reconstructed on the basis of shared phonological, morphosyntactic and lexicosemantic innovations relative to Proto-Oceanic, such as the pervasive lenition of Proto-Oceanic *p to *v, the acquisition of a final *-c in some words, the idiosyncratic change of Proto-Oceanic *boRok 'pig' to Proto-Huon Gulf *boR, and the loss of all verb-deriving prefixes such as *pa- 'causative', *paRi- 'reciprocal', *ma- 'stative', and *ta- 'intransitive'.

=== Vowels ===
The vowels of Proto-Huon Gulf, according to Ross, are:

Vowels
	Front	Central	Back
Close	*i		*u
Close-mid	*e		*o
Open		*a	

=== Consonants ===
The consonants of Proto-Huon Gulf, according to Ross, are:

Consonants
		Labiovelar	Bilabial	Alveolar	Palatal	Velar	Uvular
Stop	voiced		*b	*d	*ɟ	*g	
Stop	voiceless		*p	*t	*c	*k	
Nasal		*mʷ	*m	*n	*ɲ	*ŋ	
Fricative		*v		*s		*ɣ	
Approximant		*w		*l, *r	*j		*ʀ
