= Goodenough Bay =

Bay in Milne Bay Province, Papua New Guinea

- 1956 map

- Location in Papua New Guinea
- Interactive map of Goodenough Bay
- Location: Milne Bay Province
- Coordinates: 9°55′S 149°55′E
- Type: Bay
- Etymology: Named after James Graham Goodenough
- Part of: Solomon Sea
- Ocean/sea sources: Pacific Ocean
- Basin countries: Papua New Guinea
- Max. length: 40 km (25 mi)
- Max. width: 37 km (23 mi)
- Max. temperature: 35 °C (95 °F)
- Min. temperature: 17 °C (63 °F)
- Islands: 2

Goodenough Bay is a large bay on the northern coast of the Papuan Peninsula, in the southeast of the Papua New Guinean mainland. Located in Milne Bay Province, it spans roughly 40 kilometres (25 mi) by 37 kilometres (23 mi), with a coastline running from the eastern tip of Cape Vogel to a prominent headland called Cape Frere. It forms part of the Solomon Sea, within the south Pacific Ocean. The northern coast along Cape Vogel is hilly, while the southern coast along the main Papuan peninsula is steeper and connects inland to the Owen Stanley Range. The waters of the bay are deep, with few areas ships can easily anchor, although coastal areas contain a few coral reefs.

The bay lies along an active fault line, and likely formed during the Pliocene when what are now the D'Entrecasteaux Islands were pushed apart from mainland New Guinea. The area remains tectonically active. The local communities living around the bay speak a variety of different and sometimes largely unrelated Austronesian languages. The first European to survey the area was John Moresby, who named the bay after James Graham Goodenough. An Anglican mission was established at Dogura in 1891. In the Second World War the bay saw conflict during the New Guinea campaign, particularly around the Battle of Milne Bay.

== Geography ==
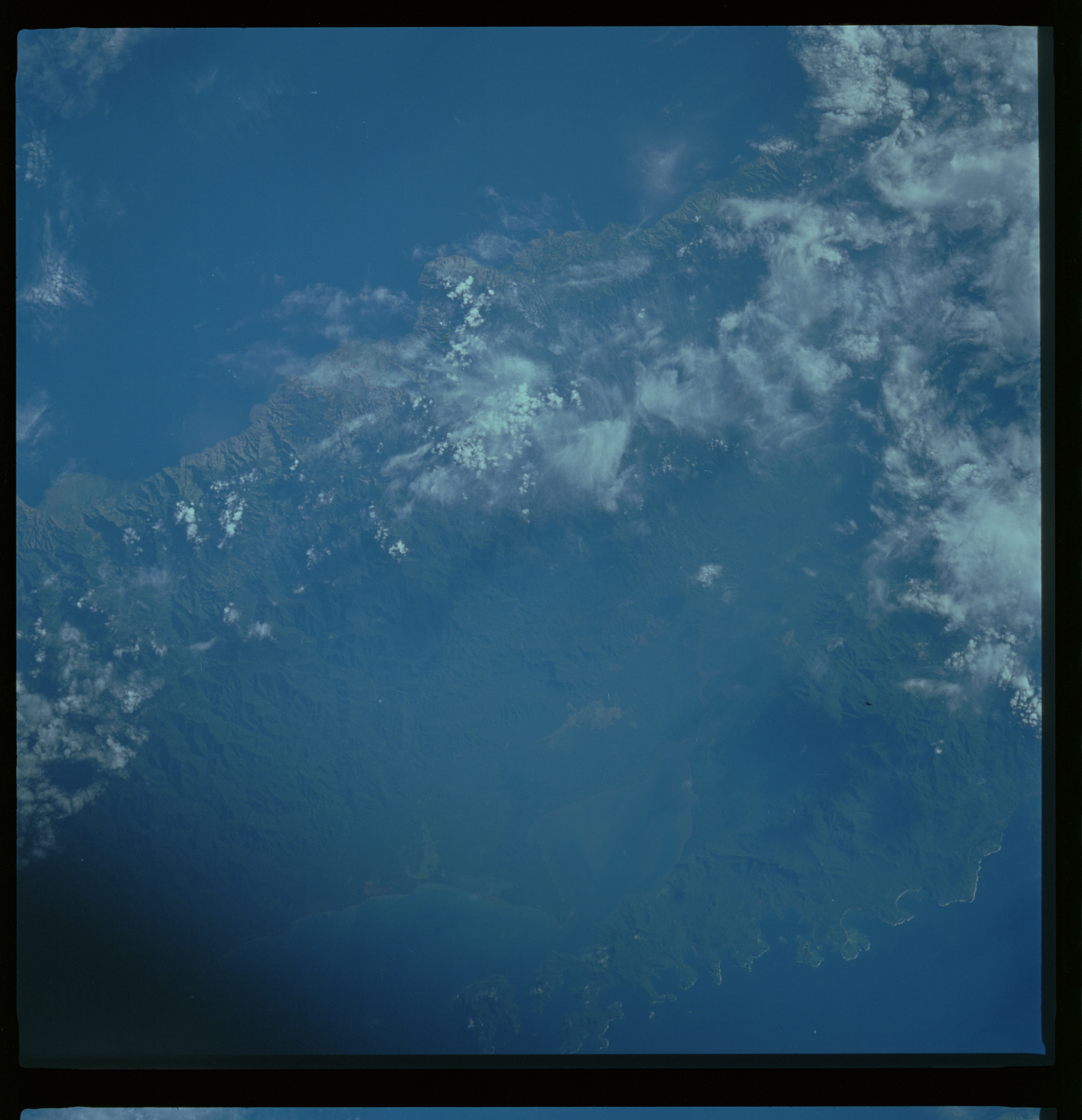
The Papuan Peninsula with the southern end Goodenough Bay to the north (top) with Cape Frere prominent in the middle. To the south of the peninsula (bottom) is Orangerie Bay.

Goodenough Bay is one of a series of bays along the northern coast of the Papuan Peninsula, with the Huon Gulf, Oro Bay, and Collingwood Bay to its west and Milne Bay to its east. Goodenough Bay itself is about 40 kilometres (25 mi) from east to west and 37 kilometres (23 mi) from north to south.

The northern coast is a relatively low-lying stretch of land that forms part of Cape Vogel. The low and flat coastal hills on the western stretch of this coastline are around 100 metres (330 ft) high. Towards the end of the cape, they approach 180 metres (590 ft). These hills are densely forested. The northeastern end of this peninsula and the northwest boundary of Goodenough Bay is the 10.7-metre (35 ft) high Glen Islet. This islet lies on a coral reef extending about 730 metres (2,400 ft) from the mainland which has a sandbank on its eastern side. The mainland closest to Glen Islet is known as Sibiribiri Point (9°43'S., 150°03'E.).

Rawdon Bay lies along the northern coast (9°47'S., 149°53'E.). Within it lie two small coral islets known as the Mosquito islets. The larger islet is named Baniara. The water in this bay and around the islands contains coral reefs. Less than 5 kilometres (3.1 mi) east (9°46'S., 149°56'E.) of Rawdon Bay is Menapi Bay, which also contains a reef. There are no notable coral reefs elsewhere in the bay.

Cape Frere provides the southeast limit of Goodenough Bay. The very small Dogura Bay and the larger Bartle Bay are to its west.

There are no large rivers on the northern coast. Near the head of the bay, the Ruaba River flows from the Gwoira Range. The head of the bay sees a marked change in coastal topography as Cape Vogel is replaced by the main Papuan peninsula. While mostly mountainous, alluvial plains have formed in some areas where rivers flowing down from the mountains enter the bay.

Much of the southern coast is a series of headlands separated by heavily sedimented smaller bays. The sediment inhibits coral settling in the bays, although some coral fringes the headlands. Smaller bays along the southern coast include Rebuda Bay, Dogura Bay, and Bartle Bay. Bartle Bay is about 6.5 kilometres (4.0 mi) wide, and has inputs from two navigable rivers and a stream. It is 89.6 metres (294 ft) deep at its head. Inland the southern coast has a series of small plateaus around 230 metres (750 ft) high. Behind them lies the Owen Stanley Range, which include areas of limited forest cover and peaks reaching 3,000 metres (9,800 ft). This coastline is quite dry, and instead of forest much of the southern coast is instead covered in grasses.

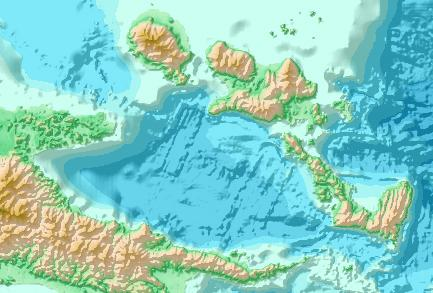
The coasts of Goodenough Bay steeply descend from the mountains to the seafloor

Just east of Bartle Bay is Cape Frere, the eastern end of the bay (10°06'S., 150°10'E.). This cape is over 900 metres (3,000 ft) high, with ravines leading down to the coast. This seafloor near Cape Frere is steep with no reef. In general, the bay is quite deep, reaching 1,000 metres (3,300 ft). The only suitable anchorages are in Rawdon Bay and Menapi Bay.

The bay's depth likely results from geologic activity that has created a number of deep ocean chasms in the region. The Owen-Stanley fault runs from the head of the bay along the southern coast, separating the Trobriand plate/Solomon Sea plate which contains Cape Vogel and most of the bay from the main Indo-Australian plate on which lies the southern coast. This fault means the bay sometimes experiences earthquakes. Smaller faultlines occur elsewhere in the bay. Historical earthquakes are thought to have uplifted the southern coast. Goodenough Bay likely formed in the Pliocene when the D'Entrecasteaux Islands became separated from the mainland. The channel between these islands and Goodenough Bay is Ward Hunt Strait.

The entire bay proper is classified as internal waters of Papua New Guinea. The area around the bay is part of Alotau Urban LLG, part of Milne Bay Province. Occasionally, wider definitions of the bay include the water stretching further east towards East Cape, and occasionally also the water stretching north to the D'Entrecasteaux Islands. The northern Papuan Peninsula coastline, including Goodenough Bay, is considered part of the Solomon Sea region of the south Pacific Ocean.

The area has a dry season and a wet season, although temperatures remain roughly the same throughout the year, between 17 °C (63 °F) and 35 °C (95 °F). Rainfall differences between the seasons shift rivers between dry beds and flows up to 3 metres (9.8 ft) high. The April to December dry season of the southern coast is longer than in most other areas of the country. Wind direction changes throughout the year, coming from all four main compass points at different times.

== Demographics ==
On the southern coast, villages are often situated on the alluvial plains between the mountains and the sea. Taro cultivation in these areas relies on irrigation systems which bring water from the mountains above through dams and canals. There are social links between these villages, some of which have historical rivalries.

The mission at Dogura is the headquarters of the Anglican Church of Papua New Guinea. The Ss Peter and Paul Cathedral was built in 1936, and the mission station also contains a bank, post office, hospital, primary school, high school, and a small airstrip.

The people at the eastern tip of Cape Vogel speak Are. The people living along the southern coast of Cape Vogel speak Gapapaiwa. Other languages spoken around the bay include Umanakaina, Yakaikeke, Kanasi, Dawawa, Ghayavi, and Ginuman. Four coastal villages in the southern part of the bay near Cape Frere speak Wedau, with each village having a slightly different dialect. In the Owen Stanely Range inland from these villages, Kakabai is spoken. These languages are all Austronesian, but come from multiple mutually unintelligible subfamilies. Wedau was the local language in what became the Dogura mission. It was consequently adopted by Anglican missionaries, later becoming, to some extent, a lingua franca for the local area.

For the village of Wamira on the southern coast, population growth has been counteracted by migration to towns and cities, leaving the population in the village at roughly 400 since records began in 1896. Wamira residents have been competitive in local labour markets due to their easier access to education at the nearby Dogura mission. The people of Wamira are divided into two communities, each of which has developed its own cultural practices and has its own traditional leaders. The village as a whole elects one councillor to local government, usually chosen due to their familiarity with outsiders and formal politics than due to status within the village.

== History ==
The coast trends W.N.W. from Cape Frere for some thirty miles to the bight of Goodenough Bay, which is marked by some fine waterfalls, which flash down its dark green mountain sides. So much river water is here discharged that the surface of the bay near the shore is quite fresh. A mud flat offered us a good anchorage here; and on some small islets off the coast, we obtained an abundant supply of pigeons.

— John Moresby

Archeological finds show that there have long been links between the people in Goodenough Bay and those elsewhere in Southeast New Guinea, such as people from Collingwood Bay to the northwest and Milne Bay and offshore islands to the southeast. Stone art from Goodenough Bay is similar to that of Normanby Island. Numerous obsidian artefacts have also been found. Petroglyphs have been found near a number of villages in the area. The way stones were used may also indicate links with the Trobriand Islands. Goodenough Bay rock art shows similar motifs to those made near the Sepik river, near Yos Sudarso Bay, on New Hanover Island, and in New Caledonia.

F. E. Williams began an excavation of a stone circle at Boianai, slightly inland from the coast, in February 1926. This was one of the earliest excavations in the country. Boianai has large carvings and pavements. These artworks are associated with mythical beings, most prominently Wakeke, who is said to be the village founder. The excavation by Williams was viewed poorly by those in Boianai, who at least until 1970 viewed it as a spiritual place. Some myths are known from the area, and motifs such as a snake which has a human child also occur in other areas such as the New Hebrides and the Solomon Islands.

The first European to explore the coast was British Captain John Moresby, who surveyed the area from 1873 to 1874 onboard HMS Basilisk. He named Goodenough Bay after another navy officer, Commodore James Graham Goodenough.

Missionaries working in the southeast of Papua divided the area between them, with Goodenough Bay falling under the Anglican area. The headquarters of this Anglican mission was established in Dogura Bay in 1891 by Albert Alexander Maclaren and Copland King. Maclaren died from fever within the year. King became the head of the mission, which undertook not only missionary work but sought to reduce tribal violence. Over time, the decrease in violence allowed those in local communities to travel further.

1944 map produced by the Australian Army showing the western part of Goodenough Bay and the Gwoira Range inland

Baptisms of Papuans began from around 1896. Around that time, Bartle Bay also became a waystation for miners from the Louisiade Archipelago and Queensland seeking gold in the Owen Stanley Range. These miners depended on local guides, who would take them within the territory of their community. Some visitors collecting items from Goodenough Bay often found that it was rare to encounter women. Some observed cannibalism. There was one coconut plantation on the northern coast in 1940.

In the New Guinea campaign of the Second World War, Goodenough Bay formed part of the strategic area between the Allied-held Milne Bay and the Japanese beachheads at Buna and Gona. Japanese forces planned to attack Milne Bay in part through a landing at Goodenough Bay, and later retreated through Goodenough Bay following the Battle of Milne Bay. Some retreating Japanese fighters were shot down over the bay. Later, Goodenough Bay served as a practice area for allied naval forces operating out of Goodenough Island.
