= List of endangered languages in Papua New Guinea =

Language Endangerment Status by UNESCO Atlas of the World's Languages in Danger category

Extinct (EX)
- Extinct (EX): (lists)

Endangered
- Critically Endangered (CR); Severely Endangered (SE); Definitely Endangered (DE); Vulnerable (VU): (list); (list); (list); (list)

Safe
- Safe (NE): no list
- Other categories
- Revived (RE); Constructed (CL): (list); (list)
- Related topics: Atlas of the World's Languages in Danger; Endangered Languages Project; Ethnologue; Unclassified language; List of languages by total number of speakers
- UNESCO Atlas of the World's; Languages in Danger categories

An endangered language is a language that it is at risk of falling out of use, generally because it has few surviving speakers. If it loses all of its native speakers, it becomes an extinct language. UNESCO defines four levels of language endangerment between "safe" (not endangered) and "extinct":

- Vulnerable
- Definitely endangered
- Severely endangered
- Critically endangered

Language	Speakers	Status	Comments
Abaga	600 (2017)	Critically endangered	
Abom	3 (2018)	Critically endangered	
Ainbai	100 (2003)	Severely endangered	
Ak	10 (2017)	Severely endangered	
Anuki	890 (2001)	Definitely endangered	
Arawum	60 (2000)	Severely endangered	
Ari	50 (2000)	Severely endangered	
Bagupi	50 (2000)	Definitely endangered	
Bauni	300 (2000)	Severely endangered	
Bepour	50 (2000)	Severely endangered	
Bikaru	100 (1981)	Severely endangered	
Boselewa	880 (2011)	Vulnerable	
Budibud	310 (2000)	Vulnerable	
Bukiyip	16,000 (2003)	Vulnerable	
Bulgebi	150 (2015)	Definitely endangered	
Bumbita	4,300 (2003)	Vulnerable	
Doga	200 (2000)	Definitely endangered	
Dumun	120 (2000)	Critically endangered	
Duwet	400 (2011)	Vulnerable	
Gorovu	20 (2007)	Severely endangered	
Grass Koiari	1,700 (2000)	Vulnerable	
Guramalum	3–4 (1987)	Critically endangered	Presumed extinct
Gweda	26 (2001)	Definitely endangered	
Iteri	480 (2003)	Severely endangered	
Kaiep	200 (2007)	Vulnerable	
Kaki Ae	630 (2015)	Vulnerable	
Kamasa	7 (2003)	Critically endangered	
Kandas	1,400 (2010)	Vulnerable	
Kaningra	330 (2006)	Vulnerable	
Karian	34 (2007)	Critically endangered	
Karore	550 (2003)	Vulnerable	
Kawacha	12 (2000)	Critically endangered	
Koita	2,700 (2000)	Vulnerable	
Kowaki	25 (2000)	Critically endangered	
Kuot	1,500 (2002)	Vulnerable	
Kursav	10 (2015)	Severely endangered	
Laxudumau	800 (2020)	Vulnerable	
Likum	80 (2000)	Definitely endangered	
Magori	100 (2000)	Vulnerable	
Makolkol	7 (1988)	Critically endangered	
Mand	8 (2015)	Definitely endangered	
Mawak	25 (2000)	Critically endangered	
Mindiri	80 (2000)	Severely endangered	
Moere	50 (2000)	Severely endangered	
Mosimo	50 (2000)	Severely endangered	
Mumeng	2,050 (2000–2003)	Definitely endangered	
Musom	200 (2007)	Definitely endangered	
Mussau-Emira	5,000 (2003)	Definitely endangered	
Mwatebu	120 (2000)	Definitely endangered	
Nafi	160 (1988)	Severely endangered	
Namo	370 (2018)	Severely endangered	
Nauna	420 (2000)	Vulnerable	
Neme	200 (2018)	Severely endangered	
Nete	1,000 (2000–2003)	Severely endangered	
Nor	1,000 (2000)	Vulnerable	
Numbami	200 (2007)	Vulnerable	
Odoodee	490 (2002)	Severely endangered	
Onjob	150 (2000)	Vulnerable	
Papapana	120 (2000)	Definitely endangered	
Papi	220 (2011)	Severely endangered	
Piame	100 (1981)	Severely endangered	
Piu	100 (2000)	Definitely endangered	
Puari	35 (2003)	Critically endangered	
Rema	12 (2012)	Severely endangered	
Samosa	90 (2000)	Severely endangered	
Sengseng	1,800 (2003)	Vulnerable	
Sepa	700 (2003)	Vulnerable	
Sera	510 (2000)	Severely endangered	
Siawi	220 (2007)	Severely endangered	
Sissano	300 (2000)	Critically endangered	
Som	500 (2017)	Definitely endangered	
Suarmin	140 (2000)	Definitely endangered	
Suena	3,600 (2000)	Critically endangered	
Sumariup	80 (1993)	Severely endangered	
Susuami	10 (2000)	Critically endangered	
Taulil	2,000 (2012)	Vulnerable	
Tayap	<50 (2020)	Severely endangered	
Tenis	30 (2000)	Critically endangered	
Turaka	25 (2000)	Critically endangered	
Uya	270 (2003)	Severely endangered	
Vehes	70 (2000)	Severely endangered	
Wab	120 (2000)	Vulnerable	
Wantoat	8,200 (1987)	Critically endangered	
Yapunda	60 (2000)	Severely endangered	
Yarawata	130 (2003)	Severely endangered	
Yimas	50 (2016)	Severely endangered	
