= Tawala language =

Austronesian language spoken in Papua New Guinea

Tawala
- Kehelala
- Native to: Papua New Guinea
- Region: Milne Bay Province
- Native speakers: (20,000 cited 2000 census)
- Language family: Austronesian: Malayo-Polynesian; Oceanic; Western Oceanic; Papuan Tip; Nuclear Papuan Tip; North Mainland – D'Entrecasteaux; Taupota; Tawala

Language codes
- ISO 639-3: tbo
- Glottolog: tawa1275

Tawala is an Oceanic language of the Milne Bay Province, Papua New Guinea. It is spoken by 20,000 people who live in hamlets and small villages on the East Cape peninsula, on the shores of Milne Bay and on areas of the islands of Sideia and Basilaki. There are approximately 40 main centres of population each speaking the same dialect, although through the process of colonisation some centres have gained more prominence than others.

== Phonology ==
Tawala has a consonant inventory of nineteen consonants, an average vowel quality inventory of five vowels, and an also average consonant-vowel ratio of three.

=== Consonants ===
Tawala consonants
	Labial	Alveolar	Retroflex	Velar	Glottal
Plosive	p b	t d		k g	ʔ
Labialised Plosive	pʷ bʷ			kʷ ɡʷ	
Nasal	m	n			
Labialized Nasal	mʷ				
Fricative		s			h
Approximant		j	ɭ	w	

/j/ may have a fricative quality [z] when between low vowels.

=== Vowels ===
Tawala vowels
	Front	Central	Back
High	i		u
Mid	e		o
Low		a	

/a/ can be fronted before /u/ as [æ] in a stressed syllable.

== Syntax ==
=== Non-verbal clauses ===
Tawala, like many Austronesian languages, makes frequent use of non-verbal constructions and phrases. This means sentences lacking verbs, not sentences being unspoken. In these situations, the verbs are simply implied by the subject, object, and context. Following are a couple simple examples of non-verbal clauses: in all there is no copula nor verb:

Polo hai am
pig there food
'The pigs have food'

Tauyai uyahi-yai ega geno-na ma tam tunawa-m om geno
we.EXCL 'at'-1PL.EXCL NEG worry-DEF but you.SG alone-2SG your.SG worry
'For us it is not a worry, but it is your worry only.'

=== Demonstratives ===
There are three demonstratives in Tawala. All three are stressed emphatic free form words which can function as spatial deictics, and two can also be used as demonstrative pronouns. Well established in the freedom of their use, they frequently occur as the only word in non-verbal sentences.

==== Spatial deictics ====
Tawala has three demonstrative spatial deictics:

PROXIMAL	geka	near speaker or hearer
NEUTRAL	naka	not near speaker
DISTAL	noka	out of sight of speaker or hearer

Tawala's demonstratives can appear in non-verbal sentences where their function is predicative and there is no subject. Following is the simplest example of this permutation:

Tau geka
I here
'I am here'

Each demonstrative also has a semi-reduplicated form which repeats the first syllable: ge-geka, na-naka, no-noka. The reduplicated form specifies exact location or time. For example, this non-verbal sentence is taken from a letter; hence the form here parallels the written original:

E-tugu-tugula no-noka
3SG.PRES-DUR-sit REDUP-there
'He has been sitting right there (in the exact position we put him)'

The demonstrative may also be marked for directional deixis – near the hearer:

Polo e-ge-ge-hi a-howa-tepa-ni
pig 3SG.PRES-DUR-come.up-DEI REDUP-there-DEI
'The pig is coming up right towards you'

==== Referential pronouns ====
While all three demonstratives function as spatial deictics, two also have a referential function as demonstrative pronouns.

PROXIMAL	geka	this
NEUTRAL	naka	that

Demonstratives typically precede and modify nouns:

geka dobu
this village
'this village'

They may function as heads of full noun phrases (NP):

Geka amaka a-howa-tepa-ni
this already 1SG-spit-top-3SG
'I have already worked magic on it'

The demonstrative naka is used as a complementizer:

Hi-i-wogatala naka apo iyowai hi-na-bagibagi
3PL-DUR-plan that FUT how 3PL-POT-work
'They were planning how they would (do their) work.'

When speakers end their discussion they often conclude with the following nonverbal clause:

...na-naka noka pite
REDUP-that that like
'... it is exactly like that'

Demonstratives function within discourse to maintain topic and prominence; they can be placed at the end of a NP as well, where they indicate topicalisation. Topicalisation is very common across both verbal and non-verbal sentences. The neutral demonstrative naka is commonly used in complex sentences to this end, but both neutral and proximal terms are applicable:

Ma [odubo-na naka] a-lau-hilage duma
and old-3SG that-TOP 1SG-DUR-finish very
'But as for the old times, I used to get very tired.'

Topicalisation can also occur with a demonstrative in the following phrase, so that two demonstratives are used consecutively:

Ma [meyagai geka] [naka meyagai dewadewa duma-na]
and village this-TOP that village good very-3SG
'As for this village that is very good village.'

And a longer example of demonstrative pronouns:

Ma [geka u houga-na] ega emoemota-na [noka dewa-hi odubo-hi]...
and this LOC time-DEF NEG ability-3SG there custom-DEF old-3PL
'But at this time it is not possible for those old customs...'

==== Phonological history ====
Tawala demonstratives are reflexes of the small set of demonstratives found in Proto-Oceanic (POC): *e/*ne designating 'near speaker', *a/*na designating 'near addressee', and *o/*no designating 'distant from both speaker and addressee'. The Tawala reflexes have experienced both phonological and semantic change through time and geographic shifts but remain clearly descended from POC. The origin of the suffix -ka is not known, though it is also found with spatial interrogative meka 'where' and the conjunction yaka, and similar suffixes may be found across Pacific languages.

Though the other reflexes are clear, ge- is not obviously a reflex of POC *e/*ne; however, the Maiwala (a nearby dialect of Taupota) form is yana, so a series of phonological shifts leading to the phonemes is plausible.

The neutral form naka includes the POC meaning of 'near hearer', overlapping the meaning of the proximal form geka. Speakers can thus use deictic forms appropriate to themselves or their hearers.

==== Comparison to neighboring languages ====
Though it can feature demonstratives following nouns, Tawala is primarily a demonstrative-noun order language. This order is typical of languages in the immediate vicinity like Saliba and Wedau, which are also closely related; however, languages surrounding the mainland area of the Milne Bay Province are predominantly noun-demonstrative order and Trans-New-Guinean. This may suggest a historic localized transit of Papuan Tip languages to the province.

Data on distance-contrast in spatial deictics in the area of Tawala is less prevalent; however, three-way contrast, as present in Tawala, appears common to the Milne Bay Province, and three-way distinction is generally more common in Pacific languages as a whole. There are less defined borders between languages of two- and three-way contrast in the Papuan Tip than for d-n order, however.

=== Negation ===
In Tawala, negation is most commonly shown through the negative particle ega, which always appears before the predicate of a clause. When the initial vowel is lengthened, forming eega, the negative particle is taken as the predicate of an existential clause, or as an interjection/response to indicate 'no'.

Ex. (1) Negation using ega

ega a tano po puwaka
NEG POSS.3SG garden and pigs
'He has no garden or pigs.'

Ex. (2) Negative existential predicate, eega

Eega
NEG
'(it is) not (so).'

Ex. (3) Negative response, eega

eega
NEG
'No.'

The negative particle can also take the future tense marker apo as a prefix to form a negative adverb apega. This construction combines with the irrealis and potential mood across both verbal and non-verbal clauses.

Ex. (4) Negative non-verbal clause in irrealis mood

apega gadiwewe
FUT.NEG rain
'(it will) not rain.'

Ex. (5) Negative verbal clause in irrealis mood

apega toleha-na a-ta-dewa-ya
FUT.NEG feast-DEF 1SG-IRR-make-3SG
'I will not provide the feast.'

==== Intensified negation ====
Negation can be intensified by adopting the condition marker wai- as a suffix to the negative particle ega; however, this construction appears to be limited to the use of response or interjection.

Ex. (6) Intensified negation

ega wai
NEG CON
'no way/definitely not.'

==== Negation of non-verbal clauses ====
As Tawala allows for both verbal and non-verbal clauses, the negative particle will never occur within a clause level noun phrase. For example, if the negative particle were placed between a noun and an adjective, then both would be considered constituents of the clause, with the adjective fulfilling the function of the predicate. The following example illustrates this kind of construction.

Ex. (7) Negation of descriptive clause

bada ega dewadewa-na
man NEG good-3SG
'the man is not good.'

===== Negation of non-verbal clauses: existential clauses =====
Existential clauses are common non-verbal clauses which occur within spoken Tawala, though they only occasionally occur within extended discourse. In Tawala, an existential clause consists of a nominal predicate and can often be negated by the addition of the negative particle that precedes the predicate.

Ex. (8) Negation of existential clause

ega wipoya po ega wayau
NEG hot and NEG cold
'(it is) not hot and (it is) not cold.'

Most negative existential clauses cannot be made positive by simply removing the negative particle; a stative clause would be required instead. The below example illustrates this asymmetry. Ex. (9) Asymmetry of positive and negative existential clauses

ega wipoya > I-wipoya/*wipoya
NEG hot {} 3SG-hot
'(it is) not hot.' '(it is) hot.'

Negative existential clauses are constructed in the irrealis mood when the negative adverb precedes the existential nominal predicate, as shown in example (4).

As mentioned earlier, the negative particle can be taken as the predicate of an existential clause. This construction is used when asking polar questions. The second clause in the following example illustrates its use.

Ex. (10) Negative existential predicate in polar question

he-ne-nei imahi bo eega?
3PL.PRES-DUR-come properly or NEG
'Are they coming properly or not?'

===== Negation of non-verbal clauses: Descriptive clauses =====
Descriptive non-verbal clauses, where an adjective acts as the predicate of the clause, are not often constructed in the negative. In the instances where this does occur, it implies that the negative condition is permanent.

Ex. (11) Negation of descriptive clause

gamogamo ega lupalupa-na
animal NEG flying-3SG
'The animal does not fly.'

===== Negation of non-verbal clauses: possessive clauses =====
As Tawala always places the negative before the predicate and never within a noun phrase, if a negative particle is found between two nouns, it indicates a possessive clause. Compare the example below, which combines an equative and possessive clause.

Ex. (12) Negation of possessive clause

ega Limi natu-na babana Limi ega natu-na
NEG Limi child-3SG because Limi NEG child-3SG
'(That) is not Limi's child because Limi has no child.'

==== Negation of verbal clauses ====
Negation of verbal clauses in Tawala follow the same rules applied to non-verbal clauses: for clauses in the past or present tense, the negative particle precedes the predicate, while the negative tense adverb precedes the predicate for clauses in the future tense. These clauses will either carry the irrealis, potential or hypothetical mood.

Ex. (13) Negative durative irrealis

ega lawa i-ta-hagu-hagu-hi
NEG person 3SG-IRR-DUR-help-3PL
'He doesn't help people.'

Ex. (14) Past irrealis

ega wam i-ta-nei
NEG boat 3SG-IRR-come
'The boat didn't come.'

Ex. (15) Hypothetical

inapa ega u-na-ne-nae apo hi-na-pani-m
HYP NEG 2SG-POT-DUR-go FUT 3PL-POT-tie-2SG
'If you don't go they will imprison you.'

Ex. (16) Negative durative potential

ega u-na-tu-tou
NEG 2SG-POT-DUR-cry
'You don't need to cry.'

Ex. (17) Future potential

apega hi-na-nei
FUT.NEG 3PL-POT-come
'They won't come.'

===== Negation of verbal clauses: prohibitions =====
Prohibitive constructions within Tawala are constructed by placing the negative tense adverb before a verbal predicate, as illustrated in the example below.

Ex (18). Prohibitive command

apega u-na-nae
FUT.NEG 2SG-POT-go
'You must not go.'

== Morphology ==
=== Pronouns ===
Tawala distinguishes three persons: first, second and third. There are only two grammatical numbers, singular and plural, although first person plural makes a distinction between inclusive and exclusive.
Although there are five classes of pronouns in Tawala, only the independent pronoun class should be considered as pronouns proper as they are the only class consisting of free forms. The remaining four classes occur with independent pronouns in a phrase.

==== Independent pronouns ====
Person	Number	
Person	Singular	Plural
1INC	tau	tauta
1EXCL	tau	tauyai
2	tam	taumi
3	tauna	tauhi

==== Subject prefix and object enclitic ====
Subject prefixes and object enclitics attach to a verb to mark person and number of both subject and object respectively.

	1SG	2SG	3SG	1PL.INC	1PL.EXC	2PL	3PL
Object enclitic	-u/we	-m	-ni/ya	-ta	-yai	-mi	-hi
Subject prefix	a-	u-	i-	ta-	to-	o-	hi-

Example: The following example demonstrates the use of some of the above personal pronouns in context.

Tauhi hai mae hi-nonogo-ge-ni.
they their stay 3PL-prepare-TRV-3SG
'They prepared their residence.'

==== Possession ====
Tawala distinguishes alienable and inalienable possession.

===== Possessive pronouns =====
Alienable possession is constructed by a free-standing possessive pronoun that marks the person and number of the possessor.

Person	Number	
Person	Singular	Plural
1INC	u	ata
1EXCL	u	i
2	om	omi
3	a	hai

Example: The following examples demonstrate the use of some of the above personal pronouns in context.

Lawa hai tano hi-dewa-hi.
person POSS.3PL garden 3PL-make-3PL
'The people made their gardens.'

===== Pronominal enclitics =====
Inalienable possession is constructed by attaching a pronominal enclitic to the possessed noun.

Person	Number	
Person	Singular	Plural
1INC	-u/we	-ta
1EXCL	-u/we	-yai
2	-m	-mi
3	-na	-hi

Example: The following example demonstrates the use of some of the above personal pronouns in context.

polo ae-na
pig leg-POSS.3SG
'The pig's leg.'

== Bibliography ==
- Ezard, Bryan (1997). A Grammar of Tawala: An Austronesian Language of the Milne Bay Area, Papua New Guinea. Series C, Volume 137. Canberra: Pacific Linguistics. doi:10.15144/PL-C137. hdl:1885/145950. ISBN 0-85883-458-8.
- Ross, Malcolm (1988). Proto Oceanic and the Austronesian Languages of Western Melanesia. Pacific Linguistics, Series C, No. 98. Canberra: The Australian National University. doi:10.15144/PL-C98. hdl:1885/145428. ISBN 0-85883-367-0.
- Ross, Malcom D. (2004). "Demonstratives, Local Nouns and Directionals in Oceanic Languages: A Diachronic Perspective". In Senft, Gunter (ed.). Deixis and Demonstratives in Oceanic Languages. Pacific Linguistics 562. Canberra: Pacific Linguistics. pp. 175–204. doi:10.15144/PL-562.175. hdl:1885/254214. ISBN 0-85883-551-7.
- "Language Tawala". WALS Online.
