= Mailu language =

Papuan language of Papua New Guinea

Mailu
- Magɨ
- Native to: Papua New Guinea
- Region: Central Province
- Native speakers: (8,500 cited 2000 census)
- Language family: Trans–New Guinea: Mailuan; Mailu

Language codes
- ISO 639-3: mgu
- Glottolog: mail1248

Mailu, or Magi (Magɨ), is a Papuan language of Papua New Guinea.

== Overview ==
Magi is a non-Austronesian language spoken by upwards of 6000 people living on the islands of Mailu, Laluoru, Loupomu and Eunuoro and along the south coast between Cape Rodney and mid-Orangerie Bay of the Central Province of Papua New Guinea. It is often referred to as 'Mailu' as one of the major villages speaking this language is the village of that name on Mailu Island. It is related to the other languages of the Mailuan family (Ma, Laua, Morawa, Neme'a, Domu and Bauwaki whose speakers live or lived inland of this area). Ma and Laua are now extinct.

Magi speakers have for a long time had close contacts and (probably extensive) integration with Austronesian speakers, with the result that there has been a significant adoption of Austronesian vocabulary (around 30–40%, particularly Magori, Gadaisu, Suau, Ouma, Yoba and Bina, of which the last three are now extinct).

In turn, Magori (as well as Yoba, Bina, and Ouma) has received significant influence from Magi.

Magi itself is divided into two main groups of dialects: the eastern (Maisi/Varo) dialects, and the western (Island) dialects.

== Phonology ==
Consonants
		Labial	Alveolar	Palatal	Velar	Glottal
Plosive	voiceless	p	t		k	ʔ
Plosive	voiced	b	d		ɡ	
Fricative		(v)	(s)			
Nasal		m	n			
Liquid			l, (ɾ)			
Approximant		w		j		

- /t/ is used interchangeably with a fricative [s], and was also with an affricate [ts] among older speakers.
- /l, w/ are used interchangeably with sounds [ɾ, v].

Vowels
	Front	Central	Back
High	i		u
Mid	e		o
Low		a	

== See also ==
- Magori language, a nearby mixed Austronesian-Papuan language
