= Molima language =

Austronesian language spoken in Papua New Guinea

Molima
- Salakahadi
- Fagululu
- Native to: Papua New Guinea
- Region: Fergusson Island, Milne Bay Province
- Native speakers: (4,000 cited 2000 census)
- Language family: Austronesian: Malayo-Polynesian; Oceanic; Western Oceanic; Papuan Tip; Nuclear Papuan Tip; North Papuan Mainland – D'Entrecasteaux; Dobu–Duau; Molima
- Dialects: Tola’ai; Ai’alu; Tosila’ai

Language codes
- ISO 639-3: mox
- Glottolog: moli1248

Molima is an Austronesian language spoken in the D'Entrecasteaux Islands of Papua New Guinea.

== Phonology ==
=== Consonants ===
		Labial		Dental/ Alveolar	Palatal	Velar		Glottal	
		plain	lab.	Dental/ Alveolar	Palatal	plain	lab.	plain	lab.
Plosive	voiceless			t̪		k	kʷ	ʔ	ʔʷ
Plosive	voiced	b	bʷ	d̪		ɡ	ɡʷ		
Fricative	voiceless	ɸ	ɸʷ	s				h	
Fricative	voiced	v			ʝ	ɣ			
Nasal		m	mʷ	n̪					
Lateral				l					
Approximant					(j)	w			

- [p] may also occur as an allophone of /ɸ/, or as a result of borrowed words from Dobu, Motu or English.
- /v/ can be weakened as [ʋ] in all environments, in free variation.
- /i/, when preceding a vowel, may also be realized as a semivowel [j].

=== Vowels ===
	Front	Central	Back
Close	i		u
Mid	e		o
Open		a	
