= Lala language (Papua New Guinea) =

Austronesian language spoken in Papua New Guinea

Lala
- Nara
- Region: Eastern New Guinea
- Native speakers: 3,000 (2007)
- Language family: Austronesian: Malayo-Polynesian; Oceanic; Western Oceanic; Papuan Tip; Central Papuan Tip; West Central; Nuclear West Central; Lala

Language codes
- ISO 639-3: nrz
- Glottolog: lala1268

Lala, Nara, or Pokau is an Austronesian language of the central southern coast of the Papuan Peninsula in Papua New Guinea. This language is spoken in the villages of Oloi, Diumana, Ala'ala, Tubu, Kaiau and Vanuamae. A count in 2017 showed there to be about 3000 speakers with a current language status of developing, meaning that the language is in vigorous use, with literature in a standardized form being used by some.

According to Ethnologue the Lala language shares a 57% lexical similarity with the Toura language, and 47% with the Abadi language.

== Culture ==
The coastal surroundings of this land allows for vegetable farms and plenty of animals to be hunted, the wallaby being one notable example. The coast is also utilized for fishing.

== Phonology ==
=== Vowels ===
The Lala language contrasts five vowel qualities. The front vowels are always short, while the back (or non-front) vowels are always long. Hence, the vowels are long /a/, short /e/, short /i/, long /o/, and long /u/. Vowel pairs are au, ei, io, oe, oi, and ou.

=== Consonants ===
The following consonant phonemes are distinctive in the Lala language:

Consonants
	Labial	Dental	Velar	Glottal
Voiceless stops	p	t	k	ʔ
Voiced stops	b	d	g	
Fricactives	v	s		
Nasals	m	n		(h)
Liquids		l		

The fricative /h/ only occurs in the words hosi 'horse' and Hulaha 'Hula people'. Consonants /s/ and /t/ were probably originally pronounced as [ts]. Introduced /s/ can be heard in the name Saka and in sisima 'ship'. Introduced /t/ appears in boti 'boat'.

=== Stress ===
Stress usually falls on the second-to-last syllable of a word. It shifts when a syllable is added to a word. In some words no apparent stress can be heard, except in combination. The stress can also be altered when the word is shouted.

== Morphology ==
=== Tense ===
Simple present, simple past, and present continuous tenses marked on subject person markers. The markers a, o, ka, de, and e are placed after a noun to indicate these three tenses.

Past continuous tense uses the subject person markers lau a'o, oni o'o, i'a' e'o, ita ka'o, lai-lai a'o, oi-oi, i'a de'o. Remote past tense uses the marker ani. Future tense uses the subject markers lau ba, oni bo, i'a be, ita eka, lai-lai ba, oi-oi bo, and i'a be.

=== Affixes ===
Object suffixes are often used with transitive verbs. These object suffixes are u, mu, a, i'a, ta, lai-mai, mu'i. Because the object pronoun usually comes in order after the subject pronoun, the object suffix is sometimes dropped without confusing the meaning. If the object pronoun comes first because of emphasis, the correct object suffix must be used to make the meaning clear.

The causative prefix va- changes a root to a causative verb or noun. An example of this is va'ika 'to show', which is based on the root ika 'to look'.

The nominalizing prefix i- changes words to nouns. An example of this is ivaku 'woven', from vaku 'to weave'.

The prefix vi- does not take the object suffixes and is not used with the causative va-, nor does the duplication of the verb root occur with vi-.

=== Modifiers ===
Negative modifiers are the general negator si'a 'not', asi'i 'no', and asido'o 'not yet'. Verbal modifiers of manner and time are presented in the following two charts.

Verbal modifiers of manner
Lala modifier	English gloss
vaka	also
dokadoka	definitely
maka'imaka'i	slowly, softly, or carefully
kavei	carefully
ali	fast
alimo	fast only
molau	fast
molaumolau	very fast
kaukau	fast
si'asi'a	savagely

Verbal modifiers of time
Lala modifier	English gloss
si'ako	already
melala bounai	always
mealala vaida	sometimes
melala dounamo	often
vali'unai	now
lavi	yesterday
mala	tomorrow
koma	today
avu'avu	tomorrow morning
avu'avuni	this morning

=== Possession ===
The Lala language distinguishes alienable from inalienable possession, the latter of which refers to relatives, parts of the body, and close extensions of the body.

=== Plural forms ===
Some nouns can be pluralized by reduplication. Examples of this are manu 'bird' and manumanu 'birds', and vato 'girl' and vavato 'girls'.

There are exceptions to this rule, for example the reduplicated word ate'ate 'woman' is singular, while the corresponding plural form is simpler a'ate 'women'.

== Syntax ==
The basic constituent order in most sentences follows the structure subject–object–verb.

=== Clause types ===
The following clause types can be distinguished:

- Purpose clause e.g. Motuka itavana ounai lai a da'a tauni. 'We went to the town to buy a truck.' In this sentence the stated purpose is to buy a truck.
- Reason clause e.g. Bo vina'ula kakamu be badu makaumuna. 'Work hard lest your father get cross.' In this sentence the reason is to avoid the father's getting cross.
- Coordinate clause e.g. Da'a sinamu dulu'a. 'Go and help your mother.' In this sentence the two actions of going and helping your mother are conjoined.
- Time clause e.g. Lamu be aku mulinai eka aniva. 'After the rain stops we'll go hunting.' The important word to note in this sentence is 'after'. The use of the word 'after' makes the listener know when the action can or should take place.
