= Diodio language =

Austronesian language spoken in Papua New Guinea

Diodio
- West Goodenough
- Native to: Papua New Guinea
- Region: Milne Bay Province (Goodenough Island)
- Native speakers: (2,200 cited 2000)
- Language family: Austronesian: Malayo-Polynesian; Oceanic; Western Oceanic; Papuan Tip; Nuclear Papuan Tip; North Papuan Mainland – D'Entrecasteaux; Bwaidoga; Diodio

Language codes
- ISO 639-3: ddi
- Glottolog: diod1237

Diodio, or West Goodenough, is an Austronesian language spoken in Milne Bay Province, Papua New Guinea, on Goodenough Island, which it shares with Bwaidoka, Iduna, and Kaninuwa.
