= Goodenough Island =

Island in Papua New Guinea

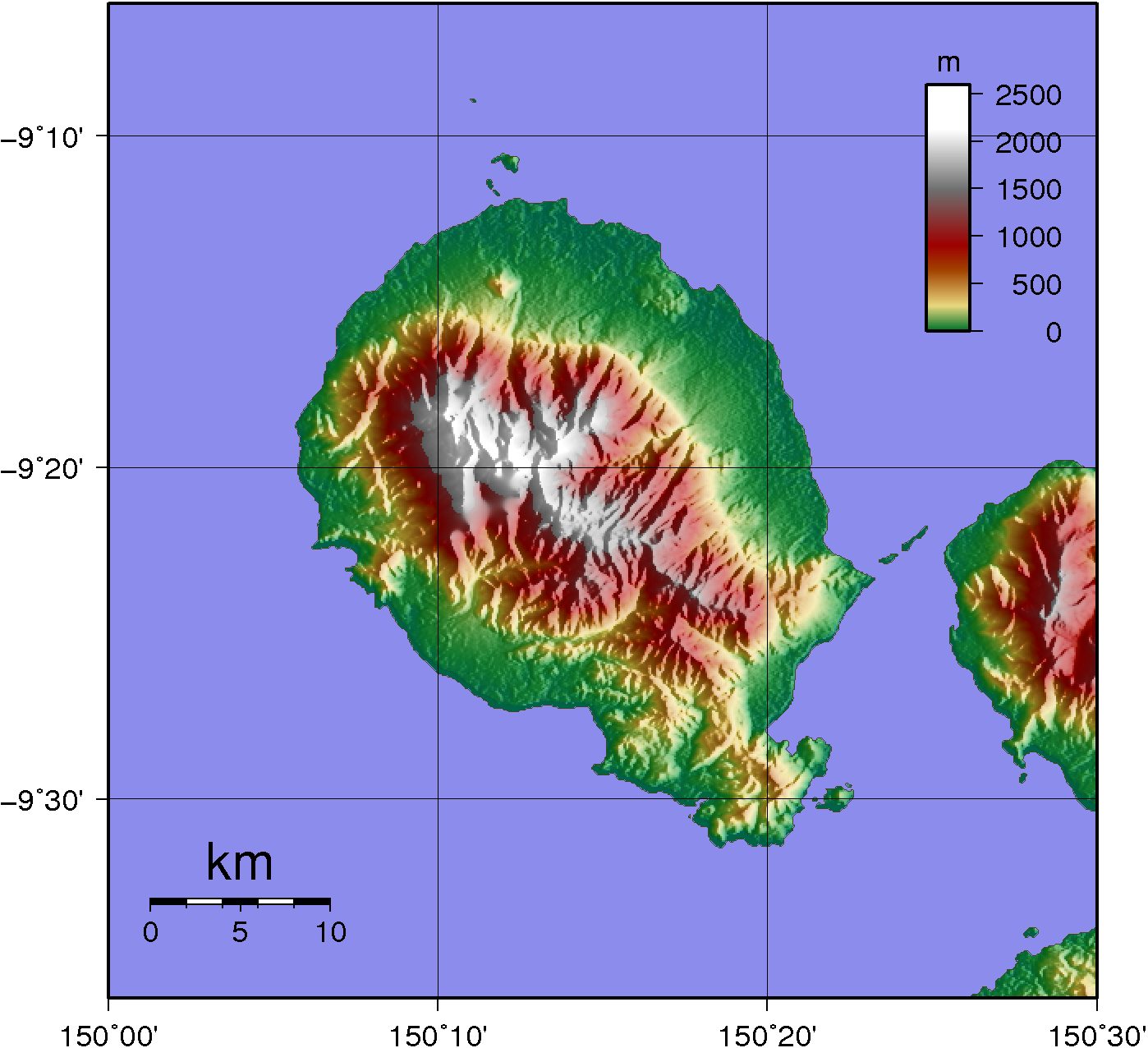

- Location within Papua New Guinea

Geography
- Location: Melanesia
- Coordinates: 9°22′S 150°16′E
- Archipelago: D'Entrecasteaux Islands
- Area: 687 km^{2} (265 sq mi)
- Highest elevation: 2,536 m (8320 ft)
- Highest point: Mount Vineuo

Administration
- Papua New Guinea

Demographics
- Population: 20,814 (2000)

Goodenough Island in the Solomon Sea, also known as Nidula Island, is the westernmost of the three large islands of the D'Entrecasteaux Islands in Milne Bay Province of Papua New Guinea. It lies to the east of mainland New Guinea and southwest of the Trobriand Islands. It is roughly circular in shape, measuring 39 by 26 kilometres (24 by 16 mi) with an area of 687 square kilometres (265 sq mi) and a shoreline of 116 kilometres (72 mi). A coastal belt varying in width from 2 to 10 kilometres (1.2 to 6.2 mi) is covered in grasslands and dissected by streams and coastal swamps. The island rises sharply to the summit of Mount Vineuo, 2,536 metres (8,320 ft) above sea level, making it one of the most precipitous islands in the world. The small outlier Wagifa Island lies to the south-east of the island, and is included within Goodenough's administration.

== Climate and vegetation ==
Like much of New Guinea, the climate is tropical with high temperatures and humidity throughout the year. The northwest monsoon season lasts from December to March and brings sudden rain squalls. From May to October southeasterly winds are cooler and more gentle. Tropical cyclones are infrequent. Rainfall varies between 1,520 mm and 2,540 mm per annum. Serious droughts occur once or twice a decade. Rushing streams with waterfalls drain water from the central mountain. Rain forest cloaks the higher elevations with secondary forest, grassland and native gardens on the lower slopes and coastal plains. Soils are acidic.

A rare edible citrus plant, Citrus wakonai (Citrus warburgiana; locally called "kakamadu", a name shared with other citrus species), grows on Goodenough Island.

== History ==
The D'Entrecasteaux Islands have probably been inhabited for several thousand years, the people being related to mainland Papuans. The first sighting of the archipelago by a European was by the French mariner Joseph Antoine Bruni d'Entrecasteaux in 1792 but it remained unexplored by Europeans until 1874 when Captain John Moresby, commanding HMS Basilisk, landed on the westernmost island and gave it a European name after a British naval colleague, Commodore James Graham Goodenough.

The impact of western culture after Moresby's visit and before World War II was limited to missionaries, ethnographers and traders seeking whales, pearls or gold. In 1888 William MacGregor visited the island in his role as administrator of the newly proclaimed British New Guinea. In 1891 the Methodist Church of Australia established a mission station on Dobu Island (between Ferguson and Normanby Islands) under the direction of William Bromilow. From there mission stations were established in strategic centres in the D'Entrecasteaux and Trobriand Islands and the Louisiade Archipelago. In particular, in 1898 a mission station was established in Bwaidoga, Mud Bay, Goodenough Island. By that time traders had already created a regular demand for steel tools, cloth, and twist tobacco and the Dobu mission was recruiting natives to work in gold mines and copra plantations. These activities, and indeed the farming and hunting activities of the traditional people, were confined to localised areas on the fringing plains of the island. The mountainous hinterland remained entirely unknown and unpopulated above 1,100 m.

=== World War II ===
On 25 August 1942, a Japanese convoy of seven motorised landing craft (MLC) with 353 marines of 5th Sasebo Special Naval Landing Force stopped to rest at the south end of Goodenough Island. They were led by Commander Tsukioka and were bound for Taupota and participation in the Battle of Milne Bay. They became stranded when their MLCs were destroyed by No. 75 Squadron RAAF Kittyhawks.

On 22 October 1942 the Australian warships HMAS Stuart and HMAS Arunta disembarked 640 soldiers consisting of the Australian 2/12th Battalion, of the 18th Brigade from Milne Bay. They landed on both sides of the island's southern tip during the night. Intense fighting occurred during 23 October and during the night a successful rescue mission evacuated about 250 Japanese soldiers by submarine to Fergusson Island, where they were taken by cruiser to Rabaul. The remaining Japanese defenders were mopped up and the island declared secured by 27 October.

The occupation force remained on the island until 28 December 1942. During that time they used deception and camouflage to make the Japanese believe that a brigade sized force was occupying the island. They fabricated a 'ghost force' of dummy structures, including a hospital, anti-aircraft guns constructed of logs pointed at the sky, and barricades of jungle vines which looked like barbed wire. They also lit fires to appear as cooking fires for large numbers of soldiers, and sent messages consistent with what a brigade of soldiers would be expected to send.

During that time an American airfield engineer reported that a temporary airfield could be constructed for emergency use on the site of an existing mission airstrip on the northeastern plain near Vivigani. He also recommended that a permanent 6,000-foot-long (1,800 m) airstrip be constructed.

The Fifth Air Force directed the RAAF's No. 9 Group to attack enemy bases in New Britain. To facilitate this, General Headquarters Operations Instructions No.31, dated 11 March 1943, set out that Goodenough Island, which was garrisoned by an Australian infantry battalion group with attached service groups and two Radar stations, was to be reinforced and prepared as an air force operating base with two landing strips, initially suitable for fighters, but with one being upgraded to handle heavy bombers. The fighter strip was available on 15 June. By the end of July, there were 3,614 RAAF personnel on the island. The bomber strip was completed on 20 October, although it is recorded that the first offensive use of the airfield was on 17 May by Beauforts of No. 100 Squadron RAAF. The bomber strip became operational on 20 October.

As a part of Operation Cartwheel, Vivigani Airfield became an important staging point for Australian and American operations in the South West Pacific Area, an objective of which was to attack Rabaul in New Britain, the stronghold of Imperial Japanese forces.

==== RAAF Units active on Goodenough Island ====
Squadron	Aircraft
6 General reconnaissance/Bomber Squadron	Hudson Beaufort
8 Bomber Squadron	Beaufort
22 Bomber Squadron	Boston
30 Attack Squadron	Beaufighter
75 Fighter Squadron	Kittyhawk
76 Fighter Squadron	Kittyhawk
77 Fighter Squadron	Kittyhawk
79 Fighter Squadron	Spitfire
100 Bomber squadron	Beaufort
8 Communication Unit	Tiger Moth, Boomerang, Dornier Do 24, Vengeance, Walrus, Catalina, Beaufort, Beaufreighter, Beaufighter

==== RAAF logistics units active on Goodenough Island ====
Squadron
4 Mobile Works Squadron. (Renamed 4 Airfield Construction Squadron July 1944)
5 Mobile Works Squadron. (Renamed 5 Airfield Construction Squadron July 1944)
7 Mobile Works Squadron. (Renamed 7 Airfield Construction Squadron July 1944)
26 Air Stores Park
16 Stores Unit. (Renamed 6 Stores and Shipping Unit April 1943)
7 Transportation and Movements Office
10 Repair and Salvage Unit
26 Repair and Salvage Unit
2 Medical Receiving Station
6 Medical Receiving Station

== Culture ==
The four languages of Goodenough (Bwaidoka, Iduna, Diodio, and Buduna or Wataluma) belong to the Milne Bay Family of Austronesian languages. The dominant language, Bwaidoka, was adopted as a lingua franca by the Wesleyan (Methodist) Mission at the turn of the century. At the 2000 census the population was 20,814.

The following is a list of villages working clockwise around Goodenough Island starting at Vivigani Airfield on the northeast coastal plain, as shown in Google Earth:

- Vivigani (this is not an actual village per se, although there are several in the vicinity of the airstrip)
- Bolubolu (the administrative centre)
- Mataita
- Faiava
- Wailagi (United Church mission station and 1–6 Elementary School)
- Wagifa
- Kilia
- Lauwela
- Auwale
- Debenefue
- Diodio
- Tatala
- Waibula
- Ufaufa
- Wataluma Mission and Plantation
- Ulutuya Mission

=== Protected area ===
The Oya Madawa Wildlife Management Area in the centre of the island has an area of 22,840 hectares (56,400 acres). It provides a critical landscape function with a relatively high number of endemic, endangered and vulnerable species. The small black dorcopsis (Dorcopsis atrata), the only wallaby known to be endemic to a Pacific island, is endangered and needs careful management. Another species, the agile wallaby (Macropus agilis), was abundant but cannot be found today.

== See also ==
- Battle of Goodenough Island
- List of volcanoes in Papua New Guinea
- Goodenough Island Rural LLG
