= Mwatebu language =

Austronesian language spoken in Papua New Guinea

Mwatebu
- Native to: Papua New Guinea
- Region: Milne Bay Province
- Native speakers: (120 cited 2000)
- Language family: Austronesian: Malayo-Polynesian; Oceanic; Western Oceanic; Papuan Tip; Nuclear Papuan Tip; North Papuan Mainland – D'Entrecasteaux; Dobu–Duau; Mwatebu

Language codes
- ISO 639-3: mwa
- Glottolog: mwat1237
- ELP: Mwatebu
- Mwatebu is classified as Definitely Endangered by the UNESCO Atlas of the World's Languages in Danger.
- Coordinates: 10.03556°S 151.097717°E

Mwatebu is an Austronesian language spoken in a single village in the D'Entrecasteaux Islands of Papua New Guinea. It is spoken in the single village of Mwatebu (10.03556°S 151.097717°E) in Duau Rural LLG, Milne Bay Province.
