= Duau =

Duau may refer to:

- Duau (god), Ancient Egyptian god
- Duau language of Papua New Guinea
- Duau Rural LLG of Papua New Guinea
