= Bunama language =

Austronesian language spoken in Papua New Guinea

Bunama
- Native to: Papua New Guinea
- Region: Milne Bay Province
- Native speakers: (4,000 cited 1993)
- Language family: Austronesian: Malayo-Polynesian; Oceanic; Western Oceanic; Papuan Tip; Nuclear Papuan Tip; North Papuan Mainland – D'Entrecasteaux; Dobu–Duau; Bunama

Language codes
- ISO 639-3: bdd
- Glottolog: buna1276

Bunama is an Austronesian language spoken in the D'Entrecasteaux Islands of Papua New Guinea.

== Phonology ==
=== Consonants ===
		Labial		Dental/ Alveolar	Palatal	Velar		Glottal	
		plain	lab.	Dental/ Alveolar	Palatal	plain	lab.	plain	lab.
Plosive	vless/asp.	p	pʷ	t̪ʰ				ʔ	ʔʷ
Plosive	voiced	b	bʷ	d		ɡ	ɡʷ		
Fricative				s				h	hʷ
Nasal		m	mʷ	n					
Lateral				ɺ					
Approximant				j		w			

- /p/ can fluctuate to aspirated [pʰ] in stressed syllables.
- /b d ɡ/ can also be heard as [ᵐb ⁿd ᵑɡ] word-initially in stressed syllables.
- /b/ can be heard as a fricative [β] intervocalically in word-medial position.
- /d/ can be heard as a tap [ɾ] intervocalically in word-medial position.
- /s/ can be heard as a more fronted [s̪] in unstressed syllables following vowels /ɛ, a/.
- Prevoicing of the lateral flap [ ̬ɺ] may also occur in initial positions.
- /ɺ/ may also be heard as a retroflex flap [ɽ] depending on the dialect of the speaker. It can also be heard as [ ̬ɽ] when realized as prevoiced in word-initial positions.
- /w/ may fluctuate to a labio-dental [v] among some speakers.
- /j/ may be realized as a dental approximant [ð̞] when before /a/.

=== Vowels ===
	Front	Central	Back
Close	i		ʊ
Mid	ɛ		o
Open		a	

- /a/ is heard as [ɒ] before and after a labialized consonant, or with sounds /w/, /ʔ/. It is also heard as [ʌ] word-medially and word-finally in unstressed syllables.
- /ʊ/ is heard as [ʊ] word-medially and word-finally but never following labialized consonants, or semivowels /w, j/. It is heard as [u] when following sounds /s t̪ʰ/.
- /o/ can be heard as [ɔ] when preceding a glottal stop /ʔ/.
