= Wagifa Island =

Island of Papua New Guinea

- Interactive map of Wagifa Island

Geography
- Coordinates: 9°30′S 150°22′E
- Archipelago: D'Entrecasteaux Islands

Administration
- Papua New Guinea
- Province: Milne Bay
- District: Kiriwina-Goodenough
- LLG: Goodenough Island

Wagifa Island is an island of Papua New Guinea. It is located to the south east of Goodenough Island. A small village is located on the island and aside from fishing, the people only grow limited cassava. As such the primary means of food for local inhabitants comes from trade off the island and at the rural market on Goodenough island. Wagifa Island is entirely volcanic in geological origin.
