= Oa-rove =

Oa-rove' is a deity of unlimited life force and strength. The Roro-speaking tribes of the tip of the Papuan Peninsula tell of him as a shapeshifter. Oa-rove is known as A'aisa and Oa-love by Mekeo-speakers.
