= Maiadomu language =

Austronesian language spoken in Papua New Guinea

Maiadomu
- Native to: Papua New Guinea
- Region: Milne Bay Province (Fergusson Island)
- Native speakers: (900 cited 2000)
- Language family: Austronesian: Malayo-Polynesian; Oceanic; Western Oceanic; Papuan Tip; Nuclear Papuan Tip; North Papuan Mainland – D'Entrecasteaux; Bwaidoga; Maiadomu

Language codes
- ISO 639-3: mzz
- Glottolog: maia1251

Maiadomu is an Austronesian language spoken in Milne Bay Province of Papua New Guinea.
