= Toura language =

Toura may be:

- Toura language (Ivory Coast)
- Toura language (Papua New Guinea)
