= Kilivila language =

Austronesian language spoken in Papua New Guinea

Kilivila
- Native to: Papua New Guinea
- Region: Trobriand Islands
- Native speakers: (20,000 cited 2000)
- Language family: Austronesian: Malayo-Polynesian; Oceanic; Western Oceanic; Papuan Tip; Kilivila–Misima; Kilivila languages; Kilivila

Language codes
- ISO 639-3: kij
- Glottolog: kili1267

Kilivila (Kiriwina) is one of the Kilivila–Louisiades languages (of the Austronesian language family), spoken by the Trobriand people of the Trobriand Islands (Papua New Guinea). It is used in local schools.

== Phonology ==
Phonology of Kilivila:

=== Consonants ===
		Labial		Alveolar	Palatal	Velar		Glottal
		plain	lab.	Alveolar	Palatal	plain	lab.	Glottal
Plosive	voiceless	p	pʷ	t		k	kʷ	ʔ
Plosive	voiced	b	bʷ	d		ɡ	ɡʷ	
Nasal		m	mʷ	n				
Fricative		v		s				
Rhotic				ɾ				
Approximant				l	j		w	

=== Vowels ===
	Front	Central	Back
High	i		u
Mid	ɛ		ɔ
Low		a	

=== Allophones ===
	Allophone
/k/	[k̠], [x̠], [k], [x]
/kʷ/	[kʷ], [k̠ʷ]
/s/	[s], [ʃ]
/m/	[m], [m̩]
/ɾ/	[ɾ], [r], [ʀ]
/i/	[i], [ɨ]
/u/	[u], [ʊ]
