= SNC =

SNC may refer to:

== Politics ==
- Solidarity National Committee of the American Solidarity Party
- The Syrian National Council, an opposition coalition
- National Coalition for Syrian Revolutionary and Opposition Forces or Syrian National Coalition
- Sahrawi National Council of the Sahrawi Arab Democratic Republic

== Companies and organizations ==
- Satellite News Channel, former US cable channel
- Sierra Nevada Corporation, a US aerospace company
- Sierra Nevada College, a US university
- St Norbert College, De Pere, Wisconsin, US
- AtkinsRéalis, a Canadian engineering firm formerly trading as SNC-Lavalin
- Air Cargo Carriers ICAO code
- Soda Nikka Co., Ltd. - Japanese chemical company

== Science and technology ==
- SNC Meteorites
- SNC, collective term for the three scientific journals Science, Nature and Cell
- Secure Network Communications, an SAP protocol
- Selective Nef complex in mathematics
- SAP Supply Network Collaboration, SAP business software
- Substantia nigra pars compacta, or SNc, a region of the brain

== Transport ==
- Air Cargo Carriers ICAO code
- General Ulpiano Paez Airport, IATA code
- Chester Airport, FAA code
- Curtiss-Wright CW-22 aircraft, US Navy name

== Other uses ==
- Società in nome collettivo (S.n.c.), a general partnership in Italian corporate law
- Single national curriculum, Pakistan
- Sinaugoro language of Papua New Guinea, ISO 639-3 code
- National Culture Week of Burkina Faso (Semaine Nationale de la Culture)
