= Dobu (disambiguation) =

Dobu may refer to:

- Dobu (film)
- Dobu Island, in Papua New Guinea, or the people of Dobu
- Dobu language
- 2,5-Dimethoxy-4-butylamphetamine
