= Sudest language =

Austronesian language spoken in Papua New Guinea

Sudest
- Tagula
- Region: Tagula Island, Milne Bay Province, Papua New Guinea
- Native speakers: (2,000 cited 1987)
- Language family: Austronesian: Malayo-Polynesian; Oceanic; Western; Papuan Tip; Nimoa–Sudest; Sudest

Language codes
- ISO 639-3: tgo
- Glottolog: sude1239

Sudest, also known as Tagula, is an Oceanic language of Papua New Guinea.

== Name ==
The name Sudest is a word meaning 'southeast' in French or Italian.

== Phonology ==
=== Consonants ===
| | | Labial | | Dental/ Alveolar | Palatal | Velar | |
| | | plain | lab. | Dental/ Alveolar | Palatal | plain | lab. |
|---|---|---|---|---|---|---|---|
| Plosive | voiceless | p | pʷ | t | | k | kʷ |
| Plosive | voiced | b | bʷ | d | ɟ | ɡ | ɡʷ |
| Plosive | prenasal | ᵐb | ᵐbʷ | ⁿd | ᶮɟ | ᵑɡ | ᵑɡʷ |
| Fricative | voiced | β | βʷ | ð | | ɣ | ɣʷ |
| Fricative | voiceless | | | s | | | |
| Nasal | | m | mʷ | n | ɲ | ŋ | ŋʷ |
| Rhotic | | | | r | | | |
| Lateral | | | | l | | | |
| Approximant | | | | | j | | w |

- /ɣ/ is heard as a glottal [h] before /o/ or /u/.
- /ɣʷ/ is heard as [hʷ], in free variation within different dialects.
- /β, βʷ/ are originally bilabial, although many speakers under the influence of English pronounce them as labio-dental [v, vʷ].

=== Vowels ===
| | Front | Central | Back |
|---|---|---|---|
| Close | i | | u |
| Mid | e | ə | o |
| Open | | a | |
