= YML =

YML or yml may refer to:

- Charlevoix Airport, in Quebec, Canada, IATA code YML
- .yml, a file extension for the YAML file format
- Yamalele language, ISO 639-3 languagec code yml
