= Duau language =

Austronesian language spoken in Papua New Guinea

Duau
- Native to: Papua New Guinea
- Region: Milne Bay Province
- Native speakers: 5,000 (2004)
- Language family: Austronesian: Malayo-Polynesian; Oceanic; Western Oceanic; Papuan Tip; Nuclear Papuan Tip; North Papuan Mainland – D'Entrecasteaux; Dobu–Duau; Duau
- Dialects: Dawada; Guleguleu; Mwalukwasia; Siausi; Somwadina

Language codes
- ISO 639-3: dva
- Glottolog: duau1237

Duau is a dialectically diverse Austronesian language spoken in the D'Entrecasteaux Islands of Papua New Guinea. It is spoken in Duau Rural LLG.
