= DGG =

DGG may refer to:

- Deutsche Geophysikalische Gesellschaft, a society for geophysics
- Deutsche Grammophon Gesellschaft, a record label
- Discrete Global Grid
- Disney Games Group, the video game division of The Walt Disney Company
- Domestic & General, London Stock Exchange ticker code
- Dutch Game Garden an organization with the aim of promoting and improving the video games industry in the Netherlands
- Red Dog Airport (FAA location identifier: DGG), an airport in Alaska
- Destiny.gg, the website of streamer Destiny, also used as a metonym for his fanbase

== See also ==
- Doga language (ISO 639 code: dgg), a language of Papua New Guinea
