= GRW =

GRW may refer to:

- Gary Railway, an American rail company
- Ghirardi–Rimini–Weber theory, in quantum mechanics
- Graciosa Airport, on Graciosa Island, the Azores
- Gujranwala railway station, in Gujranwala, Pakistan
- Gweda language, an Austronesian language
