= Suau language =

Austronesian language spoken in Papua New Guinea

Suau
- Iou
- Region: Milne Bay Province, Papua New Guinea
- Native speakers: (7,810 cited 2000 census); L2 speakers: 13,000 (2021)
- Language family: Austronesian: Malayo-Polynesian; Oceanic; Western; Papuan Tip; Nuclear; Suauic; Suau

Language codes
- ISO 639-3: swp
- Glottolog: suau1242

Suau, also known as Iou, is an Oceanic language spoken in the Milne Bay Province of Papua New Guinea. It is spoken by 6,800 people and a further 14,000 as a lingua franca.

== Phonology ==
Consonant sounds
| | | Labial | Alveolar | Velar | Glottal |
|---|---|---|---|---|---|
| Plosive | voiceless | p | t | k | ʔ |
| Plosive | voiced | b | d | g | |
| Nasal | | m | n | | |
| Fricative | | (f) | s | | h |
| Lateral | | | l | | |
| Glide | | w | | j | |

- Some village dialects also include a fricative sound [f].
- /l/ can also be heard as a flap [ɾ] in free variation.
- /w/ may also rarely be pronounced as [v, β] among speakers.

Vowel sounds
| | Front | Central | Back |
|---|---|---|---|
| High | i | | u |
| Mid | e | | o |
| Low | | a | |
