= SEW =

SEW or sew may refer to:

- Search Engine Watch, digital marketing blog
- Segregated early weaning, a practice in pig farming
- Sozialistische Einheitspartei Westberlins, a communist party in West Berlin
- Skyward Express, the ICAO code SEW
- Sewa Bay language, the ISO 639-3 code sew
- Sirocco Engineering Works
- Simple English Wikipedia
- Sewing
