= Unubahe language =

Austronesian language spoken in Papua New Guinea

Unubahe
- Native to: Papua New Guinea
- Region: Milne Bay Province
- Native speakers: 7 fluent (2001 survey); 59 total with any ability (2001)
- Language family: Austronesian: Malayo-Polynesian; Oceanic; Western; Papuan Tip; Nuclear; Suauic; Unubahe

Language codes
- ISO 639-3: unu
- Glottolog: unub1234

Unubahe (Unuba'e) is a nearly extinct Oceanic language spoken at the southeastern tip of Papua New Guinea. Although a few children speak it, in 2001 there was only one married couple who both spoke the language.
