= Kaninuwa language =

Austronesian language spoken in Papua New Guinea

Kaninuwa
- Wataluma
- Kaokao
- Native to: Papua New Guinea
- Region: Goodenough Island
- Native speakers: (360 cited 2001)
- Language family: Austronesian: Malayo-Polynesian; Oceanic; Western; Papuan Tip; Kilivila – Nuclear Papuan Tip; Are–Taupota; Are; Kaninuwa

Language codes
- ISO 639-3: wat
- Glottolog: kani1281
- ELP: Kaninuwa

Kaninuwa, or Wataluma, is a major Oceanic language of Goodenough Island, Papua New Guinea.

== Alphabet ==
Kaninuwa has 23 letters (A/a, B/b, Bw/bw, D/d, E/e, F/f, Fw/fw, G/g, Gw/gw, Ḡ/ḡ, I/i, K/k, Kw/kw, M/m, Mw/mw, N/n, O/o, S/s, T/t, U/u, V/v, W/w, Y/y).
