= Yoba language =

Extinct Austronesian language of Papua New Guinea

Yoba
- Native to: Papua New Guinea
- Region: Central Province
- Extinct: 1980s
- Language family: Austronesian: Malayo-Polynesian; Oceanic; Western Oceanic; Papuan Tip; Central; Oumic; Magoric; Yoba

Language codes
- ISO 639-3: yob
- Glottolog: yoba1237

Yoba is an extinct Austronesian language of Papua New Guinea. It was restructured through contact with neighboring Papuan languages, and in turn influencing them, before speakers shifted to those languages.

== See also ==
- Magori language, a similar situation
