= Boselewa language =

Austronesian language spoken in Papua New Guinea

Boselewa
- Native to: Papua New Guinea
- Region: Fergusson Island, Milne Bay Province
- Ethnicity: 880 ethnic population (2011 census)
- Native speakers: 880 (2011 census)
- Language family: Austronesian: Malayo-Polynesian; Oceanic; Western Oceanic; Papuan Tip; Nuclear Papuan Tip; North Papuan Mainland – D'Entrecasteaux; Dobu–Duau; Boselewa

Language codes
- ISO 639-3: bwf
- Glottolog: bose1237
- ELP: Boselewa
- Boselewa is classified as Vulnerable by the UNESCO Atlas of the World's Languages in Danger.

Boselewa is a small Austronesian language spoken in the D'Entrecasteaux Islands of Papua New Guinea.
