= Doura language =

Doura may be:

- Tura language
- Toura language (Papua New Guinea)
