= Nimoa =

Nimoa may be,

- Nimoa Island
- Nimoa language
