= Dobu language =

Austronesian language spoken in Papua New Guinea

Dobu
- Dobuan
- Native to: Papua New Guinea
- Region: Milne Bay Province, tip of Cape Vogel
- Native speakers: (10,000 cited 1998); 60% monolingual L2 speakers: 51,000 (2021)
- Language family: Austronesian: Malayo-Polynesian; Oceanic; Western Oceanic; Papuan Tip; Nuclear Papuan Tip; North Papuan Mainland – D'Entrecasteaux; Dobu–Duau; Dobu
- Writing system: Latin script (Dobuan alphabet); Dobuan Braille

Language codes
- ISO 639-3: dob
- Glottolog: dobu1241

Dobu or Dobuan is an Austronesian language spoken in Milne Bay Province of Papua New Guinea. It is a lingua franca for 100,000 people in D'Entrecasteaux Islands.

== Phonology ==
=== Consonants ===
		Labial		Alveolar	Palatal	Velar		Glottal	
		plain	lab.	Alveolar	Palatal	plain	lab.	plain	lab.
Plosive	voiceless	p	pʷ	t		k	kʷ	ʔ	ʔʷ
Plosive	voiced	b	bʷ	d		ɡ	ɡʷ		
Fricative				s					
Nasal		m	mʷ	n					
Flap				ɺ					
Approximant					j	w			

- Sounds /p, t, k/ may also be aspirated in free variation as [pʰ, tʰ, kʰ] in all environments.
- The lateral flap /ɺ/ may fluctuate with an alveolar vibrant flap [ɾ] depending on the dialect of the speaker.
- /j/ may also fluctuate with a fricative [ʝ] within vocabulary.

=== Vowels ===
	Front	Central	Back
Close	i		u
Mid	ɛ		ɔ
Open		a	

- /a/ may be heard as [ʌ] in unstressed syllables.
- /ɔ/ may be heard as slightly more centralized [ɔ̽] when following labialized consonants in unstressed positions.
- /u/ may be heard as [ʊ] in unstressed syllables.
