= Bina language (Papua New Guinea) =

Language spoken in Papua New Guinea

Bina
- Native to: Papua New Guinea
- Region: Central Province
- Extinct: Late 20th century
- Language family: Austronesian: Malayo-Polynesian; Oceanic; Western Oceanic; Papuan Tip; Central; Oumic; Magoric; Bina

Language codes
- ISO 639-3: bmn
- Glottolog: bina1271

Bina is an extinct Austronesian language of Papua New Guinea. It was restructured through contact with neighboring Papuan languages, and it turn influencing them, before speakers shifted to those languages.

== See also ==
- Magori language, a similar situation
