= Arifama-Miniafia language =

Austronesian language spoken in Papua New Guinea

Arifama
- Miniafia
- Native to: Papua New Guinea
- Region: Oro Province
- Native speakers: (3,500 cited 2000)
- Language family: Austronesian: Malayo-Polynesian; Oceanic; Western; Papuan Tip; Kilivila – Nuclear Papuan Tip; Are–Taupota; Are; Arifama

Language codes
- ISO 639-3: aai
- Glottolog: arif1239
- ELP: Arifama-Miniafia

Arifama and Miniafia (Miniafia Oyan) are dialects of an Oceanic language of Oro Province, Papua New Guinea.
