= Galeya language =

Austronesian language spoken in Papua New Guinea

Galeya
- Garea
- Native to: Papua New Guinea
- Region: Milne Bay Province
- Native speakers: (2,600 cited 2000 census)
- Language family: Austronesian: Malayo-Polynesian; Oceanic; Western Oceanic; Papuan Tip; Nuclear Papuan Tip; North Papuan Mainland – D'Entrecasteaux; Dobu–Duau; Galeya

Language codes
- ISO 639-3: gar
- Glottolog: gale1257

Galeya (Garea) is a dialectically diverse Austronesian language spoken in the D'Entrecasteaux Islands of Papua New Guinea.
