= Ouma language =

Extinct language formerly spoken in Papua New Guinea

Ouma
- Native to: Papua New Guinea
- Region: Central Province
- Extinct: Late 1980s
- Language family: Austronesian: Malayo-Polynesian; Oceanic; Western Oceanic; Papuan Tip; Central; Oumic; Ouma

Language codes
- ISO 639-3: oum
- Glottolog: ouma1237
- ELP: Ouma

Ouma is an extinct Austronesian language of Papua New Guinea. It was restructured through contact with neighboring Papuan languages, and it turn influencing them, before speakers shifted to those languages.

== See also ==
- Magori language, a similar situation
