= BXH =

BXH or bxh may refer to:

- BXH, the IATA code for Balkhash Airport, Kazakhstan
- BXH, the National Rail station code for Bexleyheath railway station, London, England
- bxh, the ISO 639-3 code for Buhutu language, Milne Bay Province, Papua New Guinea
