= Kuni language =

Malayo-Polynesian language of Papua New Guinea

Kuni
- Region: Eastern New Guinea
- Native speakers: (2,400 cited 2000 census)
- Language family: Austronesian: Malayo-Polynesian; Oceanic; Western Oceanic; Papuan Tip; Central Papuan Tip; West Central; Nuclear West Central; Kuni

Language codes
- ISO 639-3: kse
- Glottolog: kuni1263

Kuni is a Malayo-Polynesian languages of the central southern coast of the Papuan Peninsula in Papua New Guinea.
