= Iduna language =

Austronesian language spoken in Papua New Guinea

Iduna
- Vivigani
- Native to: Papua New Guinea
- Region: Milne Bay Province (Goodenough Island)
- Native speakers: (6,000 cited 1984)
- Language family: Austronesian: Malayo-Polynesian; Oceanic; Western Oceanic; Papuan Tip; Nuclear Papuan Tip; North Papuan Mainland – D'Entrecasteaux; Bwaidoga; Iduna

Language codes
- ISO 639-3: viv
- Glottolog: idun1242

Iduna is an Austronesian language spoken on Goodenough Island of Milne Bay Province of Papua New Guinea.

== Phonology ==
=== Consonants ===
The inventory of the Iduna language consists of 14 consonant phonemes.

		Labial	Dental	Palatal	Velar	Glottal
Plosive	Voiceless		t		k	ʔ
Plosive	Voiced	b	d		g	
Fricative	Voiceless	f				
Fricative	Voiced	v				
Nasal		m	n			
Approximant			l	j	w	h

Voiced plosives generally contrast with their unvoiced counterparts, except for the bilabial series, where /b/ varies freely between [b] and [p]. Moreover, the phoneme /g/ is commonly realized as [g], though for some speakers it may be pronounced as a voiced fricative [ɣ] without contrast. Finally, /t/ has also two allophonic realizations: [t] occurs word-initially and word-medially before non-front vowels /a/, /o/ or /u/, whereas [s] only appears before front vowels /i/ or /e/. Other minor allophonic realizations may occur. Among these variations only the last one is reflected in the orthography.

Phoneme	Allophones	Context
/b/	[b ~ p], [bʷ]	free variant; [bʷ] before non-syllabic /u/
/f/	[f], [fʷ]	Normally [f]; [fʷ] before non-syllabic /u/
/k/	[k], [kʷ]	Normally [k]; [kʷ] before non-syllabic /u/
/g/	[g ~ ɣ], [gʷ]	free variant; [gʷ] before non-syllabic /u/
/t/	[t], [s]	[s] before /i/ and /e/; [t] elsewhere
/d/	[d], [tʰ]	[tʰ] before /i/ in final syllable position only; [d] elsewhere
/m/	[m], [mʷ]	Normally [m]; [mʷ] before non-syllabic /u/

=== Vowels ===
There are five vowel phonemes in Iduna.

	Front	Central	Back
High	i		u
Mid	ɛ		ɔ
Low		a	

Vowels have allophones too. The major allophonic variations are described in the following table. These include the double realization of /a/, which corresponds to [a] when found in stressed syllables, while it approximates [ʌ] in unstressed environments, and the nasal allophonic variant of /u/.

Phoneme	Allophone	Context
/a/	[a], [ʌ]	[a] in stressed syllable; [ʌ] elsewhere
/u/	[u], [ũ]	[ũ] following /m/; [u] elsewhere

The language also has four monomoraic diphthongs: /ai/, /au/, /ao/ and /oi/. These are distinguished from vowel sequences, which instead are bimoraic, e.g. the word giyauna [gi.jau.nʌ] 'he scrapes it' contrasts with giyauna [gi.ja.u.nʌ] 'he unties it'.

=== Phonotactics ===
In Iduna consonant clusters are forbidden; therefore, there are only open syllables of type V, CV and CVV. Also, the special kind of sequence CuV is generally interpreted as CʷV.

== Writing system ==
The Iduna alphabet is shown in the following table:

A a	B b	D d	E e	F f	G g	H h	I i	L l
[a]	[b]	[d]	[ɛ]	[f]	[g]	[h]	[i]	[l]
M m	O o	S s	T t	U u	V v	W w	Y y	ʼ
[m]	[ɔ]	[s]	[t]	[u]	[v]	[w]	[j]	[ʔ]
