= MVN =

MVN or mvn may refer to:

- The multivariate normal distribution, which generalises the normal distribution to multiple variables.
- Bruno Covas/Mendes-Vila Natal (CPTM) (Station code: MVN), a train station in Grajaú, São Paulo, Brazil
- Minaveha language (ISO 639-3: mvn), an Oceanic language of Fergusson Island in Milne Bay Province, Papua New Guinea
- Mount Vernon Airport (IATA: MVN), a civil public use airport in Jefferson County, Illinois, United States
- MVN University, a private university in Delhi-NCR, Haryana, India
- Apache Maven, a software build automation tool
