= HGW =

HGW may refer to:

- Haigwai language, spoken in Papua New Guinea
- Home gateway, an IP networking device in a residence
- Hyperquenched glassy water
- Hauptmann Gerd Wiesler, a main character in the film The Lives of Others
