= Muyuw language =

Austronesian language spoken in Papua New Guinea

Muyuw
- Region: Eastern New Guinea
- Native speakers: (6,000 cited 1998)
- Language family: Austronesian: Malayo-Polynesian; Oceanic; Western Oceanic; Papuan Tip; Kilivila–Misima; Kilivila; Muyuw

Language codes
- ISO 639-3: myw
- Glottolog: muyu1244

Muyuw language (Egum, Murua, Murua Dukwayasi, Murua Kaulae, Muruwa, Muyu, Muyua, Muyuwa) is one of the Kilivila–Louisiades languages (of the Austronesian language family), spoken on the Woodlark Islands, in the Solomon Sea within Papua New Guinea.

As of 1998, the number of speakers is 6,000, 3,000 of whom are monolinguals. Speakers also use Dobu, Kilivila or Misima-Paneati. Latin script is used.

Dialects include Yanaba, Lougaw (Gawa), Wamwan, Nawyem, and Iwa. The Iwa dialect is transitional between Muyuw and Kilivila. Its lexical similarity with Kilivila is 68%.

== Phonology ==
Phonology of the Muyuw language:

=== Consonants ===
		Labial		Alveolar	Palatal	Velar	
		plain	lab.	Alveolar	Palatal	plain	lab.
Plosive	voiceless	p	pʷ	t		k	kʷ
Plosive	voiced	b	bʷ	d		ɡ	ɡʷ
Nasal		m	mʷ				
Fricative		v		s			
Lateral				l			
Approximant		w			j		

=== Vowels ===
	Front	Central	Back	
Close	i		u	
Close-mid	e		o	
Open-mid	ɛ		ʌ	ɔ
Open		a		
