= Galeya =

Galeya may be,

- Galeya language
- Abhin Galeya, British stage and screen actor
