= Sewa Bay language =

Austronesian language spoken in Papua New Guinea

Sewa Bay
- Native to: Papua New Guinea
- Region: Milne Bay Province
- Native speakers: (1,520 cited 1972 census)
- Language family: Austronesian: Malayo-Polynesian; Oceanic; Western Oceanic; Papuan Tip; Nuclear Papuan Tip; North Papuan Mainland – D'Entrecasteaux; Dobu–Duau; Sewa Bay

Language codes
- ISO 639-3: sew
- Glottolog: sewa1251

Sewa Bay, or Duau Pwata, is a dialectically diverse Austronesian language spoken in the D'Entrecasteaux Islands of Papua New Guinea. Its dialects are Miadeba, Bwakera, Maiabare, Darubia, Sewataitai, Sibonai and Central Sewa Bay. It is spoken in Milne Bay province: center of Normanby island, Sewa Bay area.
