= NRZ =

NRZ or nrz may refer to:

- Lala language (Papua New Guinea) (ISO 639-3 code)
- National Railways of Zimbabwe
- Neue Rheinische Zeitung, a newspaper published by Karl Marx
- Neue Ruhr Zeitung, a regional German newspaper
- Non-return-to-zero, an encoding technique
