= Bwanabwana =

Suau may refer to:

- Bwanabwana language of Papua New Guinea
- Bwanabwana Rural LLG of Papua New Guinea
