= Ubir language =

Austronesian language spoken in Papua New Guinea

Ubir
- Native to: Papua New Guinea
- Region: Oro Province
- Native speakers: (2,600 cited 2000 census)
- Language family: Austronesian: Malayo-Polynesian; Oceanic; Western; Papuan Tip; Kilivila – Nuclear Papuan Tip; Are–Taupota; Are; Ubir

Language codes
- ISO 639-3: ubr
- Glottolog: ubir1237

Ubir (Kubiri) is an Oceanic language of Oro Province, Papua New Guinea.
