= Oyaʼoya language =

Austronesian language spoken in Papua New Guinea

Oyaʼoya
- Native to: Papua New Guinea
- Region: Milne Bay Province
- Native speakers: 380 (2005)
- Language family: Austronesian: Malayo-Polynesian; Oceanic; Western; Papuan Tip; Nuclear; Suauic; Oyaʼoya

Language codes
- ISO 639-3: oyy
- Glottolog: oyao1237

Oyaʼoya is an Oceanic dialect cluster spoken at the tip of the Papuan Peninsula in Papua New Guinea.
