= Nada language =

Nada may be:

- Buyang language, a Tai–Kadai language spoken in Guangnan and Funing counties, Yunnan Province, China by the Buyang people
- Budibud language, one of the Kilivila languages (of the Austronesian language family), spoken on the tiny Lachlan Islands, east of Woodlark Island in Papua New Guinea
