= Mount Vineuo =

Mountain in Papua New Guinea

- Mount Oiautukekea
- Location within Papua New Guinea

Highest point
- Elevation: 2,536 m (8,320 ft)
- Prominence: 2,536 m (8,320 ft)
- Listing: Ultra, Ribu
- Coordinates: 9°20′03″S 150°12′21″E

Geography
- Location: Goodenough Island, Papua New Guinea

Mount Vineuo, also known as Mount Oiautukekea, is a mountain on Goodenough Island, Papua New Guinea. The mountain is 2,536 metres (8,320 ft) above sea level. The mountain is the highest peak in the D'Entrecasteaux Islands.

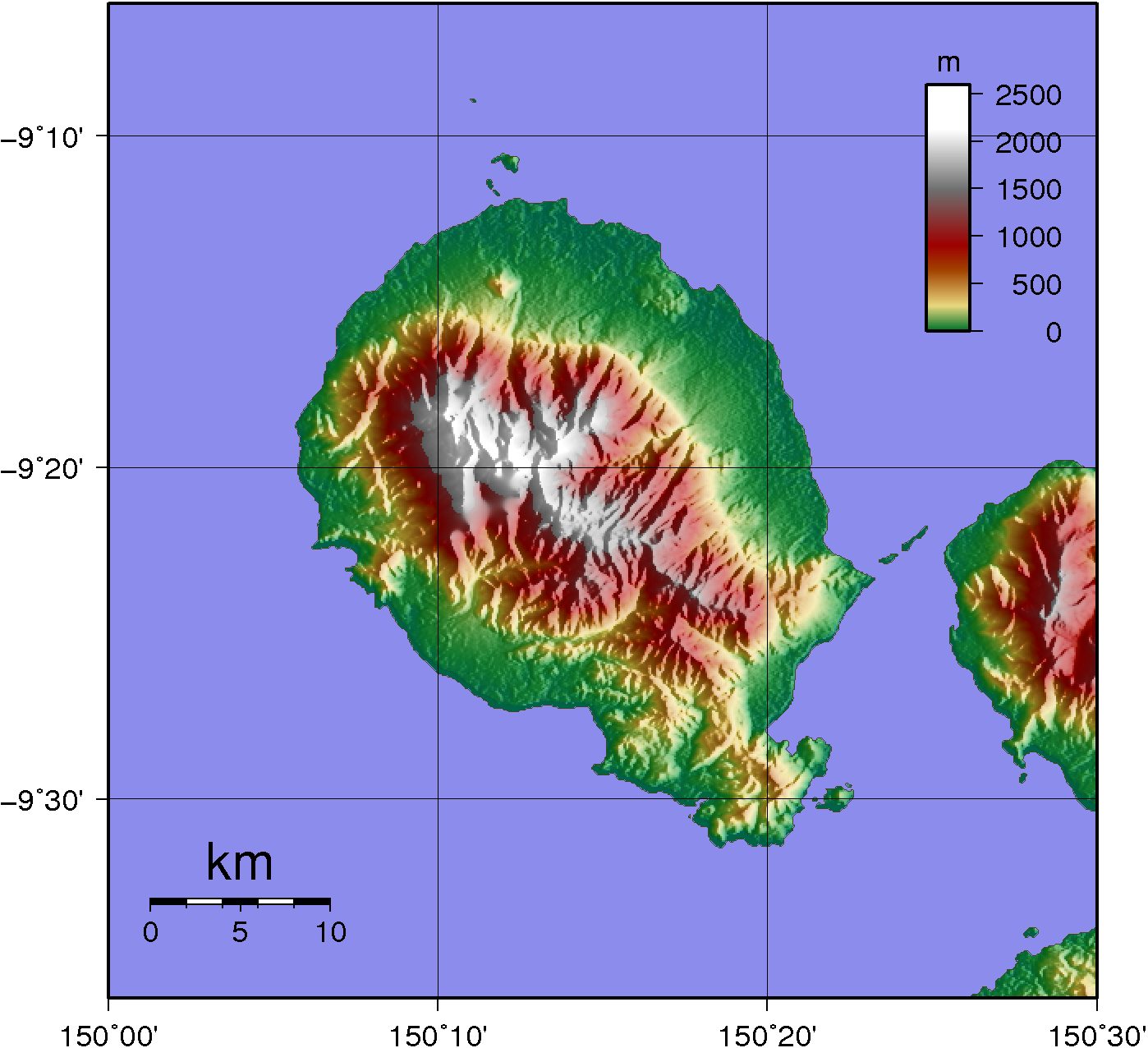
Mt. Vineuo represented on a Goodenough Island topography map.

== See also ==
- List of ultras of Oceania
- List of islands by highest point
- Battle of Goodenough Island
