= Minaveha language =

Austronesian language spoken in Papua New Guinea

Minaveha
- Kukuya
- Native to: Papua New Guinea
- Region: Milne Bay Province
- Native speakers: 2,300 (2007)
- Language family: Austronesian: Malayo-Polynesian; Oceanic; Western Oceanic; Papuan Tip; Nuclear Papuan Tip; North Mainland – D'Entrecasteaux; Taupota languages; Minaveha

Language codes
- ISO 639-3: mvn
- Glottolog: mina1269

Minaveha, or Kukuya, is an Oceanic language of Fergusson Island in Milne Bay Province, Papua New Guinea.
