= Papuan Tip languages =

Branch of the Western Oceanic languages

Papuan Tip
- Geographic distribution: Eastern New Guinea
- Linguistic classification: Austronesian: Malayo-Polynesian; Oceanic; Western Oceanic; Papuan Tip
- Proto-language: Proto-Papuan Tip
- Subdivisions: Nuclear Papuan Tip; Suauic; North Mainland – D'Entrecasteaux; Peripheral Papuan Tip; Kilivila–Misima; Nimoa–Sudest; Central Papuan Tip

Language codes
- ISO 639-3: –
- Glottolog: papu1253
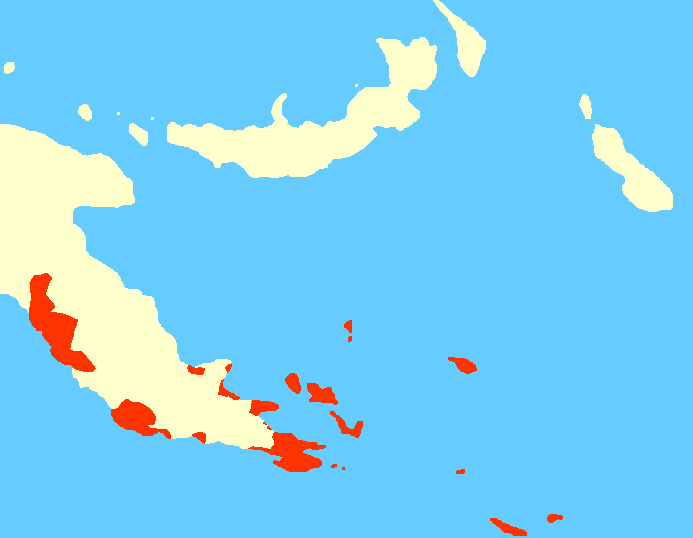

The Papuan Tip languages are a branch of the Western Oceanic languages consisting of 60 languages.

== Contact ==
All Papuan Tip languages, except Nimoa, Sudest, and the Kilivila languages (all spoken on islands off the coast of mainland Papua New Guinea), have subject–object–verb (SOV) word order due to influences from nearby Papuan languages (Lynch, Ross, & Crowley 2002:104). Universally, this is considered to be a typologically unusual change. Since these non-Austronesian influences can be reconstructed for Proto-Papuan Tip, they did not simply result from recent contact among individual daughter languages.

== Languages ==
According to Lynch, Ross, & Crowley (2002), the structure of the family is as follows:

- Nuclear Papuan Tip linkage
  - Suauic linkage: Buhutu, 'Auhelawa, Oya'oya, Unubahe, Saliba, Suau, Bwanabwana, Wagawaga
  - North Mainland – D'Entrecasteaux linkage
    - Anuki
    - Gumawana
    - Bwaidoga: Bwaidoka, Diodio (West Goodenough), Iamalele, Iduna, Koluwawa, Maiadomu
    - Dobu–Duau: Dobu, Molima, Bunama, Boselewa, Duau, Galeya, Mwatebu, Sewa Bay
    - Kakabai: Dawawa, Kakabai
    - Are–Taupota
      - Are: Are, Arifama-Miniafia, Doga, Gapapaiwa, Ghayavi, Kaninuwa, Ubir
      - Taupota: Gweda, Haigwai, Maiwala, Minaveha, Taupota, Tawala, Wa'ema, Wedau, Yakaikeke
- Kilivila–Misima linkage
  - Kilivila family: Budibud, Kilivila, Muyuw
  - Misima language
- Nimoa–Sudest family: Nimoa, Sudest
- Central Papuan Tip family
  - Oumic: Magoric (Magori, Yoba, Bina), Ouma
  - Sinagoro–Keapara: Hula–Keapara, Sinaugoro
  - West Central Papuan Tip
    - Motu
    - Abadi
    - Nuclear West Central Papuan Tip: Toura, Kuni, Mekeo, Lala, Waima

Maisin is difficult to classify, but its Austronesian component likely belongs with Nuclear Papuan Tip. Yele has recently been tentatively classified as closest to Nimoa–Sudest, while others classify it as a Papuan language.
