= Ghayavi language =

Austronesian language spoken in Papua New Guinea

Ghayavi
- Boianaki
- Native to: Papua New Guinea
- Region: Milne Bay Province, tip of Cape Vogel
- Native speakers: (2,800 cited 2000 census)
- Language family: Austronesian: Malayo-Polynesian; Oceanic; Western; Papuan Tip; Kilivila – Nuclear Papuan Tip; Are–Taupota; Are; Ghayavi

Language codes
- ISO 639-3: bmk
- Glottolog: ghay1237

Ghayavi, or Boianaki, is an Austronesian language of the eastern Papua New Guinean mainland.

== Phonology ==
The phonology of Ghayavi is typical of most Oceanic languages in that its phoneme inventory is characterised by a small number of phonemes and few complex articulations. Ghayavi has sixteen consonant phonemes, and thirteen vowel phonemes (including five diphthongs). Stress by default occurs on the penultimate syllable, although there are some examples of contrastive stress to encode semantic difference. One such minimal pair includes /kɑˈwam/ 'your mouth' and /ˈkɑwam/ 'your spouse'.

Ghayavi Consonant Inventory
| | | Bilabial | Alveolar | Palatal | Labiodental | Velar |
|---|---|---|---|---|---|---|
| Plosive | Voiced | b | d | | | g gw |
| | Voiceless | p | t ɾ | | | k kw |
| Fricative | Voiced | v | | | v | ɣ |
| | Voiceless | f | s | | | |
| Nasal | | m | n | | | |
| Approximant | | w | | j | | |

Ghayavi Vowel Inventory
| | Front | Central | Back |
|---|---|---|---|
| Close | i | | u |
| Mid | | e | o |
| Open | a | | |
