= Yamalele language =

Austronesian language spoken in Papua New Guinea

Iamalele
- Native to: Papua New Guinea
- Region: Milne Bay Province (Fergusson Island)
- Native speakers: (2,800 cited 1987)
- Language family: Austronesian: Malayo-Polynesian; Oceanic; Western Oceanic; Papuan Tip; Nuclear Papuan Tip; North Papuan Mainland – D'Entrecasteaux; Bwaidoga; Iamalele

Language codes
- ISO 639-3: yml
- Glottolog: iama1237

Iamalele (Yamalele, Ubuvala) is an Austronesian language spoken on Fergusson Island in Milne Bay Province of Papua New Guinea.
