= Haigwai language =

Austronesian language spoken in Papua New Guinea

Haigwai
- Native to: Papua New Guinea
- Region: Milne Bay Province
- Native speakers: (1,100 cited 2000 census)
- Language family: Austronesian: Malayo-Polynesian; Oceanic; Western Oceanic; Papuan Tip; Nuclear Papuan Tip; North Mainland – D'Entrecasteaux; Taupota; Haigwai
- Dialects: Naura; Kapulika

Language codes
- ISO 639-3: hgw
- Glottolog: haig1237

Haigwai is an Oceanic language of Milne Bay Province, Papua New Guinea.
