= Abadi language =

Austronesian language spoken in Papua New Guinea

Abadi
- Region: Papuan Peninsula, eastern New Guinea
- Native speakers: 2,900 (2011)
- Language family: Austronesian: Malayo-Polynesian; Oceanic; Western Oceanic; Papuan Tip; Central Papuan Tip; West Central; Abadi

Language codes
- ISO 639-3: kbt
- Glottolog: abad1241

The Abadi language (also known as Kabadi and Gabadi) is an Oceanic language of Papua New Guinea. Specifically, it is located in the Central Province, in the Kairuku district populating five main villages. The language has 2,900 native speakers as of 2011. The language is used among all ages, struggling for restoration. Abadi speakers carry a positive attitude towards their language and strive for improvement.

Abadi is an Austronesian language and is classified as [kbt]. The term Abadi stems from the speakers themselves from which they refer to their language. They may use the term Gabadi from the speakers of the surrounding languages.

== Living and traditional practices ==
In the area of the Abadi, it seems to be evolving towards an individualistic rather than a community-minded society. Once a society of hunters and gatherers splitting everything among one another, is transforming into a community of strong family units. Each member of the community belongs to a clan and each clan in each village has a chief. Subsequently, the land is owned by the chief which is then passed down to his sons. If a chief had no sons, the land would be passed down to his daughters. The Abadi live in large houses standing at six to ten feet above the ground. The majority of houses are built with a corrugated-iron roof. Houses have acquired modern technology though some still contain walls produced from bush materials, such as bamboo.

=== Naming ===
The Adabi name their children as soon as they are conceived. The firstborn generally takes up a name from relatives on the father's side. If there is a second child, they will be named after a relative from the mother's side. After this a child may then be presented to the community through baptism, where they are given a Christian name.

=== Marriage ===
Traditionally, when discussing a marriage, a man would be required to be at least over 25 years of age and the woman over 20. The man would inform his parents of the woman he has chosen to marry and his parents would then converse with the woman's parents. If all parties agree, a bride price would take place before the ceremony begins. Bride prices are currently uncommon though the bride may request one.

== Phonology and orthography ==
Consonants

	Labial	Alveolar	Palatal	Velar	Glottal
Plosive	p~pʰ b	t d		k~kʰ g	ʔ
Nasal	m	n			
Tap		ɾ			
Fricative	β~v	s			
Approximant			j		

- [β] and [v] are in free variation.
- [k] and [p] are in free variation with their aspirated counterparts [kʰ] and [pʰ]

Vowels

	Front	Central	Back
Close	i		u
Close-mid	e	(ə)	o
Open-mid	ɛ		
Open		ɑ	

- [ɛ] may be in free variation with [e]
- [ə] is an allophone of [ɑ] when in between two consonants, when it is part of a diphthong, or word-finally.

The Abadi alphabet includes a, b, d, e, g, i, k, m, n, o, p, r, s, t, u, v and '. Consonants included are b, d, g, k, m, n, p, r, s, t, v and '. Vowels included are a, e, i, o, and u.

== Grammar ==
Abadi has subject–object–verb (SOV) word order.
