= Are language =

Oceanic language spoken in Papua New Guinea

Are
- Mukawa
- Native to: Papua New Guinea
- Region: Milne Bay Province, tip of Cape Vogel
- Native speakers: 1,700 (2015)
- Language family: Austronesian: Malayo-Polynesian; Oceanic; Western; Papuan Tip; Kilivila – Nuclear Papuan Tip; Are–Taupota; Are; Are

Language codes
- ISO 639-3: mwc
- Glottolog: aree1239

The Are language is an Austronesian language of the eastern Papua New Guinean mainland.
