= Gapapaiwa language =

Austronesian language spoken in Papua New Guinea

Gapapaiwa
- Native to: Papua New Guinea
- Region: Milne Bay Province, Cape Vogel
- Native speakers: 3,000 (2007)
- Language family: Austronesian: Malayo-Polynesian; Oceanic; Western; Papuan Tip; Kilivila – Nuclear Papuan Tip; Are–Taupota; Are; Gapapaiwa

Language codes
- ISO 639-3: pwg
- Glottolog: gapa1238

Gapapaiwa, also Gapa or Paiwa, is an Austronesian language of the eastern Papua New Guinean mainland.
