= Cape Vogel =

Cape in Milne Bay Province, Papua New Guinea

Coordinates: 9°42′S 150°2′E

Cape Vogel is a cape on the north coast of Milne Bay Province, Papua New Guinea. It lies adjacent to Ward Hunt Strait and forms the northern point of Goodenough Bay. In 1874, Captain John Moresby, commanding HMS Basilisk named the cape after Sir Julius Vogel, the then Premier of New Zealand.
