= Yakaikeke language =

Austronesian language spoken in Papua New Guinea

Yakaikeke
- Native to: Papua New Guinea
- Region: Milne Bay Province
- Native speakers: (100 cited 1998)
- Language family: Austronesian: Malayo-Polynesian; Oceanic; Western Oceanic; Papuan Tip; Nuclear Papuan Tip; North Mainland – D'Entrecasteaux; Taupota; Yakaikeke

Language codes
- ISO 639-3: ykk
- Glottolog: yaka1275
- ELP: Yakaikeke

Yakaikeke (Iakaikeke) is an Oceanic language of Milne Bay Province, Papua New Guinea.
