= Bwanabwana language =

Austronesian language spoken in Papua New Guinea

Bwanabwana
- Tubetube
- Region: Milne Bay Province, Papua New Guinea
- Native speakers: 2,400 (2007)
- Language family: Austronesian: Malayo-Polynesian; Oceanic; Western; Papuan Tip; Nuclear; Suauic; Bwanabwana

Language codes
- ISO 639-3: tte
- Glottolog: bwan1241

Bwanabwana, also known as Tubetube, is an Austronesian language spoken on the small islands just off the eastern tip of Papua New Guinea. It is spoken in Bwanabwana Rural LLG.
