= Nimoa language =

Austronesian language spoken in Papua New Guinea

Nimoa
- Rifao
- Native to: Papua New Guinea
- Region: Nimoa Island
- Native speakers: (1,100 cited 2000 census)
- Language family: Austronesian: Malayo-Polynesian; Oceanic; Western; Papuan Tip; Nimoa–Sudest; Nimoa

Language codes
- ISO 639-3: nmw
- Glottolog: nimo1246

Nimoa, or Rifao, is an Oceanic language of Papua New Guinea, spoken on Nimoa and neighboring islands.
