= Dawawa language =

Austronesian language spoken in Papua New Guinea

Dawawa
- Native to: Papua New Guinea
- Region: Milne Bay Province, tip of Cape Vogel
- Native speakers: (2,000 cited 2000)
- Language family: Austronesian: Malayo-Polynesian; Oceanic; Western Oceanic; Papuan Tip; Nuclear Papuan Tip; North Papuan Mainland – D'Entrecasteaux; Kakabai; Dawawa

Language codes
- ISO 639-3: dww
- Glottolog: dawa1242

Dawawa (Dawana) is an Austronesian language spoken in Milne Bay Province of Papua New Guinea.
