= Buhutu language =

Austronesian language spoken in Papua New Guinea

Buhutu
- Region: Milne Bay Province, Papua New Guinea
- Native speakers: 1,400 (2003)
- Language family: Austronesian: Malayo-Polynesian; Oceanic; Western; Papuan Tip; Nuclear; Suauic; Buhutu

Language codes
- ISO 639-3: bxh
- Glottolog: buhu1237

Buhutu (Bohutu) is an Oceanic language spoken in Milne Bay Province of Papua New Guinea. Most Buhutu speakers live in the Sagarai River Valley between Mullins Harbour on the south coast and the Pima mountains north of the Sagarai.

== Alphabet ==
Buhutu language has 19 letters (Aa, Bb, Dd, Ee, Ff, Gg, Hh, Ii, Kk, Ll, Mm, Nn, Oo, Pp, Ss, Tt, Uu, Ww, Yy), glottal stop and seven diphthongs (bw, fw, gw, hw, kw, mw, pw).
