= Sinaugoro language =

Austronesian language spoken in Papua New Guinea

Sinaugoro
- Native to: Papua New Guinea
- Region: Central Province
- Native speakers: (18,000 cited 2000 census)
- Language family: Austronesian: Malayo-Polynesian; Oceanic; Western Oceanic; Papuan Tip; Central; Sinagoro–Keapara; Sinaugoro

Language codes
- ISO 639-3: snc
- Glottolog: sina1266

Sinaugoro is an Austronesian language of Papua New Guinea. It is mainly spoken in the Rigo District of Central Province by some 15,000 people. The language is closely related to Motu.

== Phonology ==
=== Consonants ===
		Labial	Alveolar	Palatal	Velar	
		Labial	Alveolar	Palatal	plain	lab.
Plosive	voiceless		t		k	kʷ
Plosive	voiced	b	d		ɡ	ɡʷ
Fricative	voiceless	f	s			
Fricative	voiced	v		(ʝ)	ɣ	ɣʷ
Nasal		m	n			
Rhotic			r			
Approximant			l	(j)		

- /i/ is heard as a glide [j] when in word-initial position before a vowel, or within a syllable or syllable-initial onset.
- /ɣ/ is heard as palatal [ʝ] when before front vowels.

=== Vowels ===
	Front	Central	Back
High	i		u
Mid	e		o
Low		a	

- Sounds /e, o/ are heard as [ɛ, ɔ] when in stressed syllables, or when the nucleus of the following syllable is /a/ or /o/.

== Writing system ==
Sinaugoro alphabet
a	b	d	e	f	g	ḡ	ḡw	i	k	kw	l	m	n	o	r	s	t	u	v

== Grammar ==
Sinaugoro is an agglutinative language with ergative alignment and subject–object–verb (SOV) word order. Number is marked explicitly on the verb and freely within the noun phrase, but is not marked on the noun itself. A morphological distinction is made in Sinaugoro between the possession of alienable and inalienable nouns, and then between the alienable possession of edible and inedible objects.

Verbal indexing of person and number in Sinaugoro makes freestanding personal pronouns optional. These are given below, displaying a distinction between inclusive and exclusive.

Personal pronouns in Sinaugoro
		singular	plural
1st person	exclusive	au	gai
1st person	inclusive	au	gita
2nd person		goi	gomi
3rd person		gia	gia
