= Anuki language =

Austronesian language spoken in Papua New Guinea

Anuki
- Native to: Papua New Guinea
- Region: Milne Bay Province, tip of Cape Vogel
- Native speakers: (890 cited 2001)
- Language family: Austronesian: Malayo-Polynesian; Oceanic; Western Oceanic; Papuan Tip; Nuclear Papuan Tip; North Papuan Mainland – D'Entrecasteaux; Anuki

Language codes
- ISO 639-3: aui
- Glottolog: anuk1239
- ELP: Anuki
- Anuki is classified as Definitely Endangered by the UNESCO Atlas of the World's Languages in Danger.

The Anuki language is an Austronesian language spoken by the Gabobora people along Cape Vogel in the Milne Bay Province of Papua New Guinea. The language was named after a highly respected deity of the people, whose sacred remains now rest in Australia.

== Phonology ==
Consonants
	Labial	Alveolar	Velar	Labiovelar	Glottal
Plosive	p b	t d	k g	kʷ ⟨kw⟩ gʷ ⟨gw⟩	ʔ
Fricative	v	s	ɣ ⟨gh⟩		
Nasal	m m̩ː ⟨mm⟩	n	ŋ		
Approximant		r	j ⟨y⟩	w	

- Consonants can be labialized in stressed syllables or before /ɨi/.

Vowels
	Front	Central	Back
High	i	ɨ ^{[a]}	u
Near-High			ʊ ⟨ou⟩
Mid	e		o
Low		a	

^{a} /ɨ/ is only found in the diphthong /ɨi/.

Additionally, the following diphthongs can be found: /ɨi/, /ae/, /ai/, /au/, /ei/, /eo/, /eu/, /iu/, /oe/, /oi/. /ɨi/ is written as ⟨ii⟩.

Stress is always found on the penultimate syllable.
