= Saliba language (Papua New Guinea) =

Language of Papua New Guinea

Saliba
- Native to: Papua New Guinea
- Region: Milne Bay Province
- Native speakers: 2,500 (2007)
- Language family: Austronesian: Malayo-Polynesian; Oceanic; Western; Papuan Tip; Nuclear; Suauic; Saliba

Language codes
- ISO 639-3: sbe
- Glottolog: sali1295
- ELP: Saliba

Saliba is an Oceanic language spoken on the islets off the southeastern tip of Papua New Guinea. There are approximately 2,500 speakers of Saliba. Significant documentation of the language was undertaken by the Saliba-Logea documentation project, and hundreds of audio-video resources can be found in the project archive.

== Culture ==
The most common occupation for the Saliba people is fishing. The four major villages are Sidudu, Sawasawaga, Logeakai and Logeapwata.

=== Endangerment ===
The Saliba language is currently endangered. Currently there are only elders that speak it and a few young children who have learned in the early years of their life. Most of the people speak English because it is seen as the more prestigious language. This only further makes Saliba the minority language in the land.

=== Dialects ===
There are two dialects, Saliba and Logea, the first spoken on Saliba island and the second spoken on Logea island. Differences between the dialects are considered mainly lexical in nature.

== Phonology ==
=== Consonants ===
Consonant inventory
	Bilabial	Labialized	Alveolar	Velar	Labialized velar	Glottal
Plosive	p, b	pʷ, bʷ	t, d	k, g	kʷ, gʷ	ʔ
Nasal	m	mʷ	n	(ŋ)		
Fricative			s			h, (ɦ)
Approximant			l	(j)		(w)

There is a voicing distinction between the oral plosives that is primarily cued by voice onset time (VOT). Voiceless plosives have a larger VOT. As with other Austronesian languages, word-initial voiced stops are often pre-nasalized. In casual speech, both types of plosives are subject to lenition between two vowels. For instance, 'old man' may be pronounced as /taubada/ in careful speech but [tauβ̞aða] in colloquial speech.

The voiceless alveolar stop /t/ is either pronounced at the alveolar [t] or dental place [t̪]. Such an alternation does not exist for its voiced counterpart /d/.

The labialized consonants only appear before the vowel /a/. The only exceptions to this rule are the words [kʷekʷe] 'green tree frog', [mʷedamʷeda] 'sturgeon fish', and [bʷenabʷenam] 'tree type'.

The velar nasal only appears in English loan words such as [aŋka] 'anchor'.

The glottal fricative can be voiced between two vowels: [loɦe] 'to look'.

The lateral approximant has multiple intervocalic allophones: [ɺ], [ɾ], or [ɹ]. For instance, take polohe 'heavy', pronounced as [polohe] or [poɾohe].

=== Vowels ===
Vowel inventory
	Front	Central	Back
High	i		u
Mid	e		o
Low		a	

The status of /w/ and /j/ as phonemes, instead of as allophones, are debatable. According to Mosel (1994), they are in complementary distribution with the vowels /u/ and /i/ respectively. Other sources treat them as separate phonemes.

=== Orthography ===
In its orthography, Saliba uses Latin alphabets. The letters can also be upper case or lower case. All of Saliba's orthography is in the table below.

Phoneme	Orthography
i	i
e	e
a	a
o	o
u	u
p	p
p^{w}	pw
b	b
b^{w}	bw
t	t
d	d
k	k
k^{w}	kw
g	g
g^{w}	gw
ʔ	'
s	s
h	h
l	l
w	w
j	y

=== Syllables ===
The syllables in Saliba have three possible structures: V, CV, or CVM (with the last being a heavy syllable). Among native vocabulary, the only allowable coda consonant is /m/. Onset consonant clusters appear only in loan words, such as sto.li from English 'story'. In fact, intrusive vowels may be inserted to eliminate consonant clusters altogether (e.g., [sitoli]).

In Saliba, all nouns, verbs, adjectives, and some adverbs are composed of at least two light syllables or one heavy syllable. On the other hand, words used mostly for grammatical functions, such as conjunctions, pronouns, particles, etc. can be made up of only a CV or just a V.

=== Stress ===
Stress in Saliba, although described, is not considered very important to its phonology. There is occasionally a slight stress on the penultimate syllable. For example, in the word la.'pu.i, meaning 'hear', the syllable in the middle would be slightly stressed. In disyllabic words, the initial syllable is stressed when the final syllable is light (CV or V). If the final syllable is heavy, then it is stressed. In longer words, stress is harder to identify.

The primary cue for stress is vowel duration and intensity, with stressed syllables being longer and louder.

== Grammar ==
=== Verbs ===
All verbs in Saliba can be classified as either transitive or intransitive verbs on formal grounds. To convert from transitive to intransitive verbs the suffix -i or a suffix that looks like -(C)ei is used, C being any consonant depending on the verb. The suffix -i can also be used to turn some nouns into transitive verbs. For example, nigwa, 'knife', becomes nigwa-i, 'cut with a knife'. Another important formational affix for verbs is the causative prefix he-, e.g. kita, 'see' becomes he-kita, 'show', or, 'cause to see'. Something special about the verbs in Saliba is that the stems of two lexical verbs can combine to form one inflected verb. For example, in the verb phrase ye-kamposi-dobi, which means 'he jumped down', the verb kamposi-dobi is made up of kamposi ('jump') and dobi ('go down'). The two stems have combined to form one complex verb.

==== Tense and aspect ====
Tense is not marked in Saliba verb phrases, but aspect is. When absolute time reference is needed, Saliba uses time words like lahi, 'yesterday', malaitom, 'tomorrow', or oblique phrases like malatomtom-yena, 'in the morning'.

==== Reduplication ====
Saliba uses reduplication for a few things. One function of reduplication is to convert certain action verbs into noun. For example, the word kuya means 'to sweep'. If kuya is reduplicated to kuyakuya it becomes 'broom'. Another example could be lau meaning 'go'. If that word is reduplicated to laulau it now means 'method' or 'way'. Another reason a verb would be reduplicated is the verb is being used as an attributive verb. An example of this would be in the sentence kai namwa-namwa-di. That sentence means 'good food'. Notice namwa, meaning 'good', is reduplicated since it is a verb that is being used like an adjective. The last reason a verb would get reduplicated is in the imperfective aspect of an action verb. The reduplication is used to mark this occurrence in the sentence. Imperfective aspect is used to show habitual or progressive events. For example, in the sentence ...nige koya-i se pai-paisoa which means '(they) did not work in the garden'. The pai ('work') is reduplicated to mark that this is probably a habitual behavior.

=== Adjectives ===
As far as adjectives go, in Saliba there appears to be no difference between verbs and adjectives. The only rule is, with the exception of some verbs, all verbs are duplicated when they are going to be used as adjectives.

=== Nouns ===
Nouns in Saliba have four kinds of affixes that can be attached to them. The first one is a suffix that is used for possession. The next one is the plural suffix which is (-o, -ao, -uwo, or -wao) on nouns that refer to humans. Another affix is the locative suffix (-i). The last affix is called a determiner.

==== Noun phrases ====
Noun phrases are everything in a sentence that is not the verb. Noun phrases can be subjects, objects, predicates and parts of prepositional and post-positional phrases. In its simplest form, a noun phrase can be made out of just a noun and a determiner. For example, mwaedo, which in Saliba means 'eel', is a simple noun phrase. A noun phrase is typically broken up into two parts, the nucleus and possibly multiple modifiers. Modifiers can include things like possessors and demonstratives (words that give location), which would go before the head noun. The other types of modifiers, such as verbal modifiers and quantifiers, would go after the head noun.

One of the most important modifiers is the determiner. This modifier is usually attached to the last part of the noun phrase and gives a reference to the head noun in the noun phrase with regard to the rest of the sentence. However, noun phrases used as prepositional phrases do not have determiners.

Quantifiers such as cardinal numerals can go either before or after the adjective in a sentence. Ordinal numerals on the other hand, such as first, second, etc. behave like adjectives and go after the noun in Saliba.

=== Pronouns ===
Person/Clusivity	independent	subject	object	possessive
First person, singular	yau	ya	-gau	-gu
Second person, singular	kowa	ko, ku, 'o, 'u	-go	-m
Third person, singular	iya	ye/i		-na
First person inclusive	kita	ta	-da	-da
First person, exclusive	kai	ka	-gai	-ma/mai
Second person, plural	komiu	kwa	-gomiu	-mi
Third person, plural	sia	se/si	-di	-di

The table holds all the different pronouns in Saliba. There are different rules for using each of them though. Starting with independent pronouns, when using these pronouns in a sentence they can and will most likely form noun phrases and will have a determiner. An example of a sentence using an independent pronoun could go as follows: Kai-wa ka matausi, which means 'We were scared'. In the next column are subject pronouns, these pronouns are used as the subject in a sentence hence their name. To be more precise one could say they are the subject of verbal clauses. According to linguists who have studied Saliba, object pronouns are only put on certain objects. One example using both types of pronouns could be Wawaya-o-wa kwa hanoi-di, which means 'Wake up the children'. Note the kwa particle marking the subject and the -di particle marking possession. Another example could be Sina-gu yo tama-gu se hanoi-gai, meaning 'My mother and my father woke us up'. Again the two possessive pronouns -gu to mark 'my father and my mother' and also the se and -gai used to mark the subject and object respectively. Additionally, the subject pronouns ku and u are only used mostly for imperatives or events where the verb expressing it is not realized: for example, ku lau which means 'go!'. In the last column, possessions, the rules for using the suffixes in a sentence are split up into alienable possessions and inalienable possessions. For alienable possessions, the possessive pronoun goes after one of the two possessive classifiers as shown in the table below.

yo-	English	ka-	English
yogu numa	my house	kagu puaka	my pig
yom numa	your house	kam puaka	your pig
yona numa	his/her house	kana puaka	his/her pig
yoda numa	our house (inclusive)	kada puaka	our pig (inclusive)
yoma numa	our house (exclusive)	kama puaka	our pig (exclusive)
yomi numa	your house	kami puaka	your pig
yodi numa	their house	kadi puaka	their pig

For inalienable possessions the possessive classifiers yo- and ka- are not used. Instead, the possessive pronoun suffix goes after the possessed noun. If the inalienable noun is plural then the plural suffix will just go directly after the possessive suffix, as shown in the table below.

Singular	English	Plural	English
natu-ga	my child	natu-gu-wao	my children
natu-m	your child	natu-m-wao	your children
natu-na	his/her child	natu-na-o	his/her children
natu-da-o	our child (inclusive)	natu-da-o	our children (inclusive)
natu-mai	our child (exclusive)	natu-mai-ao	our children (exclusive)
natu-mi	your child	natu-mi-ao	your children
natu-di	their child	natu-di-ao	their children

==== Demonstratives ====
A demonstrative is a type of pronoun that points out a noun. In Saliba demonstratives, with the exception of meta, go before the head noun. Meta is the only one that goes after a head noun and its determiner. Saliba's demonstrative pronouns are as follows:

Demonstrative	English
teina	this (very close to speaker)
tenem	that (close to the person being spoken to)
temeta, meta	that
wau	this (as in 'this day')

==== Interrogative and indefinite pronouns ====
In Saliba most of the interrogative pronouns also function as indefinite pronouns. Interrogative pronouns are pronouns used when asking a question. Indefinite pronouns are pronouns used to mention any sort of general person, place, or thing. The interrogative/indefinite pronouns for Saliba are listed below.

Interrogative	English
haedi	where, anywhere
hisa	how many, some
kaiteya	who, somebody, anybody
kaiuyana	when
saha	what, something, anything
sahasaha	which one
idohagi	how
ye saha to	why

All of the pronouns in this list except the last two are nouns. The last two happen to be verbs. An example of using one of these in a sentence would be haedi kwa lau? meaning 'where did you go?'.

=== Possession ===
As mentioned previously, Saliba has different rules for possessions depending on if they are alienable possessions or inalienable possessions. If a possession is inalienable, then the possessed noun is written with the correct possessive suffix directly following it, such as sina-gu, meaning 'my mother'. -gu would be the possessive suffix. However, if it is an alienable possession then the possessive suffix directly follows one of the two possessive classifiers, yo- or ka-, such as in yo-gu numa, 'my house', or ka-gu kai, 'my food'. In a sentence the person who possesses the possessed noun is treated as the subject and possessed noun is then the head of the predicate. They are written in such a way that there is nothing separating the subject from the head of the predicate. To negate the predicate, such as saying someone does not have something, the negation particle nige would be added before the predicate phrase like so: Yau nige natu-gu, meaning 'I don't have a child'. The following table lists things the people of Saliba find inalienable, alienable ka- constructions, and alienable yo- constructions.

Inalienable	Alienable (ka-)	Alienable (yo-)
body parts	food that is going to be eaten	something that is owned
parts of a thing	clothes	agent of intransitive and transitive actions
spatial relation	illnesses	kinship
container and content	involuntary events and those affected by them	
quantity and quantified items	kinship	
transitive actions and their patients		
kinship		

Depending on the context, almost any noun can appear as alienable or inalienable. For example, one could say pou-na, meaning 'her egg' (hen's egg), ka-na pou, meaning 'his/her egg' (egg that he/she is going to eat), or yo-na pou, meaning 'his/her egg' (egg that he/she owns).

The category of body parts refers to things like hands, feet, etc. Parts of inanimate objects includes things such as the root of a coconut or the core of an apple. Spatial relation refers to space, such as the inside of a house. Container and content can mean things like a cup of water or a bowl of food. Quantity and quantified items are not referring to objects, but are rather more figurative, referring to age and time.

In terms of semantics, linguists can see three different types of relationships based on these constructions. Those relationships are relationships where the possessor and the possessee can part, relationships in which the possessor and the possessee cannot part but the possessor has complete control over the possessee, and a relationship in which the possessor and the possessee cannot part but the possessee has an effect on the possessor. An example of the last relationship would be a body part. Kinship is an outlier and appears in all three categories. Linguists do not know why this is. They can only assume that it is because of historical reasons. Some examples of inalienable kinships and alienable kinships are listed in the following table.

Inalienable	English	Alienable	English
sina-na, tama-na	his/her mother, father	ka-gu bogao	my family
lou-gu	my sibling (of opposite sex)	ka-gu kaha	my sibling (of same sex)
tubu-gu	my grandparent, grandchild	yo-gu saeya	my sibling (of same sex)
iha-di	their brother-in-law	ka-gu tubu bagu-na	my ancestors
		ka-gu tubu mulita	my descendants
		yogu badalendia	my uncle
		yogu golowa	my nephew/niece

== Numeral ==
Saliba	English
kesega	1
labui	2
haeyona	3
hasi	4
haligigi	5
haligi kesega	6
haligi labui	7
haligi haeyona	8
haligi hasi	9
saudoudoi	10
saudoudoi kesega	11
tau kesega ye mwaloi	20
tamoai labui se mwaloi	40
bagubaguna	first
he-labui	second
he-haeyona	third
etc.	

== Basic sentence structure ==
Saliba is a subject-object-verb (SOV) language. Saliba follows the nominative-accusative pattern in its sentences. The basic clause in Saliba is composed of a verb with its subject and object with its affixes. Any noun phrases preceding or succeeding this core can be thought of as an expansion of this clause. A simple sentence could be Kai-wa ka matausi palapa, which means 'We were really frightened'. Saliba also has nonverbal clauses such as nominal clauses, existential clauses, possessive clauses and clauses with other special predicates.

An example of a nominal clause would be Kita taulauhekata, which means 'we are teachers'. The next nonverbal clause is the existential clause. These types of clauses will have the word temenai ('there') or a post-positional phrase to refer to a location. An example of this would be in the sentence Temenai sikuli labui, which means 'There are two schools'. Another nonverbal clause would be the possessive clause, which is a noun phrase that refers to a possessor and a possessee.

=== Conjunctions ===
The following table lists all the conjunctions in Saliba and their usage.

Conjunctions	English
yo	and (when connecting nouns and noun phrases)
na	and (when connecting clauses)
huyana	when
matawuwuna	because
usina	while
ena	if

=== Determiners ===
In Saliba, determiners are always the last part of a noun phrase. Most nouns will have a determiner after them. If a noun phrase is a predicate, then it will not have a determiner.

== Particles ==
Saliba uses many different particles to mark certain things in sentences. These particles usually go before the verb phrase but there are a couple that can go after the verb phrase.

=== Kabo ===
The particle Kabo is used to mark that something new is happening. This could mean a change in the situation, a change in the weather etc. An example sentence would be Ka keno-keno na kabo nabu ye talu. This sentence means 'When we were sleeping, it started to rain'. Notice kabo is used because something changed, in this case the weather. Another instance in which kabo can be used is to indicate an event that will happen in the future. For example, if someone said, "Saha kabo ta ginauli", (meaning 'What are we going to do?'), kabo is used to imply a change to the current situation. In these examples, kabo was used to mark a change but kabo can also be used for comparison, such as Maui saliya-na ye loha na kabo Tahali, which translates to 'Maui is taller than Tahali'. In all of these sentences the particle is actually placed in many different places in the sentence. For example, in the first sentence the particle was placed before the object, while in the second sentence it was placed before the subject. The placement of this particle varies and there do not appear to be any specific rules as to where to exactly put kabo in a sentence. All that is known is that it can sometimes go at the very beginning of a sentence before everything else, just before the subject, or after the subject but before the predicate.

=== Bena ===
This particle is used to mark something that should happen or something that someone should do. The closest English word to this particle would be the word must; however, it is not as strong as must. For example, in the sentence Bena teinamona ku lau maketi, which means 'You must go to the market', the particle can be directly translated as 'must'. However, in the following sentence Ya henua bena pasta yo-na pwaole ya kaiwahali, meaning 'I want to steal the pastor's rooster', the use of bena here is not as strong as something that has to be done, and is closer to 'want' in this case.

=== Tabu ===
Tabu is a negation particle. This particle is used when the speaker wants to express something that should not happen or should not be done. For example, in the sentence Tabu ku mode the speaker is saying 'don't worry'. Another example with tabu is the sentence tabu bena kaitea i kita-gau, which means 'Don't let anybody see me'. Note that in the previous sentence, since the subject is third person, the particle tabu must be used with the particle bena like shown.

=== Taba ===
Taba is another negation particle. This particle is used to express something that a person does not want to do. Unlike tabu though, taba can only be used in conjunction with nige, meaning 'not'. An example sentence could be Taba nige ya hedede, which means 'I don't want to tell'.

=== Besina ===
Besina is a particle that is used to express something that has to be done no matter what. This particle is definitely stronger than bena and is probably more closely related to the word must in English. A way this particle could be used in a sentence is Ye wowolina besina se lau mo, which means 'It was stormy but nevertheless they had to go'.

=== Gonoana ===
Linguists cannot classify this particle. They have best described it as an inalienably possessed noun. This particle is used for something that someone is able to do. A simple example would be Gonoa-na u kalina Saliba?, meaning 'Can you speak Saliba?'.

=== Nuana ===
The particle nuana is used when the speaker is presuming something to be true. For example, the sentence Lahi nuana sina-gu ye lau maketi, which means 'Perhaps my mother went to the market yesterday'. As seen in this sentence, nuana is used to express the fact that the speaker does not know for sure if his mother went to the market – it is a guess or assumption.

=== Yako/ko ===
These two particles, unlike the ones previously, go after the verb phrase instead of before the verb phrase. Both of these particles are used to express something that has already been done previously before the time at which the speaker is talking about it. The only difference between yako and ko is that yako is used for transitive verb phrases and ko is used for intransitive verb phrases. An example sentence using yako would be Hewali-wa meta hasala-wa i tawasolao yako, which means 'That young man had already married the girl'. An example sentence using ko would be Yo-gu numa ye kalasi ko, meaning 'My house burnt down'. As shown in both sentences, since these particles go after the verb phrase they are the last things in the sentence.

=== Kesegai ===
This particle, like yako and ko goes after the verb phrase in the sentence. Clearly this particle is derived from the word kesega meaning 'one'. Kesegai is used to mark things that happen continuously and without interruption – for example, Nabu ye talu kesegai, which means 'It kept on raining'.
