= Waima language =

Austronesian language spoken in Papua New Guinea

Waima
- Region: Eastern New Guinea
- Native speakers: (15,000 cited 2000 census)
- Language family: Austronesian: Malayo-Polynesian; Oceanic; Western Oceanic; Papuan Tip; Central Papuan Tip; West Central; Nuclear West Central; Waima

Language codes
- ISO 639-3: rro
- Glottolog: waim1251

The Waima language (sometimes known as Roro, though this is strictly the name of one dialect of Waima) is a Nuclear West Central Papuan Tip language of the Oceanic group of Malayo-Polynesian languages, spoken in Papua New Guinea by 15,000 people. The three dialects, Waima, Roro, and Paitana, are very close.

== Phonology ==
=== Consonants ===
	Labial	Alveolar	Velar	Glottal
Nasal	m	n		
Plosive	p	t tʲ	k	ʔ
Fricative	β			h
Rhotic		ɾ		
Approximant	w			

/n/ can be palatalized as [ɲ] when before vowel sequences /ao, au/.

=== Vowels ===
	Front	Central	Back
High	i		u
Mid	e		o
Low		a	
