= Kakabai language =

Austronesian language spoken in Papua New Guinea

Kakabai
- Igora
- Native to: Papua New Guinea
- Region: Milne Bay Province, tip of Cape Vogel
- Native speakers: 900 (2003)
- Language family: Austronesian: Malayo-Polynesian; Oceanic; Western Oceanic; Papuan Tip; Nuclear Papuan Tip; North Papuan Mainland – D'Entrecasteaux; Kakabai–Dawawa; Kakabai

Language codes
- ISO 639-3: kqf
- Glottolog: kaka1267

Kakabai is an Austronesian language spoken in Milne Bay Province of Papua New Guinea.

== Phonology ==
Consonants
		Labial		Alveolar	Velar	
		plain	labial	Alveolar	plain	labial
Plosive	Voiceless	p	pʷ ⟨pw⟩	t	k	kʷ ⟨kw⟩
Plosive	Voiced	b	bʷ ⟨bw⟩	d	g	gʷ ⟨gw⟩
Fricative		f v		s	ɣ ⟨ḡ⟩	
Nasal		m	mʷ ⟨mw⟩	n		
Approximant				l	j ⟨y⟩	w

- The labialized consonants /pʷ bʷ mʷ kʷ gʷ/ only appear before /a/.
- /l/ varies dialectally between [ɺ~ɾ~l].
- /ɣ/ is realized as [ʝ~h] before front vowels.
- /m/ can appear syllabically.

Vowels
	Front	Central	Back
High	i		u
Mid	e		o
Low		a	

Stress is usually found on the penultimate syllable.
