= Maiwala language =

Austronesian language spoken in Papua New Guinea

Maiwala
- Native to: Papua New Guinea
- Region: Milne Bay Province
- Native speakers: (2,400 cited 2000 census)
- Language family: Austronesian: Malayo-Polynesian; Oceanic; Western Oceanic; Papuan Tip; Nuclear Papuan Tip; North Mainland – D'Entrecasteaux; Taupota; Maiwala

Language codes
- ISO 639-3: mum
- Glottolog: maiw1249

Maiwala is an Oceanic language of Milne Bay Province, Papua New Guinea.

The Maiwala language has 13 consonants: b, d, ɡ, ɣ ⟨gh⟩, h, k, ɺ ⟨l⟩, m, n, p, s, t, v; two semi-vowels: w, j ⟨y⟩; and five vowels: a, ɛ ⟨e⟩, ɪ ⟨i⟩, ɔ ⟨o⟩, ʊ ⟨u⟩.
