= Taupota language =

Austronesian language spoken in Papua New Guinea

Taupota
- Native to: Papua New Guinea
- Region: Milne Bay Province
- Native speakers: (4,500 cited 2000–2001)
- Language family: Austronesian: Malayo-Polynesian; Oceanic; Western Oceanic; Papuan Tip; Nuclear Papuan Tip; North Mainland – D'Entrecasteaux; Taupota languages; Taupota

Language codes
- ISO 639-3: Variously: tpa – Taupota wag – Wa'ema wed – Wedau
- Glottolog: taup1242 Taupota waem1237 Wa'ema weda1241 Wedau

Taupota is an Oceanic language of the Milne Bay Province, Papua New Guinea. It appears to be a dialect chain, with southern varieties called Wa'ema and western Wedau.

The Wedau variety, which varies between villages, was adopted by Anglican missionaries who settled in Dogura and so became the lingua franca for the southern coast of Goodenough Bay.

== Further information ==
- Copland King (1901). Grammar & Dictionary of the Wedau Language (British New Guinea). W. A. Pepperday & Co.
