= Bwaidoka language =

Austronesian language spoken in Papua New Guinea

Bwaidoka
- Native to: Papua New Guinea
- Region: Milne Bay Province (Goodenough Island, Fergusson Island)
- Native speakers: (6,500 cited 2000)
- Language family: Austronesian: Malayo-Polynesian; Oceanic; Western Oceanic; Papuan Tip; Nuclear Papuan Tip; North Papuan Mainland – D'Entrecasteaux; Bwaidoga; Bwaidoka

Language codes
- ISO 639-3: bwd
- Glottolog: bwai1242

Bwaidoka is an Austronesian language spoken in Milne Bay Province of Papua New Guinea. It is a local lingua franca.

== Phonology ==
=== Consonants ===
		Labial		Dental/ Alveolar	Palatal	Velar	
		plain	lab.	Dental/ Alveolar	Palatal	plain	lab.
Plosive	voiceless			t		k	kʷ
Plosive	voiced	b	bʷ			ɡ	
Fricative	voiceless	f	fʷ	s			
Fricative	voiced	v					
Nasal		m	mʷ	n			
Lateral				l			
Approximant					j	w	

- /t/ can be pronounced as alveolar [t], or dental [t̪] when preceding central or back vowels.
- /ɡ/ can be pronounced as a voiced plosive [ɡ], or as a fricative [ɣ] on an unstressed syllable.
- /j/ can be pronounced as either [j] or as [ð] in free variation.

=== Vowels ===
	Front	Central	Back
Close	i		u
Mid	e		o
Open		a	

- Vowel sounds /i, o, u/ do not occur following labialized consonants.
- /e/ may fluctuate freely from [e] to [ə] in syllable-final, and with [ɛ] as the first vowel sound on stressed syllables.
- /a/ may fluctuate freely from [a] to [ə] on unstressed syllables and as the second vowel sound on stressed syllables.
- /o/ may fluctuate freely from [o] to [ɔ] on unstressed syllables and as the second vowel sound on stressed syllables.
