= Gweda language =

Austronesian language spoken in Papua New Guinea

Gweda
- Garuwahi
- Native to: Papua New Guinea
- Region: Milne Bay Province, tip of Cape Vogel
- Native speakers: (26 cited 2001)
- Language family: Austronesian: Malayo-Polynesian; Oceanic; Western; Papuan Tip; Kilivila – Nuclear Papuan Tip; Are–Taupota; Taupota; Gweda

Language codes
- ISO 639-3: grw
- Glottolog: gwed1239
- ELP: Gweda
- Garuwahi is classified as Definitely Endangered by the UNESCO Atlas of the World's Languages in Danger.

Gweda, or Garuwahi, is an Austronesian language of the eastern Papua New Guinean mainland. As of 2001, it was spoken by three generations of a single family.
