= Budibud language =

Austronesian language spoken in Papua New Guinea

Budibud
- Native to: Papua New Guinea
- Region: Milne Bay Province
- Native speakers: (310 cited 2000)
- Language family: Austronesian: Malayo-Polynesian; Oceanic; Western Oceanic; Papuan Tip; Peripheral; Kilivila; Budibud

Language codes
- ISO 639-3: btp
- Glottolog: budi1249
- ELP: Budibud
- Budibud is classified as Vulnerable by the UNESCO Atlas of the World's Languages in Danger.

Budibud is one of the Kilivila languages (of the Austronesian language family), spoken on the tiny Lachlan Islands, east of Woodlark Island in Papua New Guinea.
