= Doga language =

Austronesian language spoken in Papua New Guinea

Doga
- Native to: Papua New Guinea
- Region: Milne Bay Province, tip of Cape Vogel
- Native speakers: (200 cited 2000)
- Language family: Austronesian: Malayo-Polynesian; Oceanic; Western Oceanic; Papuan Tip; Are–Taupota; Are; Doga

Language codes
- ISO 639-3: dgg
- Glottolog: doga1238
- ELP: Doga
- Doga is classified as Definitely Endangered by the UNESCO Atlas of the World's Languages in Danger.

The Doga language is an Austronesian language spoken by about 200 people along Cape Vogel in the Milne Bay Province of Papua New Guinea.

== Vocabulary ==
poro 'pig'

dara-daragi- 'blood'

babine 'woman'

ubi 'long yam'

bata 'four'

biamo 'how many'

asu 'smoke'

iai 'who?'

-ta 'we (incl.)'

-si 'they'

ae- 'leg'

yamogiri 'mosquito'

tamo-na 'one'
