= Duau Rural LLG =

Local-level government in Papua New Guinea

- Country: Papua New Guinea
- Province: Milne Bay Province
- Time zone: UTC+10 (AEST)

Duau Rural LLG is a local-level government (LLG) of Milne Bay Province, Papua New Guinea. The Duau language is spoken in the LLG.

== Wards ==
- 01. Kelologea
- 02. Sawatupwa
- 03. Mwatebu
- 04. Sawataetae
- 05. Lomitawa
- 06. Sipupu
- 07. Weyoko
- 08. Meudana
- 09. Kwanaura
- 10. Loboda
- 11. Siausi
- 12. Dawada
- 13. Sigasiga
- 14. Sapisapia
- 15. Bihawa
- 16. Somwadina
- 17. Mwalukwasia
- 18. Kasikasi
- 19. Kumwalau
- 20. Kalotau
- 21. Barabara
- 22. Bunama
- 23. Gumali
- 24. Isumayaumayau
- 25. Pwanapwana
- 26. Sibonai
- 27. Bwasiyaiyai
- 28. Kurada
