= Goodenough Island Rural LLG =

Local-level government in Papua New Guinea

- Country: Papua New Guinea
- Province: Milne Bay Province
- Time zone: UTC+10 (AEST)

Goodenough Island Rural LLG is a local-level government (LLG) of Milne Bay Province, Papua New Guinea.

== Wards ==
- 01. Waibula
- 02. Ufaufa
- 03. Watuluma Upper
- 04. Watuluma Lower
- 05. Idakamenai
- 06. Ulutuya
- 07. Wakonai
- 08. Vivigani
- 09. Eweli
- 10. Kalauna
- 11. Belebele
- 12. Mataita West
- 13. Mataita East
- 14. Faiava
- 15. Ufu'ufu
- 16. Bwadoga East
- 17. Bwadoga West
- 18. Wagifa
- 19. Abolu
- 20. Kilia
- 21. Lauwela
- 22. Awale
- 23. Utalo
- 24. Diodio
- 25. Yauyaula
- 26. Awaya
- 27. Ibawana
- 28. Kalimtabutabu
