= Toura language (Papua New Guinea) =

Austronesian language spoken in Papua New Guinea

Toura
- Region: Eastern New Guinea
- Native speakers: 1,800 (2007)
- Language family: Austronesian: Malayo-Polynesian; Oceanic; Western Oceanic; Papuan Tip; Central Papuan Tip; West Central; Nuclear West Central; Toura

Language codes
- ISO 639-3: don
- Glottolog: tour1243

Toura (Doura) is a Malayo-Polynesian language of the central southern coast of the Papuan Peninsula in Papua New Guinea.
