= Magori language =

Austronesian language spoken in Papua New Guinea

Magori
- Native to: Papua New Guinea
- Region: Central Province
- Native speakers: (100 cited 2000)
- Language family: Austronesian: Malayo-Polynesian; Oceanic; Western Oceanic; Papuan Tip; Central; Oumic; Magoric; Magori

Language codes
- ISO 639-3: zgr
- Glottolog: mago1248
- ELP: Magori
- Magori is classified as Vulnerable by the UNESCO Atlas of the World's Languages in Danger.

Magori is a nearly extinct Austronesian language of Papua New Guinea that has been strongly restructured through contact with neighboring Papuan languages, perhaps Mailu, which the Magori people speak fluently today. The restructuring was so extensive that Magori's family was long in doubt; it was finally established by Dutton in 1976. Mailu (also called Magi) in turn borrowed large numbers of Austronesian words, either from Magori or its extinct Oumic relatives.

== See also ==
- Maisin language, a similar case
