= D'Entrecasteaux Islands =

Island group near New Guinea

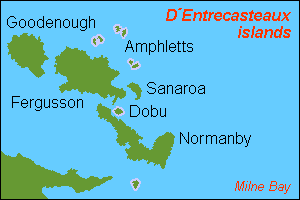
- D'Entrecasteaux Islands.

- Location within Papua New Guinea

Geography
- Location: Oceania
- Coordinates: 9°39′S 150°42′E

Administration
- Papua New Guinea
- Province: Milne Bay Province

D'Entrecasteaux Islands /ˌdɒntrəˈkæstoʊ/ (French: [dɑ̃tʁəkasto]) are situated near the eastern tip of New Guinea in the Solomon Sea in Milne Bay Province of Papua New Guinea. The group spans a distance of 160 km (99 mi), has a total land area of approximately 3,100 km^{2} (1,197 sq mi) and is separated from the Papua New Guinea mainland by the 30 km (19 mi) wide Ward Hunt Strait in the north and the 18 km (11 mi) wide Goschen Strait in the south. D'Entrecasteaux Islands show signs of volcanism.

== Description ==
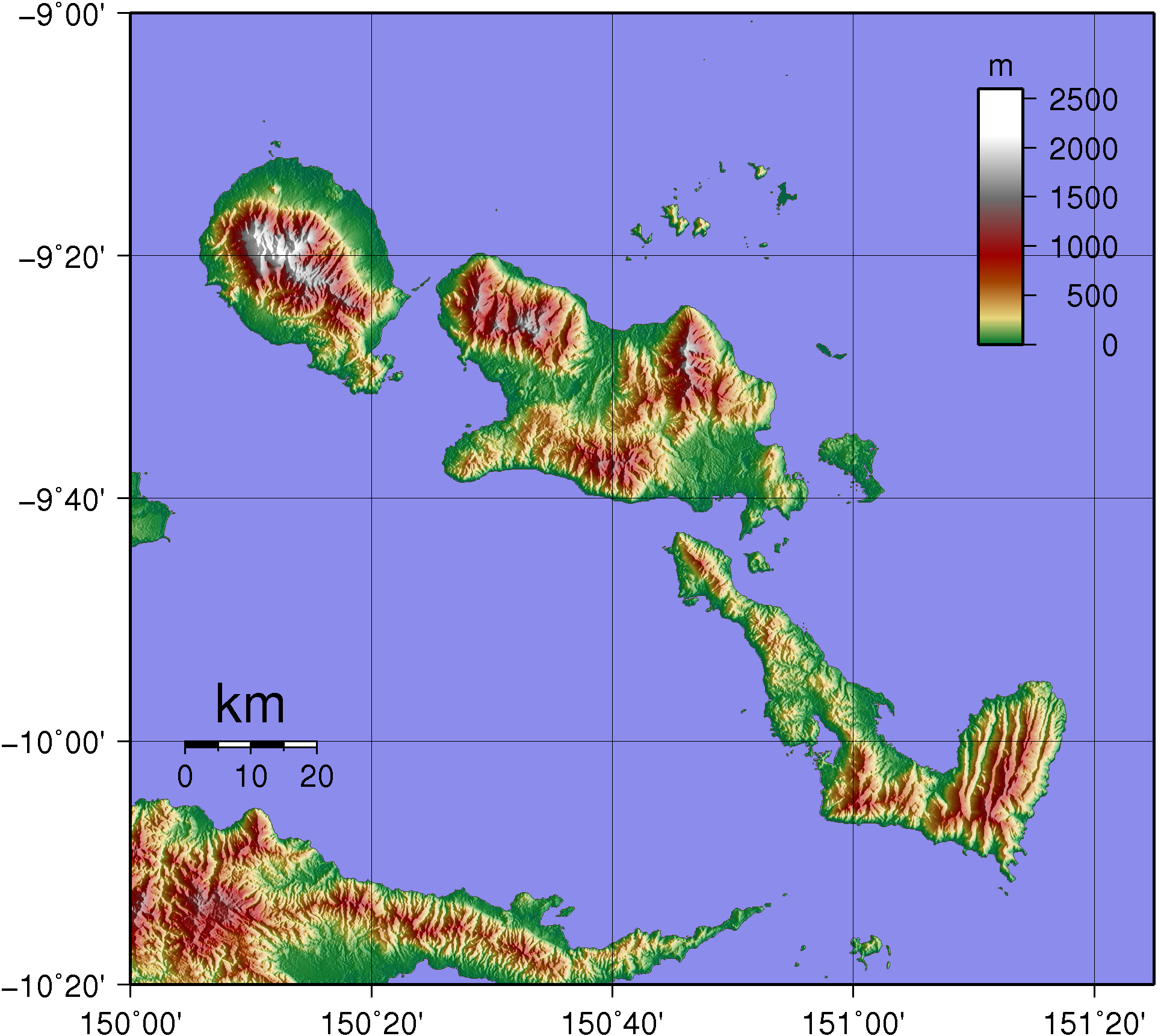
Topographic map of D'Entrecasteaux Islands. Large islands from Northwest to Southeast: Goodenough, Fergusson and Normanby.

The three principal islands, from northwest to southeast, are Goodenough (Nidula), then across Moresby Strait to Fergusson (Moratau), the largest of the three, and across Dawson Strait to Normanby Island (Duau).

In addition there are numerous small islands and reefs. Sanaroa and Dobu are the most significant of the smaller islands, while Sori or Wild is named for HMS Challenger's artist, John James Wild. The highest peak in the group is the 2,536 metres (8,320 ft) Mount Vineuo on Goodenough Island.

The D'Entrecasteaux Islands are volcanically active, with a number of areas of historic/geologic volcanism and active geothermal fields. Fergusson Island has three volcanic masses over 1,828 m (5,997 ft) high. There are geothermal areas in the south east area of Goodenough Island and the Bwabwadana and Iamalele on Fergusson Island. A particularly active hot springs is located at Deidei on Fergusson.

Between Fergusson and Normanby Islands the Dawson Straits Group has several volcanic centres that may define a partly submerged caldera; one of the cones on southwestern Fergusson Island may have erupted in 1350.

== Geology ==
Geologically the islands are largely made up of rock that probably once belonged to the northern edge of the Australian plate that was thrust deep into the Earth's crust by plate collision.

The burial of these rocks to great depths (where they also encountered correspondingly high temperatures) metamorphosed the rocks to eclogite facies: >2GPa and >700˚C. Specifically, these islands play host to the youngest known coesite-eclogite sample; CA-TIMS dating of zircons within this sample dates its formation to ~5Ma, meaning it has been exhumed from a depth of ~100 km at the remarkable rate of ~20mm/yr.

The rock at the centre of the tall domes in these islands was thus recently very deep in the Earth. Over a very short time, geologically speaking, these packets of rocks have ascended through the Earth's shallow mantle and pushed through the crust to form the gneiss domes we find today – the vestiges of the crust these massifs have thrust through are still draped as carapaces over the edges of the domes.

These islands are thought to be geophysically significant because they lie immediately ahead of the westernmost rift tip of the Woodlark spreading centre, which has been propagating westwards into the continent. The D'Entrecasteaux thus represent a stage of continental breakup just preceding fully-fledged volcanic spreading.

== History ==
The group was named for the French navigator Antoine Raymond Joseph de Bruni d'Entrecasteaux, who, in his ship the Espérance, passed through the area in 1792 while searching for his missing compatriot, Jean-François de Galaup, comte de La Pérouse. Almost a century later, in 1874, Captain John Moresby of HMS Basilisk made a running survey of the west coast of the islands and became the first European to make landfall.

From Dobu Island, local men were recruited to work in gold mines and on copra plantations. In 1891, the Methodist Church of Australia established a mission station on Dobu Island. Another mission was established in 1898 at Bwaidoga, Mud Bay, on the south coast of Goodenough Island.

The island group became a focus of activity in World War II when Imperial Japanese troops were marooned on Goodenough Island briefly in 1942, before being attacked by the Australian 2/12th Battalion. In 1943 RAAF mobile works squadrons constructed an airfield with a 6,000 ft (1,829 m) airstrip and other facilities at Vivigani Airfield on the site of a smaller, pre-war airstrip that existed at that location.

It was used by allied forces from June 1943 to August 1944 as a staging point for operations in New Guinea and nearby occupied islands. Vivigani airstrip has been open to commercial service since 1963. A US Navy PT-Boat base was established on Fergusson Island in June 1942.

== People ==
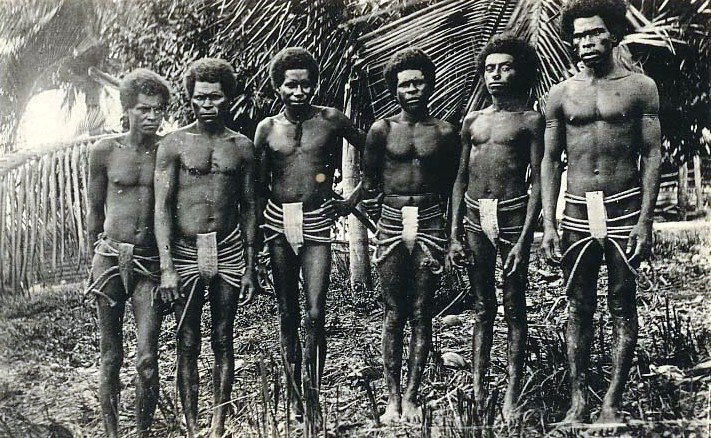
The inhabitants of D'Entrecasteaux Islands

The inhabitants of D'Entrecasteaux Islands are indigenous subsistence horticulturalists living in small, traditional settlements. People of this area produced and traded clay pots as well as participated in the Kula exchange of shell valuables, travelling widely to other islands on sea-going sailing canoes. During the more recent past, people harvested copra, trochus (sea snails) and pearl-shells and some timber for cash. Alluvial gold mining was once important and in recent years the area has been subject to mineral exploration.
