= Western Oceanic languages =

Linkage of Oceanic languages

Western Oceanic
- Geographic distribution: Western Pacific
- Linguistic classification: Austronesian: Malayo-Polynesian; Oceanic; Western Oceanic
- Proto-language: Proto-Western Oceanic
- Subdivisions: North New Guinea linkage; Meso-Melanesian linkage; Papuan Tip linkage

Language codes
- Glottolog: west2818
- Western Oceanic

The Western Oceanic languages is a linkage of Oceanic languages, proposed and studied by Ross (1988). They make up a majority of the Austronesian languages spoken in New Guinea.

== Classification ==
The West Oceanic linkage is made up of three sub-linkages:

- North New Guinea linkage
- Meso-Melanesian linkage
- Papuan Tip linkage

The center of dispersal was evidently near the Willaumez Peninsula on the north coast of New Britain.
