= List of schools in Central Province, Papua New Guinea =

This is a list of schools in Central Province, Papua New Guinea.

Papua New Guinea's education system is divided into two sections: the international school system, which is administered by the International Education Agency and offers a standard of education based on Australian or British school systems or the International Baccalaureate; and the national school system, which consists of elementary (K–2), primary (3–8) and secondary (9–11) schools. Competitive examinations are held in year 10 for entry into the country's four national high schools, of which one is located in Port Moresby, and another in Sogeri.

== Elementary and primary schools ==
Keria Ele Sch	Ward Nonou	LLG Amazon Bay	District Abau	Operator Government	Info	Notes	
Abau Island Primary School	Abau	Si'ini	Cloudy Bay	Abau		Info	
Abiara Oreke Community School	Abiara Oreke	Abiara	Kairuku	Kairuku		Info	
Abiore Elementary School	Abiore	Bereina Urban	Kairuku	Kairuku	Catholic	Info	
Ade Elementary School	Ade	Ade/Ebu	Amazon Bay	Abau		Info	
Aipeana Elementary School	Aipeana	Aipeana	Mekeo Kuni	Kairuku	Catholic	Info	
Airiauka Elementary School	Ariauku	Upper Mount Brown	Rigo Inland	Rigo	Others	Info	
Akufa Elementary School	Akufa	Ameiaka	Mekeo Kuni	Kairuku	Catholic	Info	
Ala'ala Primary School	Ala'ala	Nara	Kairuku	Kairuku		Info	
Alepa / Konakou Elementary School	Alepa	Ormand East	Rigo Inland	Rigo		Info	
Alepa Elementary School	Alepa	Ormand East	Rigo Inland	Rigo		Info	
Alepa Girabumagana Primary School	Alepa	Ormand East	Rigo Inland	Rigo		Info	
Alewai Community School	Alewai	Irupara	Rigo Central	Rigo	Adventist	Info	
Alukuni Elementary School	Alukuni	Alukuni	Rigo Coastal	Rigo		Info	
Amapokina Elementary School	Amapokina	Waima Abiara	Kairuku	Kairuku	Catholic	Info	
Amau Elementary School	Amau	Amau	Cloudy Bay	Abau		Info	
Amiaka Community School	Ameiaka	Ameiaka	Mekeo Kuni	Kairuku	Catholic	Info	
Amiaka Elementary School	Ameiaka	Ameiaka	Mekeo Kuni	Kairuku	Catholic	Info	
Amoamo Elementary School	Amoamo	Rarai	Mekeo Kuni	Kairuku	Catholic	Info	
Apaeva Adventist Community School	Apaeva	Robinson River	Cloudy Bay	Abau	Adventist	Info	
Apanaipi Elementary School	Apanaipi	Apanaipi	Mekeo Kuni	Kairuku	Catholic	Info	
Aroana Elementary School	Aroana	Ade/Ebu	Amazon Bay	Abau		Info	
Aroma Primary School	Maopa	Maopa	Aroma	Abau		Info	
Ataipo Community School	Enaugagave	Rupila	Guari	Goilala	Catholic	Info	
Ataipo Elementary School	Enaugagave	Rupila	Guari	Goilala	Catholic	Info	
Avabadina Elementary School	Avabadina	Gabadi/Pinu	Kairuku	Kairuku	United	Info	
Avabadina Primary School	Avabadina	Gabadi/Pinu	Kairuku	Kairuku	United	Info	
Avai'i Elementary School	Avai'i	Aipeana	Mekeo Kuni	Kairuku	Catholic	Info	
Avele Elementary School	Avele	Dilava	Woitape	Goilala		Info	
Babaga Elementary School	Babaga	Babaga (Saroa)	Rigo Central	Rigo		Info	
Babaka Elementary School	Babaka	Babaka	Rigo Coastal	Rigo		Info	
Babiko Elementary School	Babiko	Babiko	Kairuku	Kairuku	Catholic	Info	
Baea Kauru (Merani State) Elementary School	Merani P.	Baramata	Cloudy Bay	Abau		Info	
Baibara Primary School	Baibara	Dorio/Bua	Amazon Bay	Abau		Info	
Bailebo Elementary School	Bailebo	Barauoro	Amazon Bay	Abau	United	Info	
Bailebo Primary School	Bailebo	Barauoro	Amazon Bay	Abau	United	Info	
Bakoiudu Elementary School	near Madiu	Bakoiudu	Mekeo Kuni	Kairuku	Catholic	Info	
Bakoiudu Primary School	near Madiu	Bakoiudu	Mekeo Kuni	Kairuku	Catholic	Info	
Bam Community School	Bam	Doma	Cloudy Bay	Abau			
Bam Elementary School	Bam	Doma	Cloudy Bay	Abau		Info	
Barakau Elementary School	Barakau	Barakau	Hiri	Kairuku	United	Info	
Barakau Primary School	Barakau	Barakau	Hiri	Kairuku		Info	
Baramata Elementary School	Baramata	Baramata	Cloudy Bay	Abau		Info	
Baramata Primary School	Baramata	Baramata	Cloudy Bay	Abau		Info	
Bebeo Elementary School	Bebeo	Bebeo	Mekeo Kuni	Kairuku	Catholic	Info	
Belavista Primary School	Belavista	Fane	Woitape	Goilala	Catholic	Info	
Bereadabu Community School	Bereadabu	Bereadabu	Koiari	Kairuku		Info	
Bereadabu Elementary School	Bereadabu	Bereadabu	Koiari	Kairuku		Info	
Bereina Primary School	Bereina	Bereina Urban	Kairuku	Kairuku	Catholic	Info	
Bereina Station Elementary School	Bereina	Bereina Urban	Kairuku	Kairuku	Catholic	Info	
Bereina Village Elementary	Bereina	Bereina Urban	Kairuku	Kairuku	Catholic	Info	
Berere Elementary School	Berere	Vanapa	Hiri	Kairuku		Info	
Bigairuka Elementary School	Bigairuka	Bigairuka	Rigo Central	Rigo	United	Info	
Bila'ala Adventist Elementary School	Bila'ala	Robinson River	Cloudy Bay	Abau	Adventist	Info	
Bila'ala Adventist Primary School	Bila'ala	Robinson River	Cloudy Bay	Abau	Adventist	Info	
Bina Elementary School	Babagarupu	Babagarupu	Rigo Coastal	Rigo	United	Info	
Bina Primary School	Babagarupu	Babagarupu	Rigo Coastal	Rigo	United	Info	
Binagoro Elementary School	Binagoro	Central Boku/Doromu	Rigo Inland	Rigo		Info	
Biotou Primary School	Biotou	Biotou	Kairuku	Kairuku		Info	
Bisiatabu Adventist Community School	Bisiatabu	Depo (Mageri)	Koiari	Kairuku	Adventist	Info	
Blessed Peter To Rot Community School	Tapini	Tapini Urban	Tapini	Goilala	Catholic	Info	
Bodinumu Community School	Bodinumu	Boridi	Koiari	Kairuku		Info	
Boera Elementary School	Boera	Boera	Hiri	Kairuku		Info	
Boera Primary School	Boera	Boera	Hiri	Kairuku		Info	
Bogaramaka Elementary School	Bogaramaka	Central Maria	Rigo Inland	Rigo	United	Info	
Boine Elementary School	Boine	Suria/Kotoi	Koiari	Kairuku	Catholic	Info	
Boku Primary School	Nogomaka	Central Boku/Doromu	Rigo Inland	Rigo	United	Info	
Boku/Libuna Elementary School	Libuna	Central Boku/Doromu	Rigo Inland	Rigo	United	Info	
Bomua Elementary School	Bomua	Malaoro/Kenene	Amazon Bay	Abau		Info	
Bonanamo Community School	Bonanamo	Bonanamo	Rigo Coastal	Rigo	United	Info	
Bonanamo Elementary School	Bonanamo	Bonanamo	Rigo Coastal	Rigo	United	Info	
Bonua Elementary School	Bonua	Daena/Warumana	Amazon Bay	Abau		Info	
Bore Community School	Bore	Bore	Rigo Central	Rigo		Info	
Bore Elementary School	Bore	Bore	Rigo Central	Rigo		Info	
Borebo Elementary School	Borebo	Launoga	Amazon Bay	Abau		Info	
Borebo Primary School	Borebo	Launoga	Amazon Bay	Abau		Info	
Boredabu Elementary School	Boredabu	Kahitana	Koiari	Kairuku		Info	
Boregaina Elementary School	Boregaina	Boregaina	Rigo Central	Rigo		Info	
Boregaina Primary School	Boregaina	Boregaina	Rigo Central	Rigo		Info	
Borudiula Elementary School	Boru	Boru	Cloudy Bay	Abau	United	Info	
Borudiula Primary School	Boru	Boru	Cloudy Bay	Abau	United	Info	
Boteka Elementary School	Boteka	Boteka	Hiri	Kairuku		Info	
Brown River Elementary School	Brown River	Brown River	Hiri	Kairuku	Catholic	Info	
Brown River Primary School	Brown River	Brown River	Hiri	Kairuku	Catholic	Info	
Bukuku Community School	Bukuku	Bukuku	Aroma	Abau		Info	
Bukuku Elementary School	Bukuku	Bukuku	Aroma	Abau		Info	
Chiria Elementary School	Chiria	Chiria	Kairuku	Kairuku	Catholic	Info	
Cocoalands Elementary School	Cocoalands	Merani	Cloudy Bay	Abau		Info	
Cocoalands Primary School	Cocoalands	Merani	Cloudy Bay	Abau		Info	
Daerube Elementary School	Daerube		Rigo Inland	Rigo		Info	
Dagona Elementary School	Karekodobu	Karekodobu	Rigo Central	Rigo		Info	
Dagona Primary School	Karekodobu	Karekodobu	Rigo Central	Rigo		Info	
Dagune Elementary School	Dagune	Launoga	Amazon Bay	Abau		Info	
Dakeva Komana Elementary School	Dakeva Komana	Lower Mount Brown	Rigo Inland	Rigo		Info	
Darava Elementary School	Darava	Daena/Warumana	Amazon Bay	Abau	United	Info	
Daroa Elementary School	Daroakomana	Daroakomana	Rigo Central	Rigo		Info	
Daumagini Elementary School	Saroa	Saroa	Rigo Central	Rigo		Info	
Daumagini Primary School	Saroa	Saroa	Rigo Central	Rigo		Info	
Debadogoro Elementary School	Debadogolo	Lower Boku/Doromu	Rigo Inland	Rigo		Info	
Deboismenu Primary School	Kanosia	Malati	Kairuku	Kairuku	Catholic	Info	
Delebai Elementary School	Delebai	Ade/Ebu	Amazon Bay	Abau		Info	
Delena Elementary School	Delena	Delena	Kairuku	Kairuku	United	Info	
Delena Primary School	Delena	Delena	Kairuku	Kairuku	United	Info	
Depo Elementary School	Depo	Depo (Mageri)	Koiari	Kairuku		Info	
Deugolo Elementary School	Deugolo	Tagana	Rigo Coastal	Rigo		Info	
Didigoro Community School	Dirigolo	Central Mount Brown	Rigo Inland	Rigo	Catholic	Info	
Didigoro Elementary School	Dirigolo	Central Mount Brown	Rigo Inland	Rigo	Catholic	Info	
Diguarobu Elementary School	Diguarobu	Ormand Central	Rigo Inland	Rigo	Catholic	Info	
Diguarobu Primary School	Diguarobu	Ormand Central	Rigo Inland	Rigo	Catholic	Info	
Diumana Elementary School	Diumana	Nara	Kairuku	Kairuku		Info	
Doe Elementary School	Doe	Doe	Koiari	Kairuku		Info	
Dom Elementary School	Dom	Dom	Cloudy Bay	Abau		Info	
Doma Elementary School	Doma	Robinson River	Cloudy Bay	Abau	Others	Info	
Domara Elementary School	Domara	Domara	Cloudy Bay	Abau		Info	
Domara Mainland Elementary School	Domara	Domara	Cloudy Bay	Abau		Info	
Domara Adventist Primary School	Domara	Domara	Cloudy Bay	Abau	Adventist	Info	
Dorobisoro Elementary School	Dorobisoro	Upper Mount Obree	Rigo Inland	Rigo	United	Info	
Doromu Elementary School	Efaika	Upper Boku/Doromu	Rigo Inland	Rigo	Catholic	Info	
Dubana Teboa Elementary School	Dubana Teboa	Ormand East	Rigo Inland	Rigo	Adventist	Info	
Dubi Elementary School	Boridi	Boridi	Koiari	Kairuku		Info	
Duramu Elementary School	Duramu	Duramu	Cloudy Bay	Abau		Info	
Eboa Elementary School	Eboa	Eboa	Mekeo Kuni	Kairuku	Catholic	Info	
Edevu Elementary School	Edevu	Edevu	Koiari	Kairuku	Adventist		
Edevu Primary School	Edevu	Edevu	Koiari	Kairuku	Adventist	Info	
Efogi Adventist Primary School	Efogi	Efogi	Koiari	Kairuku	Adventist	Info	
Efogi Elementary School	Efogi	Efogi	Koiari	Kairuku	Adventist	Info	
Efogi Primary School	Efogi	Efogi	Koiari	Kairuku	Adventist	Info	
Egala'auna Elementary School	Egala'auna	Gaivakalana	Aroma	Abau	United	Info	
Egala'auna Primary School	Egala'auna	Gaivakalana	Aroma	Abau	United	Info	
Engefa Elementary School	Engefa	Babanongo	Mekeo Kuni	Kairuku	Catholic	Info	
Erume Primary School	Erume	Jowa	Tapini	Goilala	Catholic	Info	
Eunuoro Elementary School	Eunuoro Island	Banaoro	Amazon Bay	Abau		Info	
Fane Community School	Fane	Fane	Woitape	Goilala	Catholic	Info	
Gabagaba Elementary School	Gabagaba	Gabagaba	Rigo Coastal	Rigo		Info	
Gabagaba Primary School	Gabagaba	Gabagaba	Rigo Coastal	Rigo		Info	
Gabone Elementary School	Gabone	Gabone	Rigo Coastal	Rigo		Info	
Gabone Primary School	Gabone	Gabone	Rigo Coastal	Rigo		Info	
Gadoguina Elementary School	Gadoguina	Duramu	Cloudy Bay	Abau		Info	
Gagaifua Elementary School	Gagaifua	Inawauni	Mekeo Kuni	Kairuku	Catholic	Info	
Gaire Elementary School	Gaire	Gaire	Hiri	Kairuku		Info	
Gaire Primary School	Gaire	Gaire	Hiri	Kairuku		Info	
Gaivakalana Elementary School	Gaivakalana	Gaivakalana	Aroma	Abau		Info	
Galomarubu Elementary School	Galomarupu	Galomarupu	Rigo Coastal	Rigo		Info	
Gamoga Community School	Gamoga	Tauruba	Rigo Coastal	Rigo		Info	
Gamoga Elementary School	Gamoga	Tauruba	Rigo Coastal	Rigo		Info	
Ganai Elementary School	Ganai	Ganai	Cloudy Bay	Abau		Info	
Ganimarupu Community School	Kwalimurupu	Kwalimurupu	Rigo Central	Rigo		Info	
Ganimarupu Elementary School	Kwalimurupu	Kwalimurupu	Rigo Central	Rigo		Info	
Garima Elementary School	Garima	Auga	Woitape	Goilala	Catholic	Info	
Garima Primary School	Garima	Auga	Woitape	Goilala	Catholic	Info	
Gaunomu Elementary School	Gaunomu	Gaunomu	Rigo Central	Rigo		Info	
Gaunomu Primary School	Gaunomu	Gaunomu	Rigo Central	Rigo		Info	
Gavuone Adventist Elementary School	Gavuone	Gavuone	Aroma	Abau	Adventist	Info	
Gavuone Adventist Primary School	Gavuone	Gavuone	Aroma	Abau	Adventist	Info	
Gavuone Elementary School	Gavuone	Gavuone	Aroma	Abau		Info	
Gavuone Primary School	Gavuone	Gavuone	Aroma	Abau		Info	
Geaone Elementary School	Geagea	Banaoro	Amazon Bay	Abau		Info	
Gemo Community School	Gemo	Gemo	Rigo Coastal	Rigo		Info	
Gemo Elementary School	Gemo	Gemo	Rigo Coastal	Rigo		Info	
Gerebada Elementary School	Gerebada	Manumanu	Hiri	Kairuku	United	Info	
Geresi Elementary School	Geresi	Geresi	Rigo Central	Rigo		Info	
Gibaru Community School	Geresi	Geresi	Rigo Central	Rigo		Info	
Gidobada Elementary School	Gidobada	Gidobada	Rigo Central	Rigo		Info	
Gilatou Elementary School	Gilatou	Ormand Central	Rigo Inland	Rigo		Info	
Ginigolo Elementary School	Ginigolo	Ginigolo	Rigo Coastal	Rigo		Info	
Ginigolo Primary School	Ginigolo	Ginigolo	Rigo Coastal	Rigo		Info	
Girabu Community School	Girabu	Girabu	Rigo Central	Rigo		Info	
Girabu Elementary School	Girabu	Girabu	Rigo Central	Rigo		Info	
Gobakigoro Elementary School	Gobakigoro	Lower Mount Brown	Rigo Inland	Rigo		Info	
Gobakigoro Primary School	Gobakigoro	Lower Mount Brown	Rigo Inland	Rigo		Info	
Gogomanomu Elementary School	Gogomanomo	Upper Mount Brown	Rigo Inland	Rigo		Info	
Gohodae Adventist Elementary	Gohodae	Ganai	Cloudy Bay	Abau	Adventist	Info	
Gohodae Adventist Primary School	Gohodae	Ganai	Cloudy Bay	Abau	Adventist	Info	
Goldie Elementary School	Goldie	Laloki	Hiri	Kairuku		Info	
Goldie River Primary School	Goldie	Laloki	Hiri	Kairuku		Info	
Gomore Community School	Gomore	Gomore	Rigo Central	Rigo		Info	
Gomore Elementary School	Gomore	Gomore	Rigo Central	Rigo		Info	
Gorohu Elementary School	Gorohu	Kido	Hiri	Kairuku	United	Info	
Gorohu Primary School	Gorohu	Kido	Hiri	Kairuku	United	Info	
Goulupu Elementary School	Goulupu	Goulupu	Rigo Central	Rigo	United	Info	
Guari Elementary School	Guari Meipa	Zarima	Guari	Goilala	Catholic	Info	
Guari Meipa Community School	Guari Meipa	Zarima	Guari	Goilala	Catholic	Info	
Gunugau Elementary School	Gunugau	Gunugau	Rigo Coastal	Rigo		Info	
Gurogoro Elementary School	Gurogoro	Lower Mount Brown	Rigo Inland	Rigo		Info	
Gwarume-Mase Elementary School	Gwarume-Mase	Mount Diamond	Hiri	Kairuku		Info	
Haini/Loupom Community School	Loupom Island	Dagaea Oro/Abati	Amazon Bay	Abau	United	Info	
Henende Community School	Henende	Aduai	Woitape	Goilala	Catholic	Info	
Hereparu Elementary School	Hereparu	Kivori	Kairuku	Kairuku	Catholic	Info	
Hisiu Elementary School	Hisiu	Hisiu	Kairuku	Kairuku		Info	
Hisiu Primary School	Hisiu	Hisiu	Kairuku	Kairuku		Info	
Homenomu Elementary School	Homenomu	Upper Mount Brown	Rigo Inland	Rigo	United	Info	
Homenomu Primary School	Homenomu	Upper Mount Brown	Rigo Inland	Rigo	United	Info	
Hood Lagoon Primary School	Keapara	Keapara	Rigo Coastal	Rigo		Info	
Ianu Elementary School	Ianu	Ianu	Cloudy Bay	Abau		Info	
Ianu Primary School	Ianu	Ianu	Cloudy Bay	Abau		Info	
Ilai Community School	Ilai	Losoa/Bogia	Amazon Bay	Abau		Info	
Ilai Elementary School	Ilai	Losoa/Bogia	Amazon Bay	Abau		Info	
Ilimo Elementary School	Ilimo Farm	Mesime	Koiari	Kairuku		Info	
Imairu Magautou Elementary School	Imairu	Ormand Central	Rigo Inland	Rigo		Info	
Imila Elementary School	Imila	Upulima	Aroma	Abau		Info	
Inaina Village Elementary	Inaina	Malati	Kairuku	Kairuku	Catholic	Info	
Inaoae Elementary School	Inaoae	Inaoae	Mekeo Kuni	Kairuku	Catholic	Info	
Inauabui Elementary School	Inawabui	Inawabui	Mekeo Kuni	Kairuku	Catholic	Info	
Inauabui Primary School	Inawabui	Inawabui	Mekeo Kuni	Kairuku	Catholic	Info	
Inauaia Elementary School	Inawaia	Inawaia	Mekeo Kuni	Kairuku	Catholic	Info	
Inauaia Primary School	Inawaia	Inawaia	Mekeo Kuni	Kairuku	Catholic	Info	
Inau'auni Elementary School	Inawauni	Inawauni	Mekeo Kuni	Kairuku	Catholic	Info	
Inau'auni Primary School	Inawauni	Inawauni	Mekeo Kuni	Kairuku	Catholic	Info	
Inaujina Community School	Inaukina	Hisiu	Kairuku	Kairuku	Catholic	Info	
Inaujina Elementary School	Inaukina	Hisiu	Kairuku	Kairuku	Catholic	Info	
Inika Elementary School	Inika	Kubuna	Mekeo Kuni	Kairuku	Catholic	Info	
Inika Primary School	Inika	Kubuna	Mekeo Kuni	Kairuku	Catholic	Info	
Inuma Elementary School	Inuma	Ormand East	Rigo Inland	Rigo	United	Info	
Iobuna Elementary School	Mesime	Mesime	Koiari	Kairuku		Info	
Iobuna Kouba Primary School	Mesime	Mesime	Koiari	Kairuku		Info	
Ioi Elementary School	Ioi	Maipa	Mekeo Kuni	Kairuku	Catholic	Info	
Iopara Primary School	Kupiano	Kupiano	Aroma	Abau		Info	
Ipaipana Elementary School	Ipaipana	Rapa	Kairuku	Kairuku	United	Info	
Ipaipana Primary School	Ipaipana	Rapa	Kairuku	Kairuku	United	Info	
Iruale Elementary School	Irupara	Irupara	Rigo Coastal	Rigo		Info	
Iruna Elementary School	Iruna	Barauoro	Amazon Bay	Abau		Info	
Itikinumu Elementary School	Itikinumu	Kailaki	Koiari	Kairuku		Info	
Itikinumu Primary School	Itikinumu	Kailaki	Koiari	Kairuku		Info	
Jeku Elementary School	Iesubaibua	Jeku	Mekeo Kuni	Kairuku	Catholic	Info	
Kagi Elementary School	Kagi	Kagi	Koiari	Kairuku		Info	
Kailaki Community School	Kailaki	Kailaki	Koiari	Kairuku		Info	
Kailaki Elementary School	Kailaki	Kailaki	Koiari	Kairuku		Info	
Kalapa Elementary School	Kalapa	Bukuku	Aroma	Abau		Info	
Kalo Elementary School	Kalo	Kalo	Rigo Coastal	Rigo		Info	
Kalo Primary School	Kalo	Kalo	Rigo Coastal	Rigo		Info	
Kamali Elementary School	Kamali	Kamali	Rigo Coastal	Rigo		Info	
Kamali Primary School	Kamali	Kamali	Rigo Coastal	Rigo		Info	
Kambise Community School	Kambise	Aduai	Woitape	Goilala	Catholic	Info	
Kapari Elementary School	Kapari	Kapari	Aroma	Abau		Info	
Kaparoko Community School	Kaparoko	Kaparoko	Rigo Coastal	Rigo		Info	
Kaparoko Elementary School	Kaparoko	Kaparoko	Rigo Coastal	Rigo		Info	
Karai Komana Elementary School	Karai Komana	Upper Maria	Rigo Inland	Rigo		Info	
Karawa Elementary School	Karawa	Karawa	Rigo Coastal	Rigo	United	Info	
Kavovo Primary School	Kavovo	Kagi	Koiari	Kairuku		Info	
Keagolo Elementary School	Keagolo	Waro/Iruone	Aroma	Abau		Info	
Keagolo Primary School	Keagolo	Waro/Iruone	Aroma	Abau		Info	
Keakaro Elementary School	Keakaro	Banaoro	Amazon Bay	Abau		Info	
Keapara Elementary School	Keapara	Keapara	Rigo Coastal	Rigo		Info	
Keiva Elementary	Keiva	Kido	Hiri	Kairuku		Info	
Kelerakwa Elementary School	Kelerakwa	Kelerakwa	Aroma	Abau		Info	
Kelerakwa Primary School	Kelerakwa	Kelerakwa	Aroma	Abau		Info	
Kemabolo Elementary School	Kemabolo	Kemabolo	Rigo Coastal	Rigo		Info	
Kemabolo Primary School	Kemabolo	Kemabolo	Rigo Coastal	Rigo		Info	
Kemaea Elementary School	Kemaea	Kemaea	Rigo Central	Rigo		Info	
Kerea Elementary School	Kerea	Kerea	Hiri	Kairuku		Info	
Kerea Primary School	Kerea	Kerea	Hiri	Kairuku		Info	
Kerekadi Community School	Kerekadi	Barakau	Hiri	Kairuku		Info	
Kerekadi Elementary School	Kerekadi	Barakau	Hiri	Kairuku		Info	
Kido Elementary School	Kido	Kido	Hiri	Kairuku	United	Info	
Kido Primary School	Kido	Kido	Hiri	Kairuku	United	Info	
Kileipi Community School	Kileipi	Sopu	Tapini	Goilala	Catholic	Info	
Kiru (Central) Elementary School	Kiru	East Maria	Rigo Inland	Rigo		Info	
Kivori Primary School	Kivori-Kui	Kivori	Kairuku	Kairuku	Catholic	Info	
Kodige Community School	Kodige	Dilava	Woitape	Goilala	Catholic	Info	
Kodige Elementary School	Kodige	Dilava	Woitape	Goilala	Catholic	Info	
Koefa Community School	Koefa	Kamulai	Guari	Goilala	Catholic	Info	
Koefa Elementary School	Koefa	Kamulai	Guari	Goilala	Catholic	Info	
Koiari Park Adventist Primary School	Iove	Rigo Koiari Iove	Rigo Central	Rigo	Adventist	Info	
Koiava Elementary School	Koiava	Loloipa	Tapini	Goilala	Catholic	Info	
Koiloa Elementary School	Koiloa	Jowa	Tapini	Goilala	Catholic	Info	
Kokorogoro Elementary School	Kokorogolo	Lower Boku/Doromu	Rigo Inland	Rigo		Info	
Kokorogoro Primary School	Kokorogolo	Lower Boku/Doromu	Rigo Inland	Rigo		Info	
Kone Primary School	Kone	Auga	Woitape	Goilala	Catholic	Info	
Konepoti Primary School	Konepoti	Kapari	Aroma	Abau		Info	
Kore Community School	Kore	Central Boku/Doromu	Rigo Inland	Rigo		Info	
Kore Elementary School	Kore	Central Boku/Doromu	Rigo Inland	Rigo		Info	
Koruleva Elementary School	Korunomu	Central Mount Brown	Rigo Inland	Rigo		Info	
Koruleva Primary School	Korunomu	Central Mount Brown	Rigo Inland	Rigo		Info	
Kosipe Community School	Kosipi	Woitape	Woitape	Goilala	Catholic	Info	Established 1958ril
Kouderika Elementary School	Kouderika	Porebada	Hiri	Kairuku		Info	
Koupuana Elementary School	Koupuana	Gabadi/Pinu	Kairuku	Kairuku	United	Info	
Kovetapa Elementary School	Kovetapa	Kataipa	Tapini	Goilala	Catholic	Info	
Kubuna Elementary School	Kubuna	Kubuna	Mekeo Kuni	Kairuku	Catholic	Info	
Kubuna Primary School	Kubuna	Kubuna	Mekeo Kuni	Kairuku	Catholic	Info	
Kulama Community School	Kulama	Aduai	Woitape	Goilala	Catholic	Info	
Kulama Elementary School	Kulama	Aduai	Woitape	Goilala	Catholic	Info	
Kupiano Elementary School	Kupiano	Kupiano Urban	Aroma	Abau		Info	
Kurere-Asiaro Elementary School	Kurere-Asiaro	Barauoro	Amazon Bay	Abau		Info	
Kuriva Elementary School	Kuriva	Akuku	Hiri	Kairuku	Catholic	Info	
Kwaipo Community School	Gwaibo	Ormand West	Rigo Inland	Rigo		Info	
Kwaipo Elementary School	Gwaibo	Ormand West	Rigo Inland	Rigo		Info	
Kwapeupa Elementary School	Kelekapana	Kelekapana	Aroma	Abau		Info	
Kware Community School	Kwale	Kwale	Rigo Central	Rigo		Info	
Kware Elementary School	Kwale	Kwale	Rigo Central	Rigo		Info	
Labu Elementary School	Labu	Daena/Warumana	Amazon Bay	Abau		Info	
Lahara Elementary School	Lahara	Domara	Cloudy Bay	Abau		Info	
Lalaura Elementary School	Lalaura	Lalaura	Aroma	Abau		Info	
Lapeka Elementary School	Lapeka	Kubuna	Mekeo Kuni	Kairuku	Catholic	Info	
Laruoro Community School	Laruoro Island	Danava/Goiseoro	Amazon Bay	Abau		Info	
Laruoro Elementary School	Laruoro Island	Danava/Goiseoro	Amazon Bay	Abau		Info	
Launakalana Elementary School	Launakalana	Goulupu	Rigo Central	Rigo		Info	
Launakalana Primary School	Launakalana	Goulupu	Rigo Central	Rigo		Info	
Lealea Elementary School	Lealea	Gabadi/Pinu	Hiri	Kairuku		Info	
Lealea Primary School	Lealea	Gabadi/Pinu	Hiri	Kairuku		Info	
Lebogoro Elementary School	Lebagolo	West Maria	Rigo Inland	Rigo		Info	
Lebogoro Primary School	Lebagolo	West Maria	Rigo Inland	Rigo		Info	
Loupom Elementary School	Loupom Island	Dagaea Oro/Abati	Amazon Bay	Abau	United	Info	
Ma'akunga Elementary School	Ma'akunga	Babanongo	Mekeo Kuni	Kairuku	Catholic	Info	
Madana Elementary School	Madana	Kelekapana	Aroma	Abau		Info	
Magabaira Elementary School	Magavaira	Gabadi/Pinu	Kairuku	Kairuku		Info	
Magarida Primary School	Magarida	Barauoro	Amazon Bay	Abau		Info	
Magaubo Community School	Magaubo	Boru	Cloudy Bay	Abau		Info	
Magore Elementary School	Magore	Dagaea Oro/Abati	Amazon Bay	Abau		Info	
Mailu Elementary School	Mailu Island	Danava/Goiseoro	Amazon Bay	Abau	United	Info	
Mailu Island Primary School	Mailu Island	Danava/Goiseoro	Amazon Bay	Abau	United	Info	
Maini Community School	Maitu	Ivani	Tapini	Goilala	Catholic	Info	
Mainohana Elementary School	near Bereina	Abiara	Kairuku	Kairuku	Catholic	Info	
Mainowiga Community School	Diri Komana	Lower Mount Brown	Rigo Inland	Rigo	United	Info	
Mainowiga Elementary School	Diri Komana	Lower Mount Brown	Rigo Inland	Rigo	United	Info	
Maipa Elementary School	Maipa	Maipa	Mekeo Kuni	Kairuku	Catholic	Info	
Makerupu Elementary School	Makerupu	Makerupu	Rigo Coastal	Rigo		Info	
Mamalo Elementary School	Mamalo	Ormand West	Rigo Inland	Rigo		Info	
Manabo Elementary School	Manabo	Manabo	Cloudy Bay	Abau		Info	
Manabo Primary School	Manabo	Manabo	Cloudy Bay	Abau		Info	
Manari Elementary School	Manari	Manari	Koiari	Kairuku		Info	
Manea Manea Primary School	Hula	Hula	Rigo Coastal	Rigo		Info	
Manugoro Community School	Manugoro	Manugoro	Rigo Central	Rigo		Info	
Manugoro Elementary School	Manugoro	Manugoro	Rigo Central	Rigo		Info	
Manumanu Elementary School	Manumanu	Manumanu	Hiri	Kairuku	United	Info	
Manumanu Primary School	Manumanu	Manumanu	Hiri	Kairuku	United	Info	
Maopa 1 Elementary School	Maopa	Maopa	Aroma	Abau		Info	
Maopa 2 Elementary School	Maopa	Maopa	Aroma	Abau		Info	
Maroromu Elementary School	Maroromu	Upper Mount Brown	Rigo Inland	Rigo		Info	
Matairuka Community School	Matairuka	Ormand West	Rigo Inland	Rigo		Info	
Matairuka Elementary School	Matairuka	Ormand West	Rigo Inland	Rigo		Info	
Matanatou Primary School	Matanatou	Central Boku/Doromu	Rigo Inland	Rigo		Info	
Meauri Elementary School	Meauri	Kivori	Kairuku	Kairuku	United	Info	
Medene Elementary School	Medene	Rigo Koiari Iove	Rigo Central	Rigo		Info	
Merani Elementary School	Merani	Baramata	Cloudy Bay	Abau		Info	
Mogubo Elementary School	Mogubo	Danava/Goiseoro	Amazon Bay	Abau	United	Info	
Mondo Community School	Mondo	Fane	Woitape	Goilala	Catholic	Info	
Moreguina Elementary School	Moreguina	Moreguina Urban	Cloudy Bay	Abau		Info	
Moreguina Primary School	Moreguina	Moreguina Urban	Cloudy Bay	Abau		Info	
Mou Elementary School	Mou	Mou	Kairuku	Kairuku	Catholic	Info	
Mumuiru Elementary School	Mumuiru	Central Maria	Rigo Inland	Rigo		Info	
Nabai Elementary School	Nabai	Dorio/Bua	Amazon Bay	Abau		Info	
Nabua Community School	Nabuapaka	Nabuapaka	Kairuku	Kairuku		Info	
Nabua Elementary School	Nabuapaka	Nabuapaka	Kairuku	Kairuku		Info	
Naduri Elementary School	Naduri	Kagi	Koiari	Kairuku		Info	
Naire Elementary School	Naile	Jowa	Tapini	Goilala	Catholic	Info	
Nauna Elementary School	Nauna	Doma	Cloudy Bay	Abau		Info	
New Town Elementary School	Moreguina	Moreguina Urban	Cloudy Bay	Abau	Catholic	Info	
Nikura Elementary School	Nikura	Delena	Kairuku	Kairuku	Catholic	Info	
Nikura Primary School	Nikura	Delena	Kairuku	Kairuku	Catholic	Info	
Niuiruka Elementary School	Niuiruka	Niuiruka	Rigo Central	Rigo	United	Info	
Nobone Community School	Nobone	Central Maria	Rigo Inland	Rigo		Info	
Nogomaka Elementary School	Nogomaka	Central Boku/Doromu	Rigo Inland	Rigo	United	Info	
Nora Elementary School	Nora	Aloke/Nonou	Amazon Bay	Abau		Info	
Nunumai Elementary School	Nunumai	Malaoro/Kenene	Amazon Bay	Abau	United	Info	
Nunumai Primary School	Nunumai	Malaoro/Kenene	Amazon Bay	Abau	United	Info	
Ogotana Elementary School	Ogotana	Ogotana	Koiari	Kairuku		Info	
Oiko Elementary School	Oiko		Amazon Bay	Abau		Info	
Olivi Elementary School	Olivi	Zarima	Guari	Goilala	Catholic	Info	
Omu Elementary School	Omuitu	Zhake	Guari	Goilala	Catholic	Info	
Omu Primary School	Omuitu	Zhake	Guari	Goilala	Catholic	Info	
Ononge (Dubuy) Primary School	Ononge	Ononge	Woitape	Goilala	Catholic	Info	
Ononge Elementary School	Ononge	Ononge	Woitape	Goilala	Catholic	Info	
Opogo Elementary School	Opogo		Mekeo Kuni	Kairuku	Catholic	Info	
Ori Elementary School	Ori	Dorio/Bua	Amazon Bay	Abau		Info	
Origo Community School	Kouoro	Upper Maria	Rigo Inland	Rigo		Info	
Oriropetana Elementary School	Oriropetana	Bebeo	Mekeo Kuni	Kairuku	Catholic	Info	
Oriropetana Primary School	Oriropetana	Bebeo	Mekeo Kuni	Kairuku	Catholic	Info	
Oroi Community School	Oroi	Nara	Kairuku	Kairuku	United	Info	
Oroi Elementary School	Oroi	Nara	Kairuku	Kairuku	United	Info	
Papa Elementary School	Papa	Papa	Hiri	Kairuku		Info	
Papa Primary School	Papa	Papa	Hiri	Kairuku		Info	
Papagogo Elementary School	Papagogo	Ameiaka	Mekeo Kuni	Kairuku	Catholic	Info	
Papagogo Primary School	Papagogo	Ameiaka	Mekeo Kuni	Kairuku	Catholic	Info	
Paramana Community School	Paramana	Paramana	Aroma	Abau		Info	
Paramana Elementary School	Paramana	Paramana	Aroma	Abau		Info	
Pelagai Elementary School	Pelagai	Pelagai	Aroma	Abau		Info	
Pinu Community School	Pinu	Gabadi/Pinu	Kairuku	Kairuku		Info	
Pinu Elementary School	Pinu	Gabadi/Pinu	Kairuku	Kairuku		Info	
Pinupaka Primary School	Pinupaka	Chiria	Kairuku	Kairuku	Catholic	Info	
Piunga Elementary School	Piunga	Ameiaka	Mekeo Kuni	Kairuku	Catholic	Info	
Polomania Community School	Iguai	Auga	Woitape	Goilala	Catholic	Info	
Polomania Elementary School	Iguai	Auga	Woitape	Goilala	Catholic	Info	
Pomutu Elementary School	Pomutu	Jowa	Tapini	Goilala	Catholic	Info	
Porebada Elementary School	Porebada	Porebada	Hiri	Kairuku		Info	
Porebada Primary School	Porebada	Porebada	Hiri	Kairuku		Info	
Poukama Elementary School	Poukama	Delena	Kairuku	Kairuku	Catholic	Info	
Prince William Community School	Doe	Doe	Koiari	Kairuku		Info	
Rabuka Elementary School	Rabuka	Barakau	Hiri	Kairuku		Info	
Ranika Pre School	Saroa	Saroa	Rigo Central	Rigo		Info	
Rapa Elementary School	Rapa	Rapa	Kairuku	Kairuku	Catholic	Info	
Rarai Elementary School	Rarai	Rarai	Mekeo Kuni	Kairuku	Catholic	Info	
Rarai Primary School	Rarai	Rarai	Mekeo Kuni	Kairuku	Catholic	Info	
Ravizakou Elementary School	Ravizakou	Zarima	Guari	Goilala	Catholic	Info	
Rilo Primary School	Babaka	Babaka	Rigo Coastal	Rigo		Info	
Roku Elementary School	Roku	Roku	Hiri	Kairuku		Info	
Roku Primary School	Roku	Roku	Hiri	Kairuku		Info	
Rouna Elementary School	Rouna	Furimuti	Koiari	Kairuku		Info	
Ruatoka Elementary School	Kwikila	Kwikila Urban	Rigo Central	Rigo	United	Info	
Ruatoka Primary School	Kwikila	Kwikila Urban	Rigo Central	Rigo	United	Info	
Rupila Community School	Rupila	Rupila	Guari	Goilala	Catholic	Info	
Rupila Elementary School	Rupila	Rupila	Guari	Goilala	Catholic	Info	
Sabiribo Elementary School	Sabiribo	Losoa/Bogia	Amazon Bay	Abau		Info	
Sabuia Community School	Sabuia	Manugoro	Rigo Central	Rigo		Info	
Sabusa Elementary School	Sabusa	Boteka	Hiri	Kairuku		Info	
Sabusa Primary School	Sabusa	Boteka	Hiri	Kairuku		Info	
Sanomu Elementary School	Sanomu	Upper Mount Brown	Rigo Inland	Rigo		Info	
Saroakeina Elementary School	Saroakeina	Saroakeina	Rigo Central	Rigo		Info	
Saroakeina Primary School	Saroakeina	Saroakeina	Rigo Central	Rigo		Info	
Saseva Elementary School	Saseva	Lower Mount Obree	Rigo Inland	Rigo		Info	
Seba Elementary School	Seba	Lower Boku/Doromu	Rigo Inland	Rigo		Info	
Segiri Elementary School	Segiri	Robinson River	Cloudy Bay	Abau		Info	
Seme-Dagoda Elementary School	Seme	Dagoda	Hiri	Kairuku		Info	
Seme-Dagoda Primary School	Seme	Dagoda	Hiri	Kairuku		Info	
Senunu Elementary School	Senunu	Manugoro	Rigo Central	Rigo	United	Info	
Si'ini Elementary School	Si'ini	Si'ini	Cloudy Bay	Abau		Info	
Sirinumu Elementary School	Manamiro	Berebei	Koiari	Kairuku		Info	
Sirinumu Primary School	Manamiro	Berebei	Koiari	Kairuku		Info	
Sivigoro Elementary School	Sivigolo	Sivitatana	Rigo Central	Rigo		Info	
Sivitatana Elementary School	Sivitatana	Sivitatana	Rigo Central	Rigo		Info	
Sivitatana Primary School	Sivitatana	Sivitatana	Rigo Central	Rigo		Info	
Sogeri Elementary School	Sogeri	Sogeri Urban	Koiari	Kairuku		Info	
Sogeri Primary School	Sogeri	Sogeri Urban	Koiari	Kairuku		Info	
Sopu Community School	Sopu	Sopu	Tapini	Goilala	Catholic	Info	
St Anne's Community School	Kerau	Kerau	Tapini	Goilala	Catholic	Info	
St Anthony Elementary School	Yule Island	Chiria	Kairuku	Kairuku	Catholic	Info	
St Benedict Elementary School	Adio	Kubuna	Mekeo Kuni	Kairuku	Catholic	Info	
St Francis Xavier Primary School	Galebagiu	Lower Mount Brown	Rigo Inland	Rigo	Catholic	Info	
St John Imounga Community School	Imounga	Inawauni	Mekeo Kuni	Kairuku	Catholic	Info	
St John's Primary School	Kuriva	Akuku	Hiri	Kairuku	Catholic	Info	
St Joseph's Community School	Ioi	Maipa	Mekeo Kuni	Kairuku	Catholic	Info	
St Joseph's Community School	Yongai	Chirime	Woitape	Goilala	Catholic	Info	
St Louis De Mont Fort Elementary School	Biotou	Biotou	Kairuku	Kairuku	Catholic	Info	
St Mary's Afagaifi Primary School	Apanaipi	Apanaipi	Mekeo Kuni	Kairuku	Catholic	Info	
St Mary's Primary School	Inawi	Inaui	Mekeo Kuni	Kairuku	Catholic	Info	
St Michael Catholic Primary School	Amapokina	Waima Abiara	Kairuku	Kairuku	Catholic	Info	
St Michael's Primary School	Akufa	Ameiaka	Mekeo Kuni	Kairuku	Catholic	Info	
St Paul's Primary School	Veifa'a	Veifa'a	Mekeo Kuni	Kairuku	Catholic	Info	
St Rock Maipa Primary School	Maipa	Maipa	Mekeo Kuni	Kairuku	Catholic	Info	
St Stephens Primary School	Moreguina	Moreguina Urban	Cloudy Bay	Abau	Catholic	Info	
St Theresa Primary School	Eneo	Lower Kuni	Mekeo Kuni	Kairuku	Catholic	Info	
Tabunomu Community School	Tabunomu	Dirinomu	Rigo Central	Rigo		Info	
Tabunomu Elementary School	Tabunomu	Dirinomu	Rigo Central	Rigo		Info	
Tagana Elementary School	Tagana	Tagana	Rigo Coastal	Rigo		Info	
Tapini Elementary School	Tapini	Tapini Urban	Tapini	Goilala	Catholic	Info	
Tauruba Elementary School	Tauruba	Tauruba	Rigo Coastal	Rigo		Info	
Tauruba Primary School	Tauruba	Tauruba	Rigo Coastal	Rigo		Info	
Taveve Elementary School	Taveve	Zarima	Guari	Goilala		Info	
Tavuni- Kame Elementary School	Tawuni	Kataipa	Tapini	Goilala		Info	
Tolopo Primary School	Kelekapana	Kelekapana	Aroma	Abau		Info	
Tolukuma Community School	Yulai	Fane	Woitape	Goilala		Info	
Topa Elementary School	Topa		Tapini	Goilala	Catholic	Info	
Toule Adventist Primary School	Goata	East Maria	Rigo Inland	Rigo	Adventist	Info	
Tubu Elementary	Tubu	Nara	Kairuku	Kairuku	United	Info	
Tubusereia Elementary School	Tubusereia	Tubusereia	Hiri	Kairuku		Info	
Tubusereia Primary School	Tubusereia	Tubusereia	Hiri	Kairuku		Info	
Tutubu Elementary School	Tutubu	Tutubu	Cloudy Bay	Abau		Info	
Ubuna Elementary School	Ubuna	Launoga	Amazon Bay	Abau		Info	
Ukaukana Elementary School	Ukaukuna	Gabadi/Pinu	Kairuku	Kairuku		Info	
Ununomu Elementary School	Ununomu	Upper Mount Brown	Rigo Inland	Rigo		Info	
Upulima Elementary School	Upulima	Upulima	Aroma	Abau		Info	
Upulima Primary School	Upulima	Upulima	Aroma	Abau		Info	
Uruna Elementary School	Uruna	Woitape	Woitape	Goilala	Catholic	Info	
Vanapa Elementary School	Vanapa	Vanapa	Hiri	Kairuku		Info	
Vanuamai Community School	Vanuamai	Nara	Kairuku	Kairuku	Catholic	Info	
Vanuamai Elementary School	Vanuamai	Nara	Kairuku	Kairuku	Catholic	Info	
Varama Elementary School	Varama	Brown River	Hiri	Kairuku	Catholic	Info	
Varokogena Community School	Vorakogena	East Maria	Rigo Inland	Rigo	United	Info	
Varokogena Elementary School	Vorakogena	East Maria	Rigo Inland	Rigo	United	Info	
Vasira Community School	Vasira	Vasira	Rigo Central	Rigo		Info	
Vasira Elementary School	Vasira	Vasira	Rigo Central	Rigo		Info	
Vatugoro Community School	Imuagoro	Imuagoro	Rigo Central	Rigo	United	Info	
Vatugoro Elementary School	Imuagoro	Imuagoro	Rigo Central	Rigo	United	Info	
Veifa'a Elementary School	Veifa'a	Veifa'a	Mekeo Kuni	Kairuku	Catholic	Info	
Veroi Community School	Veroi	Aloke/Nonou	Amazon Bay	Abau		Info	
Vesilogo Elementary School	Vesilogo	Vesilogo	Koiari	Kairuku	Adventist	Info	
Viriolo Elementary School	Viriolo	Kapari	Aroma	Abau		Info	
Visi Community School	Visi	Ononge	Woitape	Goilala	Catholic	Info	
Vulaa Elementary School	Vulaa	Hula	Rigo Coastal	Rigo	United	Info	
Vuru Elementary School	Vuru	Wairavanua	Aroma	Abau		Info	
Waeagai Elementary School	Vaiagai	Vaiagai	Koiari	Kairuku		Info	
Waika Elementary School	Waika	Apanaipi	Mekeo Kuni	Kairuku	Catholic	Info	
Waima Catholic Elementary School	Amapokina	Waima Abiara	Kairuku	Kairuku	Catholic	Info	
Waima United Church Elementary School	Ere'ere	Waima/Kore	Kairuku	Kairuku	United	Info	
Waima United Church Primary School	Ere'ere	Waima/Kore	Kairuku	Kairuku	United	Info	
Waiori Community School	Waiori	Waiori	Aroma	Abau		Info	
Waiori Elementary School	Waiori	Waiori	Aroma	Abau		Info	
Wairavanua Elementary School	Wairavanua	Wairavanua	Aroma	Abau		Info	
Wairavanua Primary School	Wairavanua	Wairavanua	Aroma	Abau		Info	
Walai Elementary School	Walai	Walai	Rigo Coastal	Rigo		Info	
Wama Elementary School	Wama	Malati	Kairuku	Kairuku	Catholic	Info	
Wanigela Elementary School	Wanigela	Wanigela	Aroma	Abau		Info	
Wapote (Nerive) Elementary School	Wapote	Pilitu	Tapini	Goilala	Catholic	Info	
Wapote/Tutana Elementary School	Wapote	Pilitu	Tapini	Goilala	Catholic	Info	
Waro Community School	Waro	Waro/Iruone	Aroma	Abau		Info	
Waro Elementary School	Waro	Waro/Iruone	Aroma	Abau		Info	
Woitape Primary School	Woitape	Woitape Station	Woitape	Goilala	Catholic	Info	
Yagabo Community School	Dirinomu	Dirinomu	Rigo Central	Rigo		Info	
Yagabo Elementary School	Dirinomu	Dirinomu	Rigo Central	Rigo		Info	
Yule Island Elementary School	Yule Island	Chiria	Kairuku	Kairuku	Catholic	Info	
Yule Island Primary School	Yule Island	Chiria	Kairuku	Kairuku	Catholic	Info	Established 1886, formerly St Patrick's School
Zania Elementary School	Zania	Loloipa	Tapini	Goilala		Info	
Zhake Elementary School	Zhake	Zhake	Guari	Goilala		Info	

== Secondary and vocational schools ==
Name	Town/Village	Ward	LLG	District	Operator	Info	Notes
Paradise High School	NCD		East Boroko			Info	
Cape Rodney Vocational Centre	Otomata	Tutubu	Cloudy Bay	Abau		Info	
Ianu High School	Ianu	Ianu	Cloudy Bay	Abau		Info	
Iarowari High School	Sogeri	Sogeri Urban	Koiari	Kairuku		Info	Established 1962
Kemabolo Day High School	Kemabolo	Kemabolo	Rigo Coastal	Rigo		Info	Year 9 only
Kupiano Secondary School	Kupiano	Kupiano Urban	Aroma	Abau		Info	
Kwikila Secondary School	Kwikila	Kwikila Urban	Rigo Central	Rigo		Info	
Kwikila Vocational Centre	Kwikila	Kwikila Urban	Rigo Central	Rigo		Info	
Laloki High School	near Mesime	Mesime	Koiari	Kairuku		Info	
Mainohana Catholic High School	near Bereina	Abiara	Kairuku	Kairuku	Catholic	Info	Established 1958
Mount Diamond Adventist Secondary School	Mount Diamond	Mount Diamond	Hiri	Kairuku	Adventist	Info	
Redscar High School	Porebada	Porebada	Hiri	Kairuku	United	Info	
Sacred Heart High School	Tapini	Tapini Urban	Tapini	Goilala	Catholic	Info	
Sogeri National High School	Sogeri	Sogeri Urban	Koiari	Kairuku		Info	Established 1944. See
St Peter's Skills Training Institute	Yule Island	Chiria	Kairuku	Kairuku	Catholic	Info	

== See also ==
- Education in Papua New Guinea
- List of schools in Papua New Guinea
- List of schools in Port Moresby
