= Kairuku-Hiri District =

- Location within Papua New Guinea
- Coordinates: 9.055°S 147.036°E
- Country: Papua New Guinea
- Province: Central Province
- Capital: Bereina

Area
  - Total: 10,215 km^{2} (3,944 sq mi)

Population (2011 census)
  - Total: 121,586
  - Density: 11.903/km^{2} (30.828/sq mi)
- Time zone: UTC+10 (AEST)
- Website: www.kairukuhiri.gov.pg

Kairuku-Hiri District is a district of Central Province in Papua New Guinea. It is one of the four administrative districts that make up the province, and surrounds the national capital, Port Moresby.

Over half of the population of the Kairuku-Hiri district live in rural communities, and in many areas even basic services are lacking, and public infrastructure including roads, education, health and water supplies are in need of government attention.

Papua New Guinea's national government is working on two significant projects that are likely to commence in the Kairuku-Hiri district in the near future, being the Central City project at Bautama near Port Moresby, and the Liquefied Natural Gas (LNG) plant at Papa.

Some features of Kairuku-Hiri include the Hiri Moale Festival, the Kokoda Trail, Rouna Waterfall, Loloata Island Resort and the Mekeo Dancers.

== Local-level government areas ==
- Hiri Rural
- Kairuku Rural
- Koiari Rural
- Mekeo Kuni Rural

== Towns and major villages ==
- Abiara Oreke
- Adio
- Agevairu
- Aipeana
- Aivara
- Akufa
- Akuku
- Ameiaka
- Amoamo
- Apanaipi
- Ara'au
- Avai'i
- Babanongo
- Babiko
- Bakoiudu
- Barakau
- Baramata
- Bebeo
- Bereina
- Biotou
- Bodinumu
- Boera
- Bogi
- Boridi
- Brown River
- Delena
- Doe
- Eboa
- Edevu
- Efogi
- Engefa
- Ere'ere
- Gagaifua
- Gaire
- Goldie
- Gorohu
- Hereparu
- Hisiu
- Iesubaibua
- Ilimo Farm
- Imounga
- Inaoae
- Inaukina
- Inawabui
- Inawaia
- Inawauni
- Inawi
- Inika
- Ioi
- Itikinumu
- Kailaki
- Kareko Dobu
- Kagi
- Kerea
- Kerekadi
- Keveona
- Kido
- Kivori
- Kouderika
- Koupuana
- Kubuna
- Kuriva
- Laloki
- Lealea
- Lolorua
- Magabaira
- Maipa
- Manari
- Manumanu
- Mariboi
- Mava
- Mou
- Nabuapaka
- Nikura
- Ogotana
- Oriropetana
- Papa
- Pinu
- Pinupaka
- Piunga
- Porebada
- Poukama
- Rabuka
- Rapa
- Rarai
- Roku
- Rouna
- Seme
- Sogeri
- Tubu
- Tubusereia
- Ukaukana
- Vanuamai
- Veifa'a
- Veimauri
- Vesilogo
- Waima
- Yule Island

== See also ==
- Districts and LLGs of Papua New Guinea
