= Abau District =

- Location within Papua New Guinea
- Coordinates: 10.155°S 148.750°E
- Country: Papua New Guinea
- Province: Central Province
- Capital: Abau

Area
  - Total: 7,124 km^{2} (2,751 sq mi)

Population (2011 census)
  - Total: 55,569
  - Density: 7.800/km^{2} (20.20/sq mi)

Languages
  - Main languages: Daga, Mailuan
- Time zone: UTC+10 (AEST)

Abau District is a district of Central Province in Papua New Guinea. It is one of the four administrative districts that make up the province.

== Local-level government areas ==
- Amazon Bay Rural
- Aroma Rural
- Cloudy Bay Rural

== Towns and major villages ==
- Abau
- Amau
- Aroana
- Bailebo
- Bam
- Baramata
- Bomguina
- Borebo
- Boru
- Bukuku
- Cocoalands
- Darava
- Delebai
- Doma
- Domara
- Duramu
- Egala'auna
- Eunuoro Island
- Gaivakalana
- Ganai
- Gavuone
- Ianu
- Ilai
- Ilimorupu
- Iruone
- Kalapa
- Kapari
- Keagolo
- Kelekapana
- Kelerakwa
- Kupiano
- Kurere-Asiaro
- Lalaura
- Lako
- Laruoro Island
- Loupom Island
- Magarida
- Magaubo
- Magore
- Mailu Island
- Manabo
- Maopa
- Mogubo
- Moreguina
- Nunumai
- Paramana
- Pelagai
- Sabiribo
- Si'ini
- Tutubu
- Upulima
- Viriolo
- Vuru
- Waiori
- Wairavanua
- Wanigela
- Wapagai
- Waro
- Wouoro

== See also ==
- Abau language
- Districts and LLGs of Papua New Guinea
