= Boridi =

- Location within Papua New Guinea
- Coordinates: 9.0874°S 147.6378°E
- Country: Papua New Guinea
- Province: Central Province
- District: Kairuku-Hiri District
- LLG: Koiari Rural LLG
- Elevation: 5 m (16 ft)

Population (2000)
  - Total: 115

Languages
  - Main languages: English, Tok Pisin, Koiari
  - Traditional language: Koiari
- Time zone: UTC+10 (AEST)
- Location: 67 km (42 mi) NE of Port Moresby
- Climate: Cfb

Boridi is a village in the Owen Stanley Range in Central Province, Papua New Guinea.

Boridi is a Koiari village; the Koiaris are famous for serving as carriers for the Australian Army during WWII, along the Kokoda Track (Papua New Guineans from Kokoda and to the west were aligned with the Japanese). It is a mountainous area thick with forest.

Boridi is a remote village; not being along the Track, it misses out on the development that other track-side villages are experiencing with the increasing number of tourists. The nearest airstrip is in Milei, a 1-hour hike away for locals. There is no aid post (the nearest medical aid would be at Kagi or Efogi). There is a Seventh-day Adventist Church.

The village is set up around a large quadrangle which serves as a community sports field (soccer and volleyball are very popular); houses line the edge of the field. There are usually several buildings to a household: a kitchen, a building for sleeping, and usually a pitpit/drop toilet. Buildings are made out of bush materials; modern materials have not made their way up here yet, partly because they are expensive and the villagers have limited access to cash; and partly because the mountainous terrain makes it extremely difficult to transport large items.

The main cash crop is coffee. In previous years a coffee buyer from Port Moresby would charter a plane to Millea and locals would load it with bags of coffee beans, which would then be flown to Port Moresby to be sold. However, in 2006 there was no coffee buyer to fund the plane and so locals did not harvest the coffee. Recently rice has been introduced as another crop, but only a small amount is being grown at the moment. The community has a rice mill; what is harvested is used for food, or sold to people in nearby villages (there are no trade stores in the area; the nearest place to buy store goods is Port Moresby, two days and one night's hike away).

== Climate ==
Boridi has a subtropical highland climate (Köppen Cfb) with warm to very warm afternoons, pleasant mornings, and heavy rainfall year-round.

Climate data for Boridi
Month	Jan	Feb	Mar	Apr	May	Jun	Jul	Aug	Sep	Oct	Nov	Dec	Year
Mean daily maximum °C (°F)	25.9 (78.6)	25.8 (78.4)	25.1 (77.2)	24.4 (75.9)	23.8 (74.8)	22.6 (72.7)	22.0 (71.6)	22.3 (72.1)	23.4 (74.1)	24.7 (76.5)	25.4 (77.7)	25.8 (78.4)	24.3 (75.7)
Daily mean °C (°F)	20.3 (68.5)	20.2 (68.4)	19.8 (67.6)	19.3 (66.7)	19.0 (66.2)	18.1 (64.6)	17.5 (63.5)	17.8 (64.0)	18.4 (65.1)	19.2 (66.6)	19.5 (67.1)	20.0 (68.0)	19.1 (66.4)
Mean daily minimum °C (°F)	14.7 (58.5)	14.6 (58.3)	14.6 (58.3)	14.3 (57.7)	14.3 (57.7)	13.6 (56.5)	13.1 (55.6)	13.3 (55.9)	13.5 (56.3)	13.7 (56.7)	13.6 (56.5)	14.2 (57.6)	14.0 (57.1)
Average rainfall mm (inches)	376 (14.8)	343 (13.5)	354 (13.9)	255 (10.0)	191 (7.5)	94 (3.7)	90 (3.5)	113 (4.4)	181 (7.1)	225 (8.9)	225 (8.9)	304 (12.0)	2,751 (108.2)
Source: Climate-Data.org
