= Mailu Island =

- Location within Papua New Guinea
- Coordinates: 10.387°S 149.356°E
- Country: Papua New Guinea
- Province: Central Province
- District: Abau District
- LLG: Amazon Bay Rural LLG

Population (2000)
  - Total: 770

Languages
  - Main languages: Mailu language
- Time zone: UTC+10 (AEST)
- Location: 250 km (160 mi) ESE of Port Moresby

Mailu Island (sometimes known as the Toulon Island) is a small, 1.8 km (1.1 mi) long, island in Central Province, Papua New Guinea. It lies 250 km (160 mi) ESE from Port Moresby.

== Characteristics ==
Mailu is an island that has been inhabited since ancient times. It is located 8 km (5.0 mi) south of the New Guinean coast. Bananas, taro, yams, betel, sugarcane, as well as coconut, areca nut and sago palms grow on the island. The village is located on the NE shores. There is a smaller island right off Mailu's southern point. Pottery was made by the women on Mailu Island and traded with goods from the coast, mainly the South Cape and the Aroma people to the NW.

== History ==
First recorded sighting of Mailu island was by the Spanish expedition of Luís Vaez de Torres, that landed on it on 24 August 1606. It was charted as San Bartolomé. Spaniards reported that its inhabitants called it Ratiles. All the nearby land including the coast of New Guinea was called by the Spaniards Magna Margarita to honour the wife of the king of Spain at that time Philip III, Margaret of Austria. Still today the nearby coastal village of Magarida keeps this name.

This island was visited by Polish anthropologist Bronisław Malinowski in 1914. Mailu Island was also visited by Austrian anthropologist and photographer Hugo Bernatzik in 1932. Bernatzik, who published an ethnography a few years later, described Mailu as a very pleasant place and had a good impression of the Mailuans, as reliable people of a good character and skilled seafarers. He admired the buildings and the boats and took photographs of Mailu houses from the inside and outside. Bernatzik also took pictures of the islanders and their artifacts, reflecting a culture that he deemed was dying in contact with the modern world. Frank Hurley also visited Mailu during his journeys.

Between 1972 and 1974 New Zealand archaeologist Geoffrey Irwin carried out a survey of Mailu Island and the neighbouring coast where linguistically related groups, speakers of Mailuan languages, live.

== See also ==
- Mailuan languages
- Mailu language
