= Rigo District =

- Location within Papua New Guinea
- Coordinates: 9.781°S 147.840°E
- Country: Papua New Guinea
- Province: Central Province
- Capital: Kwikila

Area
  - Total: 5,072 km^{2} (1,958 sq mi)

Population (2011 census)
  - Total: 56,509
  - Density: 11.14/km^{2} (28.86/sq mi)

Languages
  - Main languages: Manubaran, Uare
- Time zone: UTC+10 (AEST)

Rigo District is a district of Central Province in Papua New Guinea. It is one of the five administrative districts that make up the province.

== Local-level government areas ==
- Rigo Central Rural
- Rigo Coastal Rural
- Rigo Inland Rural

== Towns and major villages ==
- Agitana
- Alepa
- Alewai
- Alukuni
- Babaga
- Babagarubu
- Babaka
- Bigairuka
- Bonanamo
- Borakagere
- Bore
- Boregaina
- Dakeva Komana
- Daroakomana
- Deugolo
- Diri Komana
- Dirigolo
- Dirinomu
- Dubana Teboa
- Gabagaba
- Gabone
- Galomarubu
- Gamoga
- Gaunomu
- Gemorubu
- Geresi
- Gidobada
- Ginigolo
- Girabu
- Goata
- Gobakigoro
- Gomore
- Goulubu

• Gulogolo

- Gunugau
- Gwaibo
- Hula
- Imairu
- Imuagoro
- Irupara
- Kalo
- Kamali
- Kaparoko
- Karai Komana
- Karawa
- Karekodobu
- Keapara
- Kemabolo
- Kemaea
- Kokorogolo
- Kore
- Kwale
- Kwalimurubu
- Kwikila
- Launakalana
- Lebagolo
- Magautou
- Makerupu
- Mamalo
- Manugoro
- Matairuka
- Niuiruka
- Nogomaka
- Riwalirubu
- Sabuia
- Sanomu
- Saroa
- Saroakeina
- Senunu
- Sivigolo
- Sivitatana
- Tagana
- Tauruba
- Vasira
- Vorakogena

== See also ==
- LLGs for Rigo East wards
