= Sogeri =

- Location within Papua New Guinea
- Coordinates: 9.4189°S 147.43375°E
- Country: Papua New Guinea
- Province: Central Province
- District: Sogeri Sub-District of Kairuku-Hiri District
- LLG: Koiari LLG

Government
  - LLG President: Hon. Ogi David
- Elevation: 500 m (1,600 ft)

Population (2000)
  - Total: 1,059

Languages
  - Main languages: English, Tok Pisin, Koiari and Motu.
  - Traditional language: Koiari
- Time zone: UTC+10 (AEST)
- Location: 46 km (29 mi) NE of Port Moresby
- Climate: Af

Sogeri town is the headquarters of the Sogeri Sub-District of the Kairuku-Hiri District in the Central Province of Papua New Guinea. It is located in the mountains eastward from Port Moresby and is situated in the Sogeri Plateau at about 500 metres or 1,600 feet above sea level. It is connected to Port Moresby by Sogeri Road.

The town is near the famous Kokoda Trail. Sogeri has a rural hospital, a police station, some stores and a supermarket. It also has a fruit and vegetable market. The town also has an Elementary School, a Primary School and two Secondary Schools. Sogeri is also home to a couple of parks, scenic sightseeing areas, picnic places, and rivers.

== Education ==
Sogeri is home to three secondary schools. Sogeri National High School, one of six state-run Schools of Excellence, which offer senior secondary studies for years 11–12 in Papua New Guinea. It was founded in 1944 by Australian troops. Iarowari Secondary School, a Years 9 to 12 school west of the main town established in 1962 and Laloki Secondary School which was a former Business Corporative College in the mid 60s to the mid 1970s, situated at the Lower Sogeri area, and offers grades 9 to 12 secondary education studies.

== Agriculture ==
Sogeri is home to the largest cattle ranch in the Pacific outside Australia and New Zealand, The Koitaki Cattle Ranch. Sogeri also has a hydroponic farm, that supplies a variety of veggies to major supermarkets and restaurants in Port Moresby and to the hotels in the area. Sogeri Spice, another Sogeri based agricultural company, has a pineapple plantation that supplies pineapples to markets in Port Moresby and also manufactures pineapple jams and other pineapple products. Moreover, the surrounding region grows a variety of vegetables, fruits and poultry. Sogeri also has small rubber plantations. The area receives significantly more rainfall than Port Moresby.

== Tourism ==
Sogeri enjoys a lot of visitations from Port Moresby residents and overseas trekkers because of its ideal location and its richness in Papua New Guinea's history.

The altitude at which Sogeri is situated, with its rainfall year-round makes Sogeri much cooler and greener than the city of Port Moresby.

Moreover, Sogeri is also home to picnic areas and parks, like the Crystal Rapids Picnic Area, Koitaki Country Club, Sirinumu Dam, Owers Corner, the Hombrum Bluff, Rouna Falls Lookout and the Varirata National Park.

Sogeri is also home to the entrance/exit of the Kokoda Trail.

The Varirata National Park is a natural rain-forest park, with a sealed drivethrough road to its lookout with a couple of walk tracks with directions. The park is home to its own natural flora and fauna and has a bird's eye-view lookout point of the city of Port Moresby and its outskirts. The park is a favourite for Bird Watchers.{{Citation needed}}

There are 5 Lodges or Hotels in the Sogeri area.

== Climate ==
Sogeri has a tropical rainforest climate (Köppen Af) with moderate rainfall from June to August and heavy rainfall in the remaining months.

Climate data for Sogeri
Month	Jan	Feb	Mar	Apr	May	Jun	Jul	Aug	Sep	Oct	Nov	Dec	Year
Mean daily maximum °C (°F)	30.5 (86.9)	30.2 (86.4)	29.9 (85.8)	29.3 (84.7)	28.7 (83.7)	27.7 (81.9)	27.3 (81.1)	27.4 (81.3)	28.4 (83.1)	29.6 (85.3)	30.3 (86.5)	30.6 (87.1)	29.2 (84.5)
Daily mean °C (°F)	25.4 (77.7)	25.2 (77.4)	25.1 (77.2)	24.7 (76.5)	24.3 (75.7)	23.5 (74.3)	23.0 (73.4)	23.1 (73.6)	23.9 (75.0)	24.6 (76.3)	24.9 (76.8)	25.4 (77.7)	24.4 (76.0)
Mean daily minimum °C (°F)	20.4 (68.7)	20.3 (68.5)	20.3 (68.5)	20.1 (68.2)	20.0 (68.0)	19.3 (66.7)	18.7 (65.7)	18.9 (66.0)	19.4 (66.9)	19.6 (67.3)	19.6 (67.3)	20.2 (68.4)	19.7 (67.5)
Average rainfall mm (inches)	273 (10.7)	297 (11.7)	295 (11.6)	256 (10.1)	201 (7.9)	119 (4.7)	74 (2.9)	110 (4.3)	184 (7.2)	186 (7.3)	197 (7.8)	246 (9.7)	2,438 (95.9)
Source: Climate-Data.org
