= Hula language =

Oceanic language spoken in Papua New Guinea

Hula
- Native to: Papua New Guinea
- Region: Central Province
- Native speakers: 5,000 (2014)
- Language family: Austronesian: Malayo-Polynesian; Oceanic; Western Oceanic; Papuan Tip; Central; Sinagoro–Keapara; Hula–Keapara; Hula

Language codes
- ISO 639-3: hul
- Glottolog: hula1239
- Coordinates: 10.096°S 147.726°E

Hula (or Vula’a, Bula’a, Vulaa) is an Oceanic language spoken in the Hula area of the Rigo district, in Papua New Guinea. It is close to, but distinct from, its neighbour Keapara.

== Dialects ==
The Hula language includes several dialectal varieties: Vulaa, Alewai, Irupara, Kaparoko, Viriolo, Moukele.
