= Kila Haoda =

Kila Haoda (born 21 September 1949) is a Papua New Guinean politician. He was the Governor of Central Province from 2012 to 2017.

Haoda was the human resources manager for New Britain Palm Oil Limited and operated a supermarket and liquor store in Kimbe before returning to his home province to build the successful March Girls Resort at Gaire. He was an unsuccessful candidate for Kairuku-Hiri District at the 2007 election. He contested the Central Provincial seat at the 2012 election and ousted Governor Alphonse Moroi; initially elected as an independent, he immediately joined the governing People's National Congress.

Haoda serves on the Appointments Permanent Committee and the Justice Referral Committee in the National Parliament, and also serves as chairman of the Central City Development Project Steering Committee. In August 2012, he questioned the benefits of the PNG Gas project for his province, expressing concern about insufficient infrastructure gains. He initially supported Powes Parkop's proposed "buai ban" in September 2013, but had come out strongly against it by February 2014. He complained of "undisciplined officers" that "continue to tarnish the name of our discipline force" after an incident where he claimed police enforcing the ban had "terrorised and humiliated" women and children.

Haoda initiated an education scheme in Central Province to assist students with school fees. In September 2014, he signed a memorandum of agreement to build a new satellite city on 300 hectares of farmland outside Port Moresby in conjunction with private developers. In the same month, he unveiled a new five-year development plan for the province, reported to be the first of its kind in Central Province. In 2014, he became the inaugural patron of the Central Province Premier Rugby Football League competition, which began to compete for the Kila Haoda Cup. In October 2014, he announced his opposition to the Trans-Island Highway project to connect Port Moresby with the rest of Papua New Guinea, citing the potential for social problems and conflict over land. In December 2014, he signed a memorandum of understanding with Eda Ranu for the Port Moresby water corporation to supply water to a number of villages in Central Province.

In July 2015, Haoda initiated a provincial microfinance scheme in conjunction with MiBank, in order to support small and medium enterprises and "to stop the free handout mentality". He also pledged to implement an "e-government" system in an ongoing partnership with the Malaysian government. In December 2015, he announced his opposition to a proposal for a new military base at Gabadi over land issues. He is recontesting his seat for the People's National Congress at the 2017 election.

He was defeated by Robert Agarobe at the 2017 election.

National Parliament of Papua New Guinea
Preceded by Alphonse Moroi	Governor of Central Province; 2012–2017	Succeeded by Robert Agarobe
