= Laco =

Laco or LACO may refer to:

- Laco (company), a Norwegian holding company
- Laco Uhrenmanufaktur, a German watch manufacturer
- Los Angeles Chamber Orchestra
- El Laco, a volcanic complex in the Antofagasta Region of Chile

== People ==
=== Surname ===
- Cornelius Laco (died 69 AD), prefect of the Roman imperial bodyguard
- Ján Laco (born 1981), Slovak ice hockey goaltender
- Pandi Laço (born 1964), Albanian journalist, songwriter, presenter, and scenarist
- Ted Laço (born 1995), Albanian footballer
- Teodor Laço (1936–2016), Albanian writer and diplomat

=== Given name ===
- Laco Déczi (born 1938), Slovak American jazz trumpeter and composer
- Laco Lučenič (born 1952), Slovak musician and music producer
- Laco Novomeský (1904–1976), Slovak poet, writer, and politician
- Laco Takács (born 1996), Czech footballer

== See also ==
- Lako, a surname and given name
