= Pinu =

Pinu may refer to:

== People ==
- Pinu Khan (born 1954), Bangladeshi politician

== Places ==
- Pinu, Papua New Guinea
- Pinu, Romania
- Ta' Pinu, Malta

== Other ==
- PINU or Innovation and Unity Party
