= Pinu, Papua New Guinea =

Abadi Pinu
- Location within Papua New Guinea
- Coordinates: 9.0510°S 146.8342°E
- Country: Papua New Guinea
- Province: Central Province
- District: Kairuku-Hiri District
- LLG: Kairuku Rural LLG

Population (2000)
  - Total: 1,250

Languages
  - Main languages: English, Tok Pisin, Abadi
  - Traditional language: Abadi
- Time zone: UTC+10 (AEST)
- Location: 64 km (40 mi) NW of Port Moresby; 58 km (36 mi) SE of Bereina
- Climate: Aw

Pinu village is geographically located on the coastline of Western Central Province, Papua New Guinea. It is about 60 km north west of Port Moresby, and is accessible by Hiritano highway from the city of Port Moresby. This village is also surrounded by a number of smaller Gabadi language speaking villages.

These villages used dugout canoes with sails to travel to and from Port Moresby up until the 1970s, when Hiritano Highway was built. This 300 kilometres highway was the first to be built by the government, connecting Port Moresby and Gulf Province capital, Kerema town.

Pinu village coordinates are 9.0501' S, 146.8353'E between Aroa River towards the North East, the Gallery Reach, on the East, and Iovi beach towards the Southwest. Ironically, it is strategically positioned in the middle of rivers, a stretch of beach, swamps and abundant flat land.

The area has great potential given it is one of the largest area of flat land in Central Province especially in Kairuku area. There are at least two rivers on both sides; the Aroa river and Galley Reach river both running from inland and pouring itself on the sea at Toutu and Manumanu respectively. The commercial interests in the area date back to the mid 1800s, with Australian business interest for sugar cane farming. Today, rubber estates have been exported from Doa plantation for some time. The beach front has much potential as a tourist attraction due to its proximity to Port Moresby by boat attracting holiday makers and fishing enthusiasts to the galley reach and kekeni rocks for fishing and other interest as well.

Pinu village falls under the political jurisdiction of Kairuku Hiri District with its district headquarters at Bereina. The political representation is under Kairuku Rural consisting of 17 Local Level Government (LLG) councils, represented by their respective elected councillors. The 17 LLGs elect a Council president who represents them in the Provincial Assembly. The provincial Assembly is responsible for ensuring services such as infrastructure in the form of roads, bridges, schools, health centres are established and maintained each year. The Provincial Assembly is chaired by the Provincial Governor, unless otherwise the incumbent holds a portfolio in the National Parliament, the chair position is voted for within the provincial assembly.

Pinu village has an elementary school and community school together covering Elementary Prep to Grade 8. The school is part of government school system that was originally a church school establish by the United Church in early 1960s. This is important to highlight because the United Church has its origins in London Missionary Society, and it had previously started this vernacular education system; which was British schooling system, however, in 1902, Australia when it annexed Papua, and the Australian system was implemented until, the Government took full control of it after independence in 1975.

By then it had already produce students that were attending Della Salle High School and Iarowari High School for the male students and Our ladies of Sacred Heart (OLSH) High School, and Marinville High School for the female students. There were also a few students that were attending Sogeri and Kerevat National High School, and many of them have gone on to tertiary institutions and other technical colleges.

The elite group of Pinu people today hold senior positions both in the Public Service, and the private sector. Most of them today enjoy the privileges of their own success; living and working in the city of Port Moresby and elsewhere, and in turn, enlist their own children in private schools and government schools in the urban areas. Most of them have also contributed significantly to the development of this country in their respective duties, and also given their share of resources to Pinu Village.

Other services include the health service which is run by a medical orderly, and treat patients from the village and the nearby villages. There is no proper water supply, and the villagers draw water from the wells, and catch rain water for drinking, cooking and laundry. A river tributary flows close to the village and it is used for bathing and laundry.

It is also well documented that the road system to the village is in atrocious condition, and is inaccessible during rainy seasons. Pinu people, including Manumanu and Toutu are disadvantaged during the wet periods, and have to walk long hours to get to the main highway, or use sea transport to access Port Moresby for goods and services.

Kabadi, was blessed with extended land mass provide wild game supply of wallabies and wild pigs, and the water ways, provide seasonal fishing yields of fish, crabs, prawns, and shellfish. This food source continues to be plentiful for the people.

The surplus is usually sold in the city markets for goods such as sugar, tea, rice, flour, and other staples. There is no cash crop, but informal sales of coconut, betel nut, and other tree species such as eaglewood.

Pinu village was previously mentioned in historical writings as one of the oldest settlement and was previously named Vanuapaka in the Kabadi area. Early explorers and missionaries arrived on the shores around the mid 1800s and immediately built churches and schools, this was the commencement of colonisation by the British and then Australia thereafter. Historical literature (C. G. Seligman) records the name Vanuapaka, a village that trades regularly with the motuans; The British explorers especially anthropologists and Missionaries, used this name due to its large population and size. There were other names used such as Ma’i Vanua, which belong to paramount chiefs Aro Ure and Ure Vado. Moreso, and interestingly, literature records these people as the original settlers and owners of all the land in Kabadi, the Pinu people are referred to as Kabadi or Abadi Pinu.

The common name generally used "Abadi Pinu." The word "Abadi" refers to power, ownership, and prestige by the paramount chief, while "Kabadi" refers to communal ownership or origin. The word Abadi literally means I own, and it is synonymous with the paramount chief.

Pinu was recently coined name. In some circles of discussions, many have suggested that this name came into being after the introduction of schools and other necessary administrative support from the British Empire.

The colonial administrators decided that the productive approach to managing this savages was to coerce the powerful and influential individuals. The administration, had a plan, to influence the Paramount chief, offer compensation; using the early LMS pastors from Pacific islands who had by then spoke the Kabadi language to push this agenda. They proposed that chiefs accept the colonial administration and it is believed that they battered with the chiefs to coerced them. And an important aspect of this new authority was to usurp control by forcing small hamlets to come together to form bigger villages, to benefit from colonial administration services such as schools and other necessary services.

Therefore, Pinu village was formed and many villages were somewhat forced to move and build houses close to and around the chiefs village. This is understood to be around the 1890s.

Nearby villages such as Ukaukana, Kave ona, Kou ' puana, and Matepaela have very close ties to Pinu, having broken away, intermarriage from Pinu. Therefore, they are also referred to as Kabadi.

The word 'Kabadi' was used constantly by early European patrols. Some also recorded it as 'Kabatsi,' closely associating it to the Roro-speaking people. Over time, pronunciation of the word transformed gradually to Gabadi and was reinforced and used by Motuan interpreters who accompanied the colonial administrators in the 1890s.

== Language ==
The local dialect spoken by the Kabadi people is called Abadi. Walter Mersh Strong wrote that the "Kabadi language is spoken in the villages of Vanuapaka, Ukaukana, Kapuana, Keviona, and Matapaile." It is still spoken in these villages today with minor changes in the adoption of pidgin and English words. The Summer Institute of Linguistics (SIL) has embarked on a project with the people of Kabadi to translate the Bible in the Kabadi language, for the purpose of language preservation.

== History ==
=== The journey of the Kabadi tribes ===
From the outset, it is necessary for accountability in the management of information and how it is justified for the contemporary reader. Unfortunately, oral history over time can be subjected to interpretations of different perspectives, and for varying reasons. Therefore, oral history and its authenticity is measured at minimum by its correlation to that of a nearby tribal village stories, customs and traditions, and myths. For example, the name of a Kabadi chief must be verifiable by the Lala or Waima, Doura or Mekeo tribe. Additionally, an oral account must be proven against documents such as anthropological writings, newspaper articles, and transactions such as land sales which may prove names of individuals and events depicting activities that even today can be traced and accounted for against oral history.

According to historical accounts, and conversations surrounding the various Kabadi tribes that co-exist today, and it is also logical to deduce that respective tribes have their accounts of migrational routes, yet all these tribes have a common destination. While, they had different routes, several walked the inner mountains, others along the coast line.

The other common character is the point of origin, where the Kabadis descended from Mt Yule (Kovio). This is confirmed by their previous settlements along the way, including land that they had settled briefly, buried their dead, planted food gardens. Along the arid plains and mountains of Pokao (Lala), tracking the banks of Dilava river and finally settling in various locations on the flat lands of what is called 'Gabadi' today. This is verified by folk songs and stories retracing their paths to Pokao, Meke'o, and Roro land. It is true, that the Kabadi's still have old sago trees growing in ancient villages where they settled briefly. The people in those areas still speak of land previously settled by the Kabadis. There were no inhabitants or civilization when the Kabadi's arrived. They settled in different locations on this land; they progressively advanced at different times and locations strategically for purposes of defense or claiming of land. It was not until a couple of hundred years later, approximately between the late 1700s and early 1800s, that interaction with the Koitabus and Motus, when differences emerged.

The Kabadi’s have a close connection to Lala tribes; most of which have survived till today; the villages are Vanuamai, Oroi, Alaska, Diumana, Dubu (Tubu) Kaiau(Bokama), Lalime, Abo, and Epa.

Early writings by the Explorers, missionaries and anthropologist such as G Seligman, James Chalmers, J F Barton, Strong W Mersh, to name a few, captured events with their visitations around this period especially in the 1890s. Hence, it is fair that the migration of the various tribes would be earlier.

Another notable event was a war between the Elemas and Kabadis, when a Roro man murdered an Elema man, and the murderer tracked his way to the paramount chief's doorstep. Consequently, battle and chaos ensured with horrific atrocities perpetrated by all parties.

There is another story of a man,‘ Abau Kama’ who was enemies with the Kabadi’s, a descendent of Geita Hari, and the line of Ova Geita. His maternal line of Navu Kave, Hedu Navu, Rohi Hedu, Abau Rohi. Abau Kama led men to fight the Kabadis at the mouth of the Toutu river. Both sides fought with losses of up to 100 men on both sides.

Abau returned home to Vauria, on the Hill in Nara, after the battle. Even then, the Kabadi’s return and fighting continued between the two sides until Abau’s village was decimated by an epidemic that scattered his people along Manumanu to the Koitabu and Motuan villages new Port Moresby. Abau Kama or Abau Rohi, came to Hohodae and lived with Ganaga Abau, who was the headman of Dubara iduhu.

There is a lot more commonality amongst the western central people. Dr. W. Mersh Strong observed in this writtings depicting events and lives of the Roro- and Mekeo-speaking people, which have much resemblance to the Kabadi people. The writings further confirm these group of people came through Mt. Yule or Kovio. There were waves of migration of different groups of people including the Roros, the Mekeos, the Nara, the Kabadis and finally the Touras who have progressed further east towards present-day city of Port Moresby. This can also be proven through language, lifestyle and traditions of these different groups of people. For example, traditional headdresses, grass skirts, paintings are quite similar except each group differs in slight variation in face paint colors or grass skirt colors. Moreover, languages spoken demonstrate similar traits of sounds vowels and accent between the groups and can be easily understood. This basically demonstrate a coordinated movement of the same group; but at different points in time between one or perhaps two centuries. Evidence of these events are held in oral history and songs composed and passed on from generation to generations and are tightly guarded by the custodians.

The Kabadis settled and lived in small but robust settlements strategically positioned to protect each other from invaders. The Kabadis had endured a warfare had enmity with the Koitabus and Motuans. They also battled an Erema tribe during the post-migration period. Missionary James Chalmers reported that the Kabadi were friendly with the Doura but "at bitter enmity" with the Koitabu, giving the following story as the reason: the Kabadi had attacked Lealea, a village in Caution Bay, in revenge for murder, killing several Koitabuans; in response, the Lealeans and Koitabuans attacked the village of Matapaila, killing most of the inhabitants. However, survivors of that attack managed to rally fighters quickly from nearby villages, who in turn attacked and killed the Leleans and Koitabuans who had been celebrating their victory at Matapaila.

The Kabadi people through oral history recorded and passed on by folk songs depicting tribal wars; a Koitabu warlord surrounding Mataebaile with his warriors, and attacking the village. Historical accounts have it that Kere from Vanuamago, while visiting his concubine sensed the danger and raced all the way to Vanuapaka; gathered reinforcement, return, and the Kabadis surrounded them and murdered all of them, presented the 'price kill' to the paramount chief. The location upon which the battle took place was called Eke'ekena, a splinter tribe of Ivei. Today, the Eke'ekena people lay claim to this location which was renamed after the battle, and today it is called 'Amadi'. The Abadis withstood on-going wars for over two centuries and today stand proud to stake claim to the land they invaded, conquered and live to tell the tale. Oral citations of warriors like 'Boi Pipi' and numerous others are testament to this claim. "Tamate" also stated in his writings about the Kabadis constant war thus, saw the urgent need for peace.

Oral history states seven tribes migrated together and eventually settled on the Kabadi land. The seven tribes had their respective chiefs who were tasked with specific roles. These are head warriors, magicians or sorcerers, messengers, and interpreters. To this day, there are still seven tribes with seven clan chiefs. During the arrival of the colonisers, government officials who visited the Abadi plains encouraged people to move and settled together in villages. This was to ensure the Crown accounted for everyone, and to ensure much-needed services can be provided to them. The early patrol officers that visited the villages on the Gabadi plain named the villages 'Vanuapaka' which literally means 'big village', due to it been the political and administrative center, while there were satellite villages such as Ukaukana, keveona, Matepaila villages - according Seligman who wrote in his book The Melanesians of British New Guinea 'the three best known villages of Kabadi Vanuapaka, kopuana and Ukaukana'. p. 27 subnotes. Even so, other settlements continued to exist around the Abadi plains which grew with families and clans moving to strategic locations for easy access to food, and also protect the lands acquired by the Chief. The main tribe called 'Vanuapaka' governed by a powerful chief called Aro Ure Aba moura (I), all the other tribes functioned around the sovereignty of the chief, he issued instructions and was the ultimate law. He personally named and put in place clan leaders, and his word was law.

The seven tribes still exist today, but are grouped into three major clans under Pinu village. Today, while there is strong resistance by some of the tribe to these realities, the literature affirms some of these facts, such ownership of land. The 'Queenslander' article dated 27 October 1883 and archived in the National Library of Australia highlights an event led by William Lawes and James Chalmers and Government officials to investigate a land sale dubbed the Pretended Land Sale in New Guinea, page 693(3) states clearly Ure Vado as the rightful owner of land, reiterating that Paramount chiefs ownership of all the land.

== Chief system ==
The Chief system of Kabadi is part of its identity. The Kabadis exist together with this authority since their origin. Both oral history and documents indicate line of Chiefs dating back beyond the arrival of the white man and churches. Estimations indicate generations dating back three centuries or more and can be justified by the achievement of the Chiefs and how they conduct themselves. The historical records of the chiefs activities date back to the 1800s during the first contacts with the outside world. It does place a burden on the accuracy and the necessity to be precise; this is difficult given it is oral history. However, it does make sense to identify old sites, burial grounds, by counter claims to other villages along the migration routes.

This in itself demonstrates a system of power, primitive but effective system of governance which has now borne fruits of success generations later. One example is the use of this system by the colonial government to coerce the Kabadis into accepting the government and the early churches by using the chief system. The early penetration by British and Australian government officer's were made possible by the chief through interpreters and the chief's 'remo'.

The Chief system of Kabadi people has strong resemblance to the Mekeo, Roro and Nara people. This form of government system is tyrannical in nature, yet had a unique form of administration, with barao or roe for meetings to convene, a policing network that maintained order and peace. Oral history links the Vanuapaka tribe to Kivori and Waima tribes, with family ties still in existence. While this system was basic, it had maintained a well balance power base that kept the tribe together from its migration period between the 1400s and 1600s. During the period of settlement in the 1700s and 1800s, the system somewhat integrated the feudal style power also, with the chief granting lease of land to individuals or families who have made significant contributions to the tribe particular in bravery in warfare, and in participation in conquer of land, or through marriages to the chief family. The ownership of land is centred with the paramount chief, as evident in all documents relating to lease of land in the mid and late 1800s in the Abadi plains, notably the Galley Reach, Camp 48, Rogers Airstrip.

=== Aro Ure and Ure Vado ===
The chiefs held two names which represents power, wealth, and prestige namely 'Aro Ure I' and 'Ure Ure I'. Two chief brothers were featured prominently in the history of Abadis; The elder Aro Ure was the Paramount Chief, while his younger sibling was a fierce warrior. Both chiefs where the offspring's of the migrating chief call Aro Maino.

The chief line is still been maintained today with the paramount chief and his clan chiefs. The clan chiefs also maintain their 'Barao's or verandah's as a symbol of authority.

It is believed that during the migration period, both Chiefs led the Kabadi's and their men and women to the present locations. Fierce encounters with the Motuan and the Koitabuans resulted in a period of hostility that would have last over two centuries or so; before the period of the London Missionary Society (LMS) in the late 1800s. There were sporadic attacks in revenge by the Kabadis to the east against the Lealeas and Boeras, even Manumanu who had previously settled on the other side of the mouth of galley reach river then. Their raids on the Motuans and the Koitabus further beyond the Abadi plains to capture hunting, fishing, and gardening grounds in the Galley Reach areas and beyond. Legends and folk songs still depict scenes and battle fields of these encounters even in locations as far as Lealea village. This particular detail is important as it states facts about a place and event that occurred then and was named 'kabadi gabugabu'.

The Kabadi history bears the hallmark of Ure Ure (Vado Kepo) who had wielded his authority during mid to late 1800s. This was the period of the commencement of peace, and this chief was credited for receiving the white man and churches into the Abadi area. Ure Vado was the younger brother of Aro Ure and had assumed his brother's leadership upon the latter's death. Aro Ure I had a son but was much younger to rule, and as such; Ure Vado assume the title of the chief and commenced his rule. Charmers wrote with interest of the willingness of Paramount chief Ure Vado to end all enmities and open up new trade with the people of the east and west also. Because of his honorable deeds; it is believed that Ure Vado was ordained as a deacon of the early LMS church. Similarly, his successor - Chief Aro Ure (Aba Mokuro), son of his elder brother continued this roll as soon as he assumed chieftainship after the death of Ure Vado.

The Kabadi chieftaincy system is patrimonial and only the blood male heir can assume the position of paramount chief. This system is particularly similar is most villages in the west of central province. There is only one instance recorded in literature and spoken of a female chief 'Queen Koloka' inherited the title from her father Naime. But, all Roro and Mekeo villages have male chiefs and this law is particularly upheld. In Kabadi, it is no exception, with much emphasis given to preparation and grooming of the chiefs at a very young age. In oral history, chieftaincy is passed between two brothers in Aro Ure and Ure vado, and cannot be passed onto female siblings, or even bring someone from another tribe in fear of distorting the blood line.

History has it that the original Aro Ure had courted the Nara Chief's daughter by the name Koroka. It is this relationship that brought the Nara child to Kave’ona.

Naime was given custodian ownership of the land. However, this would become a controversy later on with the sale of a portion of land to Messers Cameron and Goldie. UreVado disputed this land transaction which was then annulled by the Australian administration.

A notable chief mentioned in literature is called Naime Eru. J. W. Lindt Picturesque New Guinea, 1887, page 17. This event was captured in writing when Sir Peter Scratchley visited Kabadi in 1885, Lindt, described the setting; ..after dinner, Ure Vado, the head chief of Kabadi was introduced, attired European fashion, in an old Crimean shirt with a strong beads round his neck. Naime Eru sat beside him, and a palaver had commenced; Mr. Chalmers translating for the High Commissioner’s benefit the chiefs opinion of Cameron’s land transaction. The discussion was centered around Cameron transacting an illegal land deal, that ‘this was to the effect that legal consent to the transfer had never been given, and that Mr. Cameron had deal with the wrong people.

=== Early Church ===
Ure Vado II with the aid of the early colonial government, and the LMS; saw the urgency to develop a policy of peaceful engagement, which was then encouraged by the LMS. James Chalmers saw this as an opportunity to bring peace in the area and end the barbaric culture of ethnic killing. Chief Ure Vado's notable contribution was organising the peace between the Kabadi's and the Motuan's and Koitabu's in 1880s. James Chalmers noted: "Ure Vado came in about 8 o'clock. It was interesting to watch the meeting between the Lealeans and him. They rubbed noses and threw their arms around one another, and each expressed great pleasure at this meeting. Ure Vado said, "You have never been here before because of our fathers. Enough, let their enmity now die, and here is Kabadi before you to buy yams, bananas, and sugar-cane, whenever you like to come." The others replied "Tis because of these, God's men, we are enabling thus to meet: and we shall certainly come here in future for food. Often have we seen the laden canoes of the Boeras and Motuans pass our doors from here and wished we, too, could only secure some, but now we shall be as they are." This event was of such significance as it ushered in a new era of civilized co-existence with neighboring motuans and Koitabuans who would then become trade partners, bringing knowledge and extended network of relationship.

Another documented event during this period was to do with a land grab by a Scotsman, Andrew Goldie, who had acted on behalf of a Sydney-based syndicate to acquire land in Kabadi under very suspicious circumstances; Goldie and John Cameron "prepared a document drawn in legal phraseology— a land transfer— which they had brought up to the Mission House for translation," and "Armed with this deed, and taking with them a certain amount of 'trade'— as articles such as hardware, cloth, and tobacco are called in the South Seas — they departed. They found a man in occupation of the land they coveted, and generously offered him articles to the value of about £65, which amount would represent about one penny per acre of 15,000. This arrangement suited the wily Papuan in the highest degree, as it subsequently turned out that he was only a tenant under the chief, Ure Vado. On learning this Messrs. Cameron and Goldie returned to Kabadi, taking with them more trade, interviewed the chief, and made terms with him, eventually paying him also an additional penny per acre in articles to the total amount, and taking a further 5,000 acres as a kind of reward." This event reverberated through the papers for some time.

== Arrival of the churches ==
It must be stated that the Kabadi people and the rest of Central Province owe it to the missionaries who had come ashore in the late 1800s, and this was the commencement of modernisation of their society. While there is some discontentment that many cultural traditions and practices have been lost due to this foreign influence, it is a subject of another discussion.

The church had played a significant role in transforming the lives of the people. The London Missionary Society, landed in the area, and established stations, where the church and schools were built. The role and influence of the church then was made much easier with the approval of the Paramount chief, who then welcomed the early church to establish themselves in Pinu village. A church building was established with a school built to teach the people about God and basic English and maths. Everyone was forced to embrace this change, which subsequently led to people converting and accepting Christianity.

London Missionary Society (LMS)

Rev. James Chalmers. James Charmers was born in 1841 in Scotland. Rev. James worked for the London Missionary Society and came to the south seas in 1868 and worked in Rarotonga and subsequently New Guinea where he lost his life in 1901.

Rev. James Charmers was responsible for the establishment and extension of the church through LMS in the Papuan area during the British rule of the New Guinea.

Rev. Timoteo. Timoteo was the first Samoan sent to New Guinea as a missionary in 1883. He was initially posted to a village called Kabadi on the Papuan coast. Timoteo was highly regarded for his ability to learn the local languages as he achieved his fluency in the motu and Kabadi languages, allowing him to preach and translate parts of the Bible. His ability assisted government officers such as teachers and medical staff to communicate effectively with the local people.

Rev. Timoteo served for seven years in Vanuapaka before returning for furlough in Samoa in 1890. He returned and served another seven years. He returned and did other duties, however, Timoteo returned to Kabadi, served some more years and died in Vanuapaka in 1899, and was buried in his beloved village of Vanuapaka.

Rev. Piri.

The church had become a new way of life as schools were built and health services were established. A church school (vernacular school) was established in Vanuapaka village. More men and young people were educated and sent away to go for schooling. Most traditional and customary beliefs have now given way to modern lifestyles with the establishment of government schools, with a wave of young people graduating and moving away to other provinces for education or work and bring back a change of thought pattern. A permanent church building was subsequently built in the 1960s which still stands where the old church and school were built, and today the area is called the station.

There are two churches that are active, namely, the United Church, which is the foundation church, and more recently, the Christian Revival Church (CRC), a mainstream church. Both churches have significantly contributed to the spiritual upkeep of the village people, and also maintain their respective church buildings which are used for Sunday worships and weekly gatherings.

== Government services ==
Pinu village falls under the political jurisdiction of Kairuku Hiri District with its district headquarters at Bereina. The political representation is under Kairuku Rural consisting of 17 Local Level Government (LLG) councils, represented by their respective elected councillors. The 17 LLGs elect a Council president who represents them in the Provincial Assembly. The provincial Assembly is responsible for ensuring services such as infrastructure in the form of roads, bridges, schools, health centres are established and maintained each year. The Provincial Assembly is chaired by the Provincial Governor, unless otherwise the incumbent holds a portfolio in the National Parliament, the chair position is voted for within the provincial assembly.

Pinu village has an elementary school and community school together covering Elementary Prep to Grade 8. The school is part of government school system that was originally a church school establish by London Missionary Society in early 1960s. The Government took full control of it after independence in 1975. By then it had already produce students that were attending Della Salle High School and Iarowari High School for the male students and Our ladies of Sacred Heart (OLSH) High School, and Marinville High School for the female students. There were also a few students that were attending Sogeri and Kerevat National High School, and many of them have gone on to tertiary institutions and other technical colleges.

The elite group of Pinu people today hold senior positions both in the Public Service, and the private sector. Most of them today enjoy the privileges of their own success; living and working in the city of Port Moresby and elsewhere, and in turn, enlist their own children in private schools and government schools in the urban areas. Most of them have also contributed significantly to the development of this country in their respective duties, and also given their share of resources to Pinu Village.

Other services include the health service which is run by a medical orderly, and treat patients from the village and the nearby villages. There is no proper water supply, and the villagers draw water from the wells, and catch rain water for drinking, cooking and laundry. A river tributary flows close to the village and it is used for bathing and laundry.

It is also well documented that the road system to the village is in atrocious condition, and is inaccessible during rainy seasons. Pinu people, including Manumanu and Toutu are disadvantaged during the wet periods, and have to walk long hours to get to the main highway, or use sea transport to access Port Moresby for goods and services.

== Projects ==
In the early 1980s, a project was initiated between the people of Pinu and Ilimo Farm to farm Sorghum. This project got off the ground and was managed by the Incorporated Land Owner group called Abadi Business Group. The business group was managed by locals the project was a success up until the Ilimo Farm ceased operations, and this caused the business to restrategise to sustain itself. despite many attempts to progress their business plans, the land owner group eventually ceased operations. It is believed small amounts of funds invested with commercial banks still earn a minimum interest and it is yet to be claimed. The Abadi Business group has since been deregistered by Investment Promotion Authority.

in the 1990s, the European Union through its Aid agency, built a solar operated pump system to pump water from underground water system to supply the village. Each clan was supplied with four thanks with taps to be accessed by each homes, however, this system has since ceased, with all tanks rusted and destroyed. This has somewhat put a huge burden on the women folk who have now resorted to fetching water from wells, which are sometimes unhealthy due to proximity of hole toilets.

In 2010, a group was formed by people from Pinu, Manumanu and Toutu villages to basically seek to improve the roads leading to their respective villages. The people had faced hardship, as at times they would be cut off from accessing utilities and services in the city. The group somewhat achieve their purpose merely as a pressure group, pushing the local member of Parliament Hon. Paru Aihi to improve the road. The Governor made possible some funds which were given and expedited for the project. However, this upgrade was short-lived the following year when the wet season reverted the condition of the road to its initial state. On 10 May 2012, two separate print media reported the elected member of Parliament, Hon. Paru Aihi, making a pledge of five million kina to the Pinu people from the LNG developer as part of its responsibility for the 'gas pipeline corridor' who will be affected by the pipeline. The funding was channeled through the provincial government, and will be drawn and paid to the contractor to build a proper all-weather road from the main highway all the way to Manumanu, including the Toutu road. Unfortunately, this project has not taken off, with the funds yet to be received, or has been diverted to other projects.

There were talks in 2012 about a rice project to be initiated by a Naima group, and endorsed by relevant authorities to farm rice on the Abadi plains. Meetings were organised by the stakeholders and the landowners; however, according to the Abadis, it is crucial to recognise the authority to the land itself first. While the rice project has pushed for Incorporate Land Groups to be formed, Abadi Pinu must chair, let alone be lead negotiators in, any project to be introduced and implemented on the Abadi plains because, historically, Chiefs Aro Ure and Ure Vado have been documented as signatories to all previous land mobilisation programs. The Abadis have also incorporated an ILG with the Lands Department in anticipation of any future projects in the Abadi plains.

== Additional information ==
In the mid-1800s, a portion of land was sold by a custodian called Naime Arua near Kabadi, to a syndicate. Two names were prominent; Cameron and Goldie, while, texts in archives show that both were acting on behalf of a Sydney syndicate. Goldie had previously decided to settle in New Guinea. In May 1878 he had bought land near Hanuabada and set up a trading store. In September 1883 he joined J. B. Cameron, agent of a Sydney syndicate, in buying 17,000 acres (6880 ha) at Kabadi. This purchase defied native custom and poisoned his good relations with William Lawes. On the establishment of the protectorate Goldie and Cameron sought recognition of the transaction and parted company when it was refused. In 1886 the government decided to remove European settlement from the Hanuabada area. In exchange for his property Goldie was offered six blocks in the new township at Granville West but after a vigorous paper war with Anthony Musgrave was compensated with £400 for his improvements, and given fifty suburban acres (20 ha) and three town allotments on which he built Port Moresby's first store in January 1887. Despite a report of his death in 1886 Goldie visited Sydney in 1891 but died soon after his return to Port Moresby on 20 November. Although evidence on his estate was destroyed in World War II, he left 3750 shares in Burns Philp & Co. Ltd to three sisters and two brothers.

The archives further showed that the paramount chief of Kabadi disputed the land deal. His argument was on the fact that the said culprit; Naime Arua was never the owner, but a custodian. A public court was initiated where Naime Arua admitted to not owning the land and it was Paramount Chief of Kabadi Ure Vado that owned all the land.

In the course of all of these events, missionary James Chalmers protested to the British Empire by formally writing a letter through the Queensland and New Zealand court system. Moreover, Governor Scratchley had taken a personal interest in the land saga and had done his own investigations with documented facts presented to the authorities. The Governor also presented the case to the Crown; citing the land transactions illegal. His writings have also indicated the true land owner was Ure Vado and his nephew, Aro Ure.

The administration was up and running by the early 1900s, and by 1908, an important occasion took place which a signing ceremony between the landowners and the Crown, effectively transferring ownership of the Galley Reach area to the Crown or State for a 99 years lease.

The Department of Lands and Physical Planning issued a 'Notice To Treat' through the provincial lands authority as soon as the 99-year lease had expired. The Abadi Pinu Land Group Incorporation (ILG) Chairman and his executive then submitted in response to this notice. Under the Lands Act 1996, Section 12 subsection (2) the ILG notes gross abuse of process by the State agent, as provisions that protect the rights of the indigenous owners was not adhered to with the Abadi Pinu ILG not receiving the response in the given time. Even, subsection (5) calls for compensation, which did not eventuate. More recently, towards the end of 2015, the department issued notices of compulsory acquisitions of portion 406, 421,422,423,424, and further acquisitions in January 2016 for renewal of Agricultural Leases under section 120 (2) portion 149, 150, 151, 154, 185, 189,142, 196,148, 195, 134, all of which are under Milinch Manu, Fourmil Aroa, Central Province. Tragically, The real owners, the Abadi Pinu, Kabadi people have not benefited at all. The Companies listed are British New Guinea Development Limited, Kanosia Estates Limited, and Veimauri Plantations Ltd, and there is an urgent need to verify and cross-check all the record and whether due process was adhered to by the agent of the State.

This document and various other lease-related documents prove beyond doubt the ownership of the land area of Abadi, and the authority that existed and was recognised then. To this day, the social structure and authority still exist today, and has stood the change of times, a testament to the people of Abadi-Pinu.

'Manumanu Land 2015–2016.'

In late 2015, the Government of Papua New Guinea though its various agencies had instituted and acted through the Defense Policy to identify land in the Kabadi Area to build infrastructure for the Papua New Guinea Defense Force. The corresponding actions led to the department of Lands and Physical Planning issuing Gazzetal Notices in late December 2015 of compulsory acquisition of land in Kabadi. Ironically, this land is linked to the actual land deal transacted by Cameron and Goldie in 1883.
