= Goilala District =

- Location within Papua New Guinea
- Coordinates: 8.359°S 147.031°E
- Country: Papua New Guinea
- Province: Central Province
- Capital: Tapini

Area
  - Total: 7,587 km^{2} (2,929 sq mi)

Population (2011 census)
  - Total: 36,092
  - Density: 4.757/km^{2} (12.32/sq mi)

Languages
  - Main languages: Goilalan (Fuyuge, Tauade, Kunimaipa)
- Time zone: UTC+10 (AEST)
- Website: www.goilala.com

Goilala District is a district of Central Province in Papua New Guinea. It is one of the four administrative districts that make up the province.

== Local-level government areas ==
- Guari Rural
- Tapini Rural
- Woitape Rural

== Towns and major villages ==
- Aduai
- Aikora
- Avele
- Enaugagave
- Evese
- Fane
- Garima
- Gorowaku
- Henende
- Iguai
- Ilide
- Kambise
- Kase
- Kaugeri
- Kileipi
- Kodige
- Koefa
- Koilapo
- Kone
- Kosipe
- Loleava
- Mariboi
- Miku
- Mondo
- Omuitu
- Ononge
- Oro
- Rupila
- Songaku
- Sopu
- Sumbi
- Tapini
- Tatupiti
- Taveve
- Tawuni
- Tokio
- Torula
- Uruna
- Visi
- Woitape
- Yeme
- Yongai
- Yoribai
- Yulai
- Zania
- Zhake

== See also ==
- Districts and LLGs of Papua New Guinea
