= Hisiu =

Hisiu Vihiu, Bihiu
- Location within Papua New Guinea
- Coordinates: 9.04834°S 146.77432°E
- Country: Papua New Guinea
- Province: Central Province
- District: Kairuku-Hiri District
- LLG: Kairuku Rural LLG

Population (2000)
  - Total: 1,503

Languages
  - Main languages: English, Tok Pisin, Waima/Roro/Paitana
  - Traditional language: Waima
- Time zone: UTC+10 (AEST)
- Location: 108 km (67 mi) NW of Port Moresby
- Climate: Aw

Hisiu is a coastal Village in the Central Province of Papua New Guinea. It is located off the Hiritano Highway about 100 kilometres (62 mi) north-west of Port Moresby. The village contains a primary school, two churches, a cemetery and several small local stores.

== Climate ==
Hisiu has a tropical savanna climate (Köppen Aw) with heavy rainfall from December to March and moderate rainfall in the remaining months.

Climate data for Hisiu
Month	Jan	Feb	Mar	Apr	May	Jun	Jul	Aug	Sep	Oct	Nov	Dec	Year
Mean daily maximum °C (°F)	32.0 (89.6)	31.8 (89.2)	31.6 (88.9)	31.2 (88.2)	30.9 (87.6)	29.9 (85.8)	29.3 (84.7)	29.5 (85.1)	30.2 (86.4)	31.0 (87.8)	32.0 (89.6)	32.5 (90.5)	31.0 (87.8)
Daily mean °C (°F)	27.4 (81.3)	27.4 (81.3)	27.3 (81.1)	26.9 (80.4)	26.8 (80.2)	25.8 (78.4)	25.3 (77.5)	25.6 (78.1)	26.2 (79.2)	26.6 (79.9)	27.3 (81.1)	27.7 (81.9)	26.7 (80.0)
Mean daily minimum °C (°F)	22.9 (73.2)	23.0 (73.4)	23.0 (73.4)	22.7 (72.9)	22.7 (72.9)	21.8 (71.2)	21.4 (70.5)	21.7 (71.1)	22.2 (72.0)	22.3 (72.1)	22.6 (72.7)	22.9 (73.2)	22.4 (72.4)
Average rainfall mm (inches)	245 (9.6)	240 (9.4)	252 (9.9)	133 (5.2)	93 (3.7)	82 (3.2)	37 (1.5)	33 (1.3)	53 (2.1)	52 (2.0)	77 (3.0)	176 (6.9)	1,473 (57.8)
Source: Climate-Data.org
