= Guari Rural LLG =

Local-level government in Papua New Guinea

- Location within Papua New Guinea
- Coordinates: 8.134°S 146.840°E
- Country: Papua New Guinea
- Province: Central Province
- District: Goilala District
- Capital: Guari

Area
  - Total: 2,921 km^{2} (1,128 sq mi)

Population (2000)
  - Total: 5,438
  - Density: 1.862/km^{2} (4.822/sq mi)

Languages
  - Main languages: Kunimaipa
- Time zone: UTC+10 (AEST)

Guari Rural LLG is a local-level government area situated in the Goilala District of the Central Province of Papua New Guinea. In 2000, the LLG had 1,148 households, and a population of 5,438 (2,880 men and 2,558 women).

== Wards ==
The area is without a major population centre, and is divided into four wards:

- 53020401 Zarima
- 53020402 Kamulai
- 53020403 Rupila
- 53020404 Zhake

The LLG has a President and a Deputy President, and elections are normally held every five years after the national elections in September.

== Villages ==
- Guari
- Bizoa
- Enaugagave
- Ganiawai
- Ghivena
- Kamulai
- Kelevi
- Koefa
- Koilapo
- Lobudono
- Mariboi
- Omuitu
- Rapaula
- Rupila
- Taveve
- Tonamena
- Torula
- Zhake
