= Kairuku Rural LLG =

- Location within Papua New Guinea
- Coordinates: 8.844°S 146.680°E
- Country: Papua New Guinea
- Province: Central Province
- District: Kairuku-Hiri District
- Capital: Bereina

Government
  - Member for Kairuku-Hiri: Peter Isoaimo

Area
  - Total: 1,747 km^{2} (675 sq mi)

Population (2000)
  - Total: 19,503
  - Density: 11.16/km^{2} (28.91/sq mi)

Languages
  - Main languages: Roro, Nara
- Time zone: UTC+10 (AEST)

The Kairuku Rural LLG is a local level government area situated in the Kairuku-Hiri District of the Central Province of Papua New Guinea. In 2000, the LLG had 3,485 households, and a population of 19,503 (10,273 men and 9,230 women). As of 2007, 3,078 students are enrolled in 20 schools in the LLG. The area is divided into 17 wards, and spreads along the coast on either side of the Hiritano Highway leading north-west from the national capital, Port Moresby.

The coastline is relatively flat with thick vegetation, consisting mainly of savannah grassland, mangroves and eucalyptus trees. A significant portion of the land is mountainous, and is wooded with dense rainforest containing a variety of flora and fauna and numerous tree species such as beech, oak, pine and kwila.

== Wards ==
Wards are:

- 01. Kivori
- 02. Waima Abiara
- 03. Waima/Kore
- 04. Delena
- 05. Nabuapaka
- 06. Chiria
- 07. Abiara
- 08. Biotou
- 09. Rapa
- 10. Mou
- 11. Babiko
- 13. Nara
- 14. Hisiu
- 15. Gabadi/Pinu
- 16. Malati
- 17. Veimauri
- 82. Bereina Urban

== Towns and villages ==
- Bereina (1756)
- Hisiu (1503)
- Babiko (711)
- Biotou (668)
- Kivori-Kui (667)
- Kivori - Poe
- Mou (832)
- Abiara Oreke
- Agevairu
- Aivara
- Avabadina
- Delena
- Diumana
- Doa Plantation
- Hereparu
- Ipaipana
- Kaiau
- Keveona
- Koupuana
- Lolorua
- Magabaira
- Mariboi
- Mava
- Nabuapaka
- Nikura
- Pinu
- Pinupaka
- Poukama
- Rapa
- Tubu
- Ukaukana
- Vanuamai
- Veimauri
- Waima
- Yule Island

== See also ==
- Local-level governments of Papua New Guinea
