= Bereina =

- Location within Papua New Guinea
- Coordinates: 8.6377°S 146.51082°E
- Country: Papua New Guinea
- Province: Central Province
- District: Kairuku-Hiri District
- LLG: Kairuku Rural LLG

Population (2000)
  - Total: 1,756

Languages
  - Main languages: English, Tok Pisin, Roro
  - Traditional language: Roro
- Time zone: UTC+10 (AEST)
- Postcode: 161
- Location: 161 km (100 mi) NW of Port Moresby
- Climate: Aw

Bereina is a town in the Central Province of Papua New Guinea. It is located on the Hiritano Highway about 160 kilometres (100 mi) north-west of Port Moresby, and contains the headquarters of both the Kairuku-Hiri District and the Kairuku Rural local-level government area. Bereina also hosts a regional airport and a district town for the people of Kairuku Rural Area.

== Education ==
Bereina is home to three elementary schools and one primary school. A short distance to the south is Mainohana Catholic High School, a De La Salle Year 9–12 school established in 1958.

== Climate ==
Bereina has a tropical savanna climate (Köppen Aw) with heavy rainfall from December to April and moderate to little rainfall in the remaining months.

Climate data for Bereina
Month	Jan	Feb	Mar	Apr	May	Jun	Jul	Aug	Sep	Oct	Nov	Dec	Year
Mean daily maximum °C (°F)	31.8 (89.2)	31.5 (88.7)	31.4 (88.5)	31.1 (88.0)	30.9 (87.6)	29.8 (85.6)	29.2 (84.6)	29.5 (85.1)	30.1 (86.2)	30.7 (87.3)	31.8 (89.2)	32.1 (89.8)	30.8 (87.5)
Daily mean °C (°F)	27.1 (80.8)	27.0 (80.6)	27.0 (80.6)	26.7 (80.1)	26.7 (80.1)	25.5 (77.9)	25.0 (77.0)	25.4 (77.7)	26.0 (78.8)	26.3 (79.3)	26.9 (80.4)	27.1 (80.8)	26.4 (79.5)
Mean daily minimum °C (°F)	22.4 (72.3)	22.6 (72.7)	22.7 (72.9)	22.4 (72.3)	22.5 (72.5)	21.3 (70.3)	20.9 (69.6)	21.4 (70.5)	21.9 (71.4)	22.0 (71.6)	22.0 (71.6)	22.2 (72.0)	22.0 (71.6)
Average rainfall mm (inches)	236 (9.3)	225 (8.9)	221 (8.7)	131 (5.2)	67 (2.6)	37 (1.5)	24 (0.9)	27 (1.1)	43 (1.7)	50 (2.0)	50 (2.0)	148 (5.8)	1,259 (49.7)
Source: Climate-Data.org
