= Gaire =

- Village
- Location within Papua New Guinea
- Coordinates: 9°40′9″S 147°24′34″E
- Country: Papua New Guinea
- Province: Central Province
- Time zone: UTC+10 (AEST)
- Climate: Aw

Gaire is a coastal village, located 46.6 kilometres (29.0 mi) by road along to coast to the southeast of the centre of Port Moresby, Papua New Guinea. Since at least the early 1980s Gaire has been one of the areas of significant development in the country. It contains the March Girls Resort on Black Beach, owned by businessman and provincial MP Kila Haoda.
