= Geoffrey Irwin =

New Zealand archaeologist and historian

Geoffrey Irwin (born 1941) is a professor of archaeology at the University of Auckland. He was a professor of anthropology at the University of Auckland until he retired in 2008. He is the author of The Prehistoric Exploration and Colonization of the Pacific (1994).
