= Lako =

Lako is a surname and given name. Notable people with this name include:

== Surname ==
- Bujar Lako (1946–2016), Albanian actor
- Fabiano Lako, South Sudanese football player
- Ladule Lako LoSarah (born 1987), South Sudanese football player and coach
- Natasha Lako (born 1948), Albanian author

== Given name ==
- Lako Bodra (1919–1986)
- Lako Bukia, Georgian fashion designer
- Lako Phuti Bhutia (born 1994), Indian football player

== See also ==
- Korçë Airfield, Albania (ICAO code LAKO)
- Laco (disambiguation)
