= Laco (company) =

Norwegian holding company

Laco AS
- Company type: Private
- Industry: Holding
- Headquarters: Austevoll Municipality, Norway
- Revenue: ▲NOK 6,103 million (2006)
- Operating income: NOK 0 million (2006)
- Net income: NOK 0 million (2006)
- Number of employees: 275 (2007)

Laco is a Norwegian holding company that has investments within seafood, shipping and other marine activities. Its main subsidiaries are Austevoll Havfiske, Bravo Tug, DOF Holding, Mogstein and Møgster Management. Through this the company controls DOF, Geo and Austevoll Seafood.
