= Akuku =

Mountain in Bolivia

Highest point
- Elevation: 4,975 m (16,322 ft)

Geography
- Location: Bolivia
- Parent range: Cordillera Apolobamba

Climbing
- First ascent: 2011 by Filip Drożdż (Poland), Marcin Kruczyk (Poland), Tomasz Mucha (Poland) and Magdalena Tworek (Poland)

Akuku is a mountain peak in Cordillera Apolobamba.

== Name ==
Akuku means peek-a-boo in Polish and was chosen by the first to ascend because it is a fun name that also resembles the names of nearby peaks.
