= Zania =

Village in Papua New Guinea

Zania is a village in the Tapini Rural LLG of Goilala District of Papua New Guinea.
