= Keapara language =

Austronesian language spoken in Papua New Guinea

Keapara
- Native to: Papua New Guinea
- Region: Central Province
- Native speakers: (19,000 cited 2000)
- Language family: Austronesian: Malayo-Polynesian; Oceanic; Western Oceanic; Papuan Tip; Central; Sinagoro–Keapara; Hula–Keapara; Keapara

Language codes
- ISO 639-3: khz
- Glottolog: keap1239
- Coordinates: 10.044°S 147.786°E

Keapara is an Oceanic language of Papua New Guinea. It is close to, but distinct from, its neighbour Hula.

It has been strongly influenced by Papuan languages.

== Dialects ==
The Keapara language includes several dialectal varieties: Aroma, Babaka, Kamali, Kalo, Keapara (Kerepunu), Kapari, Lalaura, Maopa, Wanigela (Waiori).

== Phonology ==
The following is the phonology of the Kalo dialect of Keapara:

=== Consonants ===
	Labial	Alveolar	Velar		Uvular	
	Labial	Alveolar	plain	lab.	plain	lab.
Plosive	p	t	k	kʷ	q	qʷ
Nasal	m	n				
Fricative	v		ɣ			
Tap		ɾ				
Lateral		l				
Glide	w					

=== Vowels ===
	Front	Central	Back
High	i		u
Mid	e		o
Low		a	

== Bibliography ==
- Dutton, T. "Lau'una: another Austronesian remnant on the south-east coast of Papua". In Lynch, J. and Pat, F.'A. editors, Oceanic Studies: Proceedings of the First International Conference on Oceanic Linguistics. C-133:61-82. Pacific Linguistics, The Australian National University, 1996. doi:10.15144/PL-C133.61
