= Woitape Rural LLG =

Local-level government in Papua New Guinea

- Location within Papua New Guinea
- Coordinates: 8.63°S 147.24°E
- Country: Papua New Guinea
- Province: Central Province
- Time zone: UTC+10 (AEST)

Woitape Rural LLG is a local-level government (LLG) of Central Province, Papua New Guinea.

== Wards ==
1. Evesa
2. Yongai
3. Kumunga
4. Kulama
5. Kambise
6. Horo
7. Ononge Mission Station
8. Kosipe Tanipai
9. Garime
10. Kone
11. Woitape Station
12. Mondo Tolukuma
13. Fane
14. Kodige
