= Mekeo Kuni Rural LLG =

Local-level government in Papua New Guinea

- Country: Papua New Guinea
- Province: Central Province
- Time zone: UTC+10 (AEST)

Mekeo Kuni Rural LLG is a local-level government (LLG) of Central Province, Papua New Guinea.

== Wards ==
- 01. Aipeana
- 02. Veifa'a
- 03. Rarai
- 04. Ianwaui
- 05. Eboa
- 06. Inawabui
- 07. Inawaia
- 08. Inaoae (Angabanga)
- 09. Bebeo
- 10. Jeku
- 11. Inaui
- 12. Ameiaka
- 13. Babanongo
- 14. Maipa
- 15. Apanaipi
- 16. Upper Kuni
- 17. Lower Kuni
- 18. Kubuina
- 19. Bakoiudu
- 20. Iesubaibua
- 21. Amoamo
- 22. Waika
- 23. Egefa
- 24. Orirobetana
