= Rigo Central Rural LLG =

Local-level government in Papua New Guinea

- Country: Papua New Guinea
- Province: Central Province
- Time zone: UTC+10 (AEST)

Rigo Central Rural LLG is a local-level government (LLG) of Central Province, Papua New Guinea.

== Wards ==
- 01 Sabuia
- 02 Manugoro
- 03 Girabu
- 04 Gobuia
- 05 Gomore
- 06 Gamunomu (babaga)
- 07 Kemaea
- 08 Kwalimurubu
- 09 Saroa
- 10 Gidobada
- 11 Kodogere
- 12 Geresi
- 13 Wasira
- 14 Kwikila Town
- 15 Imuagoro
- 16 Saroakeina
- 17 Sivitatana
- 18 Boregaina
- 19 Daroakomana
- 20 Bigairuka
- 21 Bore
- 22 Niuiruka
- 23 Londairi
- 24 Agitana
- 25 Iaudobu
- 26 Karekodobu
- 27 Kware
- 28 Gaunomu
- 29 Nafenanomu
- 30 Dirinomu
- 81. Kwikila Urban
