= Rigo Inland Rural LLG =

Local-level government in Papua New Guinea

- Country: Papua New Guinea
- Province: Central Province
- Time zone: UTC+10 (AEST)

Rigo Inland Rural LLG is a local-level government (LLG) of Central Province, Papua New Guinea.

== Wards ==
- 01. Upper Maria
- 02. Central Maria
- 03. East Maria
- 04. West Maria
- 05. Ormand East
- 06. Ormand Central
- 07. Ormand West
- 08. Upper Mt. Brown
- 09. Central Mt. Brown
- 10. Lower Mt. Brown
- 11. Upper Boku/Doromu
- 12. Central Boku/Doromu
- 13. Lower Boku/Doromu
- 14. Upper Mt. Obree
- 15. Central Mt. Obree
- 16. Lower Mt. Obree
