= Cloudy Bay Rural LLG =

Local-level government in Papua New Guinea

- Location within Papua New Guinea
- Coordinates: 10.047°S 148.690°E
- Country: Papua New Guinea
- Province: Central Province
- Time zone: UTC+10 (AEST)

Cloudy Bay Rural LLG is a local-level government (LLG) of Central Province, Papua New Guinea.

== Wards ==
- 01. Boru
- 02. Doma
- 03. Robinson River
- 04. Si'ini
- 05. Duramu
- 06. Ganai
- 07. Amau
- 08. Ianu
- 09. Domara
- 10. Baramata
- 11. Tutubu
- 12. Merani
- 13. Manabo
- 14. Dom
- 15. Cocoalands
- 85. Moreguina Urban
