= Rigo Coastal Rural LLG =

Local-level government in Papua New Guinea

- Country: Papua New Guinea
- Province: Central Province
- Time zone: UTC+10 (AEST)

Rigo Coastal Rural LLG is a local-level government (LLG) of Central Province, Papua New Guinea.

== 26 Wards in Rigo Coast LLG ==
. 26.Deugolo/tagana

- 25. Gabagaba
- 24. Ginigolo
- 23. Gunuga
- 22. Gabone
- 21. Tauruba
- 20.Gamoga
- 19. Kemabolo
- 18.Bonanamo
- 17.Walai
- 16. Galomarupu
- 15.Riwalirupu
- 14.Gemo
- 13. Babagarubu
- 12.kalo
- 11. Babaka
- 10. Kamali
- 09. Makerupu
- 08. Irupara
- 07. Alewai
- 06. Hula
- 05. Keapara
- 04. Alukuni
- 03. Karawa
- 02.Golupu
