= Efogi =

Town in the Central Province of Papua New Guinea

- Country: Papua New Guinea
- Province: Central Province
- Time zone: UTC+10:00 (Papua New Guinea Standard Time)

Efogi is a town in the Central Province of Papua New Guinea. It is served by air via Efogi Airport.
