= Hiri Rural LLG =

Local-level government in Papua New Guinea

- Country: Papua New Guinea
- Province: Central Province
- Time zone: UTC+10 (AEST)

Hiri Rural LLG is a local-level government (LLG) of Central Province, Papua New Guinea.

== Wards ==
- 01. Porebada
- 02. Boera
- 03. Papa
- 04. Roku
- 05. Lealea
- 06. Kido
- 07. Manumanu
- 08. Barakau
- 09. Tubusereia
- 10. Mt. Diamond
- 11. Gaire
- 12. Dagoda
- 13. Akuku
- 14. Laloki
- 15. Vanapa
- 16. Kerea
- 17. Brown River
- 18. Boteka
