= Eboa =

Eboa is both a given name and a surname. Notable people with the name include:

- Eboa Lotin (1942–1997), Cameroonian artist
- Félix Eboa Eboa (born 1997), Cameroonian footballer
- Ahmadou Eboa Ngomna (born 1983), Cameroonian footballer
- Steeve-Mike Eboa Ebongue (born 2001), French footballer
