= Aroma Rural LLG =

Local-level government in Papua New Guinea

- Country: Papua New Guinea
- Province: Central Province
- Time zone: UTC+10 (AEST)

Aroma Rural LLG is a local-level government (LLG) of Central Province, Papua New Guinea.

== Ward ==
- 01. Paramana
- 02. Pelagai
- 03. Maopa
- 04. Gaivakalana
- 05. Egala Auna
- 06. Waro/Iruone
- 07. Kwapeupa Kelekapana
- 08. Wairavanua
- 09. Vuru
- 10. Kelerakwa
- 11. Bukuku
- 12. Upulima
- 13. Waiori
- 14. Wanigela
- 15. Gavuone
- 16. Kapari
- 17. Lalaura
- 84. Kupiano Urban
