= Ceraea =

Former town in Ancient Crete

Coordinates: 35°24′10″N 23°57′21″E

Ceraea or Keraia (Ancient Greek: Κεραία), also known as Cerea or Kerea (Κερέα), Ceraeae or Keraiai (Κεραῖαι), was a town of ancient Crete. It is mentioned by Polybius, and minted coins similar to those of Polyrrhenia in antiquity.

The site of Ceraea is tentatively located near modern Meskla.
