= Koiari Rural LLG =

Local-level government in Papua New Guinea

- Country: Papua New Guinea
- Province: Central Province
- Time zone: UTC+10 (AEST)

Koiari Rural LLG is a local-level government (LLG) of Central Province, Papua New Guinea.

== Wards ==
- 01. Osabewai
- 03.Mesime
- 06. Vaiagai
- 07. Furimuti
- . Depo (Mageri)
- 06. Vesilogo
- 07. Bereadabu
- 08. Kailaki
- 09. Doe
- 10. Ogotana
- 11. Kahitana
- 12. Berebei
- 13. Varutanumu
- 14. Suria/Kotoi
- 15. Boridi
- 16. Kagi
- 17. Efogi
- 18. Manari
- 19. Edevu
- 20. Sogeri Urban
- 83. Sogeri Urban
- 86. Goldie Urban 01
