= Amazon Bay Rural LLG =

Local-level government in Papua New Guinea

- Country: Papua New Guinea
- Province: Central Province
- Time zone: UTC+10 (AEST)

Amazon Bay Rural LLG is a local-level government (LLG) of Central Province, Papua New Guinea.

== Wards ==
- 01. Doriodua
- 02. Banaoro
- 03. Losoa
- 04. Bogea
- 05. Launoga
- 06. Ade/Ebu
- 07. Barauoro
- 08. Goiseoro
- 09. Danava
- 10. Daena
- 11. Warumen
- 12. Abasi
- 13. Malaoro
- 14. Kenene
- 15. Nonou
- 16. Aloke
