= Languages of Papua New Guinea =

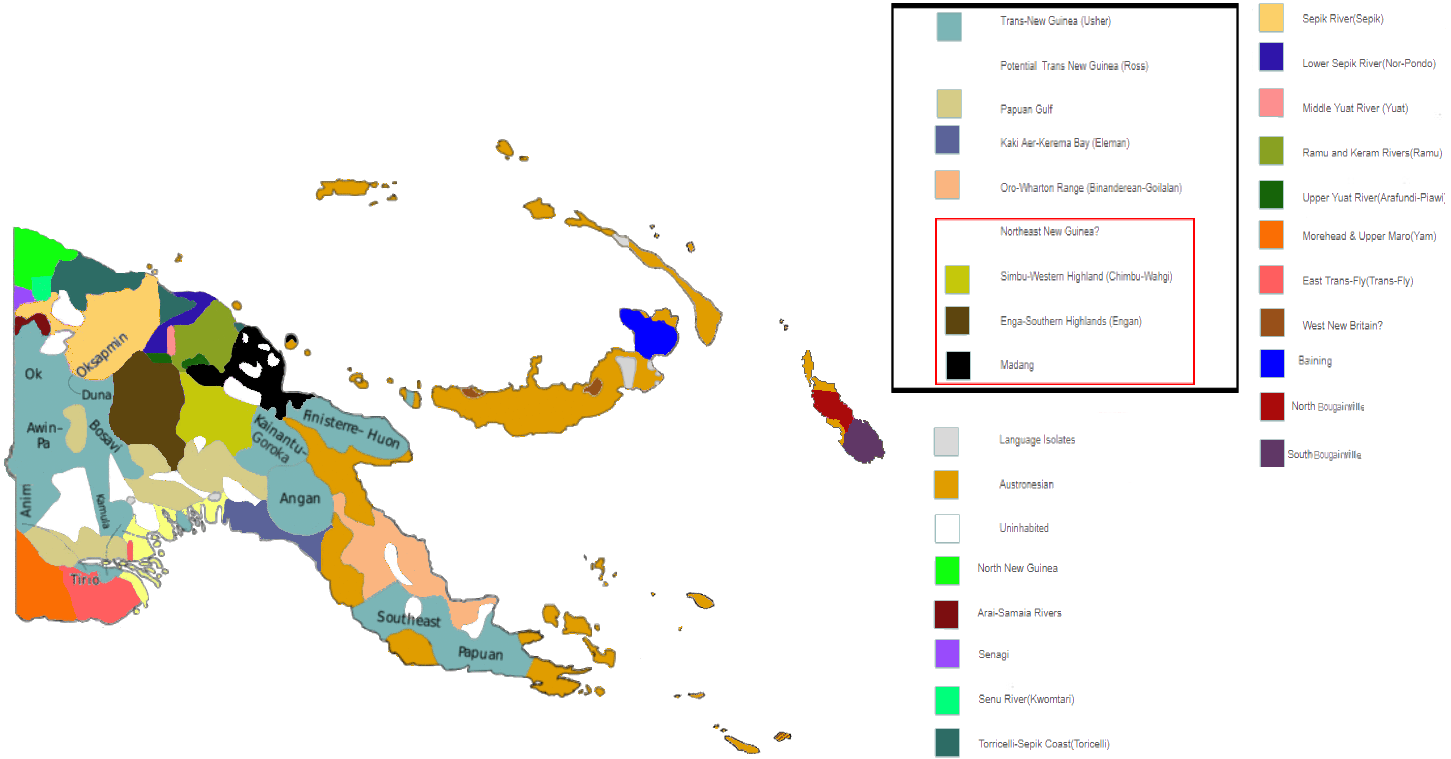
- National: Tok Pisin (used nationwide), English, Hiri Motu (Central and Gulf provinces.), Papua New Guinean Sign Language
- Indigenous: Papuan languages, Austronesian languages
- Immigrant: Chinese

Papua New Guinea, a sovereign state in Oceania, is the most linguistically diverse country in the world. Ethnologue, among other sources, state that there are 840 living languages spoken in the country, although estimates vary due to the distinction between a language and a dialect. In 2006, Papua New Guinea Prime Minister Sir Michael Somare stated that "Papua New Guinea has 832 living languages (languages, not dialects)." 25 of those languages are officially recognized, with the country's lingua franca (and vernacular for some) being Tok Pisin, an English-based creole (although standard English is typically used in government, education, and formal writing).

Most of these are classified as indigenous Papuan languages, which form a diverse sprachbund across the island of New Guinea. There are also many Austronesian languages spoken in Papua New Guinea, most of which are classified as Western Oceanic languages, as well as some Admiralty Islands languages and Polynesian Ellicean–Outlier languages in a few outer islands. Since the late 19th century, West Germanic languages — namely English and German — have also been spoken and adapted into creoles such as Tok Pisin, Torres Strait Creole and Unserdeutsch.

Languages with statutory recognition are Tok Pisin, English, Hiri Motu, and Papua New Guinean Sign Language. Papua New Guinean Sign Language became the fourth officially recognised language in May 2015, and is used by the deaf population throughout the country.

== Languages ==
=== English ===
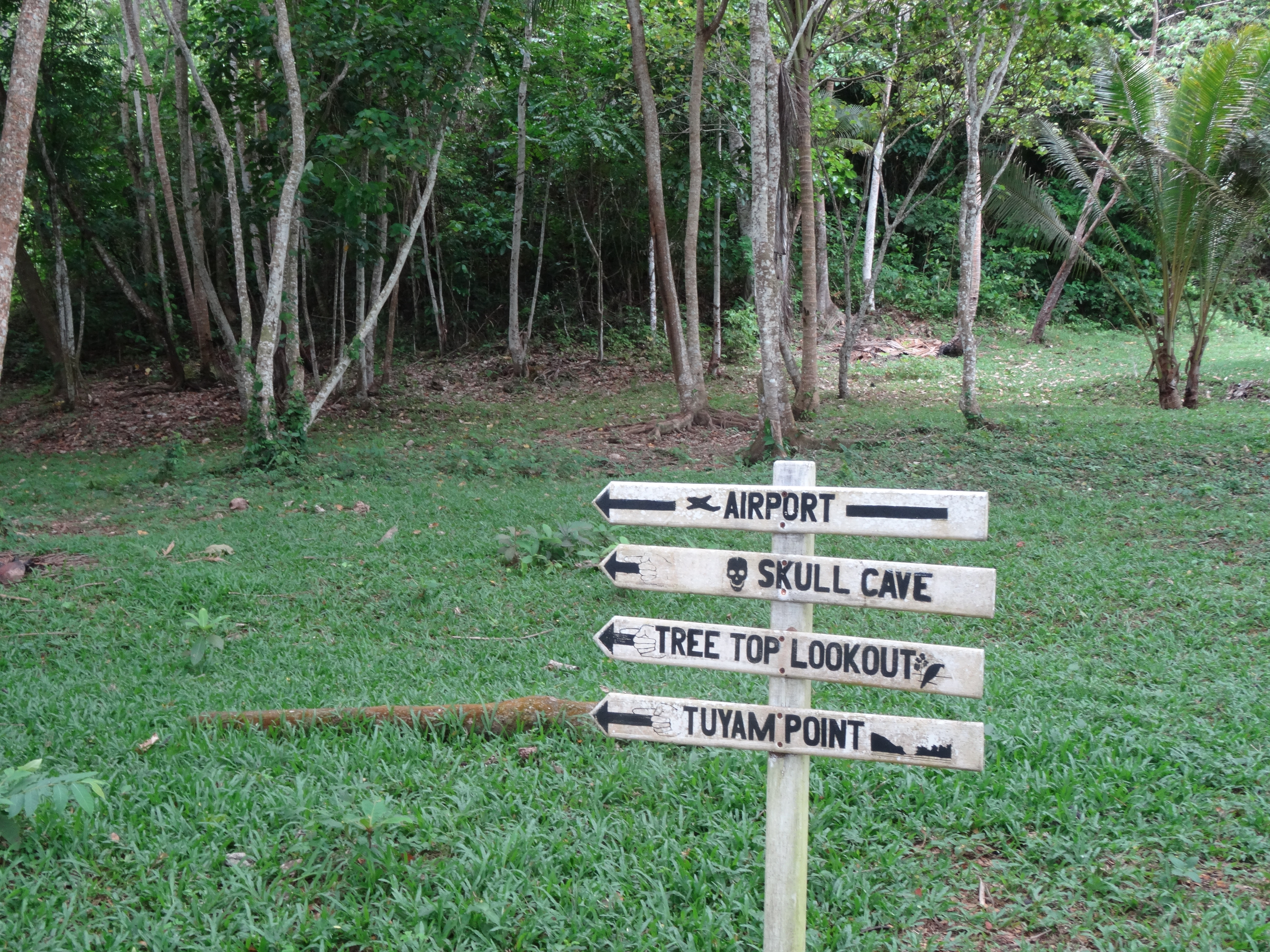
English-language sign on Doini Island

English is a language of Papua New Guinea and is used by the government, courts, and the education system. Although no official data in the last decade is easily available, the 2011 census states that 39.9% of the population was literate in English.

=== German ===
From 1884 to 1914, the northern half of the present-day country was a German colony known as German New Guinea, in which German was the official language. Tok Pisin derives some vocabulary from German as a result of this influence. Today however, German is not a generally spoken language in Papua New Guinea.

=== Unserdeutsch ===
Unserdeutsch, or Rabaul Creole German, is a German-based creole language spoken mainly in East New Britain Province. The lexicon is derived from German, while the substrate language is Tok Pisin.

=== Tok Pisin ===
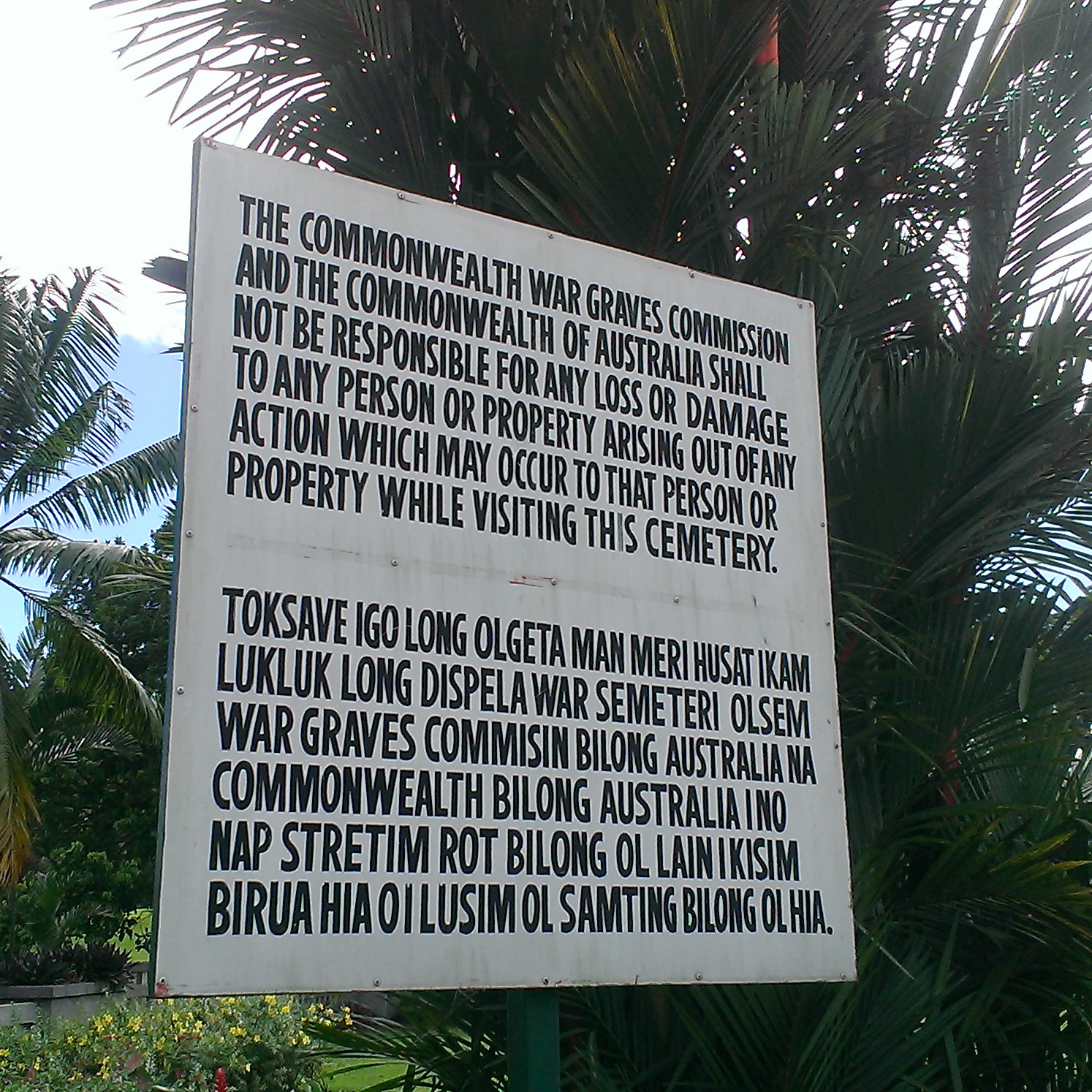
English/Tok Pisin sign at Lae War Cemetery.

Tok Pisin is an English-based creole language spoken throughout Papua New Guinea. It is an official language of Papua New Guinea and the most widely used language in the country. In parts of Western, Gulf, Central, Oro and Milne Bay provinces, however, the use of Tok Pisin has a shorter history, and is less universal especially among older people. In the 2011 census, 68.4% of the population were literate in Tok Pisin.

=== Hiri Motu ===
Hiri Motu, also known as Police Motu, Pidgin Motu, or just Hiri, is a simplified version of the Motu language of the Austronesian language family. In the 2011 census, 4.7% of the population were literate in Hiri Motu.

=== Papuan languages ===
The Trans-New Guinea Family according to Malcolm Ross

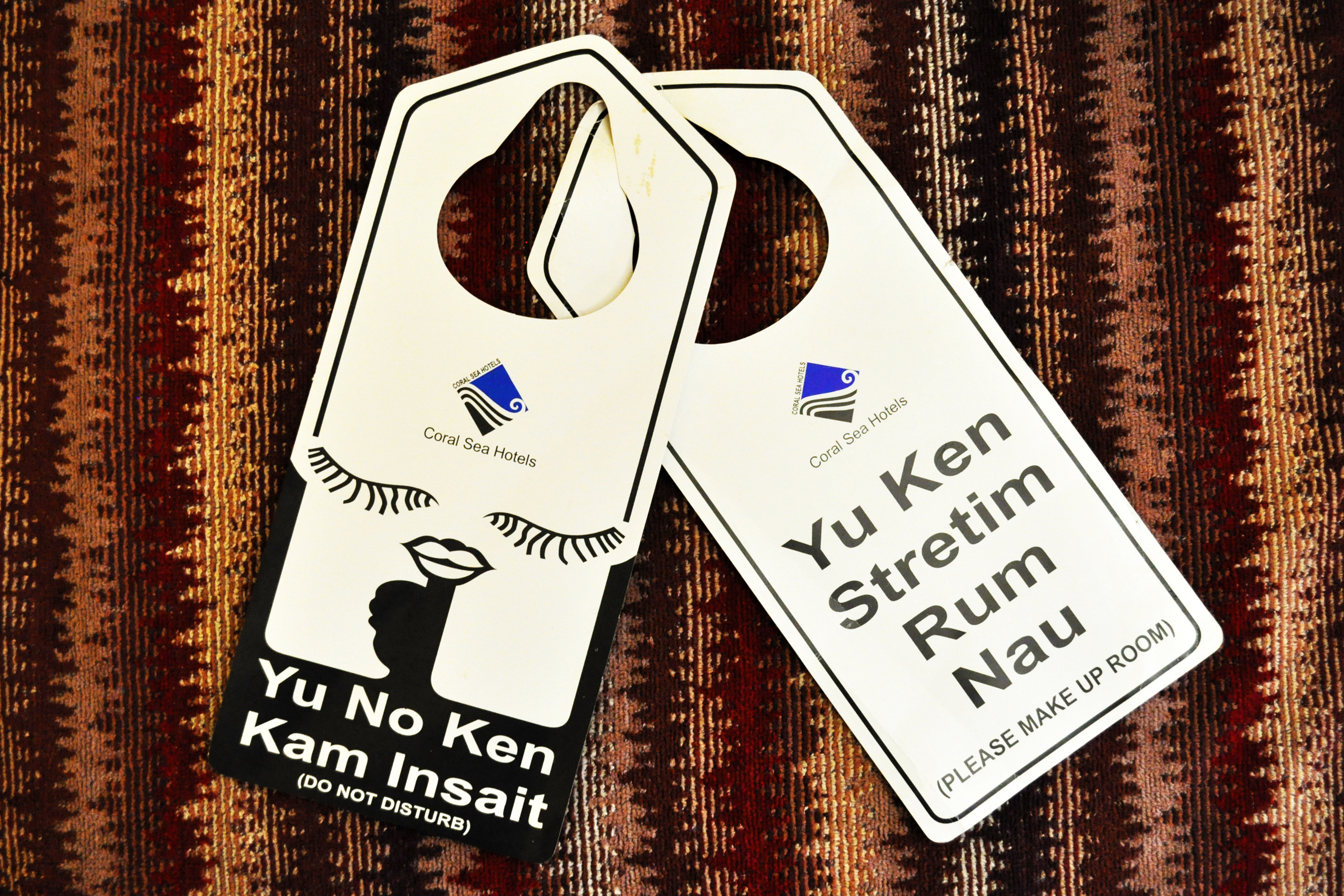
Hotel Room Door Signs in Papua New Guinea

Outside Papua New Guinea, Papuan languages that are also spoken include the languages of Indonesia, East Timor, and Solomon Islands.

Below is a full list of Papuan language families spoken in Papua New Guinea, following Palmer, et al. (2018):

1. Trans-New Guinea
  1. Madang
  2. Finisterre-Huon
  3. Kainantu-Goroka
  4. Chimbu-Wahgi
  5. Enga-Kewa-Huli
  6. Bosavi
  7. East Strickland
  8. Kutubu
  9. Duna-Bogaya
  10. Wiru
  11. Ok-Oksapmin (also in Indonesia)
  12. Anim (also in Indonesia)
  13. Gogodala-Suki
  14. Turama-Kikori
  15. Kiwaian
  16. Awin-Pa
  17. Angan
  18. Greater Binanderean
  19. Dagan
  20. Mailuan
  21. Koiarian
  22. Goilalan
  23. Yareban
  24. Kwalean
  25. Manubaran
2. Torricelli
3. Sepik
4. Lower Sepik-Ramu
5. Border (also in Indonesia)
6. Sko (also in Indonesia)
7. Eastern Pauwasi (also in Indonesia)
8. Senagi (Angor-Dera) (also in Indonesia)
9. Kwomtari
10. Leonhard Schultze (Walio-Papi)
11. Upper Yuat (Arafundi-Piawi)
12. Yuat
13. Left May
14. Amto-Musan
15. Busa
16. Taiap
17. Yadë
18. Yam (also in Indonesia)
19. Pahoturi River
20. Eleman
21. Oriomo
22. Teberan
23. Doso-Turumsa
24. Dibiyaso
25. Kaki Ae
26. Kamula
27. Karami
28. Pawaia
29. Porome
30. Purari
31. Tabo
32. Baining
33. North Bougainville
34. South Bougainville
35. Butam-Taulil
36. Anêm
37. Ata
38. Kol
39. Kuot
40. Makolkol
41. Sulka
42. Yélî Dnye

=== Austronesian languages ===
People speaking languages belonging to the Austronesian family arrived in New Guinea approximately 3,500 years ago.

All the Austronesian languages spoken in Papua New Guinea belong to its Oceanic subgroup. More precisely, these languages belong to four branches of Oceanic:

- St Matthias
- Admiralty Islands
- Western Oceanic
  - North New Guinea
  - Meso-Melanesian
  - Papuan Tip
- Polynesian outliers

=== Papua New Guinean Sign Language ===
PNGSL is an official language of Papua New Guinea; it is based on Auslan and various home sign forms.

== Literacy ==
In 2011, 67.6% of the population of Papua New Guinea over 10 years of age were literate.

== See also ==
- Papua New Guinean literature
- Education in Papua New Guinea
