= Central Province (Papua New Guinea) =

Province in Papua New Guinea

Central Province Sentral Provins (Tok Pisin)
- Flag

- Central Province in Papua New Guinea
- Coordinates: 9°30′S 147°40′E
- Country: Papua New Guinea
- Capital: Port Moresby
- Districts: List: Abau District; Goilala District; Kairuku-Hiri District; Rigo District; Hiri-Koiari District

Government
  - Governor: Rufina Peter

Area
  - Total: 29,998 km^{2} (11,582 sq mi)

Population (2011 census)
  - Total: 269,756
  - Density: 8.9925/km^{2} (23.290/sq mi)
- Time zone: UTC+10 (AEST)
- HDI (2018): 0.556 medium · 10th of 22

Central Province is a province in Papua New Guinea located on the southern coast of the country. It has a population of 237,016 (2010 census) people and is 29,998 square kilometres (11,582 sq mi) in size. The seat of government of Central Province, which is located within the National Capital District outside the province, is the Port Moresby suburb of Konedobu. On 9 October 2007, the Central Province government announced plans to build a new provincial capital city at Bautama, which lies within Central Province near Port Moresby, although there has been little progress in constructing it.

Whereas Tok Pisin is the main lingua franca in all Papua New Guinean towns, in part of the southern mainland coastal area centred on Central Province, Hiri Motu is a stronger lingua franca (but not in Port Moresby).

== Districts and LLGs ==
Each province in Papua New Guinea has one or more districts, and each district has one or more Local Level Government (LLG) areas. For census purposes, the LLG areas are subdivided into wards and those into census units.

| District | District Capital | LLG Name |
|---|---|---|
| Abau District | Abau | Amazon Bay Rural |
| Abau District | Abau | Aroma Rural |
| Abau District | Abau | Cloudy Bay Rural |
| Goilala District | Tapini | Guari Rural |
| Goilala District | Tapini | Tapini Rural |
| Goilala District | Tapini | Woitape Rural |
| Kairuku District | Bereina | Kairuku Rural |
| Kairuku District | Bereina | Mekeo Kuni Rural |
| Rigo District | Kwikila | Rigo Central Rural |
| Rigo District | Kwikila | Rigo Coastal Rural |
| Rigo District | Kwikila | Rigo Inland Rural |
| Hiri-Koiari | Bautama | Hiri Rural |
| Hiri-Koiari | Bautama | Koiari Rural |

== Provincial leaders ==
The province was governed by a decentralised provincial administration, headed by a Premier, from 1976 to 1995. Following reforms taking effect that year, the national government reassumed some powers, and the role of Premier was replaced by a position of Governor, to be held by the winner of the province-wide seat in the National Parliament of Papua New Guinea.

=== Premiers (1976–1995) ===
| Premier | Term |
|---|---|
| Gau Henao | 1976–1978 |
| Rina Nau | 1978–1982 |
| Kone Vanuawaru | 1983 |
| Reuben Taureka | 1983–1984 |
| Kone Vanuawaru | 1984–1987 |
| Emmanuel Ume | 1988–1991 |
| Isaiah Oda | 1991–1993 |
| Paul Kipo | 1993–1995 |

=== Governors (1995–present) ===
| Governor | Term |
|---|---|
| John Orea | 1995–1997 |
| Ted Diro | 1997–1999 |
| Ajax Bia | 1999 |
| Opa Taureka | 1999–2002 |
| Alphonse Moroi | 2002–2012 |
| Kila Haoda | 2012–2017 |
| Robert Agarobe | 2017–2022 |
| Rufina Peter | 2022–present |

== Members of the National Parliament ==
The province and each district is represented by a Member of the National Parliament. There is one provincial electorate and each district is an open electorate.

| Electorate | Member |
|---|---|
| Central Provincial | Rufina Peter |
| Abau Open | Sir Puka Temu |
| Goilala Open | Casmiro Aia |
| Kairuku Open | Peter Isoaimo |
| Rigo Open | Sir Ano Pala |
| Hiri-koiari Open | Keith Iduhu |

== Notable people ==
- Julia Mage’au Gray (born 1973) - choreographer and tattoo artist.

== Sources/further reading ==
- Hanson, L.W., Allen, B.J., Bourke, R.M. and McCarthy, T.J. (2001). Papua New Guinea Rural Development Handbook. Land Management Group, Research School of Pacific and Asian Studies, The Australian National University, Canberra. Available as a 30 Megabyte PDF.
