= Amphlett Islands =

Island group

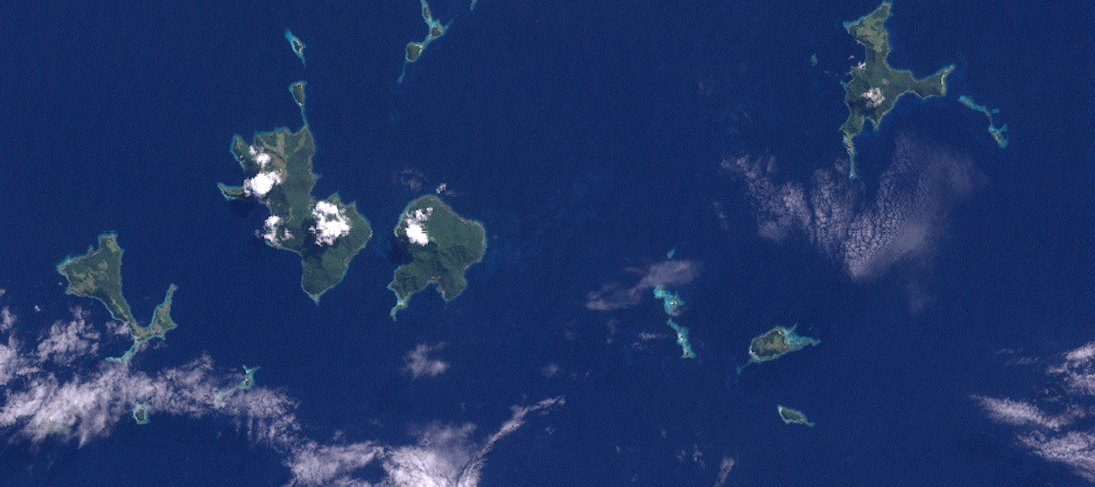
- Landsat 7 image of the Amphlett Islands

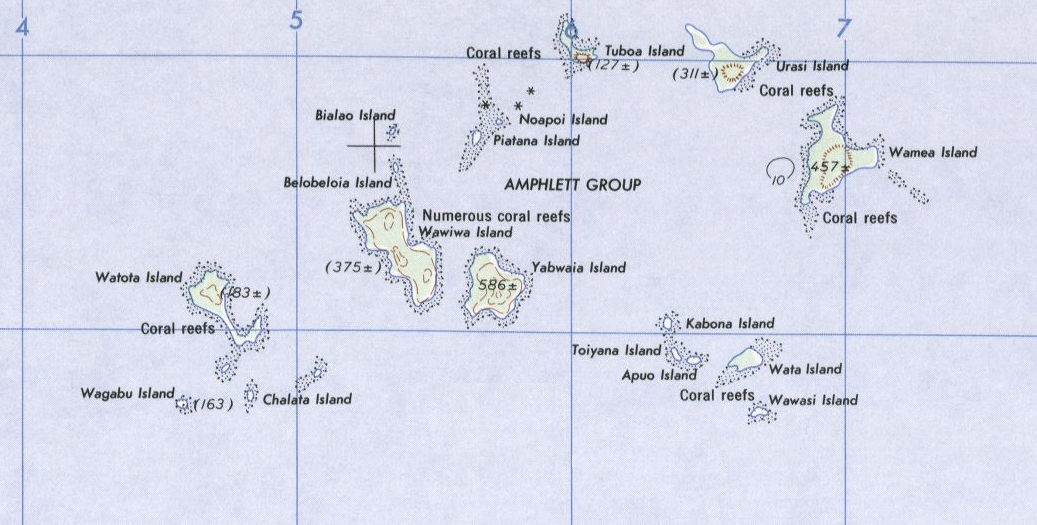

Geography
- Coordinates: 9.25°S 150.83333°E
- Archipelago: D'Entrecasteaux Islands
- Adjacent to: Solomon Islands
- Total islands: 18
- Major islands: Wamea, Wawiwa, Yabwaia
- Area: 25 km^{2} (9.7 sq mi)
- Highest elevation: 586 m (1923 ft)

Administration
- Papua New Guinea
- Province: Milne Bay
- LLG: Dobu Rural

The Amphlett Islands (sometimes called the Amphlett Isles or Amphlett group) are an archipelago in the Solomon Sea. Administratively, they belong to Papua New Guinea's Milne Bay Province, in the Dobu Rural local-level government. Some sources consider the group of 18 islands to be part of the larger D'Entrecasteaux Islands, and they lie about 10 km north of Fergusson Island.

== Description ==
The Amphlett Islands are volcanic in origin.

== Demographics ==
As of 2000, the population of the islands was 469. The population in 1970 was estimated at 230.

The peoples of the Amphlett Islands are known for their pottery and their role in the kula trade. Clay pots are the most important source of cash for the islanders.
