= Teldenia pura =

Scientific classification
- Domain: Eukaryota
- Kingdom: Animalia
- Phylum: Arthropoda
- Class: Insecta
- Order: Lepidoptera
- Family: Drepanidae
- Genus: Teldenia
- Species: T. pura

Binomial name
- Teldenia pura Warren, 1899

Species of hook-tip moth

Teldenia pura is a moth in the family Drepanidae. It was described by Warren in 1899. It is found in New Guinea and on Goodenough Island, Fergusson Island and Admiralty Island.

The length of the forewings is 11–13 mm for males and 9.5–15 mm for females.
