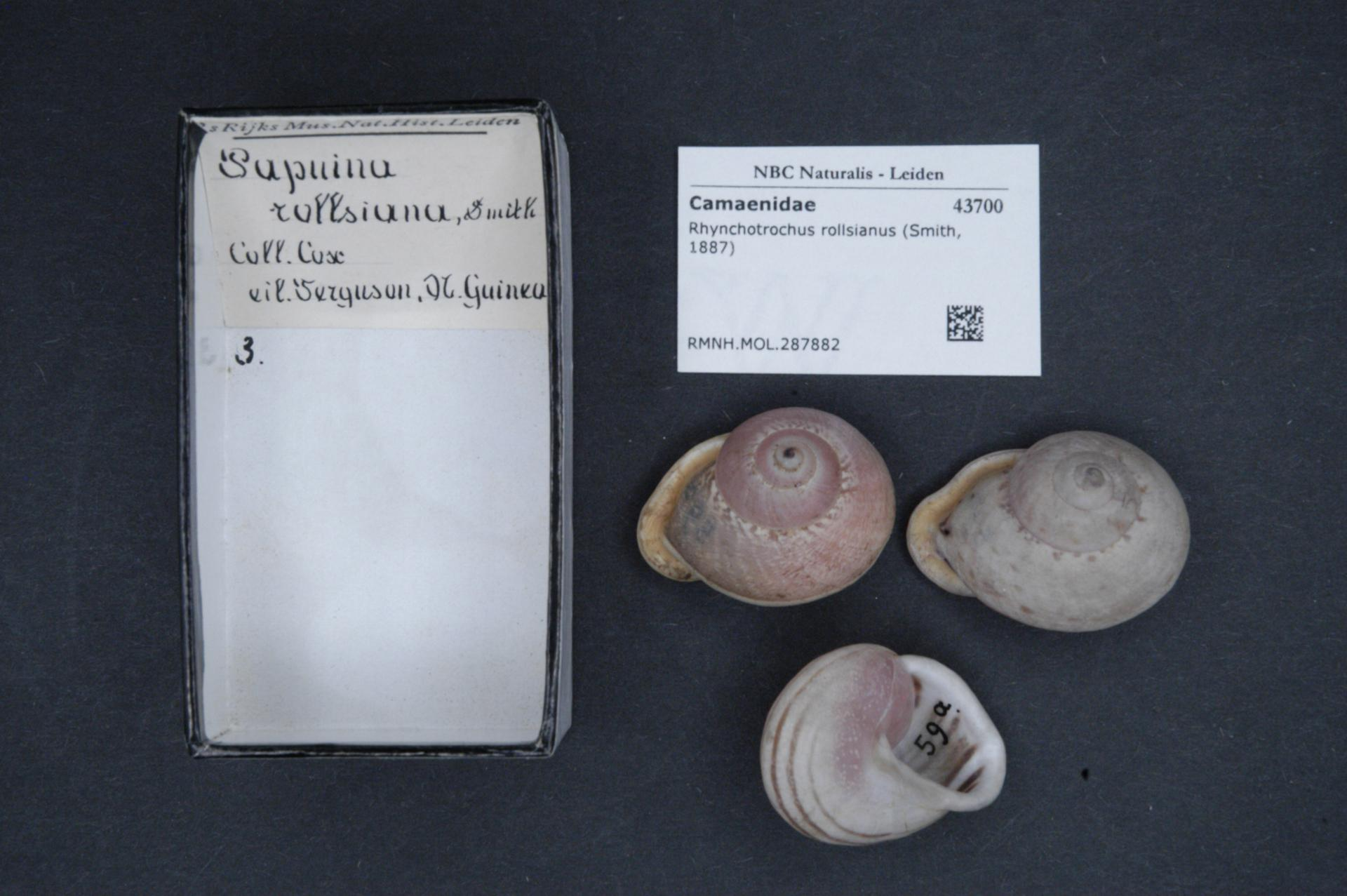

Scientific classification
- Domain: Eukaryota
- Kingdom: Animalia
- Phylum: Mollusca
- Class: Gastropoda
- Order: Stylommatophora
- Family: Camaenidae
- Genus: Rhynchotrochus
- Species: R. rollsianus

Binomial name
- Rhynchotrochus rollsianus (E.A.Smith, 1887))

Synonyms
- Helix (Papuina) rollsiana E.A.Smith, 1887; Papuina rollsiana E.A.Smith, 1887; Rhynchotrochus (Rhynchotrochus) rollsianus (E. A. Smith, 1887)· accepted, alternate representation; Volenga rollsiana (E.A.Smith, 1887)

= Rhynchotrochus rollsianus =

Species of gastropod

Rhynchotrochus rollsianus is a species of land snail in the family Camaenidae.

It was first described by Edgar Albert Smith in 1887 as Helix (Papuina) rollsiana.

A later (detailed) redescription (in Latin, in 1897) of a specimen from Ferguson Island in the D'Entrecasteaux Archipelago, is given by Wilhelm Kobelt and others. In 1941 Tom Iredale ascribed it to the new genus, Volenga, to give the new name Volenga rollsiana.

== Description ==
The shell is depressed, with a rounded periphery. It is broader than tall and the shell has a violet mottling.

== Distribution ==
This species has been found in Papua New Guinea.

== Gallery ==
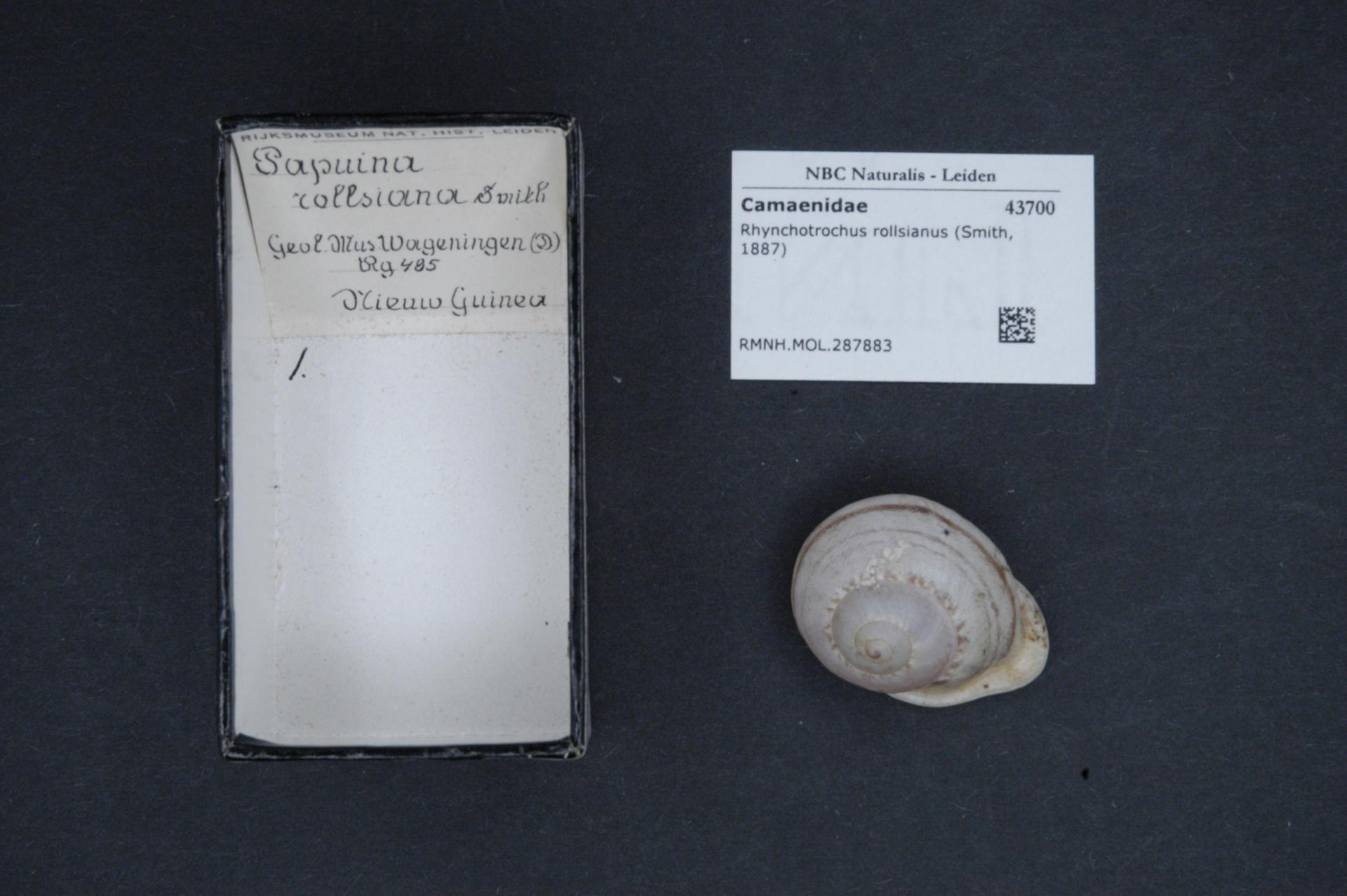

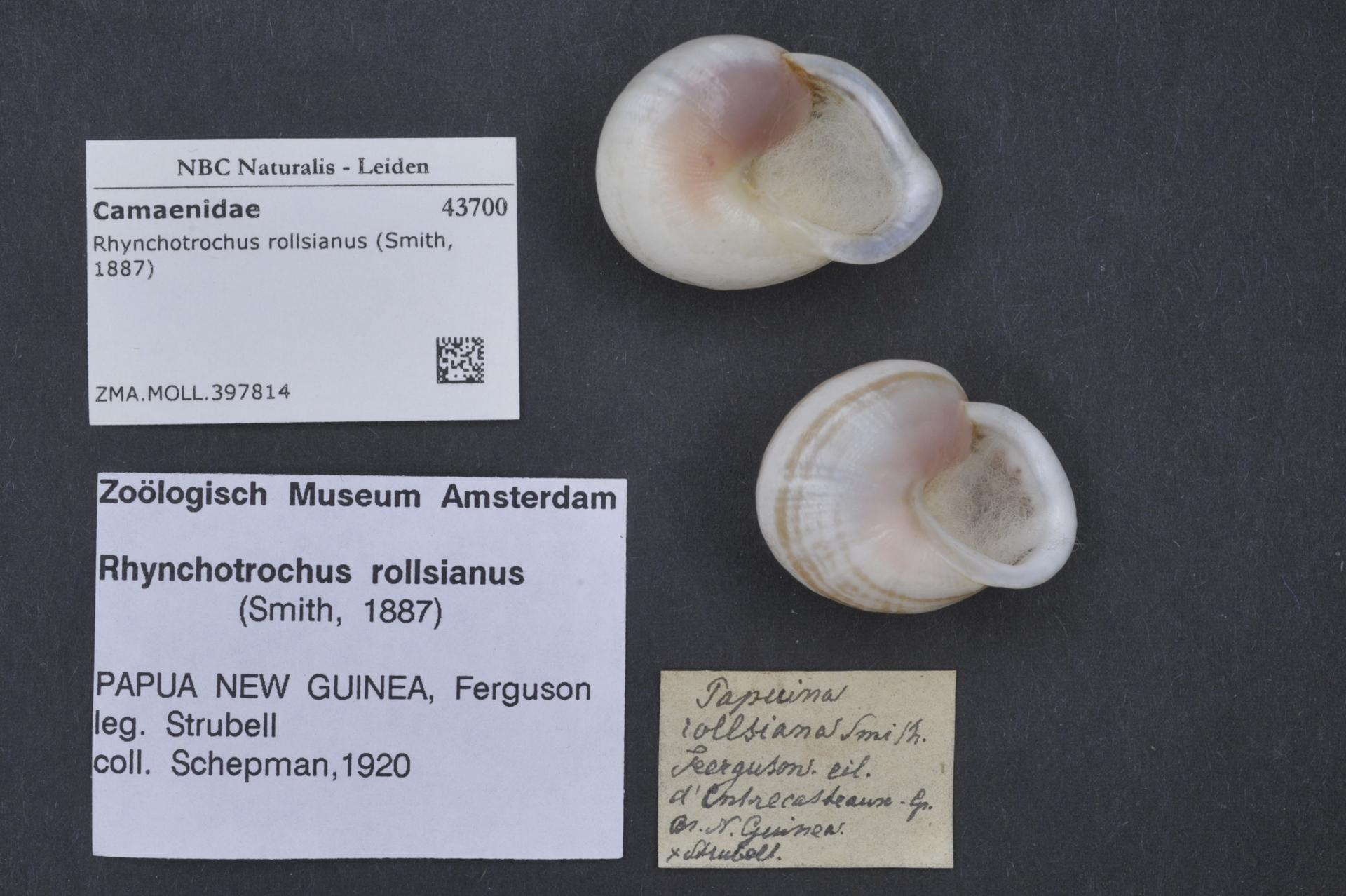

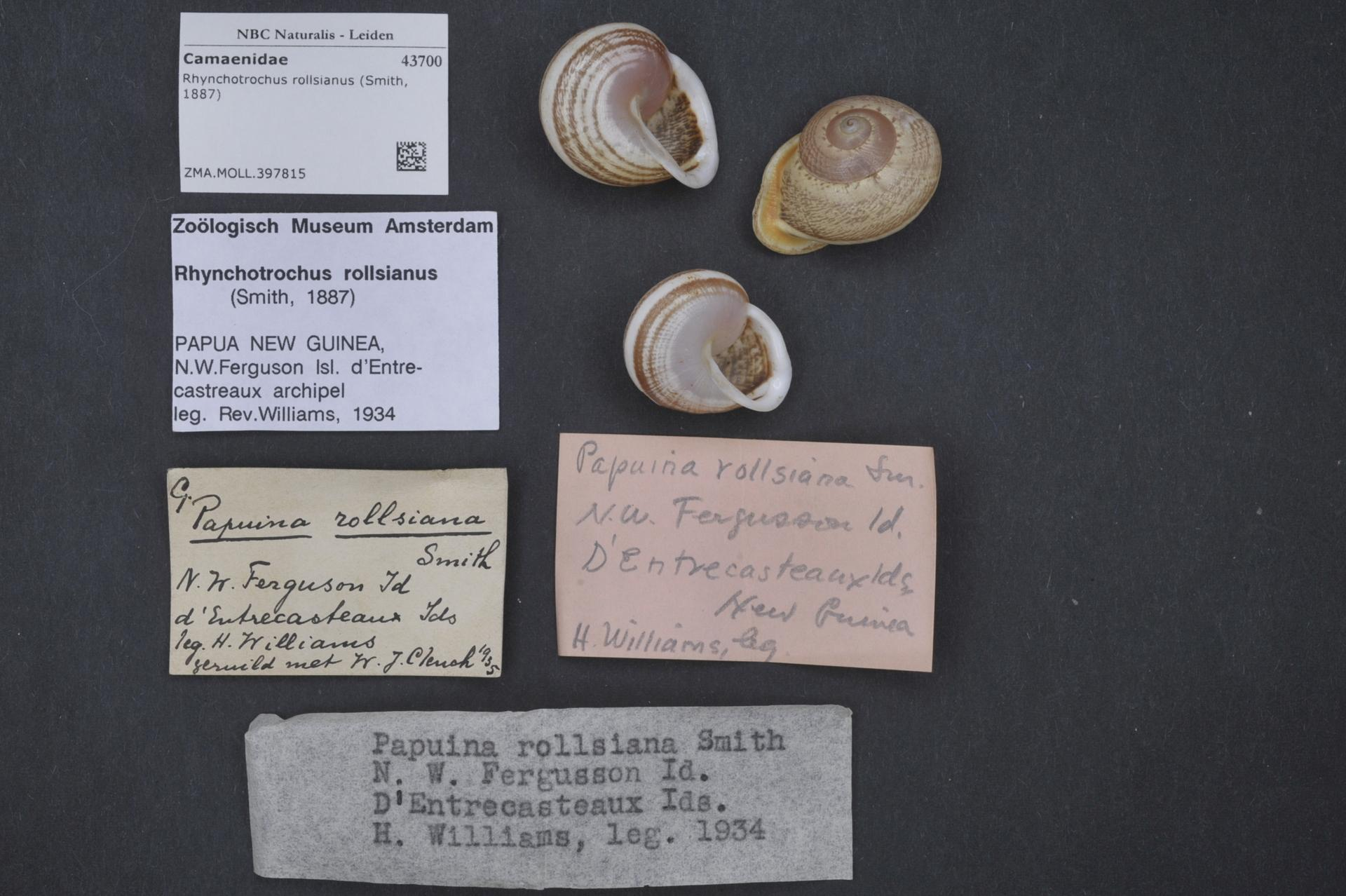

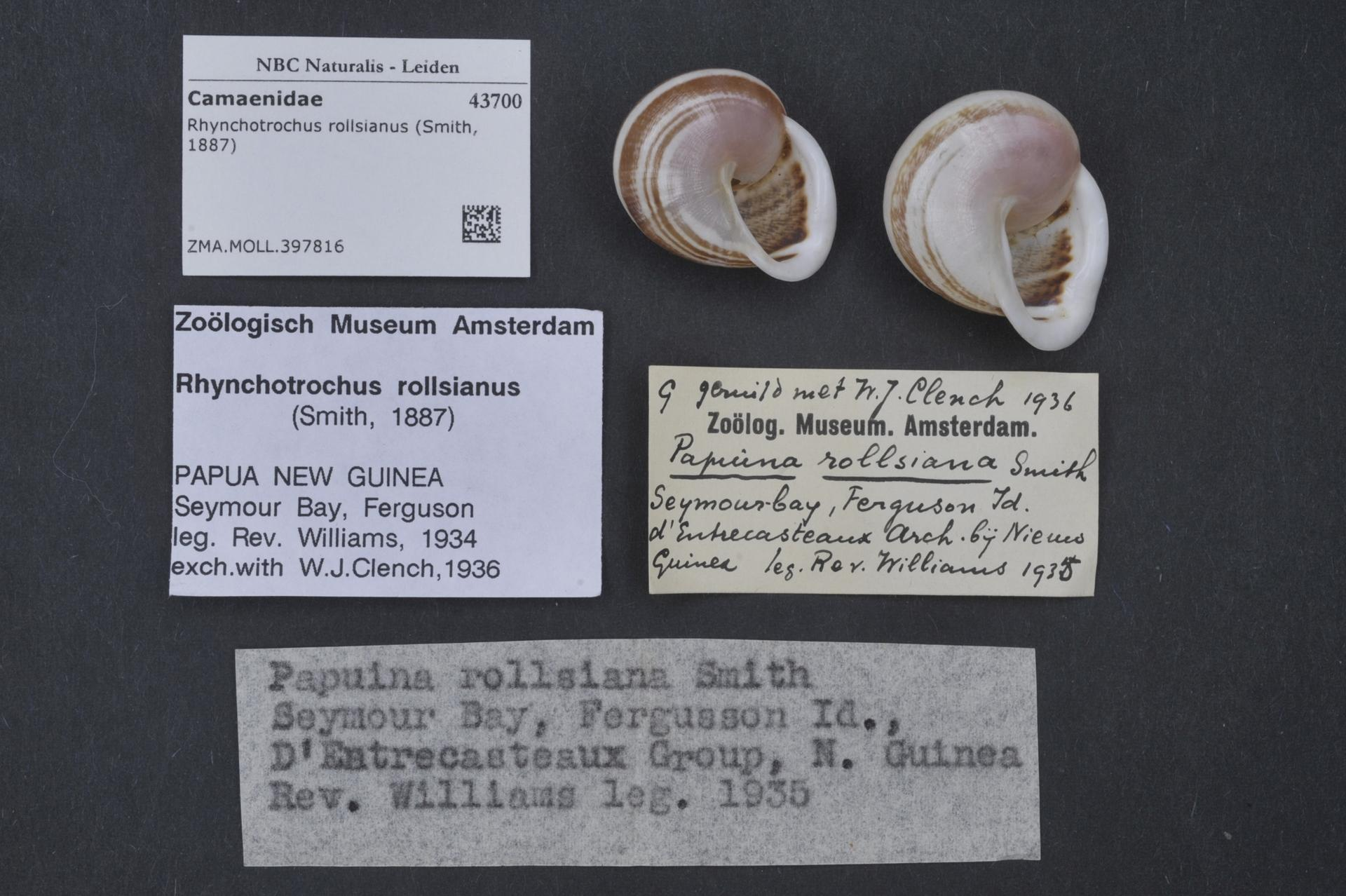
