= Normanby Island (Papua New Guinea) =

Island in Papua New Guinea

Normanby
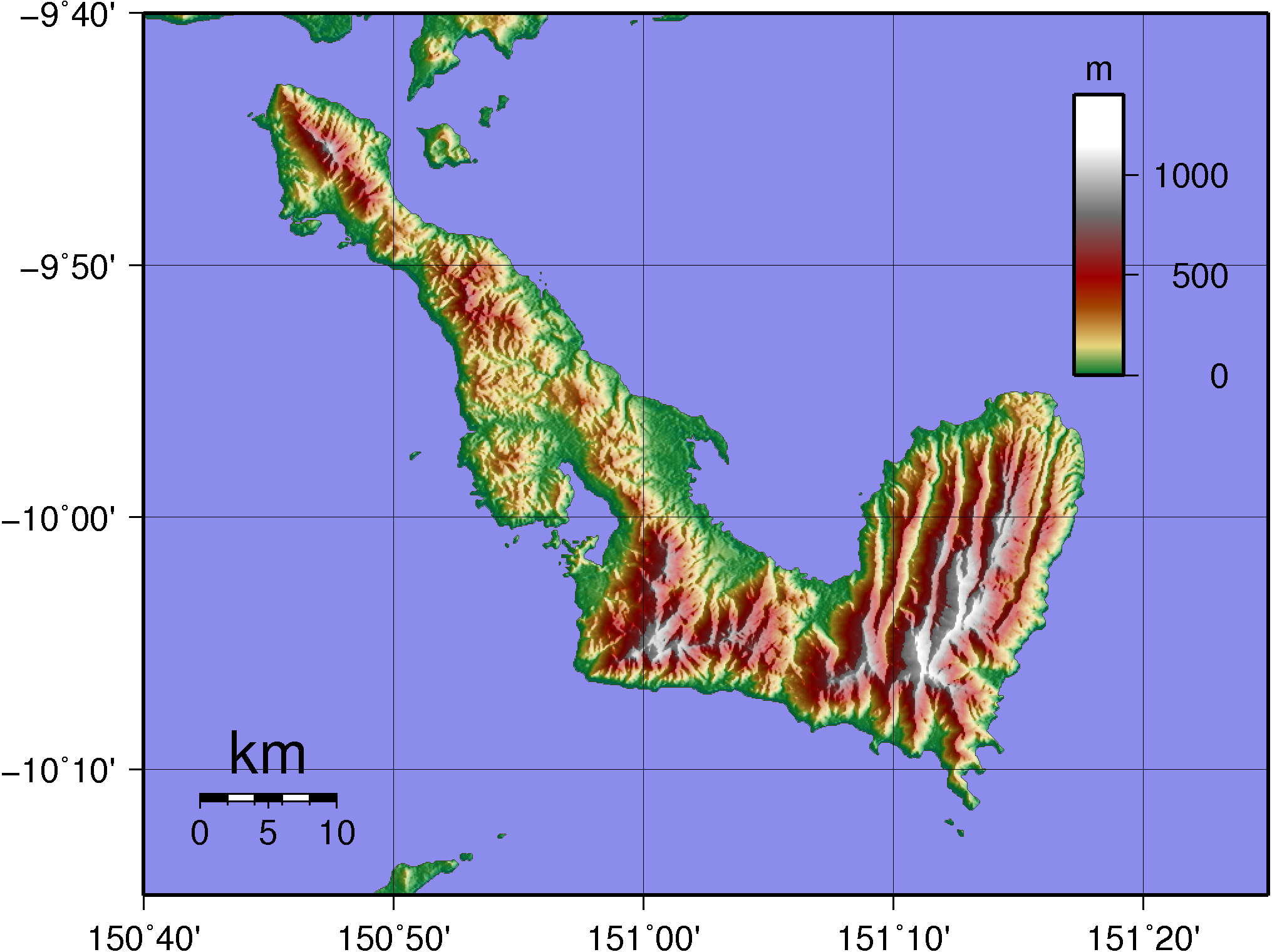
- Topographic map of Normanby Island

- Location within Papua New Guinea

Geography
- Coordinates: 10°S 151°E
- Archipelago: D'Entrecasteaux Islands
- Area: 1,000 km^{2} (390 sq mi)
- Highest elevation: 1,158 m (3799 ft)
- Highest point: Prevost Range

Administration
- Papua New Guinea
- Province: Milne Bay Province
- Largest settlement: Esa’ala

Normanby Island is a volcanic, 1,000-square-kilometre (390 sq mi), L-shaped and mountainous island, as well as the southernmost island in the D'Entrecasteaux Islands group. It is part of Milne Bay Province, Papua New Guinea. The island has an irregular and elongated shape measuring 73km in length (northwest-southeast).

Normanby Island is 16 km (10 mi) north-east of East Cape, on the island of New Guinea, separated by Goschen Strait, and is separated by the Dawson Strait (Dobu Passage) from Fergusson Island. It is also separated from Dobu Island, a smaller volcanic island, by a passage approximately 2.5 km wide. The island rises to 1,158 m (3,799 ft) in the Prevost Range in the southeast. The terrain includes low coastal plains and swamplands, high mountains and steep coastal slopes. Sewa Bay provides shelter on the west coast and Awaiara (Sewataitai) Bay on the east coast. The largest settlement, and the capital of the Esa'ala District, is Esa’ala at the island's northern end, which has a total of approximately 500 homes, residences, and structures.

The island currently has 2 main airports that allow travel to and from the island, those being Esa'ala Airport (ESA) and Sehulea Airport (AYSL). The Esa'ala Airport has one dirt runway that is 1.36 km long (4,470 ft) and 60m (190ft) wide. The Sehulea Airport also has one unpaved runway, which is 830m (2,728ft) long and around 50m (170ft) wide.

In 1873, the island was visited by British Captain John Moresby, commanding HMS Basilisk, who named it after the Marquess of Normanby, George Augustus Constantine Phipps, a governor of Queensland, Australia.

Once known to produce gold, Normanby now exports copra and some timber. Recent discoveries of gold deposits during the 21st century have begun to be exploited.

Normanby Island is also a tourist destination, with many tourist trips and cruises going past the island to allow tourists to view the scenery, nature and wildlife on the island.

== Economy ==
Normanby Island's income comes from three main sources, tourism, gold mining, and the copra/timber industry. Gold mining activities on the island have recently made a comeback after a Canadian mining company named "PNG Gold Corp" (PGK) discovered large amounts of gold while drilling at the Imwauna Project Site, which is located on the southern, mountainous side of the island in the middle of the Prevost Range.

== Local population ==
Normanby Island's inhabitants live in small communities spread out across the island. The location has been inhabited for thousands of years, and most of the individuals living on the island are indigenous peoples whose families have lived there for generations.

There are at least 25 settlements on the island with more than 5 houses, with hundreds more small huts and farms scattered around the terrain. The two main settlements with the largest number of inhabitants on the island are Esa'ala on the northern side of the island followed by Sehulea on the south-eastern side of the island. The majority of the structures in both settlements are wooden huts made from nearby trees around the building. Most of the local population live along the shoreline, in small, raised wood huts and in small close-knit communities.

The island's inhabitants are involved in the Kula exchange, an exchange of goods between islands in the Massim archipelago that involves thousands of individuals who travel hundreds of miles by canoe to exchange Kula valuables. They speak the Austronesian language known as Duau.
