= Pyrausta ignealis =

Scientific classification
- Kingdom: Animalia
- Phylum: Arthropoda
- Class: Insecta
- Order: Lepidoptera
- Family: Crambidae
- Genus: Pyrausta
- Species: P. ignealis

Binomial name
- Pyrausta ignealis (Hampson, 1899)

Synonyms
- Noorda ignealis Hampson, 1899; Noorda pyrsodes Turner, 1937

Species of moth

Pyrausta ignealis is a moth in the family Crambidae. It was described by George Hampson in 1899. It is found on New Guinea (Fergusson Island) and Australia, where it has been recorded from Queensland.
