= Strepsinoma ectopalis =

Scientific classification
- Kingdom: Animalia
- Phylum: Arthropoda
- Class: Insecta
- Order: Lepidoptera
- Family: Crambidae
- Genus: Strepsinoma
- Species: S. ectopalis

Binomial name
- Strepsinoma ectopalis Hampson, 1897

Species of moth

Strepsinoma ectopalis is a moth in the family Crambidae. It was described by George Hampson in 1897. It is found on Fergusson Island in Papua New Guinea.
