= Syllepte ochritinctalis =

Scientific classification
- Kingdom: Animalia
- Phylum: Arthropoda
- Class: Insecta
- Order: Lepidoptera
- Family: Crambidae
- Genus: Syllepte
- Species: S. ochritinctalis

Binomial name
- Syllepte ochritinctalis (Hampson, 1918)

Synonyms
- Sylepta ochritinctalis Hampson, 1918

Species of moth

Syllepte ochritinctalis is a moth in the family Crambidae. It is found in Papua New Guinea, where it has been recorded from the D'Entrecasteaux Islands (Fergusson Island).
