= Teldenia nigrinotata =

Scientific classification
- Domain: Eukaryota
- Kingdom: Animalia
- Phylum: Arthropoda
- Class: Insecta
- Order: Lepidoptera
- Family: Drepanidae
- Genus: Teldenia
- Species: T. nigrinotata

Binomial name
- Teldenia nigrinotata Warren, 1896

Species of hook-tip moth

Teldenia nigrinotata is a moth in the family Drepanidae. It was described by Warren in 1896. It is found on Fergusson Island and in New Guinea and possibly Australia.
