= Catapsephis apicipuncta =

Scientific classification
- Kingdom: Animalia
- Phylum: Arthropoda
- Class: Insecta
- Order: Lepidoptera
- Family: Crambidae
- Genus: Catapsephis
- Species: C. apicipuncta

Binomial name
- Catapsephis apicipuncta Hampson, 1899

Species of moth

Catapsephis apicipuncta is a moth in the family Crambidae. It was described by George Hampson in 1899. It is found in New Guinea, where it has been recorded from Fergusson Island.
