= Dobu Island =

Island in Papua New Guinea

Dobu
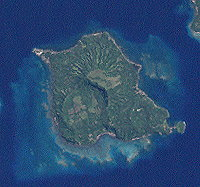
- Satellite image of Dobu

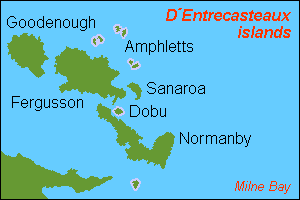
- Location of Dobu Island within D'Entrecasteaux Islands

- Location within Papua New Guinea

Geography
- Coordinates: 9°46′0″S 150°52′59″E
- Archipelago: D'Entrecasteaux Islands
- Adjacent to: Solomon Sea

Administration
- Papua New Guinea
- Province: Milne Bay Province

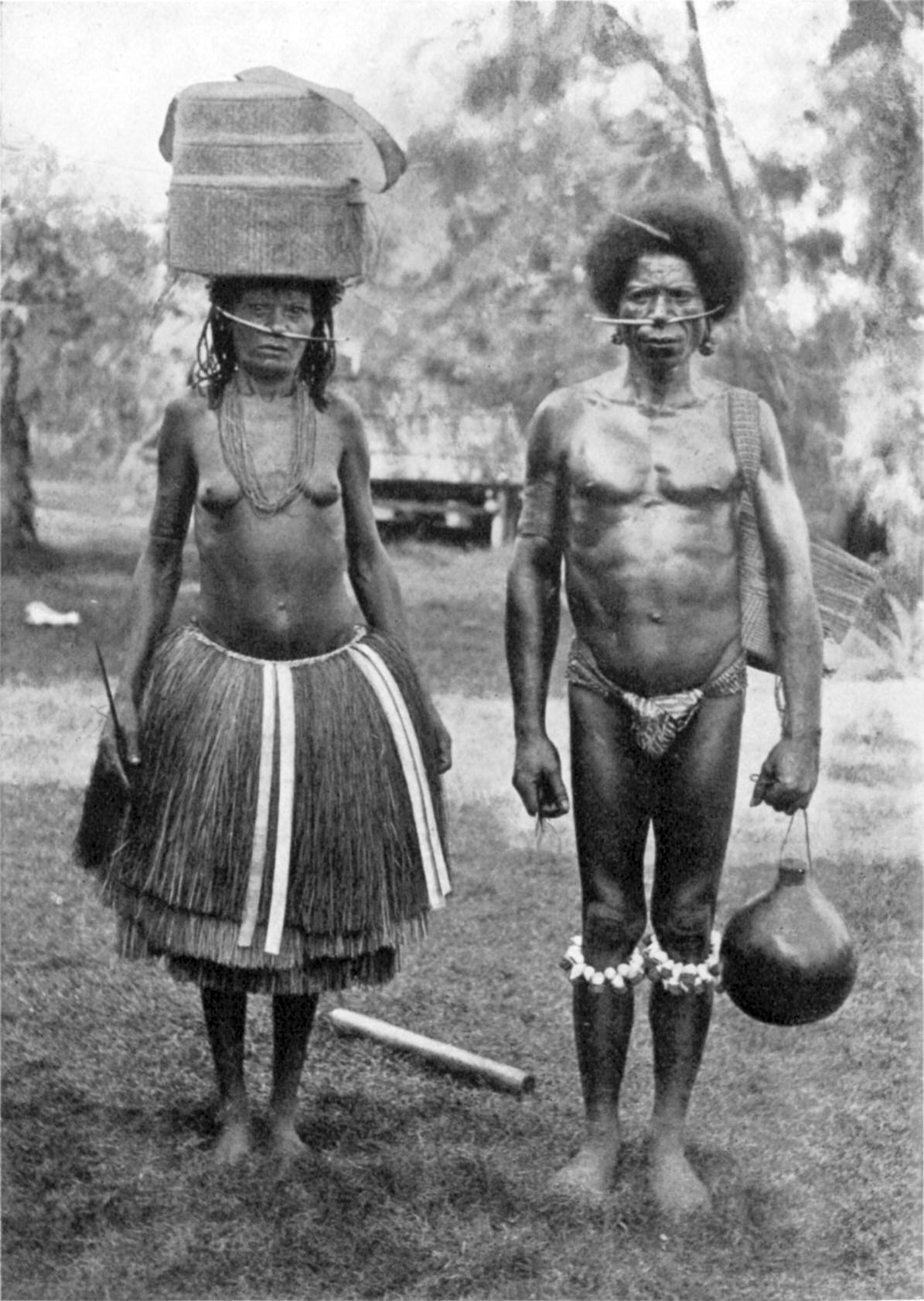
Chief Gaganamole and his wife on Dobu at the turn of the 20th century. Picture by George Brown

Dobu Island (called Goulvain Island on early maps and also known as Watoa Island), is an extinct volcano, part of D'Entrecasteaux Islands in Papua New Guinea (PNG). It is located in Dawson Strait, south of Fergusson Island and north of Normanby Island. It is currently administered by Dobu Rural LLG. The people speak the Dobu language, which is shared with the neighbouring islands in the D'Entrecasteaux group. The island has a long history of trading with nearby islands and with the Trobriand Islands to the north and Milne Bay to the south as part of the kula ring ceremonial exchange system. First contact with Europeans was established in the mid-nineteenth with visits by whalers and pearlers, and later, in 1884, by blackbirders who forcibly recruited some men and killed those who resisted. They were followed by copra traders and in 1891 by missionaries.

The natural vegetation is lowland rain forest. The region is tropical with two main seasons: the southeasterly winds from May to November, and the northwest monsoon from December to April, which brings heavy squalls. Average annual rainfall is about 254 centimeters, with occasional droughts. The population of Dobu Rural LLG in the 2011 national census was 22,781, but this includes people living on other islands. Communities are organized into village clusters, each of which was contained a number of smaller villages, usually constructed as an inward-facing circle of houses. Villages are surrounded by coconut, betel, and other fruit trees. Houses are traditionally constructed with a steeply pitched roof and are built on piles. The island has mainly a subsistence economy. The main crop is the yam, with other important crops being bananas, taro, sago, sweet potatoes and coconuts. Fishing is an important subsistence activity, and there is some hunting in forested areas. Copra provides a limited source of income.

The people of Dobu, who have a matrilineal lineage system, were the subject of a seminal anthropological study by Reo Fortune. He described the Dobuan character as "paranoid", obsessed with black magic, and as having extremely unusual attitudes toward sex and violence. Fortune's account was reiterated by Ruth Benedict in her popular work Patterns of Culture. However, many later anthropologists expressed skepticism. Fortune's analysis was significantly challenged by Susanne Kuehling in her 2005 title Dobu: Ethics of Exchange on a Massim Island, Papua New Guinea. In particular, Kuehling's interest lies at the intersection of ethics and personal conduct.

== Sources ==
- Benedict, Ruth (1934). Patterns of Culture. New York: Houghton Mifflin.
- Fortune, Reo (1932, repr. 1963). Sorcerers of Dobu: the social anthropology of the Dobu Islanders of the Western Pacific. London: Routledge and Kegan Paul.
- Kuehling, Susanne (2005). Dobu: Ethics of Exchange on a Massim Island, Papua New Guinea. Honolulu: University of Hawaii Press.
