= GVS =

GVS may refer to:

- Galvanic vestibular stimulation, medical procedure, applying electrical current to the inner ear
- Belfast Great Victoria Street railway station, Northern Ireland
- Great Vowel Shift in the pronunciation of English
- Gumawana language, of the Amphlett Islands of Papua New Guinea
- Yugo GVS, an automobile
