= Strepsinoma albiplagialis =

Scientific classification
- Domain: Eukaryota
- Kingdom: Animalia
- Phylum: Arthropoda
- Class: Insecta
- Order: Lepidoptera
- Family: Crambidae
- Genus: Strepsinoma
- Species: S. albiplagialis

Binomial name
- Strepsinoma albiplagialis Rothschild, 1915

Species of moth

Strepsinoma albiplagialis is a moth in the family Crambidae. It was described by Walter Rothschild in 1915. It is found in New Guinea.

Its wingspan is about 20mm.
