= Inalienable possessions =

Inalienable possessions (or immovable property) are things such as land or objects that are symbolically identified with the groups that own them and so cannot be permanently severed from them. Landed estates in the Middle Ages, for example, had to remain intact and even if sold, they could be reclaimed by blood kin. As a legal classification, inalienable possessions date back to Roman times. According to Barbara Mills, "Inalienable possessions are objects made to be kept (not exchanged), have symbolic and economic power that cannot be transferred, and are often used to authenticate the ritual authority of corporate groups".

Marcel Mauss first described inalienable possessions in The Gift, discussing potlatches, a kind of gift-giving feast held in communities of many indigenous peoples of the Pacific Northwest:

It is even incorrect to speak in these cases of transfer. They are loans rather than sales or true abandonment of possessions. Among the Kwakiutl a certain number of objects, although they appear at the potlatch, cannot be disposed of. In reality these pieces of "property" are sacra that a family divests itself of only with great reluctance and sometimes never.

Annette Weiner broadened the application of the category of property outside the European context with her book Inalienable Possessions: The Paradox of Keeping-While-Giving, focusing on a range of Oceanic societies from Polynesia to Papua New Guinea and testing existing theories of reciprocity and marriage exchange. She also applies the concept to explain examples such as the Kula ring in the Trobriand Islands, which was made famous by Bronisław Malinowski. She explores how such possessions enable hierarchy by establishing a source of lasting social difference. She also describes practices of loaning inalienable possessions as a way of either "temporarily making kin of non-kin" or garnering status.

== Inalienable Possessions: The Paradox of Keeping-While-Giving ==
Inalienable Possessions: The Paradox of Keeping-While-Giving is a book by anthropologist Annette Weiner. Weiner was a Professor of Anthropology and Dean of the Graduate School of Arts at New York University, and served as president of the American Anthropological Association. She died in 1997.

The book focuses on a range of Oceanic societies from Polynesia to Papua New Guinea to test existing theories of reciprocity (gift-giving) and marriage exchange. The book is also important for introducing a consideration of gender in the gift-giving debate by placing women at the heart of the political process. She finds inalienable possessions at the root of many Polynesian kingdoms, such as Hawaii and Samoa. She also credits the original idea of "inalienable possessions" to Mauss, who classified two categories of goods in Samoa, Oloa and le'Tonga─immovable and movable goods exchanged through marriage.

Barbara Mills praised her investigation of how "inalienable possessions are simultaneously used to construct and defeat hierarchy", saying it "opens a boxful of new theoretical and methodological tools for understanding social inequality in past and present societies."

== Cosmological authentication ==
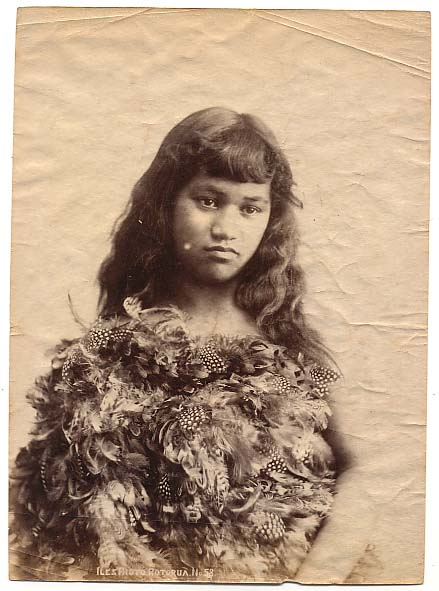
Young Maori woman wearing a high status feather cloak indicating nobility

Weiner states that certain objects become inalienable only when they have acquired "cosmological authentication"; that is,

What makes a possession inalienable is its exclusive and cumulative identity with a particular series of owners through time. Its history is authenticated by fictive or true genealogies, origin myths, sacred ancestors, and gods. In this way, inalienable possessions are transcendent treasures to be guarded against all the exigencies that might force their loss.

She gives the example of a Māori Sacred Cloak and says that when a woman wears it "she is more than herself – that she is her ancestors." Cloaks act as conduits for a person's hau or life giving spirit. The hau can bring strength or even knowledge potentially but a person may also have the risk of losing their hau. "An inalienable possession acts as a stabilizing force against change because its presence authenticates cosmological origins, kinship, and political histories." In this way, the Cloak actually stands for the person. "These possessions then are the most potent force in the effort to subvert change, while at the same time they stand as the corpus of change".

Paul Sillitoe queries the supposed identification of these objects with persons. He states that these objects are "durable wealth [that] is collective property that is continually in circulation among persons who have temporary possession of it. In this view, transactable objects belong to society as a whole and are not inalienable possessions associated with certain persons. An analogy in Western culture is sporting trophies, such as championship boxing belts owned by all the clubs comprising the association that controls the competition in which constituent club members compete, and which pass for agreed periods of time into the possession of particular champions, changing hands as new champions emerge."

Theuws argues that "Over time, objects acquire new meanings and what was once a humble pot may become a sacred vessel." This transformation in the object is the result of ritualization or a change in cosmology. In fact, "Ritual Knowledge is often a source of political power."

However, these possessions may also become destabilizing, as elites reconstruct those sacred histories to identify themselves with the past; for example, Gandhi invoked the traditional hand spinning traditional cloth, Khadi, to contest British rule, which Nehru referred to as Gandhi's "livery of freedom".

== Keeping-while-giving ==
Inalienable possessions are nonetheless frequently drawn into exchange networks. The subtitle of Weiner's book is "The paradox of keeping-while-giving"; they are given as gifts (not sold) yet still retain a tie to their owners. These gifts are not like those given in regular gift giving in the West on birthdays for example. Rather, these gifts can't be re-sold for money by the receiver because the value and the significance of the gift cannot be alienated or disengaged from its relationship to those whose inalienable possession it is.

=== Property value, obligations and rights ===
These inalienable possessions are a form of property that is inalienable, yet they can be exchanged. Property can be thought of as a bundle of rights – the right to use something, the right to collect rent from someone, the right to extract something (as in oil drilling), the right to hunt within a particular territory. That ownership may be a bundle of rights held in common by groups of individuals or lineages. The property thus becomes impossible to separate from the group owning it. "To give in this instant means to transfer without alienating, or to use the language of the West, to give means to cede the right of use without ceding actual ownership". In other words, Weiner is contending that an economy built around the moral code of gift giving provides the giver rights over what he/she has given and in turn "subsequently benefits from a series of advantages." Thus, when one accepts a gift one also accepts that the giver now has rights over the receiver.

=== Reconfiguring exchange theory ===
Weiner begins by re-examining Mauss' explanation for the return gift, the "spirit of the gift." The "spirit of the gift" was a translation of a Maori word, hau. Weiner demonstrates that not all gifts must be returned. Only gifts that are "immoveable property" can become inalienable gifts. She further argues that inalienable possessions gain the "mana" (spirit) of their possessors, and so become associated with them. These goods are frequently produced by women, like the feather cloak above. The more prominent the woman, the more mana the object is thought to inherit. The longer the kin group can maintain the object in their possession, the more valuable it becomes; but it must also be periodically displayed to assert the group's status, and thus becomes an object of desire for outsiders.

=== The sibling incest taboo ===
Weiner argues that the role of women in the exchange of inalienable possessions has been seriously underestimated. Kinship theory as developed by Claude Lévi-Strauss, used the "sibling incest taboo" to argue that women themselves are objects of exchange between lineage groups. Men had to find women outside their kin groups to marry hence they "lost" their sisters in order to gain wives. Weiner shows that the focus on women as wives ignores the importance of women as sisters (who are not "lost" as a result of becoming wives). Women produce inalienable possessions which they may take with them when they marry out; the inalienable possession, however, must be reclaimed by her brother after her death in order to maintain the status of the kin group. In comparing Hawaii, Samoa and the Trobriands, she argues that the more stratified a society is by ranked differences, the more important inalienable possessions produced by sisters become. The more stratified a society becomes (as in Hawaii), the closer the sibling bond ("sibling intimacy"). In these cases, women are critical to the "cosmological authentication" of inalienable possessions.

=== The defeat of hierarchy ===
A critical part of Weiner's argument is that the ability to keep inalienable possessions outside of exchange is a source of difference, and hence brings high status. The development of Polynesian kingdoms is an example. She points to the inalienable possessions of the Australian aborigines, however, to demonstrate how the creation of hierarchy can be defeated. Australian inalienable possessions are given cosmological authentication through their religious beliefs in the Dreaming.

As an ideology, The Dreaming is immaterial but in another sense, The Dreaming flourishes because it consists of material and verbal possessions—myths, names, songs, ceremonies, and sacred objects inherited from one generation to the next. In this way, The Dreaming itself encompasses vast inalienable possessions that are authenticated by the very cosmology under which they are produced. These possessions created in and authenticated by The Dreaming circulate from one person or group to another in a limited way. The possibilities of transmission in the face of the canon for guardianship establish for ritual leaders a domain of authority that in certain situations leads to a formalized position of rank.

Weiner points out that the same gender relations of "sibling intimacy" affect the exchange of these inalienable objects. Women as sisters and women as wives provide the conduit for the gifting and return gifting of these goods, allowing the givers to build prestige. However, insofar as these inalienable possessions lose their cosmological authentication, these social hierarchies lose intergenerational longevity. Because the Dreaming itself is an inalienable possession kept secret by clan elders, it can be lost and hierarchy defeated.

=== The paradox of keeping-while-giving ===
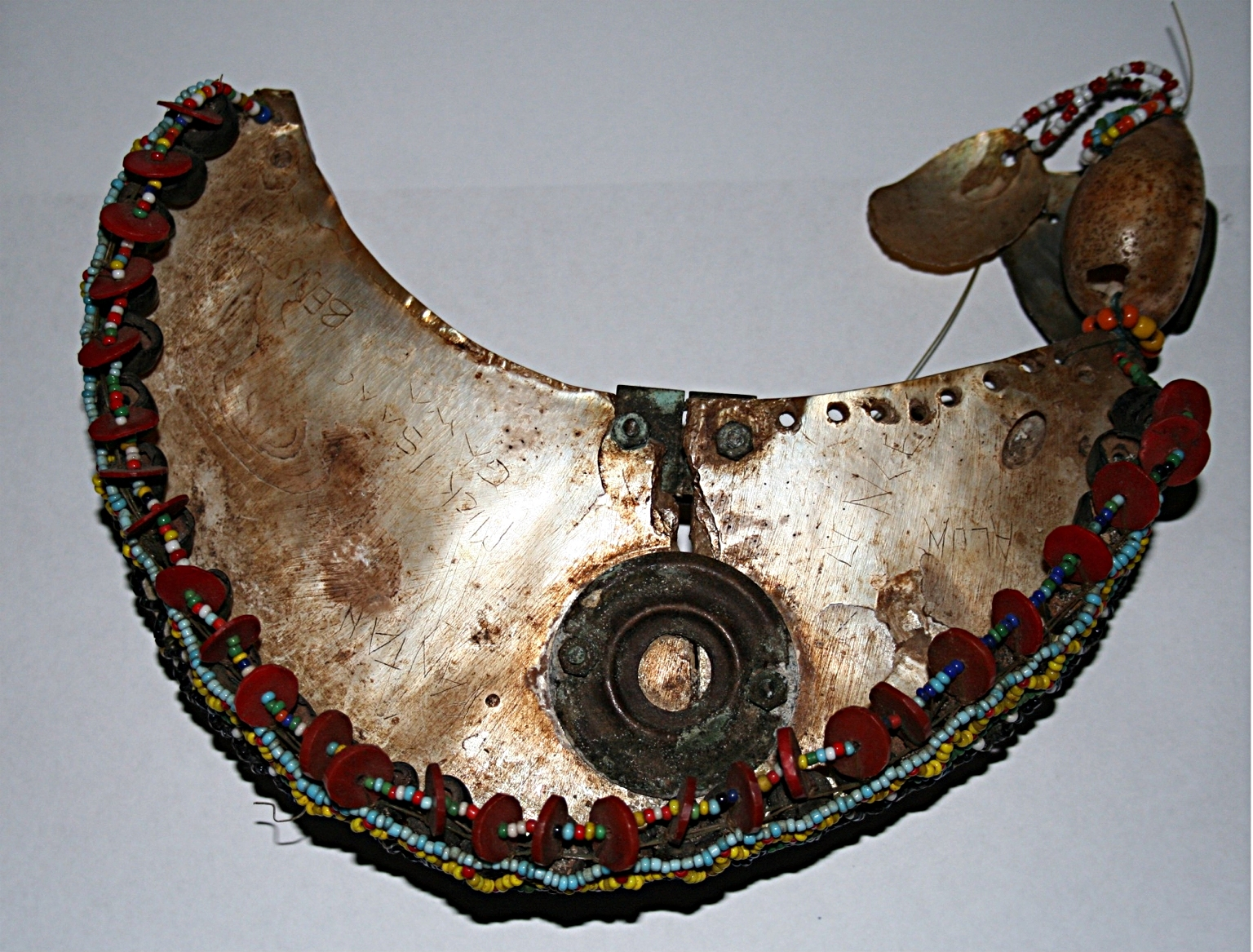
A Kula bracelet from the Trobriand Islands.

Weiner has used the term to categorize the many Kula valuables of the Trobriand islanders who view those objects as culturally imbued with a spiritual sense of the gift giver. Thus, when they are transferred from one individual or group to another the objects reserve meaningful bonds associated with that of the giver and their lineage. The shell bracelets and necklaces given in exchange each have their own histories, and are thus ranked on the basis of who they have been exchanged to. There were, as well, less well known shells called kitomu which were individually owned (rather than being part of lineage history), which would be given to temporarily please a disappointed trade partner expecting a more valuable shell.

The Kula trade was organized differently in the more hierarchical parts of the Trobriand islands. There, only chiefs were allowed to engage in Kula exchange. In hierarchical areas, individuals can earn their own kitomu shells, whereas in less hierarchical areas, they are always subject to the claims of matrilineal kin. And lastly, in the hierarchical areas, Kula necklaces and bracelets are saved for external exchange only; stone axe blades are used internally. In less hierarchical areas, exchange partners may lose their valuables to internal claims. As a result, most seek to exchange their kula valuables with chiefs, who thus become the most successful players. The chiefs have saved their Kula valuables for external trade, and external traders seek to trade with them before they lose their valuables to internal claims.

Kula exchange is the only way for an individual to achieve local prestige without local political action. But this prestige is fleeting and does not transform into permanent differences in rank because women's participation is minor and Kula shells lack cosmological authentication. It is not Kula shells but women's cloth wealth that is connected with matrilineal ancestors. It is for this reason that women retain high prestige and authority despite the fame of male Kula exchange players.

== Godelier on keeping-for-giving and giving-for-keeping ==
Maurice Godelier has further elaborated on Annette Weiner's ideas on inalienable possessions in The Enigma of the Gift. He derived two theses from Weiner, to which he adds a third.

First Thesis: As discussed above, even in a society that is dominated by a gift-giving economic and moral code, the interplay of gift and counter-gift doesn't completely dominate the social sphere, as there must be some objects which are kept and not given. These things, such as valuables, talismans, knowledge, and rites, confirm identities and their continuity over time. Moreover, they acknowledge differences of identity of individuals or groups linked by various kinds of exchanges.

Second Thesis: Women or the feminine element also exercise power by providing legitimation and redistributing of political and religious power among groups in a society. Godelier contends that Weiner refocuses attention on the role of women in constructing and legitimizing power. While women, as wives, are frequently lowered in status, as sisters, they frequently retain equal status to their brothers. For example, in Polynesia, the woman as a sister appears to control those goods associated with the sacred, the ancestors, and the gods.

To this, Godelier adds a third thesis.

Third thesis: The social is not just the sum of alienable and inalienable goods, but is brought into existence by the difference and inter-dependence of these two spheres of exchange. Maintaining society thus requires not keeping-while-giving, but "keeping-for-giving and giving-for-keeping."

== Related anthropologists on exchange theory ==
- Emile Durkheim "describes how exchange involves an intensive bonding more formidable than mere economic relations. Social cohesiveness occurs because one person is always dependent on another to achieve a feeling of completeness". This comes into being via the domain of the sacred ritual that involves communal participation even as it encompasses the moment in a higher order of sacredness.
- Bronisław Malinowski wrote Argonauts of the Western Pacific. Malinowski was a pioneer of ethnographic fieldwork in the Trobriand Islandes and researched Kula exchange. His work was later re-analyzed by Mauss and subsequently by other anthropologists.
- Marcel Mauss wrote The Gift. He was a pioneer in the study of gift exchange. Mauss was concerned only with the relations formed by the circulation of things that men produce, and not with the relations that men form while they produce things. He is concerned, in particular, with why people give gifts, and why they feel the obligation to make a return. In fact, he contended that inalienability is based on or legitimized by the belief that there is present in the object a power, a spirit, a spiritual reality that binds it to the giver, and which accompanies the object wherever it goes. This spirit then wishes to return to its source the original giver.
- Marshall Sahlins wrote Stone Age Economics. Sahlins disagreed with Mauss on several points and contended that "the freedom to gain at others' expense is not envisioned by the relations and forms of exchange." Moreover, "The material flow underwrites or initiates social relations…. Persons and groups confront each other not merely as distinct interests but with the possible inclination and certain right to physically prosecute these interests."
- Claude Lévi-Strauss applauded Marcel Mauss for his efforts even as he criticized him of not perceiving that "the primary fundamental phenomena (of social life) is exchange itself." He believed that "society is better understood in terms of language than from the standpoint of any other paradigm." Moreover, he thought that anthropologists and ethnographers, particularly Mauss, were becoming confused by the languages of those they ethnographically studied, resulting in obscure theories that didn't really make sense. He advocated structuralist analysis in an attempt to clear up certain confusions caused by Mauss' work.
- Maurice Godelier wrote The Enigma of the Gift. Godelier expanded on Weiner's work by maintaining that society requires not keeping-while-giving, but "keeping-for-giving and giving-for-keeping."

== Importance ==
Economists have often shunned the idea of pondering exactly why people want goods. Goods serve many purposes beyond what classical economists might theorize. Goods can serve as systems of social communication according to Mary Douglas, a prominent anthropologist. In fact, anthropology in general is important to economics because it talks about the socio-cultural relationships in economy and economy itself as a cultural system that is not just market-based. Moreover, entire industries are often based on gift giving such as the pharmaceutical industry. In addition, gift-giving plays an important role in the cultural development of how social and business relations evolve in major economies such as in the case of the Chinese.

The concept has also been applied to objects in works of fiction, such as the One Ring in The Lord of the Rings.
