= Teldenia moniliata =

Scientific classification
- Domain: Eukaryota
- Kingdom: Animalia
- Phylum: Arthropoda
- Class: Insecta
- Order: Lepidoptera
- Family: Drepanidae
- Genus: Teldenia
- Species: T. moniliata

Binomial name
- Teldenia moniliata Warren, 1902

Species of hook-tip moth

Teldenia moniliata is a moth in the family Drepanidae. It was described by Warren in 1902. It is found on the Solomon Islands.

The length of the forewings is about 10 mm for males and about 11 mm for females.
