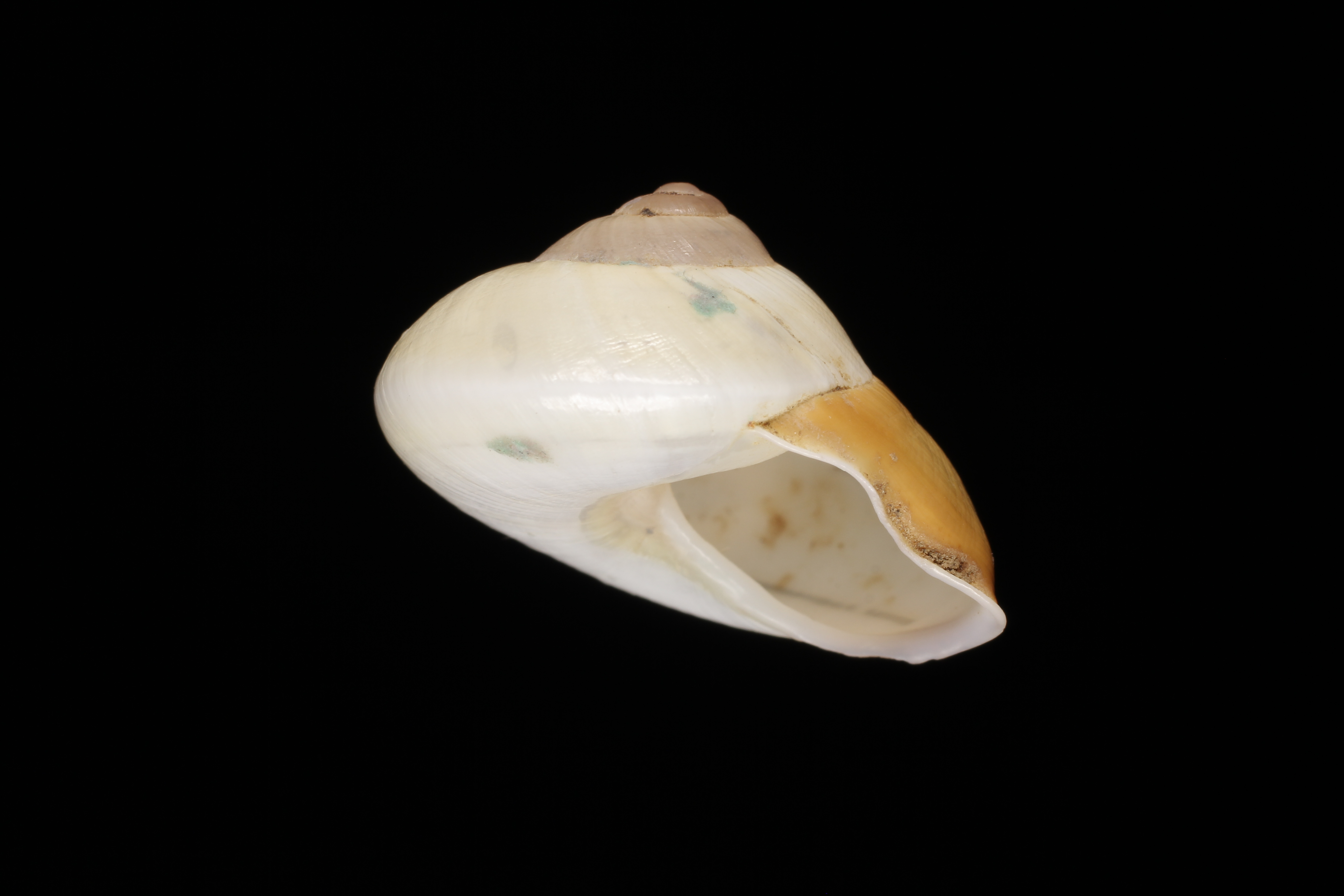
- Shell of Rhynchotrochus kubaryi abbasi (holotype at MNHN, Paris)

Scientific classification
- Kingdom: Animalia
- Phylum: Mollusca
- Class: Gastropoda
- Order: Stylommatophora
- Superfamily: Helicoidea
- Family: Camaenidae
- Subfamily: Hadrinae
- Genus: Rhynchotrochus; Möllendorff, 1895

Type species
- Papuina tayloriana (A. Adams & Reeve, 1850)

Synonyms
- Henga Iredale, 1941; Kathadena Iredale, 1941; Pompalabia Iredale, 1941; Rhynchotrochus (Pompalabia) Iredale, 1941· accepted, alternate representation; Rhynchotrochus (Rhynchotrochus) Möllendorff, 1895· accepted, alternate representation; Violenga Iredale, 1941

= Rhynchotrochus =

Genus of gastropods

Rhynchotrochus is a genus of air-breathing land snails, terrestrial pulmonate gastropod mollusks in the subfamily Hadrinae of the family Camaenidae.

== Species ==
- Rhynchotrochus albocarinatus (E. A. Smith, 1887)
- Rhynchotrochus gorenduensis (Brazier, 1886)
- Rhynchotrochus grata (Michelin, 1831)
- Rhynchotrochus gurgustii (Cox, 1879)
- Rhynchotrochus jucundus (Fulton, 1902)
- Rhynchotrochus kubaryi (Möllendorff, 1895)
- Rhynchotrochus louisiadensis (Forbes, 1852)
- Rhynchotrochus macgillivrayi (Forbes, 1852)
- Rhynchotrochus meekianus (E. A. Smith, 1905)
- Rhynchotrochus misima (Iredale, 1941)
- Rhynchotrochus naso (Martens, 1883)
- Rhynchotrochus rhombostomus (L. Pfeiffer, 1845)
- Rhynchotrochus rhynchotus (Boettger, 1918)
- Rhynchotrochus rollsianus (E. A. Smith, 1887)
- Rhynchotrochus siglerae Thach, 2018
- Rhynchotrochus strabo (Brazier, 1876)
- Rhynchotrochus taylorianus (A. Adams & Reeve, 1850)
- Rhynchotrochus wiegmanni (Martens, 1894)
- Rhynchotrochus williamsi (Clench & Archer, 1936)
- Rhynchotrochus woodlarkianus (Souverbie, 1863)
- Rhynchotrochus yulensis (Brazier, 1876)
