= Teldenia nivea =

Scientific classification
- Domain: Eukaryota
- Kingdom: Animalia
- Phylum: Arthropoda
- Class: Insecta
- Order: Lepidoptera
- Family: Drepanidae
- Genus: Teldenia
- Species: T. nivea

Binomial name
- Teldenia nivea Butler, 1887

Species of hook-tip moth

Teldenia nivea is a moth in the family Drepanidae. It was described by Arthur Gardiner Butler in 1887. It is found on the Solomon Islands.

The length of the forewings is 12–13 mm.
