= Teldenia ruficosta =

Scientific classification
- Domain: Eukaryota
- Kingdom: Animalia
- Phylum: Arthropoda
- Class: Insecta
- Order: Lepidoptera
- Family: Drepanidae
- Genus: Teldenia
- Species: T. ruficosta

Binomial name
- Teldenia ruficosta Warren, 1922

Species of hook-tip moth

Teldenia ruficosta is a moth in the family Drepanidae. It was described by Warren in 1922. It is found in West Papua.

The length of the forewings is about 15 mm for males and 15.5-16.5 mm for females.
