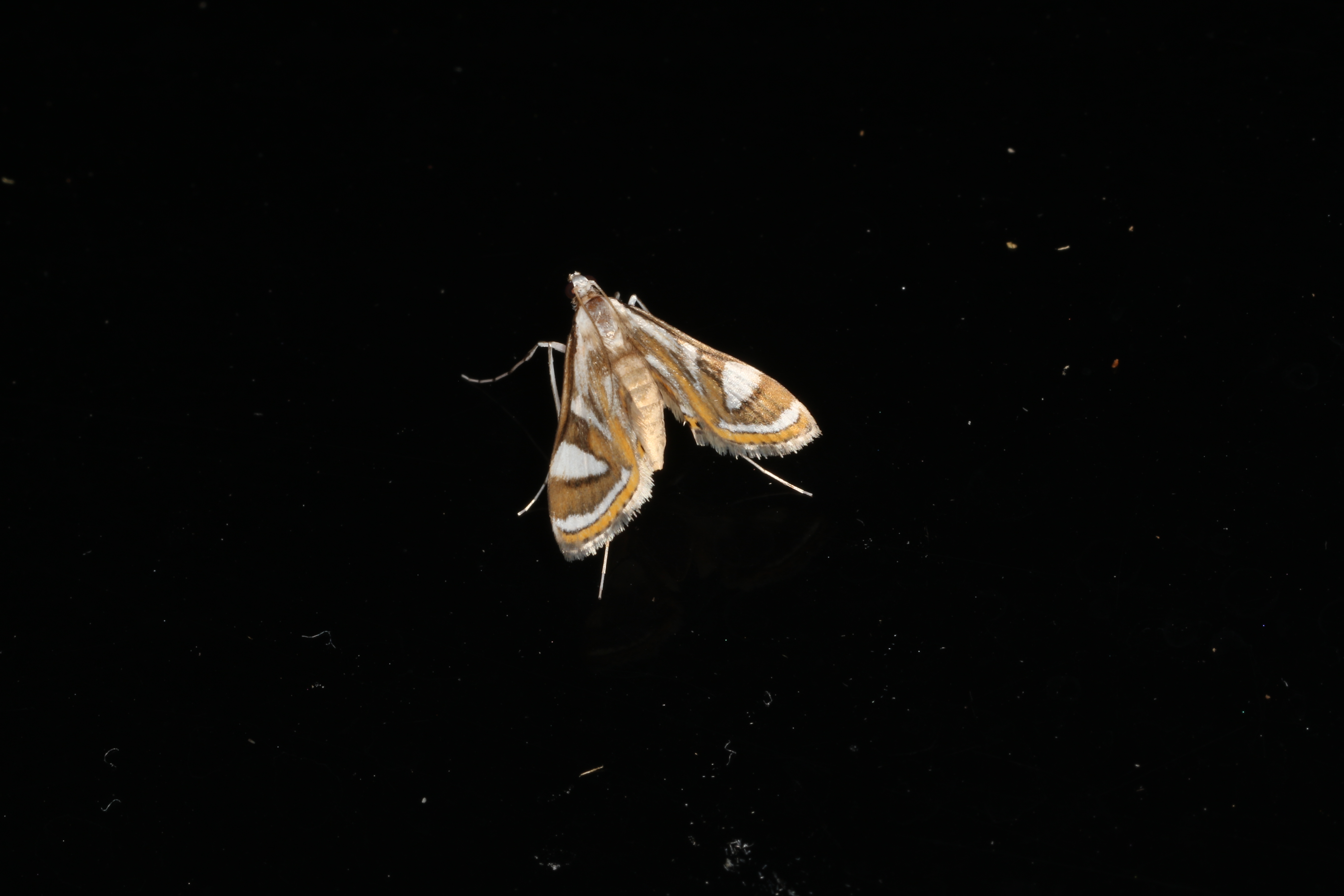
- Strepsinoma foveata

Scientific classification
- Domain: Eukaryota
- Kingdom: Animalia
- Phylum: Arthropoda
- Class: Insecta
- Order: Lepidoptera
- Family: Crambidae
- Genus: Strepsinoma
- Species: S. foveata

Binomial name
- Strepsinoma foveata Turner, 1937

= Strepsinoma foveata =

Species of moth

Strepsinoma foveata is a moth in the family Crambidae. It was described by Turner in 1937. It is found in Australia, where it has been recorded from New South Wales, Queensland and the Australian Capital Territory.

The wingspan is about 17 mm. The forewings have a pattern of brown and white. There is a series of black spots at the hindwing margin.
