= Strepsinoma albimaculalis =

Scientific classification
- Domain: Eukaryota
- Kingdom: Animalia
- Phylum: Arthropoda
- Class: Insecta
- Order: Lepidoptera
- Family: Crambidae
- Genus: Strepsinoma
- Species: S. albimaculalis

Binomial name
- Strepsinoma albimaculalis Rothschild, 1915

Species of moth

Strepsinoma albimaculalis is a moth in the family Crambidae. It was described by Rothschild in 1915. It is found in New Guinea.

The wingspan is about 16 mm. The forewings are sooty grey-black, with a white wedge-shaped postmedian spot and a white subapical spot. The hindwings are sooty grey-black.
