= Strepsinoma sphenactis =

Scientific classification
- Kingdom: Animalia
- Phylum: Arthropoda
- Class: Insecta
- Order: Lepidoptera
- Family: Crambidae
- Genus: Strepsinoma
- Species: S. sphenactis

Binomial name
- Strepsinoma sphenactis Meyrick, 1897

Species of moth

Strepsinoma sphenactis is a moth in the family Crambidae. It was described by Edward Meyrick in 1897. It is found on the Sangihe Islands in northern Indonesia.
