= Teldenia seriata =

Scientific classification
- Domain: Eukaryota
- Kingdom: Animalia
- Phylum: Arthropoda
- Class: Insecta
- Order: Lepidoptera
- Family: Drepanidae
- Genus: Teldenia
- Species: T. seriata

Binomial name
- Teldenia seriata Warren, 1922

Species of hook-tip moth

Teldenia seriata is a moth in the family Drepanidae. Warren described it in 1922. It is found in New Guinea and on Goodenough Island.
