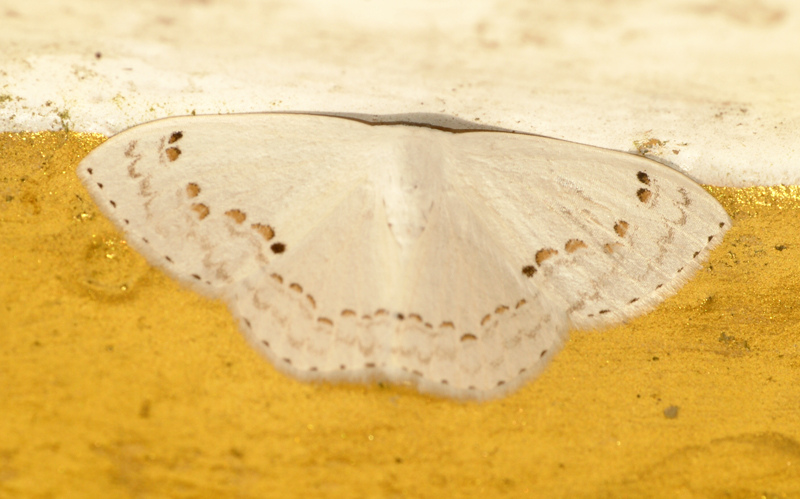
- Teldenia specca

Scientific classification
- Kingdom: Animalia
- Phylum: Arthropoda
- Clade: Pancrustacea
- Class: Insecta
- Order: Lepidoptera
- Family: Drepanidae
- Subfamily: Drepaninae
- Genus: Teldenia; Moore, [1883]

= Teldenia =

Moth genus in family Drepanidae

Teldenia is a genus of moths belonging to the subfamily Drepaninae.

== Species ==
- species group niveata:
  - Teldenia alba Moore, 1882
  - Teldenia niveata Pagenstecher, 1896
  - Teldenia obsoleta Warren, 1896
  - Teldenia specca Wilkinson, 1967
  - Teldenia vestigiata Butler, 1880
- species group nigrinotata:
  - Teldenia apata Wilkinson, 1967
  - Teldenia aurilinea Warren, 1922
  - Teldenia celidographia Wilkinson, 1967
  - Teldenia desma Wilkinson, 1967
  - Teldenia geminata Warren, 1922
  - Teldenia helena Wilkinson, 1967
  - Teldenia illunata Warren, 1907
  - Teldenia inanis Wilkinson, 1967
  - Teldenia latilinea Watson, 1961
  - Teldenia melanosticta Wilkinson, 1967
  - Teldenia moniliata Warren, 1902
  - Teldenia nigrinotata Warren, 1896
  - Teldenia psara Wilkinson, 1967
  - Teldenia sparsata Wilkinson, 1967
- species group pura:
  - Teldenia argeta Wilkinson, 1967
  - Teldenia cathara Wilkinson, 1967
  - Teldenia nivea Butler, 1887
  - Teldenia pura Warren, 1899
  - Teldenia unistrigata Warren, 1896
- species group strigosa:
  - Teldenia ruficosta Warren, 1922
  - Teldenia seriata Warren, 1922
  - Teldenia strigosa Warren, 1903
  - Teldenia subpura Rothschild, 1915
- Unplaced:
  - Teldenia apoe Expósito-Hermosa, 2025
  - Teldenia buruanae Expósito-Hermosa, 2025

== Former species ==
- Teldenia fulvilunata Warren, 1897
