= Teldenia unistrigata =

Scientific classification
- Domain: Eukaryota
- Kingdom: Animalia
- Phylum: Arthropoda
- Class: Insecta
- Order: Lepidoptera
- Family: Drepanidae
- Genus: Teldenia
- Species: T. unistrigata

Binomial name
- Teldenia unistrigata Warren, 1896

Synonyms
- Teldenia unistriga Warren; Gaede, 1931

Species of hook-tip moth

Teldenia unistrigata is a species of moth in the family Drepanidae. It was described by Warren in 1896. It is found on Peninsular Malaysia, Borneo, Sumatra, the Philippines, Sulawesi and New Guinea.

The wingspan is about 20 mm (0.79 in). The forewings are white with a narrow pale ochreous costa and a curved ochreous line from two-thirds of the costa to four-fifths of the inner margin. The hindwings have the ochreous line parallel to the hindmargin at four-fifths.
