= Susanne Kuehling =

Canadian anthropologist

Susanne Kuehling is a scholar of anthropology and ethnology. She currently works at the University of Regina.

== Career ==
Kuehling is interested in the study of small matrilinear and matrilocal societies. Her research and teaching includes also the ethnography of New Guinea and Micronesia, anthropology of gender and landscape and the history of anthropology. She did undergraduate studies in Social anthropology and development sociology at the University of Göttingen and there received her Magister degree in 1989 with a thesis about Chewing betel in Melanesia. She got a stipend of the Friedrich Ebert Foundation and the Australian National University for her postgraduate studies there from 1994—1998. She conducted 18 months of fieldwork on Dobu and wrote her PhD thesis about Kula rings in this society at the in 1999. She taught for five years at University of Heidelberg before she moved to Canada in 2008. She has published a book (Dobu: Ethics of Exchange on a Massim Island, University of Hawaiʻi Press, 2005) and journal articles on kula exchange, value, personhood, morality, gender, emplacement and teaching methods. During various visits to Dobu she started a program to revitalize kula exchange there which is funded by the Canadian Social Sciences and Humanities Research Council. In 2015 she gained an award from the University of Regina for innovation in teaching

Her description of the inhabitants of Dobu differs from earlier writings of Reo Fortune and Ruth Benedict in portraying them not only as aggressive and nasty. Fortune wrote: "The Dobuans prefer to be infernally nasty or else not nasty at all", Benedict describes them as ″lawless and treacherous. Every man’s hand is against every other man.″. Kuehling questions their aggressiveness, highlights instead their poverty, marginality in the global economy and their former living as indentured laborers. The island's inhabitants, who did not know their negative portray in older studies, were quite happy about her work.

== Work ==
- The name of the gift : ethics of exchange on Dobu Island Australian National University, 1998, Download
- Dobu : ethics of exchange on a Massim Island, Papua New Guinea, Hawaii University, Honolulu, 2005
- A Fat Sow Named Skulfi: ‘Expensive’ Words in Dobu Island Society , in: Tide of Innovation in Oceania, S. 193–224, PDF file on anu.edu.au
- The Converted War Canoe: Cannibal Raiders, Missionaries and Pax Britannica on Dobu Island, Papua New Guinea, in: Anthropologica 56, 2014, S. 269–284
- Standing tall: Posture, ethics and emotions in Dobu, in: Expressions of Austronesian Thought and Emotions, Australian National University, online on anu.edu.au
- Works of Susanne Kuehling in the Bibliography of Trobiand in Depth, March 2018, p. 117—119
