= Teldenia obsoleta =

Scientific classification
- Domain: Eukaryota
- Kingdom: Animalia
- Phylum: Arthropoda
- Class: Insecta
- Order: Lepidoptera
- Family: Drepanidae
- Genus: Teldenia
- Species: T. obsoleta

Binomial name
- Teldenia obsoleta Warren, 1896

Synonyms
- Teldenia fulvilunata Warren, 1897

Species of hook-tip moth

Teldenia obsoleta is a moth in the family Drepanidae. It was described by Warren in 1896. It is found in Burma, Indonesia (Timor, Sulawesi, Bali) and the Philippines.

The wingspan is about 23 mm. The forewings are white with a pale ochreous waved line formed of small lunules near the hindmargin. There are faint traces of ochreous lunules indicating an exterior line below the costa and in the middle. The hindwings are as the forewings, but without any trace of an exterior line.
