= Teldenia subpura =

Scientific classification
- Domain: Eukaryota
- Kingdom: Animalia
- Phylum: Arthropoda
- Class: Insecta
- Order: Lepidoptera
- Family: Drepanidae
- Genus: Teldenia
- Species: T. subpura

Binomial name
- Teldenia subpura Rothschild, 1915

Synonyms
- Felderia subpura

Species of hook-tip moth

Teldenia subpura is a moth in the family Drepanidae. It was described by Rothschild in 1915. It is found in West Papua and on Obi Island and Sulawesi.

The length of the forewings is 14.5–16 mm for males and 15–17 mm for females.
