= Teldenia latilinea =

Scientific classification
- Domain: Eukaryota
- Kingdom: Animalia
- Phylum: Arthropoda
- Class: Insecta
- Order: Lepidoptera
- Family: Drepanidae
- Genus: Teldenia
- Species: T. latilinea

Binomial name
- Teldenia latilinea Watson, 1961

Species of hook-tip moth

Teldenia latilinea is a moth in the family Drepanidae. It was described by Watson in 1961. It is found on Sulawesi.
