= Teldenia aurilinea =

Scientific classification
- Kingdom: Animalia
- Phylum: Arthropoda
- Clade: Pancrustacea
- Class: Insecta
- Order: Lepidoptera
- Family: Drepanidae
- Genus: Teldenia
- Species: T. aurilinea

Binomial name
- Teldenia aurilinea Warren, 1922

Species of hook-tip moth

Teldenia aurilinea is a moth in the family Drepanidae. It was described by Warren in 1922. It is found in New Guinea, where it is only known from the Arfak Mountains.
