= Annette Weiner =

American anthropologist (1933–1997)

Annette Barbara Weiner née Cohen (February 14, 1933 - 7 December 1997) was an American anthropologist, Kriser Distinguished Professor of Anthropology, chair of the Anthropology Department, dean of the social sciences, and dean of the Graduate School of Arts and Science at New York University. She was known for her ethnographic work in the Trobriand Islands and her development of the concept of inalienable wealth in social anthropological theory.

Her dissertation studied the contribution of women to the economy of Trobriand society, which had been the site of Bronislaw Malinowski's renowned studies of the Kula exchange. She demonstrated that women's contributions were highly significant but largely erased from record because the cultural focus was on the distribution and exchange of valuables rather than its production. The dissertation was published in 1976 by University of Texas Press under the title: Women of Value, Men of Renown: New Perspectives in Trobriand Exchange. It received intense attention and became a highly influential piece of feminist anthropology. In 1992 she published the book Inalienable Possessions: The paradox of keeping-while-giving at the University of California Press, in which she built on work by Marcel Mauss and Malinowski to present a theory of value and exchange in which there is a basic distinction between alienable and inalienable forms of wealth. Inalienable wealth is a kind of possession that is inalienably tied to its original possessor and which if given away retains some part of them, such wealth has the power to create lasting social divisions.

A Guggenheim Fellow, she was also a founding member and president of the Society for Cultural Anthropology and president of the American Anthropological Association whose Distinguished Service Award she received in 1997. In her final presidential address to the AAA, "Culture and Our Discontents," Weiner argued that "a commitment to a global comparative perspective can provide an innovative postmodern frame" for the discipline.

== Publications ==
- Women of Value, Men of Renown: New Perspectives in Trobriand Exchange, 1976
- The Trobrianders of Papua New Guinea, 1987
- Cloth and human experience, 1989
- Inalienable possessions : the paradox of keeping-while-giving, 1992
