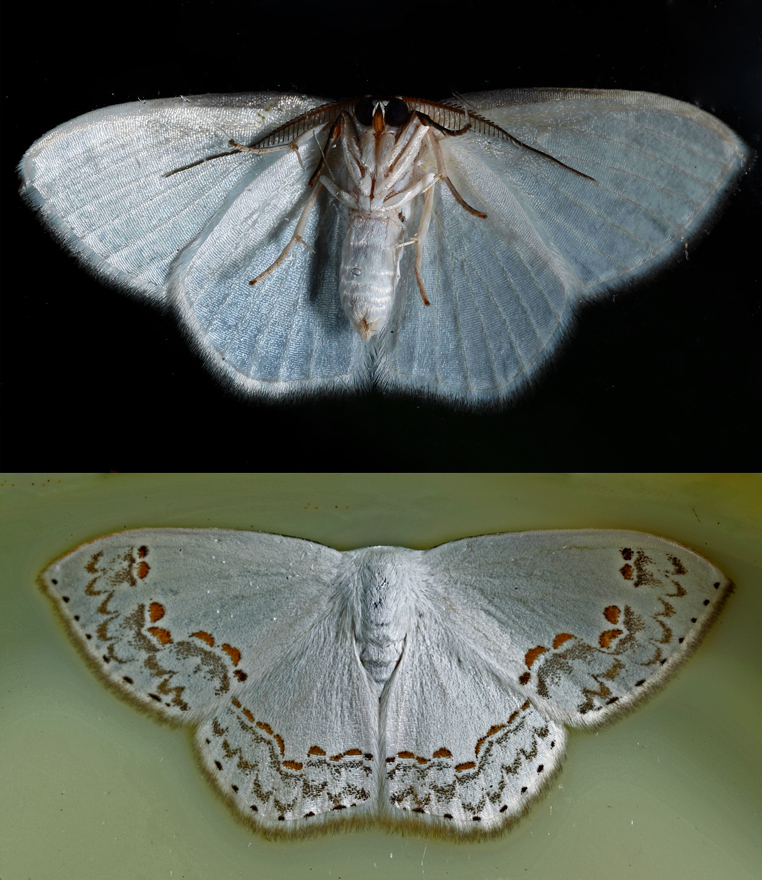

Scientific classification
- Domain: Eukaryota
- Kingdom: Animalia
- Phylum: Arthropoda
- Class: Insecta
- Order: Lepidoptera
- Family: Drepanidae
- Genus: Teldenia
- Species: T. vestigiata

Binomial name
- Teldenia vestigiata (Butler, 1880)

Synonyms
- Corycia vestigiata Butler, 1880

= Teldenia vestigiata =

Species of hook-tip moth

Teldenia vestigiata is a moth in the family Drepanidae. It was described by Arthur Gardiner Butler in 1880. It is found in India in Darjeeling, Sikkim and Kanara.
