= Gumawana language =

Austronesian language spoken in Papua New Guinea

Gumawana
- Gumasi
- Native to: Papua New Guinea
- Region: Amphlett Islands, Milne Bay Province
- Native speakers: (470 cited 2000 census)
- Language family: Austronesian: Malayo-Polynesian; Oceanic; Western Oceanic; Papuan Tip; Nuclear Papuan Tip; North Papuan Mainland – D'Entrecasteaux; Gumawana

Language codes
- ISO 639-3: gvs
- Glottolog: guma1254

Gumawana (sometimes also referred to by the exonym Gumasi) is an Austronesian language spoken by people living on the Amphlett Islands of the Milne Bay Province of Papua New Guinea.

== Classification ==
Gumawana is an Austronesian language of the North Papuan Mainland-D'Entrecasteaux branch.

== Geographic distribution ==
Gumawana is spoken by some 470 people in the small Amphlett Islands of Papua New Guinea's Milne Bay Province. The language is spoken on the four inhabited islands of the archipelago: Nubogeta, Gumawana, Omea, Kotoita, and Bituma. Gumawama has been influenced by the nearby Dobu language, and speakers of Gumawana often have knowledge of other neighboring Papuan Tip languages.

=== Dialects ===
Gumawana had three dialects: Nubogeta, Omea, and Bituma. The last speaker of the Omea dialect died in April 1988. The Bituma dialect is very different from the Nubogeta dialect of Nubogeta and Gumawana islands in both syntax and lexicon.

== Phonology ==
Gumawana has 11 consonant phonemes and 5 vowel phonemes.

Gumawana consonants
	Bilabial	Labio-Dental	Alveolar	Velar
Plosive	p b		t d	k g
Fricative		v	s	
Nasal	m		n	
Lateral			l	

Olson represents the labio-dental consonant [v] as bilabial [β] in later works, and also includes the palatal approximant [j].

Gumawana vowels
	Front	Central	Back
Close	i		u
Close-mid	e		o
Open		a	

Syllables have a (C)V structure.

== Grammar ==
Clauses in Gumawana have a basic order of SOV. Oblique noun phrases occur between the direct object and the verb.

Koloto-ya-di weniya si-duduwe
man-REF-3PL dog 3PL-call.TR
'The men called the dog.'
