= Strepsinoma aulacodoidalis =

Scientific classification
- Domain: Eukaryota
- Kingdom: Animalia
- Phylum: Arthropoda
- Class: Insecta
- Order: Lepidoptera
- Family: Crambidae
- Genus: Strepsinoma
- Species: S. aulacodoidalis

Binomial name
- Strepsinoma aulacodoidalis Rothschild, 1915

Species of moth

Strepsinoma aulacodoidalis is a moth in the family Crambidae. It was described by Rothschild in 1915. It is found in New Guinea.

The wingspan is about 17 mm. The forewings are sooty cinnamon grey, with a median band from the base of the wing to well beyond the middle and a pale chestnut brown oblique band, as well as a black a submarginal line. The hindwings are sooty cinnamon grey. The postmedian band, as well as the outer and abdominal margins are orange brown.
