= Catapsephis melanostigma =

Scientific classification
- Kingdom: Animalia
- Phylum: Arthropoda
- Class: Insecta
- Order: Lepidoptera
- Family: Crambidae
- Genus: Catapsephis
- Species: C. melanostigma

Binomial name
- Catapsephis melanostigma Hampson, 1912

Species of moth

Catapsephis melanostigma is a moth in the family Crambidae. It was described by George Hampson in 1912. It is found in New Guinea.
