= Teldenia cathara =

Scientific classification
- Domain: Eukaryota
- Kingdom: Animalia
- Phylum: Arthropoda
- Class: Insecta
- Order: Lepidoptera
- Family: Drepanidae
- Genus: Teldenia
- Species: T. cathara

Binomial name
- Teldenia cathara Wilkinson, 1967

Species of hook-tip moth

Teldenia cathara is a moth in the family Drepanidae. It was described by Wilkinson in 1967. It is found on Rook Island and New Britain.

The length of the forewings is 11.5–12 mm for males and 11–14 mm for females.
