= Catapsephis =

Scientific classification
- Domain: Eukaryota
- Kingdom: Animalia
- Phylum: Arthropoda
- Class: Insecta
- Order: Lepidoptera
- Family: Crambidae
- Subfamily: Pyraustinae
- Genus: Catapsephis; Hampson, 1899

Genus of moths

Catapsephis is a genus of moths of the family Crambidae.

== Species ==
- Catapsephis apicipuncta Hampson, 1899
- Catapsephis flavizonalis Hampson, 1917
- Catapsephis leucomelaena Hampson, 1917
- Catapsephis melanostigma Hampson, 1912
- Catapsephis subterminalis Hampson, 1917
