= Teldenia alba =

Scientific classification
- Domain: Eukaryota
- Kingdom: Animalia
- Phylum: Arthropoda
- Class: Insecta
- Order: Lepidoptera
- Family: Drepanidae
- Genus: Teldenia
- Species: T. alba

Binomial name
- Teldenia alba Moore, 1882

Species of hook-tip moth

Teldenia alba is a moth in the family Drepanidae. It was described by Frederic Moore in 1882. It is found in Sri Lanka.

The length of the forewings is 9-11.5 mm for males and 13-13.5 mm for females. Adults are greyish white, both wings with a transverse discal zigzag band, composed of purplish lunules with black-speckled inner borders. Beyond the lunular band is a very indistinct pale purplish-brown lunular line and a marginal row of black dots. In females, the lunular band has a confluent purplish-brown line and the outer line and marginal black dots are more distinct.
