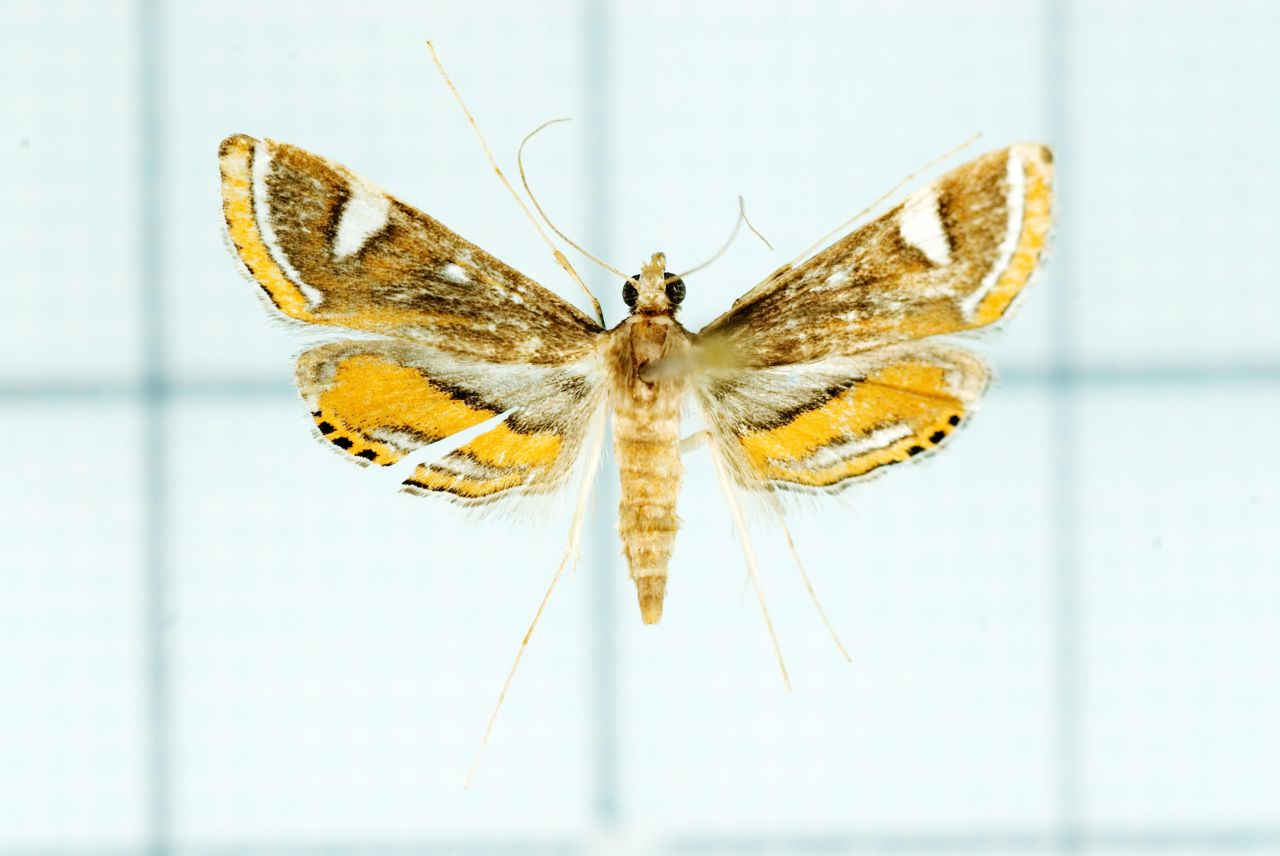
- Strepsinoma hapilistalis

Scientific classification
- Kingdom: Animalia
- Phylum: Arthropoda
- Class: Insecta
- Order: Lepidoptera
- Family: Crambidae
- Subfamily: Acentropinae
- Genus: Strepsinoma; Meyrick, 1897

= Strepsinoma =

Genus of moths

Strepsinoma is a genus of moths of the family Crambidae. It was described by Edward Meyrick in 1897.

== Species ==
- Strepsinoma albimaculalis Rothschild, 1915
- Strepsinoma albiplagialis Rothschild, 1915
- Strepsinoma amaura Meyrick, 1897
- Strepsinoma aulacodoidalis Rothschild, 1915
- Strepsinoma croesusalis Walker, 1859
- Strepsinoma ectopalis Hampson, 1897
- Strepsinoma foveata Turner, 1937
- Strepsinoma grisealis Rothschild, 1915
- Strepsinoma sphenactis Meyrick, 1897
- Strepsinoma tetralitha Hampson, 1917
