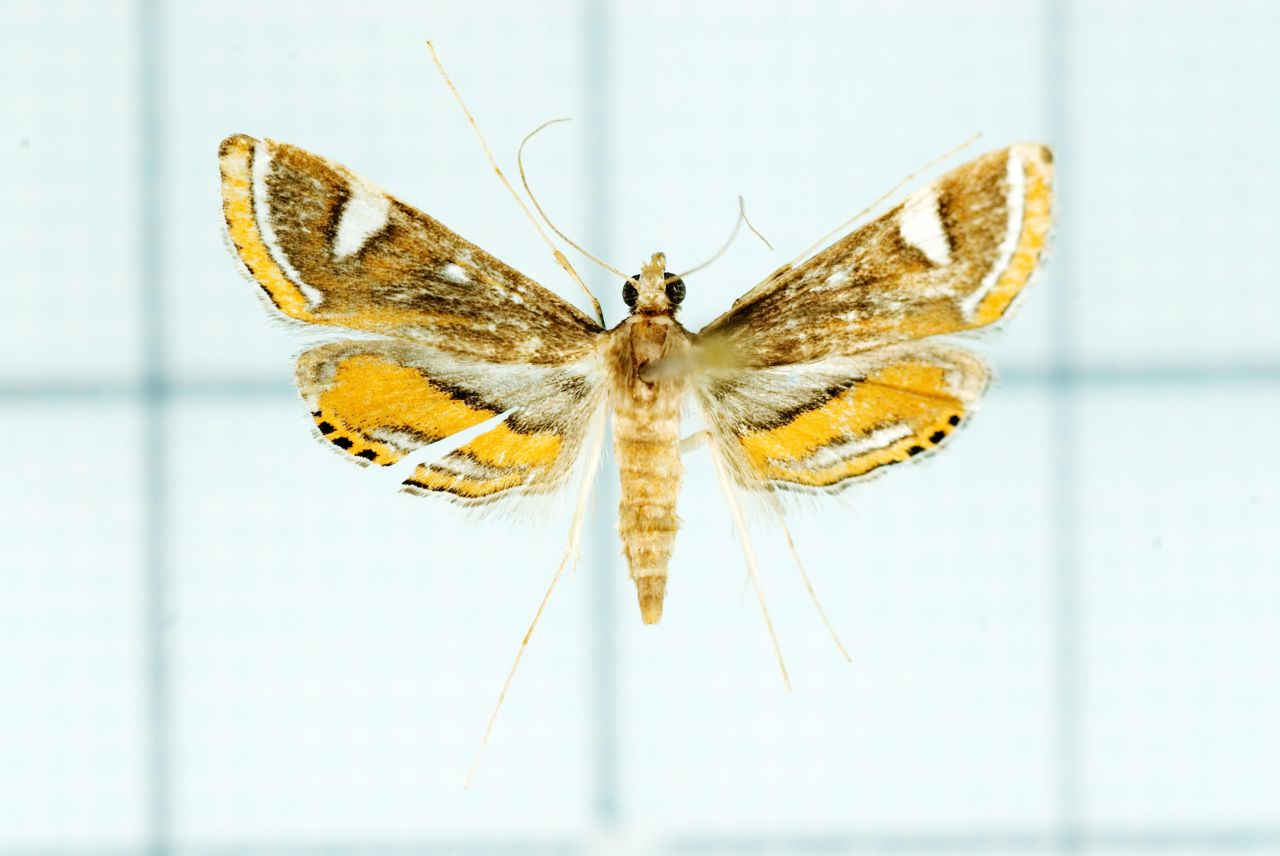

Scientific classification
- Kingdom: Animalia
- Phylum: Arthropoda
- Class: Insecta
- Order: Lepidoptera
- Family: Crambidae
- Genus: Strepsinoma
- Species: S. croesusalis

Binomial name
- Strepsinoma croesusalis (Walker, 1859)

Synonyms
- Cataclysta croesusalis Walker, 1859; Cataclysta croesusalis angustalis Caradja, 1925; Cataclysta trigonalis Swinhoe, 1895; Oligostigma hapilistale Strand, 1919; Strepsinoma hapilistalis

= Strepsinoma croesusalis =

Species of moth

Strepsinoma croesusalis is a species of moth of the family Crambidae. It was described by Francis Walker in 1859 and is found in Taiwan, China, India and Borneo.

== Subspecies ==
- Strepsinoma croesusalis croesusalis (Borneo)
- Strepsinoma croesusalis trigonalis (Swinhoe, 1895) (India)
- Strepsinoma croesusalis hapilistale (Strand, 1919) (Taiwan)
- Strepsinoma croesusalis angustalis (Caradja, 1925) (China: Canton)
