= Teldenia niveata =

Scientific classification
- Domain: Eukaryota
- Kingdom: Animalia
- Phylum: Arthropoda
- Class: Insecta
- Order: Lepidoptera
- Family: Drepanidae
- Genus: Teldenia
- Species: T. niveata

Binomial name
- Teldenia niveata Pagenstecher, 1896

Synonyms
- Teldenia angustifascia Watson, 1961

Species of hook-tip moth

Teldenia niveata is a moth in the family Drepanidae. It was described by Pagenstecher in 1896. It is found on Sulawesi.
