= Strepsinoma tetralitha =

Scientific classification
- Kingdom: Animalia
- Phylum: Arthropoda
- Class: Insecta
- Order: Lepidoptera
- Family: Crambidae
- Genus: Strepsinoma
- Species: S. tetralitha

Binomial name
- Strepsinoma tetralitha (Hampson, 1917)

Synonyms
- Eristena tetralitha Hampson, 1917

Species of moth

Strepsinoma tetralitha is a moth in the family Crambidae. It was described by George Hampson in 1917. It is found on New Guinea.
