= Teldenia illunata =

Scientific classification
- Domain: Eukaryota
- Kingdom: Animalia
- Phylum: Arthropoda
- Class: Insecta
- Order: Lepidoptera
- Family: Drepanidae
- Genus: Teldenia
- Species: T. illunata

Binomial name
- Teldenia illunata Warren, 1907

Species of hooktip moth

Teldenia illunata is a moth in the family Drepanidae. It was described by Warren in 1907. It is found in New Guinea.

The length of the forewings is 13–15 mm for males and 13-15.5 mm for females. The forewings are white. The hindwings are as the forewings.
