= Teldenia strigosa =

Scientific classification
- Domain: Eukaryota
- Kingdom: Animalia
- Phylum: Arthropoda
- Class: Insecta
- Order: Lepidoptera
- Family: Drepanidae
- Genus: Teldenia
- Species: T. strigosa

Binomial name
- Teldenia strigosa Warren, 1903

Species of hook-tip moth

Teldenia strigosa is a moth in the family Drepanidae. It was described by Warren in 1903. It is found in New Guinea and on Goodenough Island.
