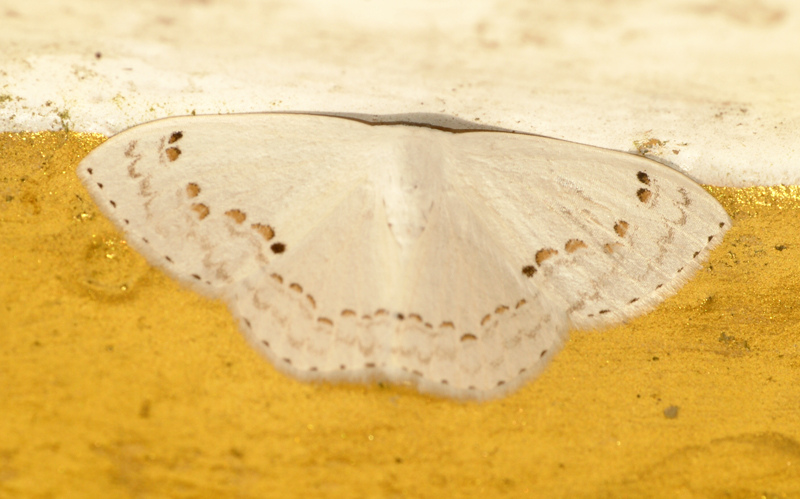

Scientific classification
- Kingdom: Animalia
- Phylum: Arthropoda
- Clade: Pancrustacea
- Class: Insecta
- Order: Lepidoptera
- Family: Drepanidae
- Genus: Teldenia
- Species: T. specca

Binomial name
- Teldenia specca Wilkinson, 1967

= Teldenia specca =

Species of hook-tip moth

Teldenia specca is a moth in the family Drepanidae. It was described by Wilkinson in 1967. It is found in the north-eastern Himalayas and from western China to Borneo, Sumatra, Palawan, Buru and New Guinea.
