= Strepsinoma grisealis =

Scientific classification
- Domain: Eukaryota
- Kingdom: Animalia
- Phylum: Arthropoda
- Class: Insecta
- Order: Lepidoptera
- Family: Crambidae
- Genus: Strepsinoma
- Species: S. grisealis

Binomial name
- Strepsinoma grisealis Rothschild, 1915

Species of moth

Strepsinoma grisealis is a moth in the family Crambidae. It was described by Rothschild in 1915. It is found in New Guinea.

The wingspan is about 20 mm. The fore- and hindwings are uniform brownish mouse grey.
