= Catapsephis subterminalis =

Scientific classification
- Kingdom: Animalia
- Phylum: Arthropoda
- Clade: Pancrustacea
- Class: Insecta
- Order: Lepidoptera
- Family: Crambidae
- Genus: Catapsephis
- Species: C. subterminalis

Binomial name
- Catapsephis subterminalis Hampson, 1917

Species of moth

Catapsephis subterminalis is a moth in the family Crambidae. It was described by George Hampson in 1917. It is found on the Solomon Islands.
