= Teldenia argeta =

Scientific classification
- Kingdom: Animalia
- Phylum: Arthropoda
- Clade: Pancrustacea
- Class: Insecta
- Order: Lepidoptera
- Family: Drepanidae
- Genus: Teldenia
- Species: T. argeta

Binomial name
- Teldenia argeta Wilkinson, 1967

Species of hook-tip moth

Teldenia argeta is a moth in the family Drepanidae. It was described by Wilkinson in 1967. It is found in the Philippines and possibly also on Buru.
