= Teldenia geminata =

Scientific classification
- Domain: Eukaryota
- Kingdom: Animalia
- Phylum: Arthropoda
- Class: Insecta
- Order: Lepidoptera
- Family: Drepanidae
- Genus: Teldenia
- Species: T. geminata

Binomial name
- Teldenia geminata Warren, 1922

Species of hook-tip moth

Teldenia geminata is a moth in the family Drepanidae. It was described by Warren in 1922. It is found in New Guinea.
