= Catapsephis leucomelaena =

Scientific classification
- Kingdom: Animalia
- Phylum: Arthropoda
- Class: Insecta
- Order: Lepidoptera
- Family: Crambidae
- Genus: Catapsephis
- Species: C. leucomelaena

Binomial name
- Catapsephis leucomelaena Hampson, 1917

Species of moth

Catapsephis leucomelaena is a moth in the family Crambidae. It was described by George Hampson in 1917. It is found on the Solomon Islands.
