= Dobu Rural LLG =

Local-level government in Papua New Guinea

- Country: Papua New Guinea
- Province: Milne Bay Province
- Time zone: UTC+10 (AEST)

Dobu Rural LLG is a local-level government (LLG) administering Dobu Island in Milne Bay Province, Papua New Guinea.

== Wards ==
- 01. Maiabari
- 02. Bwakera
- 03. Koruwea
- 04. Io'o
- 05. Taulu
- 06. Sisiana
- 07. Miadeba
- 08. Darubia
- 09. Kenaia
- 10. Buduwagula
- 11. Nade
- 12. Sill'Ilugu
- 13. Wesoiliwe
- 14. Galibwa
- 15. Neboluwa
- 16. Salamo
- 17. Gomwa
- 18. Begasi
- 19. Du'una
- 20. Daguyala
- 21. Deidei
- 22. Bwaiowa
- 23. Sawa'edi
- 24. Waluma East
- 25. Waluma West
- 26. Sebutuya
- 27. Momoawa
- 28. Basima
- 29. Urua
- 30. Gameta
- 31. Duduna
- 32. Wadalei
- 33. Bosalewa
- 34. Gumawana
- 35. Sanaroa
