= Fergusson Island =

Island in Papua New Guinea

Fergusson
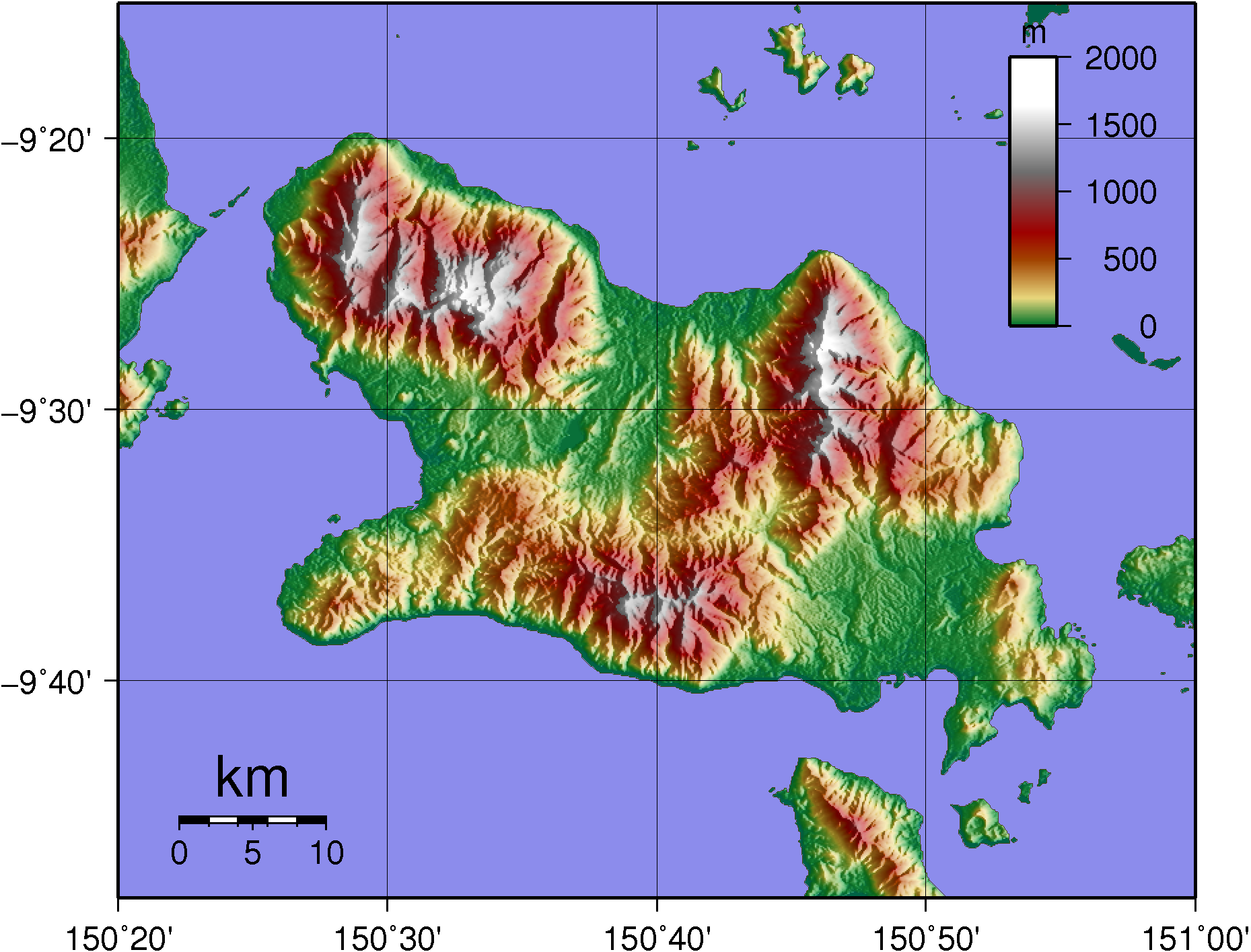
- Topographical map of Fergusson Island.

- Location within Papua New Guinea

Geography
- Coordinates: 09°31′03″S 150°40′30″E
- Archipelago: D'Entrecasteaux Islands
- Area: 1,437 km^{2} (555 sq mi)
- Highest elevation: 2,073 m (6801 ft)
- Highest point: Mount Kilkerran

Administration
- Papua New Guinea
- Province: Milne Bay Province
- District: Esa'ala District
- Largest settlement: Salamo

Demographics
- Population: 13,000 (1971)

Fergusson Island is the largest island of the D'Entrecasteaux Islands, in Papua New Guinea. It has an area of 1,437 square kilometres (555 sq mi), and mostly consists of mountainous regions, covered by rain forests. There are three large volcanoes on the island.

Fergusson Island is situated 3 km across the Dawson Strait from Normanby Island and 4 km from Goodenough Island across Moresby Strait.

The highest peak at 6,801 feet (2,073 metres) near Wadalei in the north-east of Fergusson Island is an extinct volcano. Seymour Bay is located on the west coast, Sebutuia Bay on the east, and Hughes Bay on the north. The principal settlements, Salamo and Mapamoiwa, are on the southern coast. Gold deposits at Wapolu on the north coast were worked briefly in the mid-1990s.

The island was named by Captain John Moresby after Sir James Fergusson, who was Governor-General of New Zealand from 1873 to 1874.

On June 30, 1942, during World War II, a United States Navy PT-Boat base was established on the island. An Alamo Scouts Training Center was established at Kalo Kalo on November 28, 1943.

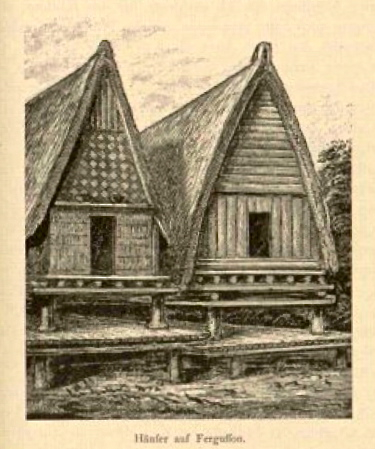
Houses on Fergusson Island, 1884–1885 sketch by Otto Finsch

== See also ==
- Panniet naked-backed fruit bat
- Black-naped pheasant-pigeon
