= Hovdhaugen =

Hovdhaugen is a surname. Notable people with the surname include:

- Einar Hovdhaugen (1908–1996), Norwegian politician
- Even Hovdhaugen (1941–2018), Norwegian linguist
