= Mekeo language =

Language spoken in Papua New Guinea

Mekeo
- Native to: Papua New Guinea
- Region: Central Province
- Native speakers: 20,000 (2015)
- Language family: Austronesian: Malayo-Polynesian; Oceanic; Western Oceanic; Papuan Tip; Central Papuan Tip; Nuclear West Central; Mekeo

Language codes
- ISO 639-3: mek
- Glottolog: meke1243
- Location within Papua New Guinea
- Coordinates: 8.24°S 146.59°E

Mekeo is a language spoken in Papua New Guinea and had 19,000 speakers in 2003. It is an Oceanic language of the Papuan Tip Linkage. The two major villages that the language is spoken in are located in the Central Province of Papua New Guinea. These are named Ongofoina and Inauaisa. The language is also broken up into four dialects: East Mekeo (or "Bush Mekeo"); Northwest Mekeo (or "Kovio"); West Mekeo and North Mekeo. The standard dialect is East Mekeo. This main dialect is addressed throughout the article. In addition, there are at least two Mekeo-based pidgins.

== Phonology ==
Numerous different analyses of Mekeo phonology have been made. This section follows the description in Jones (1998) as this covers all four main dialects.

=== Vowels ===
All dialects of Mekeo have five vowel phonemes, shown on the table below:

	Front	Back
Close	i	u
Mid	e	o
Open	a	

=== Consonants ===
The four dialects of Mekeo have notably different consonant inventories, although all are marked by small inventories of between six and eight consonants.

==== Northwest Mekeo ====
Northwest Mekeo is notable being the only known language with no coronal phonemes, violating what was previously thought to be a linguistic universal:

		Labial	
		+	−
Obstruent	voiceless	p	k
Obstruent	voiced	β	ɡ
Sonorant	nasal	m	ŋ
Sonorant	oral	w	j

/ɡ/ is realised as [dzʲ] before /i/, and /ŋ/ as [n] in the environment of /i/ or very rarely as a free variant in other positions. Otherwise coronals only appear in baby talk and loans. /β/ is in free variation with [v] and [b]. /w j/ vary with [o̯ ɛ̯ˤ].

==== West Mekeo ====
West Mekeo has a similar inventory but with /l b/ in place of /j β/:

		Labial	
		+	−
Obstruent	voiceless	p	k
Obstruent	voiced	b	ɡ
Sonorant	nasal	m	ŋ
Sonorant	oral	w	l

[β] is seen as an allophone of /b/. Similarly to Northwest Mekeo, /ɡ ŋ/ become coronals around /i/. /l/ is velarised to varying degrees.

==== East Mekeo ====
East Mekeo has only seven consonants:

	Labial	Coronal	Dorsal	Glottal
Plosive	p		k	ʔ
Fricative	f			
Sonorant	m	l	ŋ	

/ʔ/ is subject to occasional loss. /f/ may be realised as any of [ɸ β f v]. /k/ may be realised as [tsʲ] or [tʃ] before /i/ although this is not the case for all speakers. /ŋ/ is realised as [n] under the same conditions as other dialects.

==== North Mekeo ====
North Mekeo has even fewer, with just six consonants:

	Labial	Coronal	Dorsal
Plosive	b		ɡ
Fricative	β		
Sonorant	m	l	ŋ

/β/ varies with [f] and [ɸ]. /k/ becomes [tsʲ] or [dʒ] before /i/. /ŋ/ has the same variation.

==== Intrusive consonants ====
In all dialects, an "intrusive consonant" is inserted between the vowels /i/ and /a/ in sequence.

- In Northwest Mekeo, /ia/ → [ija]~[ia]
- In West Mekeo, /ia/ → [ida]
- In North Mekeo, /ia/ → [iza~isa~iʒa~iʃa], and likewise /io/ → [izo] etc.
- In East Mekeo, /ia/ → [isa], /io/ → [iso] and /ua/ → [ufa]

While the latter example inserts an existing phoneme in the language (/f/ in East Mekeo), the other examples are all allophonic.

==== Consonant correspondences ====
The dialects of Mekeo show the following regular correspondences of consonant phonemes:

Northwest	β	p	w	g	k	m	ŋ	j
West	b	p	w	g	k	m	ŋ	l
North	b	β		g		m	ŋ	l
East	p	f		k	ʔ	m	ŋ	l

== Morphology ==
=== Pronouns and person markers ===
In Mekeo, personal pronouns primarily refer to humans; however, the third-person forms can also be used for animals and other objects as well. Mekeo uses a range of different pronouns for different situations. The following table shows all the main personal pronouns for East Mekeo. This includes unmarked, emphatic and reflexive personal pronouns. Note that the emphatic pronouns are not common in East Mekeo as they compete with another more common topicaliser, au-ŋa. For example, the preferred form for the first person singular would be lau- au-ŋa. In the following table, 1, 2 and 3 indicate the person, SG and PL indicate whether the example is singular or plural and I and E stand for inclusive and exclusive.

	Unmarked	Emphatic	Reflexive
1SG	lau	lau-ŋa	ʔifo-u
2SG	oi	oi-ŋa	ʔifo-mu/ʔifō
3SG	isa	isa-ŋa	ʔifo-ŋa/ʔifo-ŋa-mo
1PL.I	iʔa/isa	iʔ-ŋa/isa-ŋa	ʔifo-ʔa
1PL.E	lai	lai-ŋa	ʔifo-mai
2PL	oi	oi-ŋa	ʔifo-mi
3PL	isa	isa-ŋa	ʔifo-i/ʔifo-ʔi

==== Examples ====
The following examples demonstrate the use of some of the above personal pronouns in context.

E-ʔifo
3SG-self
'S/he is one of a kind.'

Maa-mu umu koà lopia-ŋa
Eye-2SG charcoal likeness beautiful
'Your eyes are beautiful, like charcoal.'

Oi, nao koa, ioi-mu
2SG European likeness same-2SG
'You are like a European.'

ia e-lao afu ioi-na e-lao
elsewhere 3SG-go place different-3SG 3SG-go
'He has gone elsewhere.'

== Grammar ==
=== Possessive constructions ===
Possession in Mekeo has two morpho-syntactic distinctions: direct or indirect constructions. Direct possession concerns kinship relations and 'part of a whole relations' and these kind of relations are cultural in origin. Indirect possession covers a more general possession of alienable property.

==== Direct possession ====
Direct possession relies on relational terms that often form closed subsystems such as kinship terms. In Mekeo, the two relation terms involved in each equation are joined by another term that operates like a transitive verb. The third term is the 'relator' and must be marked for agreement with one of the other terms in the equation. The relator follows the subject and/or the object. The relator is marked for the person and number of the second term or the object.

SUBJECT OBJECT RELATOR
Isa lau ama-u
s/he I father-1SG
'He is my father.'

==== Indirect possession ====
Expressing alienable possession in Mekeo requires the prefix E- and its various realisations (including zero). This morpheme is then optionally preceded by a free or bound pronoun and then the compulsory suffixed by a pronominal suffix which indicates the person and number of the possessor.

Eŋaʔi-na lau e-u foʔama
that I POSS-1SG food
'That is my (vegetable) food.'

The negative is expressed with negators maini, aibaia and laa'i:

E-u foʔama laa'i
POSS-1SG food not
'I have no food'

The following is an example of an alternation of the cliticisation process:

Inaʔina auŋa iʔa ʔa eʔa
this TOPIC we.I POSS.1PL.I house
'This one is our house'

Another morpheme to express possession is the location pronoun KE- (realised as ke or ʔe). This pronoun expresses location or place:

Ke-u-ai pokama mako
LOC-1SG-OBL food much
'I have lots of food.'

=== Negation ===
Mekeo expresses negation in three ways:

- through the negative particle aʼi, which negates nominal predicates;
- through existential negators, which differ between dialects; and
- through a negative verb prefix, which negates verbal predicates.

This three-way functional distinction between different types of negation is typical of Oceanic languages.

==== Nominal Negation ====
Nominal predicates (which consist of one or more nominals) are negated in two ways — through either the negative particle or proclitic aʼi, or through existential negator particles.

The negative particle aʼi is found in all dialects of Mekeo, with ⟨ʼ⟩ pronounced as either a weak glottal stop or slight pause most dialects, or even not at all (/ai/) in East Mekeo. (Note: Jones (1998) only attempts a rough phonemic transcription of this particle, but does record this variation between dialects.) Aʼi negates a nominal predicate as seen in examples 10 and 11:

A'i oʔo!
NEG fat
'(It is) not fat!'

Tsi aʼi mekia-ŋa
tea NEG sweet-ASS
'The tea is unsweet!'

Aʼi also occurs as a proclitic particle before nominals, as seen in examples 12 and 13. In this case is functions similar to the English prefixes 'non-' or 'un-'.

Ai-ofu fa-mia
NEG-dirt OBLG.1SG-become
'I would like to be spotless.'

E-mu ŋope a'i-fou-ŋa ŋa-mia
POSS-2SG fast NEG-public-3SG IMP.3SG-become
'Don't let your fast be public knowledge.'

All four dialects of Mekeo have existential negators: maini in North-West Mekeo, aibaia or aibaida in West Mekeo, aibaia or aibaiza in North Mekeo, and laaʼi in East Mekeo. The existential negators are sentence-final predicates — where a verb would otherwise be — and express denial of the existence, presence or identity of the preceding nominal predicate. (Note: See Mosel (1999) for an explanation of the interpretation of the term 'denial' in this context.) Examples 14 to 17 show the existential negator of each dialect.

In both West Mekeo and Northern Mekeo, aibaia can be analyzed as a compound of a'i 'not' and baia 'mere'. These two dialects also have an intrusive consonant, so aibaia is often realised as /aibaida/ in West Mekeo and /aibaiza/ in North Mekeo.

Agaoā maini
spouse.3SG not
'He has no wife.' (lit. 'Wife.his not.')

Gaba-alaka aibaia
thing-one not
'It doesn't matter.' (lit. 'There is nothing.')

Tsuga aibaiza
sugar not
'There is no sugar.'

Ava laa'i.
some(-thing) not
'It doesn't matter.' (lit. 'It is nothing.')

The existential negators can also function similarly to aʼi, so examples 14 and 16 above could alternatively be read as 'She is not his wife' (or 'He is not her husband') and 'This is not sugar' respectively.

==== Verbal negation ====
Verbal predicates (which consist of a verb word (Note: Jones (1998) notes that while a Mekeo verb and its various affixes have traditionally been referred to as a 'verb phrase', this construction is more accurately called a "verb word".) and its arguments) in Mekeo are negated by a negator prefix attached to the predicate's verb word. Within the verb word, the negator prefix is found between tense-aspect-mood prefixes and the subject marker, with an intrusive consonant before the subject marker in some dialects. This negator prefix negates the entire verbal predicate. The position of the negator prefix between the tense-aspect-mood prefixes and the verb base is generally common in Oceanic languages.

Example 18 shows the position of the negator prefix in the North Mekeo expression Fázobálifúa! 'Don't spill it!':

F- ai- z- o- ba- lifu -Ø- -Ø- -a
OBLG- NEG- B- 2SG- CA- wrong TH -PF -3SG
'Don't spill it!'

Examples 19 to 22 show the negator prefix in all four Mekeo dialects. Jones tentatively reconstructs the negator prefix in Proto-Mekeo as */aʔi/, cognate with Motu asi and both descended from Proto-Central-Papuan */ati/.

A-e-io.
NEG-3SG-go
'(S)he has not gone.'

Ai-j-i-ao.
NEG-B-3SG-go
'(S)he has not gone.'

Ai-z-e-ao.
NEG-B-3SG-go
'(S)he has not gone.'

A-e-lao.
NEG-3SG-go
'(S)he has not gone.'

In North-West Mekeo, the existential negator maini (see example 14) also occurs before some verbs to negate them in either the past tense or in the prohibitive mood. This occurs in addition ae-, creating a double negative, as seen in example 23. Jones suggests that this may be to reduce ambiguity where the prefix ae- has otherwise assimilated with the verb stem; other dialects have an intrusive consonant between the negator prefix and verb stem, as shown in example 24 from West Mekeo.

maini ae-a-io
not NEG-1SG-go
'I didn't go.'

ai-d-ao
NEG-B-1SG.go
'I didn't go.'

== Demonstratives and spatial deictics ==
=== List of abbreviations used for examples in this section ===
Abbreviation	Meaning
ASS	Assertion/Predication Marker
B	Buffer Consonant
CNT	Continuative Aspect Marker
DX	Deictic Particle
PF	Perfect-Perfective Aspect
OBL	Oblique Function
SG	Singular

=== Demonstrative sentence structure ===
According to World Atlas of Language Structures (WALS) writer Matthew S. Dryer, Mekeo is a mixed language type, meaning it does not follow a demonstrative-noun, or noun-demonstrative sentence structure, but has both.

Mekeo is spoken in the central province of Papua New Guinea. Kaki Ae is a neighbouring language of Mekeo. It is spoken to the north-east of where Mekeo is spoken. Kaki Ae has a demonstrative-noun sentence structure. Clifton describes Kaki Ae's noun phrase structure as Demonstrative-Place-Noun-Adjective-Numeral-Limiter, where the demonstrative precedes the noun, which is in accordance with the data on WALS.

According to Maino, Aufo and Bullock, Mekeo follows the following noun phrase structure: Demonstrative-Possessive/Noun/Adjective-Numeral/Quantifier.

=== Proximal demonstratives in the four dialects of Mekeo ===
According to Jones, in Mekeo, there are three "degrees of proximity… represented in three of the four dialects". These four dialects are NWMek (North West Mekeo), WMek (West Mekeo), NMek (North Mekeo) and EMek (East Mekeo).

Location	NWMek	WMek	NMek	EMek
Here	i-ke	Namo	Namo	i-na
There	e-ke	Na-ba/e-ŋa	E-ŋa	e-ŋa
Yonder	u-ke	e-ŋa-ke-ŋa-ina	e-ŋa-ke-ŋa-i-na	e-ŋa-ʔe-ŋa-i-na

According to Maino, Aufu and Bullock, there are two demonstratives egaina and inaina/l’ina. "These can refer to singular or plural, near or far", and is represented in the Tentative Grammar Description with the following table.

inaia	This, these
I’ina	This, those
Ega’ina	That, those

These can be represented through the following examples, provided by Jones.

Ike auke NWMek

Inaia auke-ŋa WMek

Naimo auke-ŋa WMek

Inaina amuʔe-ŋa EMek

this dog-3SG.ASS

'This (is a) dog.'

This noun phrase can be expanded by adding a suffix that marks the person and number of the deictic pronoun.

Amuʔe eʔle, la-isa
Dog-3SG small 1SG-see
'The small dog, I saw it'

Inaina has been dropped as the this has been changed to the, and eʔle ('small') has been added.

There can also be a second modifier, attached before the adjective:

Eŋaina amuʔe-ŋa eʔele-ŋa, la-isa
that dog-3SG small-3SG 1SG-see
'That dog, the small one, I saw it'

The demonstrative 'that' (Eŋaina is evident here, along with the third-person singular noun dog and adjective. The second modifier -ŋa has been attached to eʔele ('small').

==== Deictic particles ====
There also exists deictic particles (DX) in Mekeo, illustrated in the West Mekeo example below:

Nga-e katsia-ŋa-ai
DX-CNT soil-3SG-OBL
'in that place'

=== Anaphoric and exophoric use of demonstratives ===
Mekeo uses both anaphoric and exophoric use of demonstratives, and clear anaphors are rare in Mekeo. Anaphoric strategies are not always effective in their identification according to Jones. Jones utilises the phrase "deictic reinforcement" for Mekeos use of personal pronouns or demonstrative pronouns to refer back to what has just been mentioned. Demonstrative pronouns are used for four reasons: to announce a new topic, to return to a previously mentioned topic, to announce a new topic specifically so as to not confuse with already established topics, and to "emphasise the presumed accessibility of a referent to the hearer".

An example of anaphoric demonstrative is shown in East Mekeo:

Eŋa’ina amuʔe!
That dog-3SG
'That is a dog!'

According to Jones, the comma represents the "actual or potential pause" within the sentence.

==== Exophoric use of demonstratives ====
An example of exophoric use of demonstratives is highlighted by Jones:

ini, bani-na
bird wing-3SG
'As for the bird, its wing!'

According to Jones, this sentence "translates to 'As for the bird, its wing!', that is as for the bird, it is its wing that is here important/salient/relevant".

Jones points out that there is an "implicit deictic argument it/that". For exophoric topics, when kin terms are used the topic is always a personal pronoun.

Isa, lau ama-u
he I father-1SG
'He is my father OR he/him, my father'

The personal pronoun isa is used.

==== Deictic predicates ====
Deictic predicates occur when the reference is not given. For example, the following response would be given to the question "Which dog do you mean?"

Amuʔe eŋaʔi-na
dog that-3SG
'That's the dog (The dog is the one)'

The demonstrative eŋaʔi-na is used in the example above.

There is variation among the four dialects:

Ike auke
Inaia auke-ŋa
Namo auke-ŋa
Inaina amuʔe-ŋa
this dog-3SG.ASS
'This (is a) dog.'

Papie aŋa’o la-isa au-ŋa fe’a e-pua-i-s-a
woman one 1SG-see one-3SG basket 3SG-carry-PF-B-3SG
'I saw a woman (who was) carrying a basket'

The placement of commas is important in the Mekeo language. Jones highlights that if a comma had been placed after Papie aŋa’o, then the translation would shift to "a woman who was carrying a basket".

== Trade language ==
Imunga Trade Language
- Native speakers: None
- Language family: Mekeo-based pidgin

Language codes
- ISO 639-3: None (mis)
- Glottolog: imun1234

Ioi Trade Jargon
- Native speakers: None
- Language family: Mekeo-based pidgin

Language codes
- ISO 639-3: None (mis)
- Glottolog: ioit1234

Jones (1996) reports two forms of pidgin Mekeo used for trade: the Imunga Trade Language and the Ioi Trade Jargon.

== Bibliography ==
- Aufo, Rose; Maino, Rock; Bullock, Juliann (2015). Tentative Grammar Description for the Mekeo Language. Papua New Guinea: SIL.
- Blevins, Juliette (2009). "Another Universal Bites the Dust: Northwest Mekeo Lacks Coronal Phonemes" (PDF). Oceanic Linguistics. 48 (1): 264–273. doi:10.1353/ol.0.0033. ISSN 1527-9421.
- Chung, Je-Soon (1995). "Orthography paper for Mekeo language in Central Province of Papua New Guinea" (PDF). SIL International.
- Crowley, Terry; Lynch, John; Ross, Malcolm (2001). The Oceanic Languages. Routledge Language Family Series. Routledge. ISBN 9781136749858.
- Jones, Alan A. (1996). "Privately owned Mekeo-based trade languages". In Wurm, Stephen Adolphe; Mühlhäusler, Peter; Tryon, Darrell T. (eds.). Atlas of languages of intercultural communication in the Pacific, Asia and the Americas. Berlin: Mouton de Gruyter. pp. 219–224. ISBN 3110134179.
- Jones, Alan A. (1998). Towards a lexicogrammar of Mekeo (an Austronesian language of Western Central Papua). Pacific Linguistics. Vol. Series C-138. Canberra: Pacific Linguistics. doi:10.15144/PL-C138. hdl:1885/146186. ISBN 0-85883-472-3.
- Lewis, M. Paul, ed. (2009). Ethnologue: Languages of the World (16th ed.). Dallas: SIL International.
- Mosel, Ulrike (1999). "Towards a typology of negation in Oceanic languages". In Hovdhaugen, Even; Mosel, Ulrike (eds.). Negation in Oceanic Languages: typological studies. LINCOM studies in Austronesian linguistics. Vol. 2. München: LINCOM EUROPA. pp. 1–19. ISBN 3-89586-602-4.
- SIL International (2004). Organised Phonology Data: Mekeo Language (Report). SIL International. pp. 1–3.
