= Samoan language =

Polynesian language

Samoan
- Gagana faʻa Sāmoa
- Native to: Samoa, American Samoa
- Ethnicity: Samoans
- Native speakers: 430,000 (2020–2022)
- Language family: Austronesian: Malayo-Polynesian; Central–Eastern Malayo-Polynesian?; Eastern Malayo-Polynesian; Oceanic; Central–Eastern Oceanic; Central Pacific; East Central Pacific; Polynesian; Nuclear Polynesian; Samoic?; Samoan–Tokelauan; Samoan
- Early forms: Proto-Austronesian: Proto-Malayo-Polynesian; Proto-Oceanic; Proto-Central Pacific; Proto-Polynesian; Proto-Nuclear Polynesian; Proto-Samoic; Old Samoan
- Standard forms: Standard Samoan
- Dialects: Samoa Samoan; American Samoa Samoan
- Writing system: Latin (Samoan alphabet); Samoan Braille

Official status
- Official language in: Samoa; American Samoa

Language codes
- ISO 639-1: sm
- ISO 639-2: smo
- ISO 639-3: smo
- Glottolog: samo1305
- Linguasphere: 39-CAO-a
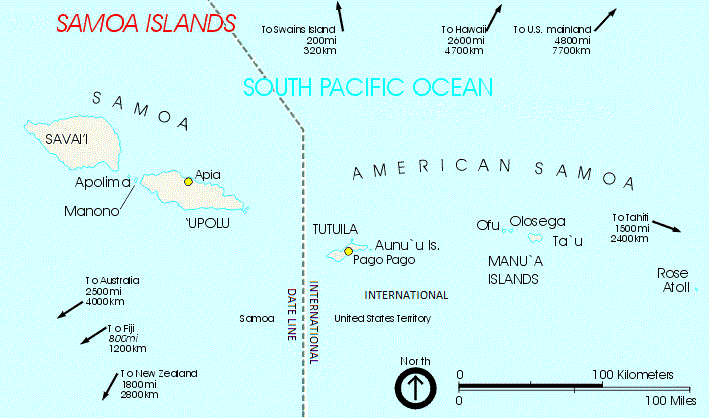
- Map of the Samoan Islands, where the language is natively spoken.

Samoan (Gagana faʻa Sāmoa or Gagana Sāmoa, pronounced [ŋaˈŋana ˈfaʔa ˈsaːmʊa]) is a Polynesian language spoken by Samoans of the Samoan Islands. Administratively, the islands are split between the sovereign country of Samoa and the United States territory of American Samoa. It is an official language, alongside English, in both jurisdictions. It is widely spoken across the Pacific region, heavily so in New Zealand and in Australia and the United States. Among the Polynesian languages, Samoan is the most widely spoken by a number of native speakers.

Samoan is spoken by approximately 260,000 people in the archipelago and with many Samoans living in diaspora in a number of countries, the total number of speakers worldwide was estimated at 510,000 in 2015. It is the third-most widely spoken language in New Zealand, where 2.2% of the population, 101,900 people, were able to speak it as of 2018.

The language is notable for the phonological differences between formal and informal speech as well as a ceremonial form used in Samoan oratory.

== Classification ==
Samoan is an analytic, isolating language. It is a member of the Austronesian family and is considered part of the Samoic branch of the Polynesian subphylum. It is closely related to other Polynesian languages with many shared cognate words such as aliʻi, ʻava, atua, tapu and numerals as well as in the name of gods in mythology.

Linguists differ somewhat on the way they classify Samoan in relation to the other Polynesian languages. The "traditional" classification, based on shared innovations in grammar and vocabulary, places Samoan with Tokelauan, the Polynesian outlier languages and the languages of Eastern Polynesia, which include Rapanui, Māori, Tahitian and Hawaiian. Nuclear Polynesian and Tongic (the languages of Tonga and Niue) are the major subdivisions of Polynesian under this analysis. A revision by Marck reinterpreted the relationships among Samoan and the outlier languages. In 2008 an analysis, of basic vocabulary only, from the Austronesian Basic Vocabulary Database is contradictory in that while in part it suggests that Tongan and Samoan form a subgroup, the old subgroups Tongic and Nuclear Polynesian are still included in the classification search of the database itself.

== Geographic distribution ==
Flag of Samoa.

Flag of American Samoa.

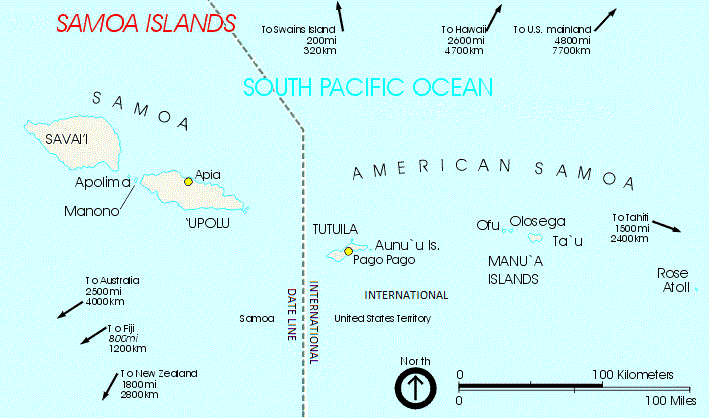
Samoa and American Samoan islands where Samoan is the official language.

There are approximately 470,000 Samoan speakers worldwide, 50 percent of whom live in the Samoan Islands.

Thereafter, the greatest concentration is in New Zealand, where there were 101,937 Samoan speakers at the 2018 census, or 2.2% of the country's population. Samoan is the third-most spoken language in New Zealand after English and Māori.

According to the 2021 census in Australia conducted by the Australian Bureau of Statistics, the Samoan language is spoken in the homes of 49,021 people.

US Census 2010 shows more than 180,000 Samoans reside in the United States, which is triple the number of people living in American Samoa, while slightly less than the estimated population of the island nation of Samoa – 193,000, as of July 2011.

Samoan Language Week (Vaiaso o le Gagana Sāmoa) is an annual celebration of the language in New Zealand supported by the government and various organisations including UNESCO. Samoan Language Week was started in Australia for the first time in 2010.

== Phonology ==
The Samoan alphabet consists of 14 letters, with three more letters (H, K, R) used in loan words. The ʻ (koma liliu or ʻokina) is used for the glottal stop.

| Aa, Āā | Ee, Ēē | Ii, Īī | Oo, Ōō | Uu, Ūū | Ff | Gg | Ll | Mm | Nn | Pp | Ss | Tt | Vv | (Hh) | (Kk) | (Rr) | ‘ |
|---|---|---|---|---|---|---|---|---|---|---|---|---|---|---|---|---|---|
| /a/, /aː/ | /ɛ/, /eː/ | /ɪ/, /iː/ | /o/, /ɔː/ | /ʊ, w/, /uː/ | /f/ | /ŋ/ | /l~ɾ/ | /m/ | /n, ŋ/ | /p/ | /s/ | /t, k/ | /v/ | (/h/) | (/k/) | (/ɾ/) | /ʔ/ |

=== Vowels ===
Vowel length is phonemic in Samoan; all five vowels also have a long form denoted by the macron. For example, tama means child or boy, while tamā means father.

Monophthongs
| | Front | | Central | | Back | |
| | short | long | short | long | short | long |
|---|---|---|---|---|---|---|
| Close | i | iː | | | u | uː |
| Mid | e | eː | | | o | oː |
| Open | | | a | aː | | |

- Diphthongs are /au̯ ao̯ ai̯ ae̯ ei̯ ou̯ ue̯/.
- /uV/ may be realized as [wV] in some words, e.g. uaua 'artery, tendon'.
- /a/ is reduced to [ə] in only a few words, e.g. mate or maliu 'dead', vave 'be quick'.

=== Consonants ===
The glottal stop /ʔ/ is phonemic in Samoan. Its presence or absence affects the meaning of words otherwise spelled the same, e.g. mai = from, originate from; maʻi = sickness, illness. The glottal stop is represented by the koma liliu ("inverted comma"), which is recognized by Samoan scholars and the wider community. The koma liliu is often replaced by an apostrophe in modern publications. Use of the apostrophe and macron diacritics in Samoan words was readopted by the Ministry of Education in 2012 after having been abandoned in the 1960s.

| | | Labial | Alveolar | Velar | Glottal |
|---|---|---|---|---|---|
| Nasal | | m | n | ŋ | |
| Plosive | | p | t | (k) | ʔ |
| Fricative | voiceless | f | s | | (h) |
| Fricative | voiced | v | | | |
| Lateral | | | l | | |
| Rhotic | | | (r) | | |

- The consonants in parentheses are only present in words borrowed from English and colloquial Samoan.
- In formal Samoan, used for example in news broadcasts or sermons, the consonants /t n ŋ/ are used. In colloquial Samoan, however, /n ŋ/ merge as [ŋ] and /t/ is pronounced [k]. (Note: A somewhat similar situation is found in Hawaiian, where /k/ is the reflex of *t and *ŋ has merged with *n.)
- /l/ is pronounced as a flap [ɾ] following a back vowel (/a, o, u/) and preceding an /i/; otherwise it is [l].
- /s/ is less sibilant (hissing) than in English.
- /r h/ are found in loanwords.

==== Foreign words ====
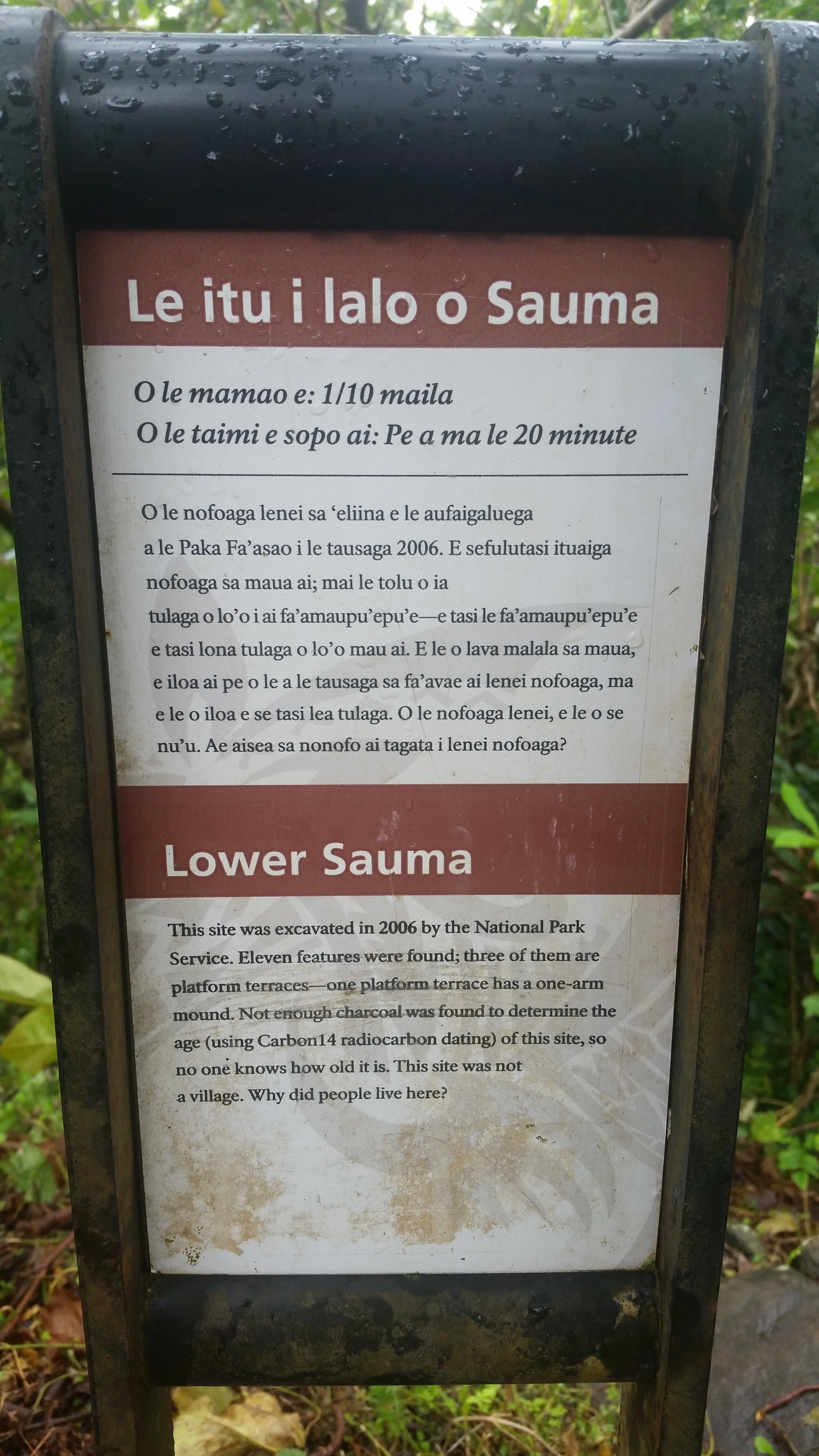
Bilingual sign at American Samoa National Park

Loanwords from English and other languages have been adapted to Samoan phonology:

- /k/ is retained in some instances (Christ = Keriso, club = kalapu, coffee = kofe), and has become [t] in rare instances (such as se totini, from the English stocking).
- /ɹ/ becomes [ɾ] in some instances (e.g. Christ = Keriso, January = Ianuari, number = numera), and [l] in others (January = Ianuali, herring = elegi).
- /d/ becomes [t] (David = Tavita, diamond = taimane).
- /ɡ/ becomes [k] in some cases (gas = kesi), while /tʃ/, /ʃ/ and /dʒ/ usually become [s] (Charles = Salesi, Charlotte = Salata, James = Semisi).
- /h/ is retained at the beginning of some proper names (Herod = Herota), but in some cases becomes an 's' (hammer = samala), and is omitted in others (herring = elegi, half-caste = afakasi)
- /z/ becomes [s] (Zachariah = Sakaria)
- /w/ becomes [v] (William = Viliamu)
- /b/ becomes [p] (Britain = Peretania, butter = pata)

=== Stress ===
Stress generally falls on the penultimate mora; that is, on the last syllable if that contains a long vowel or diphthong or on the second-last syllable otherwise.

Verbs formed from nouns ending in a, and meaning to abound in, have properly two aʻs, as puaa (puaʻaa), pona, tagata, but are written with one.

In speaking of a place at some distance, the accent is placed on the last syllable; as ʻO loʻo i Safotu, he is at Safotu. The same thing is done in referring to a family; as Sa Muliaga, the family of Muliaga, the term Sa referring to a wide extended family of clan with a common ancestor. So most words ending in ga, not a sign of a noun, as tigā, puapuaga, pologa, faʻataga and aga. So also all words ending in a diphthong, as mamau, mafai, avai.

In speaking the voice is raised, and the emphasis falls on the last word in each sentence.

When a word combines with an affix, stress is shifted forward. For example: alófa ('love'), alofága ('loving' or 'showing love'), alofagía ('beloved').

Reduplicated words have two accents. For example: pálapála, 'mud'; and ségiségi, 'twilight'. Compound words may have even three or four, according to the number of words and affixes of which the compound word is composed; as tofátumoánaíná, 'to be engulfed'.

The articles le and se are unaccented. When used to form a pronoun or participle, le and se are contractions for le e, se e, and so are accented; as ʻO le ona le meae, 'the owner' (literally 'the one whose is the thing'), instead of O le e ona le meae. The sign of the nominative ʻoe, the prepositions o, a, i, e, and the euphonic particles i and te, are unaccented; as in ʻO maua, ma te o atu ia te oee ('we two will go to you').

Ina, the sign of the imperative, is accented on the ultima; ína, the sign of the subjunctive, on the penultima. The preposition iá is accented on the ultima, the pronoun ia on the penultima.

=== Phonotactics ===
Samoan syllable structure is (C)V, where V may be long or a diphthong. A sequence VV may occur only in derived forms and compound words; within roots, only the initial syllable may be of the form V. Metathesis of consonants is frequent, such as manu for namu 'scent', lavaʻau for valaʻau 'to call', but vowels may not be mixed up in this way.

Every syllable ends in a vowel. No syllable consists of more than three sounds, one consonant and two vowels, the two vowels making a diphthong; as fai, mai, tau. Roots are sometimes monosyllabic, but mostly disyllabic or a word consisting of two syllables. Polysyllabic words are nearly all derived or compound words; as nofogatā from nofo 'sit, seat' and gatā, 'difficult of access'; taʻigaafi, from taʻi, 'to attend', and afi, 'fire; hearth; making to attend to the fire'; talafaʻasolopito, '(history) stories placed in order', faletalimalo, 'communal house for receiving guests'.

== Grammar ==
=== Morphology ===
==== Personal pronouns ====
Like many Austronesian languages, Samoan has separate words for inclusive and exclusive we, and distinguishes singular, dual, and plural. The root for the inclusive pronoun may occur in the singular in forms like ta, in which case it indicates humility or pleading for help, called the "emotional" forms by Mosel & Hovdhaugen.

| | | singular | dual | plural |
|---|---|---|---|---|
| 1st person | exclusive | a‘u, ‘ou / ‘ita, ta‘ita, ta | mā‘ua, mā | mātou |
| 1st person | inclusive | a‘u, ‘ou / ‘ita, ta‘ita, ta | tā‘ua, tā | tātou |
| 2nd person | | ‘oe, ‘e | ‘oulua | ‘outou, tou |
| 3rd person | | ia / na | lā‘ua | lātou |

In formal speech, fuller forms of the roots mā-, tā-, and lā- are ‘imā-, ‘itā-, and ‘ilā-.

==== Articles ====
Articles in Samoan do not show the definiteness of the noun phrase as do those of English but rather specificity.

| | singular | plural |
|---|---|---|
| specific | le | ∅ |
| non-specific | se | ni |

The singular specific article le has frequently, erroneously, been referred to as a "definite" article, such as by Pratt, often with an additional vague explanation that it is sometimes used where English would require the indefinite article. As a specific, rather than a definite article, it is used for specific referents that the speaker has in mind (specificity), regardless of whether the listener is expected to know which specific referent(s) is/are intended (definiteness). A sentence such as ʻUa tu mai le vaʻa, could thus, depending on context, be translated into English as "A canoe appears", when the listener or reader is not expected to know which canoe, or "The canoe appears", if the listener or reader is expected to know which canoe, such as when the canoe has previously been mentioned.

The plural specific is marked by a null article: ʻO le tagata 'the person', ʻO tagata 'people'. (The word ʻoe in these examples is not an article but a "presentative" preposition. It marks noun phrases used as clauses, introducing clauses or used as appositions etc.)

The non-specific singular article se is used when the speaker doesn't have a particular individual of a class in mind, such as in the sentence Ta mai se laʻau, 'Cut me a stick', whereby there is no specific stick intended. The plural non-specific article ni is the plural form and may be translated into English as 'some' or 'any', as in Ta mai ni laʻau, 'Cut me some sticks'.

In addition, Samoan possesses a series of diminutive articles.

| | Singular | Plural |
|---|---|---|
| Specific diminutive-emotional | si | / |
| (Non-)specific diminutive-partitive | sina | / |
| Specific diminutive | / | nāi / nai |
| Non-specific diminutive | / | ni nāi / ni nai |

==== Nouns ====
Names of natural objects, such as men, trees and animals, are mostly primitive nouns, e.g. ʻO le la, 'the sun'; ʻo le tagata, 'the person'; ʻo le talo, 'the taro'; ʻo le iʻa, 'the fish'; also manufactured articles, such as matau, 'an axe', vaʻa, 'canoe', tao, 'spear', fale, 'house', etc.

Some nouns are derived from verbs by the addition of either ga, saga, taga, maga, or ʻaga: such as tuli, 'to chase'; tuliga, 'chasing'; luluʻu, 'to fill the hand'; luʻutaga, 'a handful'; feanu, 'to spit'; anusaga, 'spittle'; tanu, 'to bury'; tanulia, 'the part buried'. These verbal nouns have an active participial meaning; e.g. ʻO le faiga o le fale, 'the building of the house'. Often they refer to the persons acting, in which case they govern the next noun in the genitive with a; ʻO le faiga a fale, contracted into ʻo le faiga fale, 'those who build the house, the builders'. In some cases verbal nouns refer to either persons or things done by them: ʻO le faiga a talo, 'the getting of taro', or 'the party getting the taro', or 'the taro itself which has been gotten'. The context in such cases decides the meaning. Sometimes place is indicated by the termination; such as tofā, 'to sleep'; tofāga, 'a sleeping-place; a bed'. ʻO le taʻelega is either 'the bathing-place' or 'the party of bathers'. The first would take o after it to govern the next noun, ʻO le taʻelega o le nuʻu, 'the bathing-place of the village'; the latter would be followed by a, ʻO le taʻelega a teine, 'the bathing-place of the girls'.

Sometimes such nouns have a passive meaning, such as being acted upon; ʻO le taomaga a lau, 'the thatch that has been pressed'; ʻo le faupuʻega a maʻa, 'the heap of stones' (i.e., 'the stones which have been heaped up'). Those nouns which take ʻaga are rare, except on Tutuila; gataʻaga, 'the end'; ʻamataʻaga, 'the beginning'; olaʻaga, 'lifetime'; misaʻaga, 'quarrelling'. Sometimes the addition of ga makes the signification intensive; such as ua and timu, 'rain'; uaga and timuga, 'continued pouring (of rain)'.

The simple form of the verb is sometimes used as a noun: tatalo, 'to pray'; ʻo le tatalo, 'a prayer'; poto, 'to be wise'; ʻo le poto, 'wisdom'.

The reciprocal form of the verb is often used as a noun; e.g. ʻO le fealofani, ʻo femisaiga, 'quarrellings' (from misa), feʻumaiga; E lelei le fealofani, 'mutual love is good'.

A few diminutives are made by reduplication, e.g. paʻapaʻa, 'small crabs'; pulepule, 'small shells'; liilii, 'ripples'; ‘ili‘ili, 'small stones'.

Adjectives are made into abstract nouns by adding an article or pronoun; e.g. lelei, 'good'; ʻo le lelei, 'goodness'; silisili, 'excellent or best'; ʻo lona lea silisili, 'that is his excellence or that is his best'.

Many verbs may become participle-nouns by adding ga; as sau, 'come', sauga; e.g. ʻO lona sauga muamua, 'his first coming'; mau to mauga, ʻO le mauga muamua, 'the first dwelling'.

==== Gender ====
As there is no proper gender in Oceanic languages, different genders are sometimes expressed by distinct names:

| Male | | Female | |
|---|---|---|---|
| ʻO le matai | a chief | ʻO le tamaitaʻi | a lady |
| ʻO le tamāloa | a man | ʻO le fafine | a woman |
| ʻO le tama | a boy | ʻO le teine | a girl |
| ʻO le poʻa | a male animal | ʻO le manu fafine | a female animal |
| ʻO le toeaʻina | an elderly man | ʻO le loʻomatua | an elderly woman |
| sole | colloquial male label | suga, funa | colloquial female label |

When no distinct name exists, the gender of animals is known by adding poʻa and fafine respectively. The gender of some few plants is distinguished by tane and fafine, as in ʻo le esi tane; ʻo le esi fafine. No other names of objects have any mark of gender.

==== Number ====
The singular number is known by the article with the noun; e.g. ʻo le tama, a boy.

Properly there is no dual. It is expressed by omitting the article and adding numbers e lua for things e.g. e toʻalua teine, two girls, for persons; or ʻo fale e lua, two houses; ʻo tagata e toʻalua, two persons; or ʻo lāʻua, them/those two (people).

The plural is known by:

1. the omission of the article; ʻo ʻulu, 'breadfruits'.
2. particles denoting multitude, as ʻau, vao, mou, and moíu, and such plural is emphatic; ʻo le ʻau iʻa, a shoal of fishes; ʻo le vao tagata, a forest of men, i.e., a great company; ʻo le mou mea, 'a great number of things'; ʻo le motu o tagata, 'a crowd of people'. These particles cannot be used indiscriminately; motu could not be used with fish, nor ʻau with men.
3. lengthening, or more correctly doubling, a vowel in the word; tuafāfine, instead of tuafafine, 'sisters of a brother'. This method is rare.

Plurality is also expressed by internal reduplication in Samoan verbs (-CV- infix), by which the root or stem of a word, or part of it, is repeated.

savali → sāvavali
{walk (SG)} {} {walking (PL)}

alofa → ālolofa
{love (SG)} {} {loving (PL)}

{le tamāloa} → tamāloloa
{the man (SG)} {} {men (PL)}

==== Possessives ====
Possessive relations are indicated by the particles a or o. Possessive pronouns also have a-forms and o-forms: lou, lau, lona, lana, lo and la matou, etc. Writers in the 1800s like Platt were unable to understand the underlying principles governing the use of the two forms: there is no general rule which will apply to every case. The governing noun decides which should be used; thus ʻO le poto ʻo le tufuga fai fale, 'the wisdom of the builder'; ʻO le amio a le tama, 'the conduct of the boy'; ʻupu o fāgogo, 'words of fāgogo' (a form of narrated and sung storytelling); but ʻupu a tagata, 'words of men'. Pratt instead gives a rote list of uses and exceptions:

O is used with:

1. Nouns denoting parts of the body; fofoga o le aliʻi, 'eyes of the chief'. So of hands, legs, hair, etc.; except the beard, which takes a, lana ʻava; but a chief's is lona soesa. Different terms and words apply to chiefs and people of rank and status according to the "polite" variant of the Samoan language, similar to the "polite" variant in the Japanese language.
2. The mind and its affections; ʻo le toʻasa o le aliʻi, 'the wrath of the chief'. So of the will, desire, love, fear, etc.; ʻO le manaʻo o le nuʻu, 'the desire of the land'; ʻO le mataʻu o le tama, 'the fear of the boy'.
3. Houses, and all their parts; canoes, land, country, trees, plantations; thus, pou o le fale, 'posts of the house'; lona fanua, lona naʻu, etc.
4. People, relations, slaves; ʻo ona tagata, 'his people'; ʻo le faletua o le aliʻi, 'the chief's wife'. So also of a son, daughter, father, etc. Exceptions: Tane, 'husband'; ava, wife (of a common man), and children, which take a; lana, ava, ma, ana, fānau.
5. Garments, etc., if for use; ona ʻofu. Except when spoken of as property, riches, things laid up in store.

A is used with:

1. Words denoting conduct, custom, etc.; amio, masani, tu.
2. Language, words, speeches; gagana, upu, fetalaiga, afioga; ʻO le upu a le tama.
3. Property of every kind. Except garments, etc., for use.
4. Those who serve, animals, men killed and carried off in war; lana tagata.
5. Food of every kind.
6. Weapons and implements, as clubs, knives, swords, bows, cups, tattooing instruments, etc. Except spears, axes, and ʻoso (the stick used for planting taro), which take o.
7. Work; as lana galuega. Except faiva, which takes o.

Some words take either a or o; as manatu, taofi, ʻO se tali a Matautu, 'an answer given by Matautu'; ʻo se tali ʻo Matautu, 'an answer given to Matautu'.

Exceptions:

1. Nouns denoting the vessel and its contents do not take the particle between them: ʻo le ʻato talo, 'a basket of taro'; ʻo le fale oloa, 'a house of property, shop, or store-house'.
2. Nouns denoting the material of which a thing is made: ʻO le tupe auro, 'a coin of gold'; ʻo le vaʻa ifi, 'a canoe of teak'.
3. Nouns indicating members of the body are rather compounded with other nouns instead of being followed by a possessive particle: ʻO le mataivi, 'an eye of bone'; ʻo le isu vaʻa, 'a nose of a canoe'; ʻo le gutu sumu, 'a mouth of the sumu (type of fish)'; ʻo le loto alofa, 'a heart of love'.
4. Many other nouns are compounded in the same way: ʻO le apaau tane, 'the male wing'; ʻo le pito pou, 'the end of the post'.
5. The country or town of a person omits the particle: ʻO le tagata Sāmoa, 'a man or person of Samoa'.
6. Nouns ending in a, lengthen (or double) that letter before other nouns in the possessive form: ʻO le sua susu; ʻo le maga ala, or maga a ala, 'a branch road'.
7. The sign of the possessive is not used between a town and its proper name, but the topic marker ʻoe is repeated; thus putting the two in apposition: ʻO le ʻaʻai ʻo Matautu, 'the commons of Matautu'.

==== Adjectives ====
Some adjectives are primitive, as umi, 'long'; poto, 'wise'. Some are formed from nouns by the addition of a, meaning 'covered with' or 'infested with'; thus, ʻeleʻele, 'dirt'; ʻeleʻelea, 'dirty'; palapala, 'mud'; palapalā, 'muddy'.

Others are formed by doubling the noun; as pona, 'a knot'; ponapona, 'knotty'; fatu, 'a stone'; fatufatu, 'stony'.

Others are formed by prefixing faʻa to the noun; as ʻo le tu faʻasāmoa, Samoan custom or faʻamatai.

Like ly in English, the faʻa often expresses similitude; ʻo le amio faʻapuaʻa, 'to behave like a pig' (literally).

In one or two cases a is prefixed; as apulupulu, 'sticky', from pulu, 'resin'; avanoa, 'open'; from vā and noa.

Verbs are also used as adjectives: ʻo le ala faigatā, 'a difficult road'; ʻo le vai tafe, 'a river; flowing water'; ʻo le laʻau ola, 'a live tree'; also the passive: ʻo le aliʻi mātaʻutia.

Ma is the prefix of condition, sae, 'to tear'; masae, 'torn'; as, ʻo le ʻie masae, 'torn cloth'; goto, 'to sink'; magoto, 'sunk'; ʻo le vaʻa magoto, 'a sunken canoe'.

A kind of compound adjective is formed by the union of a noun with an adjective; as ʻo le tagata lima mālosi, 'a strong man' (literally 'the stronghanded man'); ʻo le tagata loto vaivai, 'a weak-spirited man'.

Nouns denoting the materials out of which things are made are used as adjectives: ʻo le mama auro, 'a gold ring'; ʻo le fale maʻa, 'a stone house'. Or they may be reckoned as nouns in the genitive.

Adjectives expressive of colours are mostly reduplicated words; as sinasina or paʻepaʻe ('white'); uliuli ('black'); samasama ('yellow'); ʻenaʻena ('brown'); mumu ('red'), etc.; but when they follow a noun they are usually found in their simple form; as ʻo le ʻie sina, 'white cloth'; ʻo le puaʻa uli, 'black pig'. The plural is sometimes distinguished by doubling the first syllable; as sina, 'white'; plural, sisina; tele, 'great'; pl. tetele. In compound words the first syllable of the root is doubled; as maualuga, 'high'; pl. maualuluga. Occasionally the reciprocal form is used as a plural; as lele, 'flying'; ʻo manu felelei, 'flying creatures; birds'.

Comparison is generally effected by using two adjectives, both in the positive state; thus e lelei lenei, ʻa e leaga lena, 'this is good, (and) that is bad not in itself but in comparison with the other'; e umi lenei, a e puupuu lena, 'this is long, (and) that is short'.

The superlative is formed by the addition of an adverb, such as matuā, tasi, sili, silisiliʻese aʻiaʻi, naʻuā; as ʻua lelei tasi, 'it alone is good; that is, nothing equals it'; ʻua matuā silisili ona lelei, 'it is very exceedingly good'; ʻua tele naʻuā, 'it is very great'; silisili ese, 'highest'; ese, 'differing from all others'.

Naua has often the meaning of 'too much'; ua tele naua, 'it is greater than is required'.

=== Syntax ===
Sentences have different types of word order and the four most commonly used are:

1. verb–subject–object (VSO)
2. verb–object–subject (VOS)
3. subject–verb–object (SVO)
4. object–verb–subject (OVS)

For example:- 'The girl went to the house.' (SVO); girl (subject), went (verb), house (object).

Samoan word order;

{Sa alu} {le teine} {ʻi le} {fale}.
went girl {} house

{Sa alu} {ʻi le} {fale} {le teine}.
went {} house girl

Le {fale} {sa alu} {ʻi ai} {le teine}.
{} house went {} girl

{Le teine} {sa alu} {ʻi le} {fale}.
girl went {} house

=== Negation ===
A phrase or clause can be made negative by the addition of a particle, a morpheme usually meaning 'not'. There are two common negative particles in Samoan, lē and leʻi (sometimes also written as lei). Lē has the allomorphs [le:] or [le]. Lē should not be confused for le, the specific singular article, which indicates that the noun phrase refers to one particular entity. Lē and lei negate declarative and interrogative sentences, but do not negate imperative sentences. Negative imperative verbs are discussed later in this entry. Lē (meaning 'not') can be combined with all tense-aspect-mood particles (or 'TAM' particles), except those that are optative and subjunctive, such as neʻi, seʻi, and ʻia.

A negative particle may mark a negative verbal clause, as seen in the example below.

‘Ua lē fiafia le tama
PERF not happy ART boy
'The boy is unhappy.'

In this example of a negated declarative sentence, it can be seen that, in Samoan, there is no equivalent gloss for 'unhappy'. The negative particle lē modifies the verbal clause to form something like "not happy" instead.

The meaning of leʻi differs slightly from that of lē. Leʻi indicates that an event or state has not been actualised yet, or for the time being, but is expected to become so. Therefore, leʻi is often translated as 'not yet' rather than simply 'not'. Leʻi is usually only combined with the general TAM particle e or te. See the example below.

E lei tea Tutuila ae amata le pele
GENR {not yet} part Tutuila but begin ART card-playing
'The playing of cards started already before we left Tutuila.'

The above example (2) demonstrates the common usage of leʻi to mean 'not yet'. In some cases, leʻi simply means 'no, not at all', expressing the concept that an event that had been expected to happen or had been thought to have happened, did not occur after all.

There is a particle, faʻa=, that acts as a causative, as well being as the most common prefix in the Samoan language. This particle can be attached to nearly all nouns and non-ergative verbs. When attached to negated verb phrases, faʻa= means having the qualities of or being similar to whatever is denoted by the basic stem or phrase. It is often combined with the negative particle lē (or its allomorphs) to form the construction faʻa=lē=. Prefixing Faʻa=lē= onto a verb provides a polite way to say a negative phrase. Mosel & Hovdhaugen state that these particles provide three ways to express negative evaluations that vary on a scale of politeness, as demonstrated below:

| (3) | leaga | lē lelei | fa‘a=lē=lelei |
| | "bad" | "not good" | "like=not=good" |
| | <------------------------------------------------------------------------------------------> |
| | less polite | | more polite |

==== Position of negation in sentences ====
In Samoan, particles modifying sentences usually take the first place in the sentence, with the exception of the question particle ʻea. The particles forming a category are not always mutually exclusive: for instance, while two negative particles cannot be combined, certain prepositions can occur together. Additionally, negative prenuclear particles will follow the preverbal pronoun or the TAM particle.

In the following examples from Mosel & Hovdhaugen, the negative particles follow the TAM particle te (Example 1: e) or the preverbal pronoun (Example 2: ʻou).

E lē lelei
GENR not good
'It is not good.'

ʻOu te lē alu i Apia
1SG GENR not go LD Apia
'I don't go to Apia.'

In both examples, the negative particle is in the second position, after the preverbal pronoun and/or the TAM particle. In Example 2, there is both a preverbal pronoun (ʻou) AND a TAM particle following it (te). This demonstrates that the negative particle must always follow these two types of preceding particles in the sentence, even if they are both present.

==== Verbs exempt from negation ====
There are two existential verbs in Samoan: iai, 'to exist, be present' and the negative equivalent leai [leái] or [le:ái], 'to not exist, be absent'. They differ from all other Samoan verbs in at least one respect: they cannot be negated by a negative particle. Mosel & Hovdhaugen (1992, pp. 114) suggest that this originates in the etymology of these verbs: the negative existential verb leai is probably derived from lē ('not') and ai (ANAPH, 'not there'). It seems that the inclusion of negation in the verb itself disallows the negative particle from the sentence structure.

See the example from Mosel & Hovdhaugen (1992, pp. 56) in the sentence below:

E leai ni taavale, aua e lei oo atu i ai ala taavale
GENR {not exist} ART(NSP.PL) car because GENR {not yet} reach DIR LD ANAPH road(SP.PL) car
'There were not any cars, because the roads did not reach there.'

In this example, the existential verb leai has been used to indicate the absence of something (that is, the cars) rather than using a negative particle. However, a negative particle (lei) has been used in the second clause, modifying the verbal clause to create the phrase "the roads did NOT reach there", with the emphasis on the absence of the roads in that area.

According to Mosel & Hovdhaugen (1992, pp. 480–481) the only TAM particles that appear with leai are ʻua and e or te. This means that leai acts as if non-existence is a general fact, rather than linking it to a specific point in time. When another verb follows leai within the same verb phrase, it functions as a more emphatic negation meaning something like "not at all". This is demonstrated in the following example:

E leai gāoi Sina
GENR {not exist} move Sina
'Sina didn't move at all.'

Here, the addition of leai to the verb gāoi "to move" makes the statement more emphatic: not only did Sina not move, she did not move at all.

==== Negative imperative verbs ====
There are two negative imperative verbs, ʻaua and sōia. ʻAua should not be confused with aua, which means 'because'. These negative imperative verbs can be used independently of negative particles; as the negation is in the verb itself, an extra particle is not required. ʻAua means 'don’t do, should not do' and is employed to express commands in both direct and indirect speech. What should not be done is indicated by a verbal complement clause, as seen in the example below.

ʻAua e te fa‘asāunoa ʻi mea=ola
Don't 2SG GENR torture LD thing=life(SP.PL)
'Do not torture animals.'

As discussed above, this sentence does not require a negative particle, because the negative imperative verb is sufficient. Alternatively, sōia means that 'one should stop doing something one has already started'. As with ʻaua, what should not be done is indicated by a verbal complement. In direct speech, sōia is either used in the imperative without any TAM particle or in the optative marked by seiʻi.

See the example below with sōia as the negative imperative:

Mandy-Jane! sōia e te faitala!
Mandy-Jane stop 2SG GENR gossip
'Mandy-Jane! Stop gossiping!'

This works differently from ʻaua, although they are both imperative. It can be seen here that sōia means something like 'cease what you are doing immediately' while ʻaua means 'don't do that action' (in a general sense).

==== Negation of existential clauses ====
The noun phrase forming an existential clause is introduced by a preposition: ʻoe or naʻo, meaning 'only'. An existential clause is negated with a complex clause: Mosel & Hovdhaugen state that "the existential clause functions as the argument of a verbal predicate formed by a TAM particle and the negative particle lē ('not')". An example of this can be seen in the example below, where the preposition o precedes the negative particle lē.

Aua foi, {o le a} le o Niu Sila, le o le Kolisi o Samoa a o le ta=mea ma le auli...
Because also, FUT not PRES New Zealand not PRES ART college POSS Samoa but PRES ART beat=thing and ART ironing
'There will be no New Zealand, no Samoan college [for me to go to if I do not pass the exam], but [only] washing and ironing [at home]....'

This complex sentence has several examples of negation where the negative particle lē is combined with the preposition o in order to negate an existential clause ("there will be no...").

== Registers ==
=== Formal versus colloquial register ===
The language has a polite or formal variant used in oratory and ceremony as well as in communication with elders, guests, people of rank and strangers.

The consonant system of colloquial Samoan (tautala leaga 'casual Samoan') as it is known) is slightly different from the literary language (tautala lelei 'proper Samoan'), and is referred to as K speech or K style. In colloquial speech, defined as taking place in casual social situations among intimates or in the home among familiars of equivalent social rank, /t/ is sometimes pronounced [k] and /n/ has merged with /ŋ/ as [ŋ]. Additionally, /l/ is pronounced [ɾ] following a back vowel (/a, o, u/) and preceding an /i/. /s/ is less sibilant than in English, and /h/ and /r/ are found only in borrowings, with /s/ and /l/ sometimes being substituted for them.

Therefore, in colloquial Samoan speech, common consonant replacements occur such as:

t is pronounced k – tama ('child, boy') is pronounced kama; tautala ('to speak') is pronounced kaukala; tulāfale ('orator; talking chief') is pronounced kulāfale.

n is pronounced ng – fono ('meeting, assembly') is pronounced fongo; ono (the numeral 'six') is pronounced ongo; māʻona ('satisfied, full') is pronounced māʻonga.

=== Oratorical register ===
Historically and culturally, an important form of the Samoan language is oratory, a ceremonial language sometimes referred to in publications as 'chiefly language', or gagana faʻaaloalo ('dignified language') which incorporates classical Samoan terms and prose as well as a different set of vocabulary, which is tied to the roles of orator chiefs (tulāfale) and 'speechmaking' (failāuga) that remains part of the culture's continuing indigenous matai system of governance and social organization. The gagana faʻaaloalo ('polite speech') register is used by lower-ranking people to address people of higher status, such as their family matai chief, government officials, or clergy. It is also the formal register used among chiefs during ceremonial occasions and social rites such as funerals, weddings, chiefly title bestowals and village council meetings.

It is not common for entire conversations to be held in chiefly register, and the "dignified language" is used mainly in making formal introductions between individuals, opening and concluding formal meetings, and executing ceremonial tasks (such as the ʻava ceremony). It is also considered proper to use the "polite" language when praying. Untitled people (those without matai chief titles) who are unfamiliar with each other will often greet each other in chiefly register as a common courtesy, while familiar individuals frequently use chiefly addresses in jest (as in humorously addressing friends with talofa lava lau afioga – 'respectful greetings your highness' – instead of the more colloquial malo sole! – 'hey man!').

Examples of "polite" word variants according to social rank:

| English | Common term | In relation to a "High Chief" | In relation to a "Talking Chief" | In relation to a "Tufuga" artisan/builder |
|---|---|---|---|---|
| house | fale | māota | laoa | apisā |
| wife | toʻalua, avā | faletua, masiofo | tausi | meanaʻi |
| dog | maile | taʻifau | ʻuli | |
| you | ʻoe | lau susuga, lau afioga | lau tofā | mataisau, agaiotupu |
| welcome, greeting | tālofa, mālo | susu mai, afio mai | maliu mai, sosopo mai | |
| to sit | nofo | afio | alāla | |
| to eat | ʻai | tausami, talisua, talialo | taumafa | |
| to drink | inu | taute | taumafa | |
| to bathe | tāʻele | ʻauʻau, faʻamalu, penapena | faʻamalu, ʻauʻau | |
| pillow, headrest | ʻali | lalago | āluga | |
| grave, tomb | tuʻugamau, tia | loa, lagi, lagomau, ʻoliʻolisaga | alālafagamau | |
| kava | ʻava | agatonu, fanua, uta, lupesina, lātasi | agatonu, fanua, uta, lupesina, lātasi | |
| garden, plantation | faʻatoʻaga | faʻeleʻeleaga | velevelega | |
| to meet, to receive a guest | feiloaʻi | fesilafaʻi | fetapaʻi | |
| speech, sermon | lauga | malelega, saunoaga, tuleiga, tānoa | fetalaiga, lafolafoga, moe, tuʻu | |
| to die | oti, mate, maliu | tuʻumalo | usufono | |
| to look, to see | vaʻai | silasila, silafaga | māimoa | tagaʻi |

Another polite form of speech in "polite" Samoan includes terms and phrases of self-abasement that are used by the speaker in order to show respect and flatter the listener. For example when praising the child of another woman, a mother might politely refer to her own children as ui (lit. 'piglets'); in order to emphasize the beauty of a fine tapa cloth, the presenter might refer to it as a simple vala ('plain cloth'); the weaver of an especially fine mat might call it launiu ('coconut leaf') or lā ('sail cloth') in order to not appear boastful. Overshadowing the dignity or prestige of higher-ranking individuals is a grave offense in Samoan culture, so words are chosen very carefully to express individual feelings in a way that acknowledges relative statuses within social hierarchy.

== Alphabet ==
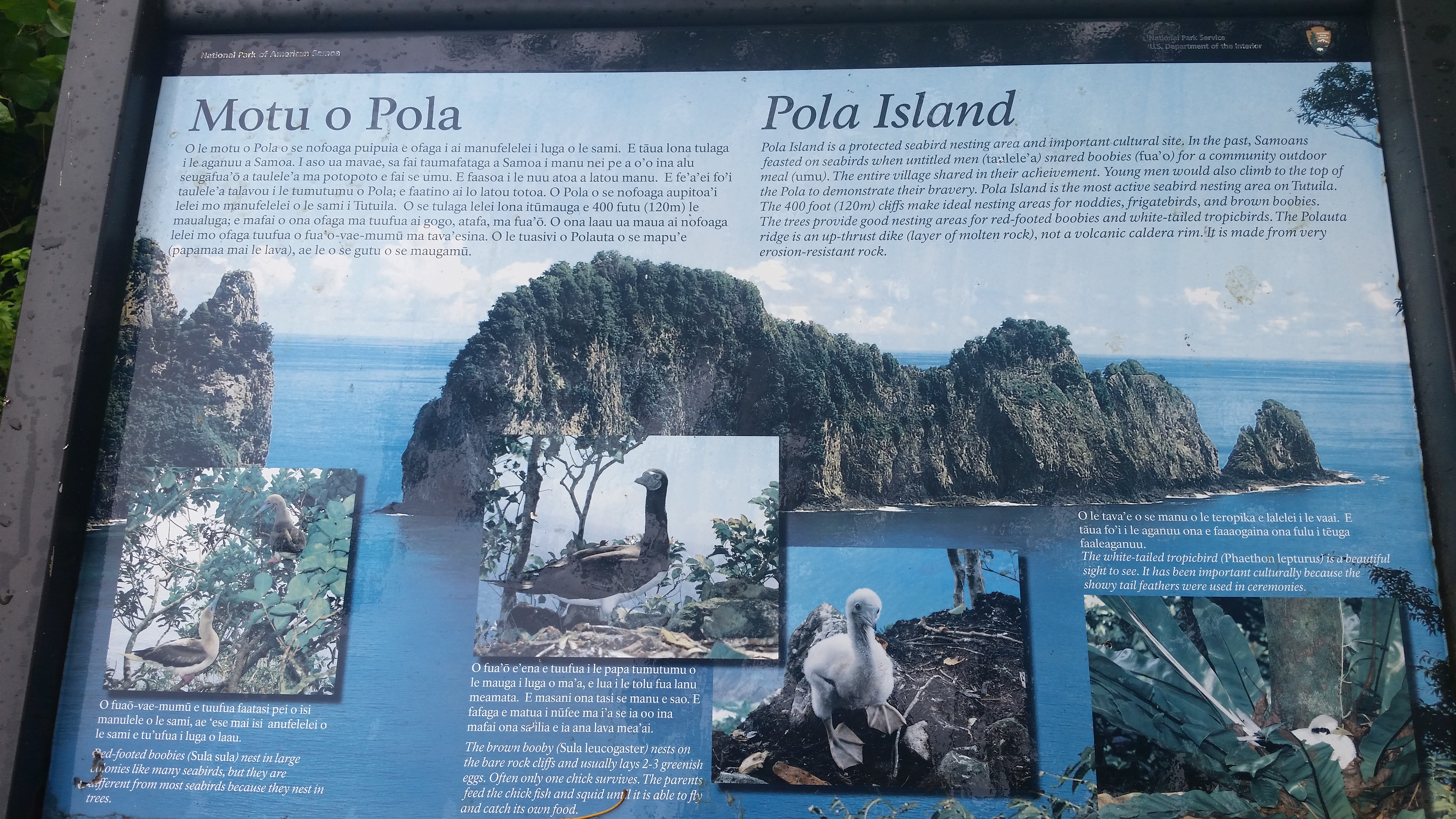
Bilingual sign in Vatia, American Samoa

Encounters with Europeans began in the 1700s, followed by the era of colonialism in the Pacific. Samoan was only a spoken language until the early to mid-1800s when Christian missionaries began documenting the spoken language for religious texts and introducing the Latin script for writing. In 1834, an orthography of the language was distributed by the London Missionary Society, which also set up a printing press by 1839. The first complete Bible (Tusi Paʻia, 'Sacred Book') in Samoan was completed and published in 1862.

The first problem that faced the missionaries in Polynesia was that of learning the language of the island, which they intended to convert to Christianity. The second was that of identifying the sounds in the local languages with the symbols employed in their own languages to establish alphabets for recording the spelling of native words. Having established more-or-less satisfactory alphabets and spelling, teaching the indigenous people how to write and read their own language was next necessary. A printing press, with the alphabet keys used only English, was part of the mission equipment, and it was possible not only to translate and write out portions of the Bible scriptures, and hymns in the local language but also to print them for use as texts in teaching. Thus, the missionaries introduced writing for the first time within Polynesia, were the first printers and established the first schools in villages.

The alphabet proper consists of only 15 letters: 5 vowels, a e i o u, and 10 consonants, f g l m n p s t v ʻ. In addition, a macron (faʻamamafa) written over a vowel indicates the five long vowels, ā ē ī ō ū, as in manu 'animal', mānu 'float, afloat'. The ʻokina ʻ (koma liliu, a reversed apostrophe) indicates the glottal stop, as in many other Polynesian languages. For typographic convenience, the ʻokina is often replaced by a simple apostrophe, '. The additional letters h, k, r are used in foreign loanwords, apart from the single interjection puke(ta)! 'gotcha!'; although the sound [k] is found in native words in colloquial speech, it is spelled t. The letter g represents a velar nasal, as in the English word sing, rather than a voiced velar stop, as in the English go. Thus, the correct pronunciation of Pago Pago is [ˈpaŋo ˈpaŋo].

The first grammar and dictionary of the Samoan language, A Grammar and Dictionary of the Samoan Language, with English and Samoan Vocabulary, was written by Reverend George Pratt in 1862. Pratt's valuable Samoan dictionary records many old words of special interest, specialist terminology, archaic words and names in Samoan tradition. It contains sections on Samoan proverbs and poetry, and an extensive grammatical sketch. Pratt was a missionary for the London Missionary Society and lived for 40 years in Matautu on the island of Savaiʻi.

== Vocabulary ==
=== Numbers ===
The cardinal numerals are:

| Numeral | Samoan | English |
|---|---|---|
| 0 | noa, selo (English loanword) | zero |
| 1 | tasi | one |
| 2 | lua | two |
| 3 | tolu | three |
| 4 | fa | four |
| 5 | lima | five |
| 6 | ono | six |
| 7 | fitu | seven |
| 8 | valu | eight |
| 9 | iva | nine |
| 10 | sefulu | ten |
| 11 | sefulu ma le tasi, sefulu tasi | eleven |
| 12 | sefulu ma le lua, sefulu lua | twelve |
| 20 | luafulu, lua sefulu | twenty |
| 30 | tolugafulu, tolu sefulu | thirty |
| 40 | fagafulu, fa sefulu | forty |
| 50 | limagafulu, lima sefulu | fifty |
| 60 | onogafulu, ono sefulu | sixty |
| 70 | fitugafulu, fitu sefulu | seventy |
| 80 | valugafulu, valu sefulu | eighty |
| 90 | ivagafulu, iva sefulu | ninety |
| 100 | selau, lau | one hundred |
| 200 | lua lau, lua selau | two hundred |
| 300 | tolugalau, tolu selau | three hundred |
| 1000 | afe | one thousand |
| 2000 | lua afe | two thousand |
| 10,000 | mano, sefulu afe | ten thousand |
| 100,000 | Selau afe | one hundred thousand |
| 1,000,000 | miliona (English loanword) | one million |

The term mano was an utmost limit until the adoption of loan words like miliona ('million') and piliona ('billion'). Otherwise, quantities beyond mano were referred to as manomano or ilu; that is, 'innumerable'.

The prefix faʻa is also used to indicate the number of times. For example: faʻatolu 'three times'; faʻafia? 'how many times?'

The prefix lona or le indicates sequential numbering, as in lona lua ('second'), lona tolu ('third'), le fa ('fourth'); muamua or uluaʻi denote 'first'. Familial sequence was denoted with terms such as ulumatua ('eldest'), uiʻi ('youngest'), and ogatotonu ('middle child'); first and last born were also deemed honorifically, pa le manava ('opening the womb') and pupuni le manava ('sealing the womb'), respectively.

To denote the number of persons, the term toʻa is used. For example: E toʻafitu tagata e o i le pasi ('Seven people are going/travelling by bus')

The suffix lau is used when formally counting fish, in reference to the customary plaiting of fish in leaves (lau) before cooking. For example: tolu lau 'three fish'

There are also formal prefixes or suffixes used in the chiefly register when counting different species of fish, taro, yams, banana, chicken, pork, and other foodstuffs.

=== Similarities to other Austronesian languages ===
Despite the geographical distance, there are many shared words between different Austronesian languages. Below is a list of examples from 4 other Malayo-Polynesian languages: Tongan, Hawaiian, Maanyan, Malay.

| | Samoan | Tongan | Hawaiian | Maanyan | Malay |
|---|---|---|---|---|---|
| Hello | alofa, talofa | mālō e lelei | aloha | | |
| Sky | lagi /laŋi/ | langi | lani /lani/ | langit | langit |
| North Wind | toʻelau | tokelau | koʻolau | | |
| Zero | noa /nɵʊə/, selo | noa | ʻole | | kosong, sifar, nol |
| One | tasi /ˈtasi/ | taha | ʻekahi | isa | satu, esa |
| Two | lua /luwɔ/ | ua | ʻelua | ruʻeh | dua |
| Three | tolu /ˈtolu/ | tolu /ˈtolu/ | ʻekolu | telu | tiga, telu (Old Malay) |
| Four | fa /faː/ | fa /faː/ | ʻehā | epat | empat |
| Five | lima /lima/ | nima | ʻelima | dime | lima |
| Six | ono /ˈono/ | /ˈo.no/ | ʻeono | enem | enam |
| Seven | fitu /ˈfitu/ | fitu | ʻehiku | pitu | tujuh |
| Eight | valu /vəlu/ | valu | ʻewalu, ʻawalu | walu | (de)lapan |
| Nine | iva /ˈiva/ | hiva | ʻeiwa, iwa, ʻaiwa | suey | sembilan |
| Ten | sefulu /sɛfɵlɵ/ | hongofulu | ʻumi | sapuluh | sepuluh |

=== Language preservation ===
Though it is not the primary language of a number of nations outside of Samoa, there is an effort by the descendants of Samoans to learn the native language of their ancestors and to better understand their origins and history. Much like any language, a shift is occurring in the way words are spoken and pronounced, especially as Samoans further integrate with other languages. Most looking to learn Samoan are forced to turn to written materials instead of living examples. To preserve the language, linguists must use diacritical marks. Without them, the actual pronunciations of words quickly become altered and lost. The marks are commonly found before, under and above letters in words and are especially helpful for students and non-native speakers to realize the difference the vowels and glottal stops can make in the pronunciation of words.

Examples include:

| Samoan with marking | Meaning | Samoan without marking | Meaning |
|---|---|---|---|
| sa‘u | (one of) my | sau | (one of) your |
| mo‘u | (for) me | mou | (for) you |
| lo‘u | my | lou | your |

Below is another example of a sentence with and without diacritical marks from the Samoan Bible (O le tusi paia, o le Feagaiga Tuai ma le Feagaiga fou lea) [1]:

[Original] Faauta, ua e le foai mai ia te au ...

[With diacritics] Faʻauta ʻua ʻe lē fōaʻi mai iā te aʻu ...

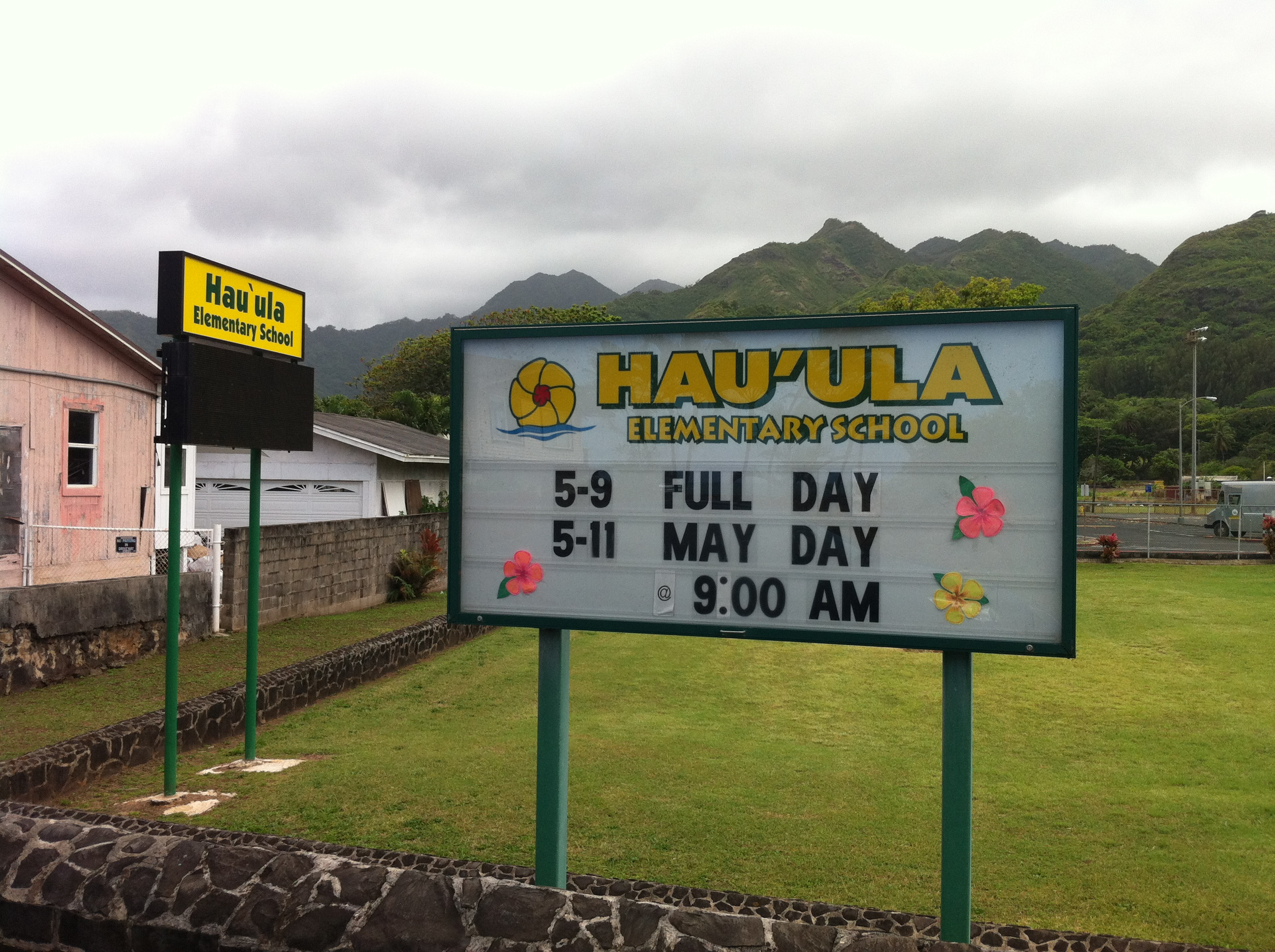
Sign with diacritic mark for Hauʻula elementary school in Hawaii

Samoan diacritical marks may seem confusing at first due to the way the language shifts based on context. Also, the mixed use of diacritical marks in literature and even within the same publication can surprise non-native speakers. This is evident in the Bible translation created by early missionaries and Reverend George Pratt which features markings in some words and not others. Part of it was due to the need to save time on the writing and typesetting and to use the markings as a guideline. Much like the Bible helped improve literacy and understanding of the language throughout Samoan communities, written works continue to be important in much the same way today.

The use of the diacritical marks are not only prevalent in Samoan but also other Polynesian languages, such as Hawaiian, where similar pronunciation losses exist. Since native speakers understand how a word should be pronounced without the markings, words are commonly written and accepted with the markings absent. To prevent the loss of correct pronunciations, however, language preservation groups and the Samoan and Hawaiian governments, are taking measure to include diacritical markings in signage, television programs, school materials and printed media.

== Sample text ==
Article 1 of the Universal Declaration of Human Rights in Samoan:

O tagata soifua uma ua saoloto lo latou fananau mai, ma e tutusa o latou tulaga aloaia faapea a latou aia tatau. Ua faaeeina atu i a latou le mafaufau lelei ma le loto fuatiaifo ma e tatau ona faatino le agaga faauso i le va o le tasi i le isi.

Article 1 of the Universal Declaration of Human Rights in English:

All human beings are born free and equal in dignity and rights. They are endowed with reason and conscience and should act towards one another in a spirit of brotherhood.

== See also ==
- Faʻamatai – Samoa's chiefly matai system which includes aliʻi and orator chief statuses
- Samoan literature
- Samoan plant names, which includes plants used in traditional Samoan medicine.
