= NJL =

NJL may refer to:

- Nordic Journal of Linguistics
- Team NJL Racing
- Nambu–Jona-Lasinio model
- the ISO 639 code for the Nyolge language
