= Catherine O. Ringen =

American phonologist and professor emerita

- Born: Catherine Oleson Ringen; 1943 (age 82–83)

Academic background
- Education: Indiana University Bloomington
- Thesis: Vowel Harmony: Theoretical Implications (1975)

Academic work
- Discipline: Linguist
- Sub-discipline: Phonology
- Institutions: University of Iowa

Catherine Ringen is an American phonologist and professor emerita of linguistics at the University of Iowa. She is best known for her research on vowel harmony, especially in Finno-Ugric languages, and on laryngeal contrasts in obstruents, in particular in Germanic languages.

Ringen earned her Ph.D. in Linguistics from Indiana University Bloomington in 1975, with a dissertation entitled "Vowel Harmony: Theoretical Implications." After her PhD she took up a position at the University of Iowa Linguistics Department, where she stayed until her retirement in 2015.

Ringen was co-editor of the Nordic Journal of Linguistics from 2001–2015. She served on the Executive Committee of the Linguistic Society of America from 2008–2010. She was a member of the scientific committee of the Manchester Phonology Meeting from 2004 to 2014.

== Key publications ==
W. van Dommelen and Catherine O. Ringen. 2013. “Quantity and laryngeal contrasts in Norwegian,” Journal of Phonetics, 41, pages 479-490.

Helgason, Pétur, and Catherine O. Ringen. 2008. Voicing and aspiration in Swedish stops. Journal of Phonetics 36, pages 607–628.

Jessen, Michael and Catherine O. Ringen. 2002. Laryngeal features in German. Phonology 19, pages 189–218.

Ringen, Catherine O. and Orvokki Heinämäki. 1999. Variation in Finnish Vowel Harmony: An OT Account. Natural Language and Linguistic Theory 17, pages 303–337.

Ringen, Catherine O. and Miklós Kontra. 1989. Hungarian neutral vowels. Lingua 78, pages 181–191.

Ringen, Catherine O. and Robert M. Vago. 1998. Hungarian vowel harmony in Optimality Theory. Phonology 15, pages 393–416.
