= Samoan Braille =

Braille system for Samoan

- Script type: alphabet
- Print basis: Samoan alphabet
- Languages: Samoan

Related scripts
- Parent systems: Braille: English Braille; Samoan Braille

Samoan Braille is the braille alphabet of the Samoan language. It is a subset of the basic braille alphabet,

⠁ (braille pattern dots-1)	⠑ (braille pattern dots-15)	⠋ (braille pattern dots-124)	⠛ (braille pattern dots-1245)	⠊ (braille pattern dots-24)	⠇ (braille pattern dots-123)	⠍ (braille pattern dots-134)	⠝ (braille pattern dots-1345)	⠕ (braille pattern dots-135)	⠏ (braille pattern dots-1234)	⠎ (braille pattern dots-234)	⠞ (braille pattern dots-2345)	⠥ (braille pattern dots-136)	⠧ (braille pattern dots-1236)	⠓ (braille pattern dots-125)	⠅ (braille pattern dots-13)	⠗ (braille pattern dots-1235)
a	e	f	g	i	l	m	n	o	p	s	t	u	v	h	k	r

supplemented by an additional letter ⠰ to mark long vowels:

⠰ (braille pattern dots-56) ⠁ (braille pattern dots-1)	⠰ (braille pattern dots-56) ⠑ (braille pattern dots-15)	⠰ (braille pattern dots-56) ⠊ (braille pattern dots-24)	⠰ (braille pattern dots-56) ⠕ (braille pattern dots-135)	⠰ (braille pattern dots-56) ⠥ (braille pattern dots-136)
ā	ē	ī	ō	ū

Unlike print Samoan, which has a special letter ʻokina for the glottal stop, Samoan Braille uses the apostrophe ⠈, which behaves as punctuation rather than as a consonant. (See Hawaiian Braille, which has a similar setup.)

Samoan Braille has an unusual punctuation mark, a reduplication sign ⠙. This is used to indicate that a word is reduplicated, as in ⠎⠑⠛⠊⠙ segisegi "twilight".
