= Coronal consonant =

Type of consonant sound involving tongue placement

Coronals are consonants articulated with the flexible front part of the tongue. Among places of articulation, only the coronal consonants can be divided into as many active articulation types: apical (using the tip of the tongue), laminal (using the blade of the tongue), or subapical (using the underside of the tongue); as well as different postalveolar articulations (some of which also involve the back of the tongue as an articulator): palato-alveolar, alveolo-palatal and retroflex. Only the front of the tongue (coronal) has such dexterity among the major places of articulation, allowing such variety of distinctions. Coronals have another dimension, tongue shape, to produce a variety among sibilants in combination with the orientations above.

== Places of articulation ==
Coronal places of articulation include the dental consonants at the upper teeth, the alveolar consonants at the upper gum (the alveolar ridge), the various postalveolar consonants (including domed palato-alveolar, laminal alveolo-palatal, and apical retroflex) just behind that, the subapical retroflex consonants curled back against the hard palate, and linguolabial consonants with the tongue against the upper lip. Alveolo-palatal and linguolabial consonants sometimes behave as dorsal and labial consonants, respectively, rather than as coronals.

Coronal sibilants
		IPA symbol	meaning
place of articulation	passive (mouth)	⟨s̪⟩	dental
place of articulation	passive (mouth)	⟨s̟⟩	advanced (denti-alveolar)
place of articulation	passive (mouth)	⟨s͇⟩	alveolar
place of articulation	passive (mouth)	⟨s̠⟩	retracted (postalveolar)
place of articulation	active (tongue)	⟨s̺⟩	apical
place of articulation	active (tongue)	⟨s̻⟩	laminal
place of articulation	active (tongue)	⟨ʂ⟩	retroflex
place of articulation	secondary	⟨sʲ⟩	palatalized coronal
place of articulation	secondary	⟨ɕ⟩	alveolo-palatal
place of articulation	secondary	⟨ʃ⟩	palato-alveolar
place of articulation	secondary	⟨sʷ⟩	labialized coronal
place of articulation	secondary	⟨sˠ⟩	velarized coronal
place of articulation	secondary	⟨sˤ⟩	pharyngealized coronal
voice-onset time		⟨sʰ⟩	aspirated coronal

== Examples ==
=== Arabic ===
In Arabic and Maltese philology, the sun letters represent coronal consonants.

=== European ===
European coronal consonants
IPA symbol	Name of the consonant	Language	Example	IPA
⟨z⟩	Voiced alveolar sibilant	English	zoo	/zuː/
⟨s⟩	Voiceless alveolar sibilant	English	sea	/siː/
⟨ð⟩	Voiced dental fricative	English	that	/ðæt/
⟨θ⟩	Voiceless dental fricative	English	thud	/θʌd/
⟨ʒ⟩	Voiced palato-alveolar fricative	English	vision	/ˈvɪʒən/
⟨ʃ⟩	Voiceless palato-alveolar fricative	English	she	/ʃiː/
⟨n⟩	Alveolar nasal	English	name	/neɪm/
⟨d⟩	Voiced alveolar plosive	English	day	/deɪ/
⟨t⟩	Voiceless alveolar plosive	English	tea	/tiː/
⟨ɹ⟩	Alveolar approximant	English	reef	/ɹiːf/
⟨l⟩	Alveolar lateral approximant	English	lift	/lɪft/
⟨r⟩	Alveolar trill	Spanish	perro	/ˈpero/
⟨ɾ⟩	Alveolar flap	Spanish	pero	/ˈpeɾo/

=== Australian Aboriginal ===
In Australian Aboriginal languages, coronals contrast with peripheral consonants.

Australian coronal consonants
	Laminal		Apical	
	Alveopalatal	Dental	Alveolar	Retroflex
Stop	c ~ t̠ʲ	t̪	t	ʈ
Nasal	ɲ ~ n̠ʲ	n̪	n	ɳ
Lateral	ʎ ~ l̠ʲ	l̪	l	ɭ

== Lack of coronals ==
Northwest Mekeo is the only known language with no coronal phonemes, violating what was previously thought to be a linguistic universal.

== See also ==
- Peripheral consonants, the set of non-coronal consonants
- Apical consonant
- Laminal consonant
- Subapical consonant
- Place of articulation
- List of phonetics topics

Place →	Labial					Coronal										Dorsal					Laryngeal			
Manner ↓	Bilabial		Labiodental		Linguolabial		Dental		Alveolar		Postalveolar		Retroflex		(Alveolo-)palatal		Velar		Uvular		Pharyngeal/epiglottal		Glottal	
Nasal	m̥	m	ɱ̊	ɱ		n̼	n̪̊	n̪	n̥	n	n̠̊	n̠	ɳ̊	ɳ	ɲ̊	ɲ	ŋ̊	ŋ	ɴ̥	ɴ				
Plosive	p	b	p̪	b̪	t̼	d̼	t̪	d̪	t	d			ʈ	ɖ	c	ɟ	k	ɡ	q	ɢ	ʡ		ʔ	
Sibilant affricate							t̪s̪	d̪z̪	ts	dz	t̠ʃ	d̠ʒ	tʂ	dʐ	tɕ	dʑ								
Non-sibilant affricate	pɸ	bβ	p̪f	b̪v			t̪θ	d̪ð	tɹ̝̊	dɹ̝	t̠ɹ̠̊˔	d̠ɹ̠˔			cç	ɟʝ	kx	ɡɣ	qχ	ɢʁ	ʡʜ	ʡʢ	ʔh	
Sibilant fricative							s̪	z̪	s	z	ʃ	ʒ	ʂ	ʐ	ɕ	ʑ								
Non-sibilant fricative	ɸ	β	f	v	θ̼	ð̼	θ	ð	θ̠	ð̠	ɹ̠̊˔	ɹ̠˔	ɻ̊˔	ɻ˔	ç	ʝ	x	ɣ	χ	ʁ	ħ	ʕ	h	ɦ
Approximant		β̞		ʋ				ð̞		ɹ		ɹ̠		ɻ		j		ɰ						˷
Tap/flap		ⱱ̟		ⱱ					ɾ̥	ɾ			ɽ̊	ɽ						ɢ̆		ʡ̮		
Trill	ʙ̥	ʙ							r̥	r		r̠	ɽ̊r̥	ɽr					ʀ̥	ʀ	ʜ	ʢ		
Lateral affricate									tɬ	dɮ			tꞎ	d𝼅	c𝼆	ɟʎ̝	k𝼄	ɡʟ̝						
Lateral fricative							ɬ̪		ɬ	ɮ			ꞎ	𝼅	𝼆	ʎ̝	𝼄	ʟ̝						
Lateral approximant								l̪	l̥	l		l̠	ɭ̊	ɭ	ʎ̥	ʎ	ʟ̥	ʟ		ʟ̠				
Lateral tap/flap									ɺ̥	ɺ			𝼈̊	𝼈		ʎ̮		ʟ̆						

		BL	LD	D	A	PA	RF	P	V	U
Implosive	Voiced	ɓ			ɗ		ᶑ	ʄ	ɠ	ʛ
Implosive	Voiceless	ɓ̥			ɗ̥		ᶑ̊	ʄ̊	ɠ̊	ʛ̥
Ejective	Stop	pʼ			tʼ		ʈʼ	cʼ	kʼ	qʼ
Ejective	Affricate		p̪fʼ	t̪θʼ	tsʼ	t̠ʃʼ	tʂʼ	tɕʼ	kxʼ	qχʼ
Ejective	Fricative	ɸʼ	fʼ	θʼ	sʼ	ʃʼ	ʂʼ	ɕʼ	xʼ	χʼ
Ejective	Lateral affricate				tɬʼ			c𝼆ʼ	k𝼄ʼ	q𝼄ʼ
Ejective	Lateral fricative				ɬʼ					
Click (top: velar; bottom: uvular)	Tenuis	kʘ qʘ		kǀ qǀ	kǃ qǃ		k𝼊 q𝼊	kǂ qǂ		
Click (top: velar; bottom: uvular)	Voiced	ɡʘ ɢʘ		ɡǀ ɢǀ	ɡǃ ɢǃ		ɡ𝼊 ɢ𝼊	ɡǂ ɢǂ		
Click (top: velar; bottom: uvular)	Nasal	ŋʘ ɴʘ		ŋǀ ɴǀ	ŋǃ ɴǃ		ŋ𝼊 ɴ𝼊	ŋǂ ɴǂ	ʞ	
Click (top: velar; bottom: uvular)	Tenuis lateral				kǁ qǁ					
Click (top: velar; bottom: uvular)	Voiced lateral				ɡǁ ɢǁ					
Click (top: velar; bottom: uvular)	Nasal lateral				ŋǁ ɴǁ					
