= Even Hovdhaugen =

Norwegian linguist and professor (1941–2018)

- Born: June 21, 1941; Oslo, Norway
- Died: October 16, 2018 (aged 77); Bærum, Norway
- Father: Einar Hovdhaugen

Academic background
- Education: University of Oslo

Even Hovdhaugen (June 21, 1941 – October 16, 2018) was a Norwegian linguist. He became a professor of general linguistics at the University of Oslo in 1974. He was an expert in Polynesian languages.

Hovdhaugen was born in Oslo, the son of the politician Einar Hovdhaugen. He received his master's degree in classical philology and comparative Indo-European linguistics from the University of Oslo in 1966. He carried out field research in Hungary, Turkey, the USSR, Mongolia, Peru, Chile, Samoa, Tokelau, and the Solomon Islands. He produced extensive research and published textbooks for both university and high school use. He authored grammars of Samoan and Tokelauan.

In 1995 he was a guest professor at the University of Copenhagen, and from 1978 to 1980 he served as the first editor of the Nordic Journal of Linguistics. He held several key positions within university administration and research, including dean of the Faculty of Arts in Oslo. He headed the Institute for Comparative Research in Human Culture from 1986 to 1991. In 1992 he received the Fridtjof Nansen Award of Excellence and the Norwegian Research Council for Science and the Humanities (NAVF) Prize for Excellence.

He resided in Bærum. He died on October 16, 2018.

== Selected works ==
- Transformasjonell generativ grammatikk (Transformational Generative Grammar, 1969, 1971)
- Foundations of Western Linguistics (1982)
- From the Land of N'afanua. Samoan Oral Texts in Transcription with Translation, Notes and Vocabulary (1987)
- A Handbook of the Tokelau Language (with Ingjerd Hoëm, Consulata Mahina Iosefo, and Arnfinn Muruvik Vonen, 1989)
- Ko te kalama moamoa Tokelau (with Ingjerd Hoëm and Arnfinn Muruvik Vonen, 1989)
- Kupu mai te Tutolu. Tokelau Oral Literature (with Ingjerd Hoëm and Arnfinn Muruvik Vonen, 1992)
- Samoan Reference Grammar (with Ulrike Mosel, 1992)
- (editor) ...and the Word was God. Missionary Linguistics and Missionary Grammar (1996)
- The History of Linguistics in the Nordic Countries (with Fred Karlsson, Carol Henriksen, and Bengt Sigurd, 2000)
