= Einar Hovdhaugen =

Norwegian politician

Einar Hovdhaugen (26 February 1908 – 1 July 1996) was a Norwegian politician for the Centre Party.

He was born in Ringebu Municipality.

He was elected to the Norwegian Parliament from Oppland in 1958, and was re-elected on two occasions. He had previously served as a deputy representative in the periods 1945–1949 and 1954–1957. Hovdhaugen was a member of the municipal council for Ringebu Municipality in the periods 1945–1947 and 1951–1955. He was also a Deputy Member of the Parliamentary Assembly of the Council of Europe from 1959 to 1960. Hovdhaugen wrote 18 books during his lifetime, mainly about the local history of Ringebu, such as the homestead period and emigration to the United States.

Hovdhaugen was appointed to the Norwegian Nobel Committee in 1973. Following the decision to award the 1973 Nobel Peace Prize to Henry Kissinger and Lê Đức Thọ, Hovdhaugen resigned from the committee in protest, along with fellow committee member Helge Rognlien.

He was the father of the linguist Even Hovdhaugen.
