= Manchester Phonology Meeting =

The Manchester Phonology Meeting (abbreviated and stylised as mfm) is a biennial linguistic conference, held at Hulme Hall in Manchester, in the United Kingdom, from 1993–2018, and at other venues at the University of Manchester from 2019. Submitted abstracts undergo an anonymous peer-review process before being selected for inclusion by an organising committee and international advisory board of prominent linguists. Presentations have, over the years, taken on a broad range of phonological topics, from phonological acquisition and the phonological description of languages to the interfaces between phonology and other subfields of linguistics such as morphology and syntax. The conference was held annually until 2025, when it started being held every two years instead.

Funding for the conference has come from a variety of sources, including the Linguistics Association of Great Britain and the British Academy.
