= Nordic Journal of Linguistics =

- Discipline: Linguistics
- Language: English
- Edited by: Gunnar Ólafur Hansson, Marit Julien, Matti Miestamo

Publication details
- History: 1978–present
- Publisher: Cambridge University Press
- Frequency: Triannual
- Impact factor: 0.182 (2009)

Standard abbreviations
- ISO 4: Nord. J. Linguist.

Indexing
- ISSN: 0332-5865 (print); 1502-4717 (web)
- OCLC no.: 42895574

Links
- Journal homepage; Online access; Online archive

The Nordic Journal of Linguistics is a peer-reviewed academic journal concerned with all branches of linguistics, but paying particular attention to theoretical linguistics and languages used in the Nordic countries. It was established in 1978 by Even Hovdhaugen and is published by Cambridge University Press (since 2003) for the Nordic Association of Linguists. Earlier, it was published by Universitetsforlaget and afterwards Taylor & Francis (2000–2002). It is also supported by the Nordic Publication Committee for Periodicals in the Humanities.

The first editor in chief was Hovdhaugen. From 2001 to 2015, the editors in chief were Catherine O. Ringen (University of Iowa) and Sten Vikner (Aarhus University). From 2015, the editors were Gunnar Ólafur Hansson (University of British Columbia, Canada), Marit Julien (University of Lund, Sweden) and Matti Miestamo (University of Helsinki, Finland). As of 2025, the editors in chief are Ilmari Ivaska, Kari Kinn and Sara Myrberg.

Three issues are published each year, one of them devoted to a special topic.
