= Ulrike Mosel =

Linguist

Ulrike Mosel is a German professor of linguistics and head of the linguistics department at the University of Kiel. She has held these positions since 1995. Mosel is the co-editor and author of nine academic books, including Essentials of Language Documentation with Jost Gippert and Nikolaus Himmelmann. This book is as described as "a landmark" in the field of language documentation.

== Research ==
Mosel's research centers on language documentation in the Pacific, with particular focus on the languages of Western Samoa and Papua New Guinea. She has conducted fieldwork in Rabaul, Western Samoa, and Bougainville.

== Career ==
After completing her first PhD in Munich in Semitic Languages, Assyriology, and Linguistics in 1974, Mosel held assistant professor and research assistant, and research fellow positions before undertaking her second PhD in Munich in Linguistics in 1983. Since then, she has held positions at the Australia National University and Christian Albrechts Universität. Mosel has also served as a consultant for the government of Western Samoa

== Selected publications ==
- 2006 Gippert, Jost, Nikolaus Himmelmmann, and Ulrike Mosel, eds. Essentials of Language Documentation. Berlin: Mouton de Gruyter.
- 1999b Hovdhaugen, Even, and Ulrike Mosel, eds. Negation in Oceanic languages. München: Lincom.
- 1997 Mosel, Ulrike and Ainslie So'o. Say it in Samoan. Canberra: Australian National University Press.
- 1994 Saliba. München: Lincom (Sketch grammar of an Oceanic language spoken in Papua New Guinea, Milne Bay Province).
- 1992 Hovdhaugen, Even, and Ulrike Mosel. Samoan Reference Grammar. Oslo: Scandinavian University Press.
- 1984 Tolai syntax and its historical development. Pacific Linguistics B – 73. Canberra A.N.U. Press (Habilitation Thesis).
- 1980 Tolai and Tok Pisin. The influence of the substratum on the development of New Guinea Pidgin. Pacific Linguistics B – 73. Canberra: : Australian National University Press.
- 1977 'Tolai Texts, Kivung'. Journal of the Linguistic Society of Papua New Guinea. Port Moresby.
- 1975 Die syntaktische Terminologie bei Sibawaih. 2 Bde. Dissertation. München: Uni Fotodruck Frank, Vol.1.
