= Languages of Ivory Coast =

Languages of the Ivory Coast
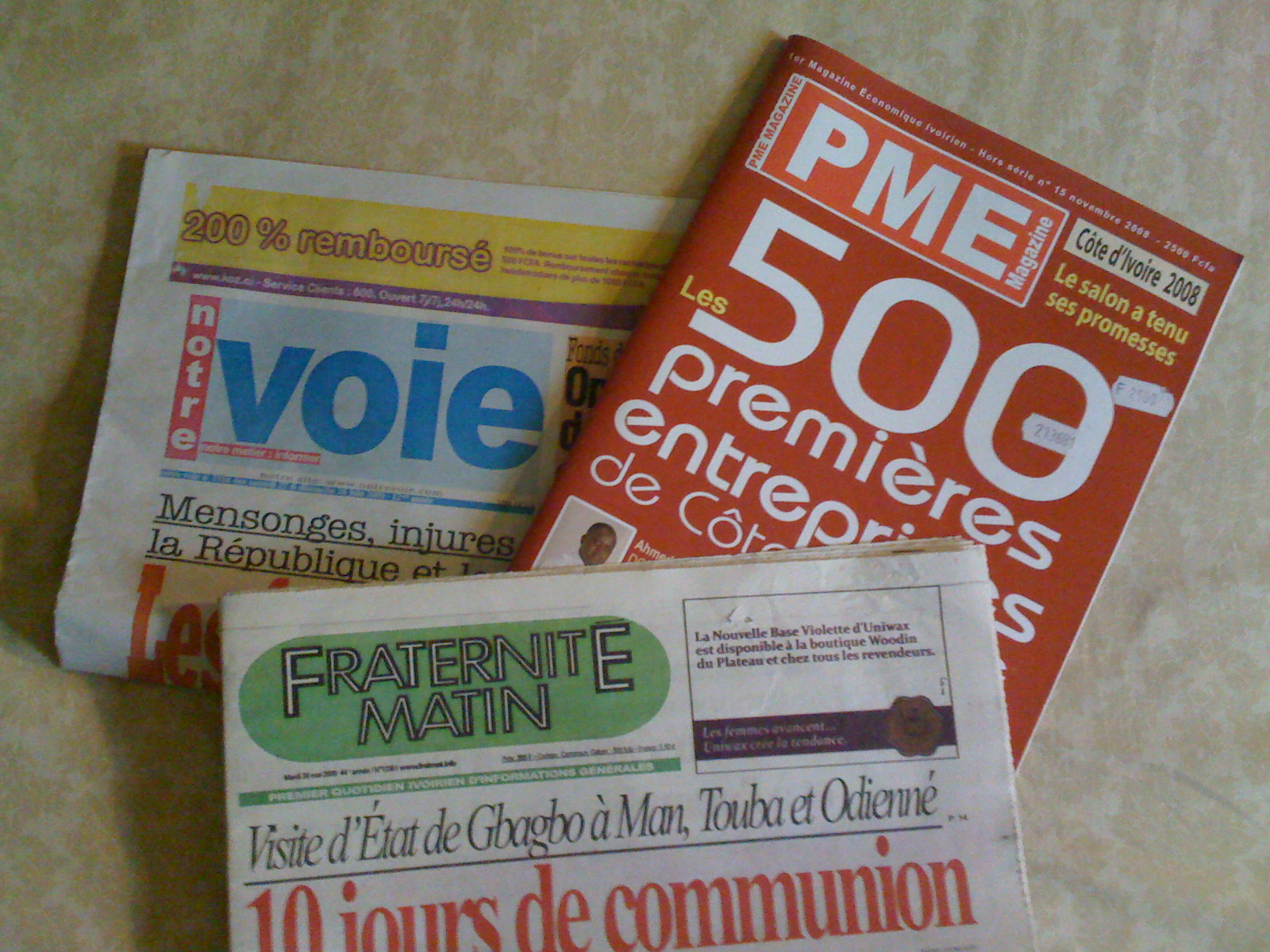
- Ivorian newspapers, written in French
- Official: French
- National: About 69 languages: Baoulé, Sénoufo, Yao Una, Agni, Attié (or Akyé), Guéré, Bété, Dyula, Abé, Mahou, Wobé, Lobi, Guro, Mooré
- Vernacular: African French
- Foreign: List: Arabic; English
- Signed: Francophone African Sign Language
- Keyboard layout: French AZERTY

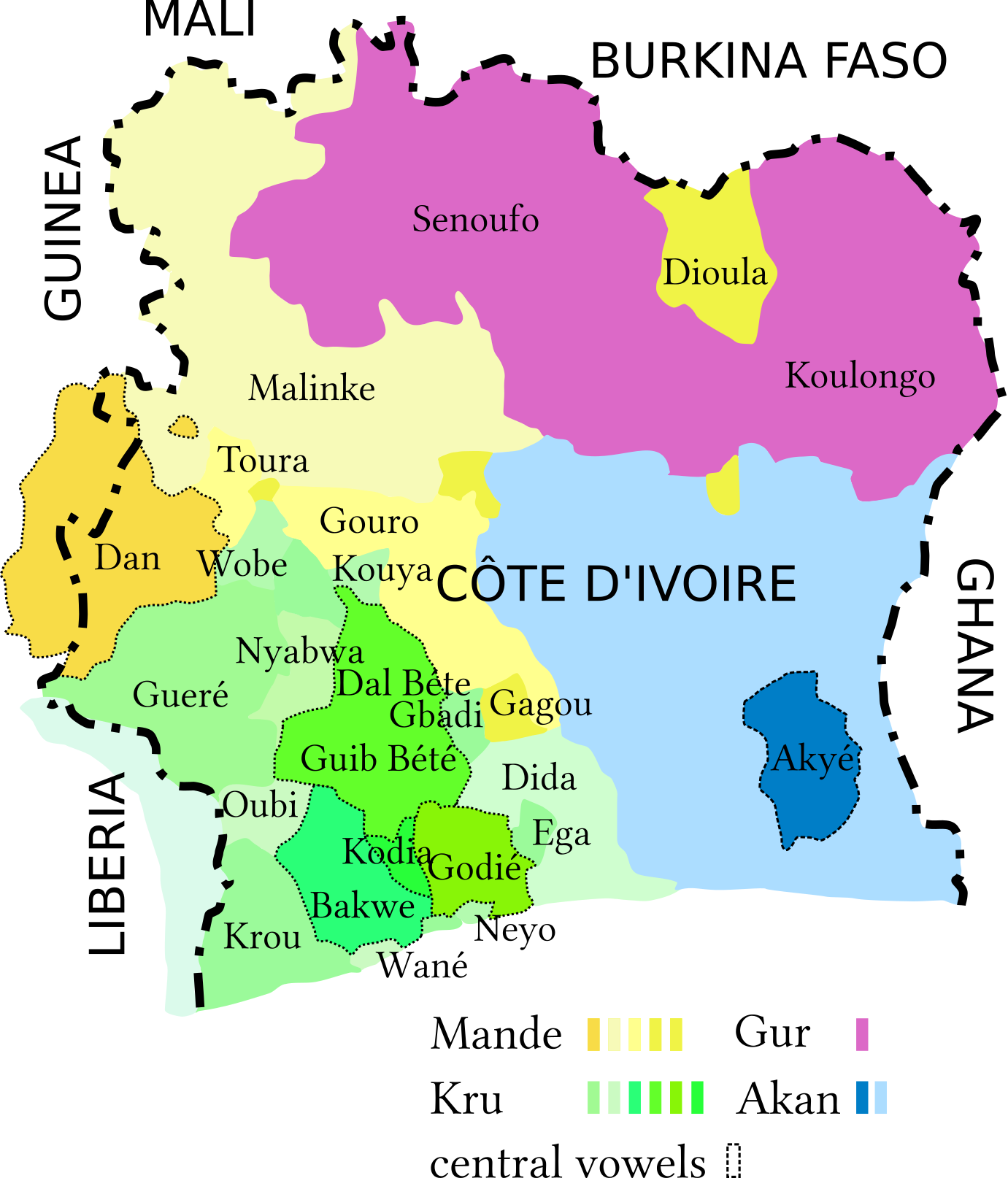
Linguistic map of Ivory Coast: Kru languages in green, Mande languages in yellow, Gur languages in purple, Akan languages in blue

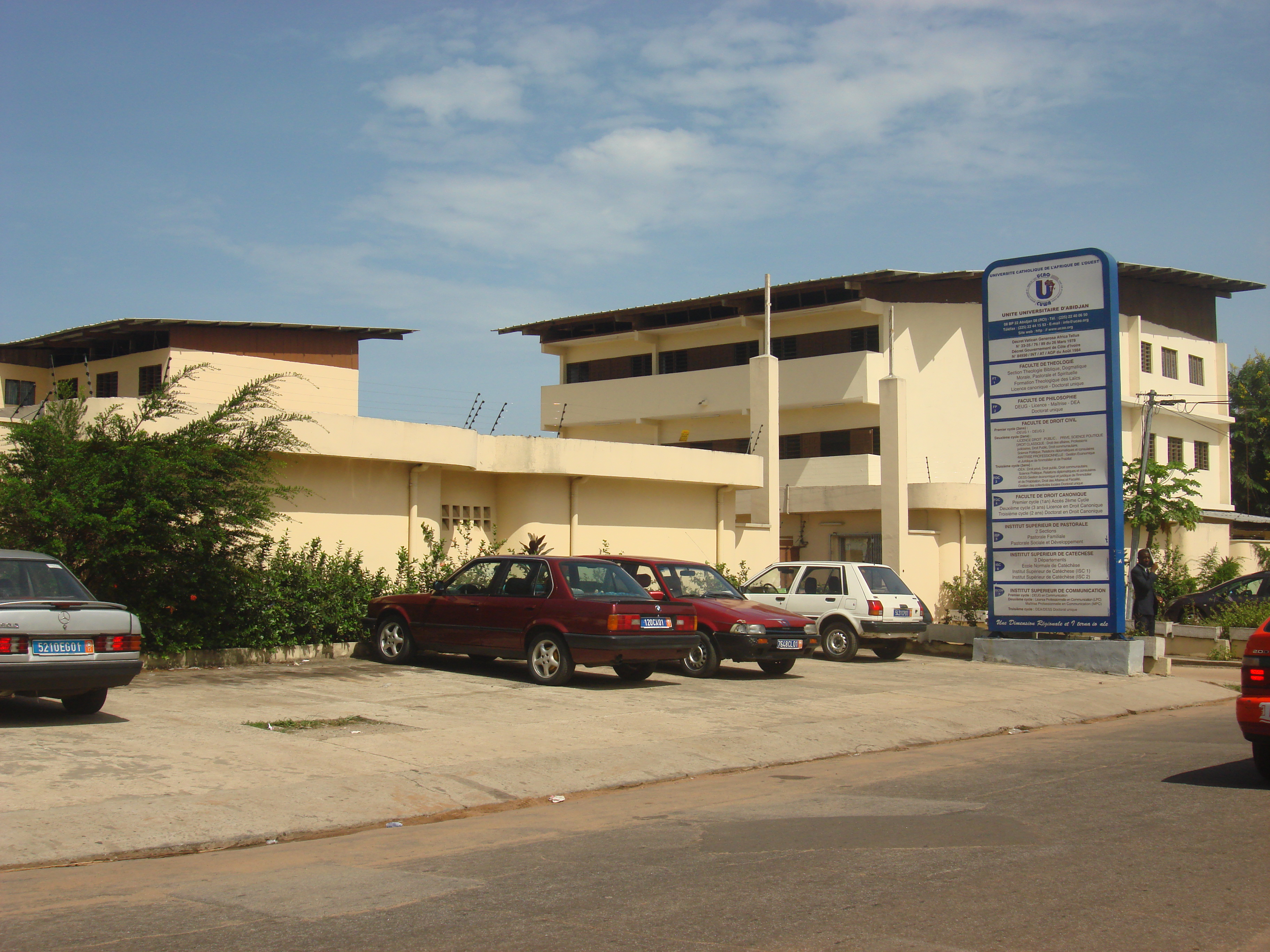
University in Abidjan (Université catholique de l'Afrique de l'ouest à Cocody)

Ivory Coast is a multilingual country with an estimated 69 languages currently spoken. The official language is French. This language is taught in schools and serves as a lingua franca in the country, along with Dioula.

Ivory Coast is a Francophone country; in 2024, an estimated 11.63 million people (36.42% out of a total of 31.93 million) spoke French.

The 70 or so indigenous languages fall into five main branches of the Niger–Congo family. In the southeastern quadrant are Kwa languages, some such as Baoulé and Anyin (2–3 million and 1 million speakers) part of a dialect continuum with Akan in Ghana, others such as Attié (or Akyé) (half a million) are more divergent. Baoulé is spoken east of Lake Kossou and at the capital Yamoussoukro, and Anyi along the Ghanaian border. In the southwestern quadrant are Kru languages, such as Bete and We (Gure/Wobe), half a million apiece, and Dida (a quarter million), related to the languages of Liberia. In the northwest, along the Guinean border and across to Lake Kossou in the center of the country, are Mande languages, such as Dan (1 million speakers) and Guro (half a million, on the lake). The lake and the river Bandama divide the Kwa east of the country from the Kru and Mande west. Across the center north are various Senufo languages, such as Senari (1 million speakers). In the northeast corner, surrounding Comoé National Park, are a quarter million speakers each of Kulango, the Gur language Lobi, and the Mande language Jula (French: Dioula), which is a lingua franca of neighboring Burkina Faso.

There are also three million or so speakers of immigrant languages, mostly from neighboring countries and above all from Burkina Faso. Ethnic tensions in the north between immigrant and native Ivoirians, as well as between the Mande/Senoufo north and the Kru/Kwa south, were a large factor in the Ivorian civil wars.

Education for the deaf in Ivory Coast uses American Sign Language, introduced by the deaf American missionary Andrew Foster.

== Sources ==
- Ethnologue list and map for Ivory Coast
- PanAfrican L10n page on Ivory Coast
- (in French) Linguistic situation in Ivory Coast

== See also ==
- African French
