= Aizi =

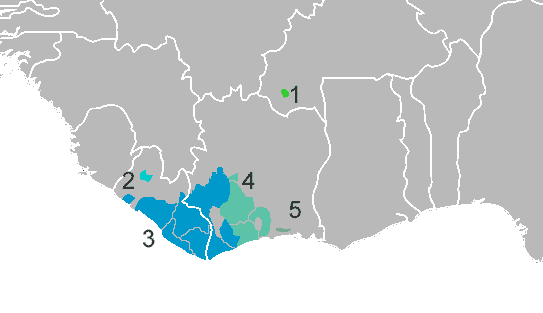
Map showing Kru language distributions with "5" representing Aizi

The Aizi (also known as Ahizi or Kpokpo) are a sub-group of the Kru people. The Aizi inhabit the Ébrié Lagoon in the Ivory Coast. The Aizi languages include Tiagba, Mobu, and Apro.
