= Grebo language =

Kru language of Liberia

Grebo
- Kréébo (Grebo)
- Native to: Liberia
- Native speakers: (390,000 cited 2001) possibly a few Southern Grebo in Ivory Coast, plus refugees
- Language family: Niger–Congo?: Kru; Western Kru; Grebo languages; Grebo

Language codes
- ISO 639-2: grb
- ISO 639-3: grb – inclusive code Individual codes: grj – Southern (including Jabo) grv – Central gbo – Northern gec – Gboloo gry – Barclayville oub – Glio-Ubi
- Glottolog: greb1256

Grebo is a Kru language of Liberia. All of the Grebo languages are referred to as Grebo, though in Ivory Coast, Krumen is the usual name. The Grebo people live in the extreme south-west of Liberia, both on the coast and inland, between the rivers Cavally and Cess.

As in the other Kru languages, tone is extremely important. For instance, né with a high (or high-mid) tone is the first-person pronoun "I", while nè with a low tone is the singular form of "you".

== Phonology ==
=== Consonants ===
		Labial	Alveolar	Palatal	Velar		Labio- velar	Glottal
		Labial	Alveolar	Palatal	plain	lab.	Labio- velar	Glottal
Nasal	voiced	m	n	ɲ	ŋ	ŋʷ	ŋ͡m	
Nasal	voiceless	m̥	n̥					
Plosive	voiceless	p	t	c	k		k͡p	
Plosive	voiced	b	d	ɟ	ɡ		ɡ͡b	
Fricative		f	s					h
Approximant	voiced	w	l	j				
Approximant	voiceless	w̥	l̥					

=== Vowels ===
Oral vowels
	Front		Central	Back	
	plain	ret.	Central	plain	ret.
Close	i			u	
Close-mid	e	e̠		o	o̠
Open-mid	ɛ			ɔ	
Open			a		

Nasal vowels
	Front	Central	Back
Close	ĩ		ũ
Close-mid	ẽ		õ
Open-mid	ɛ̃		ɔ̃
Open		ã	

Vowels /e̠, o̠/ are considered as retracted or "muffled" vowels according to source.
