= Krumen =

Krumen may refer to:

- Krumen people, of Liberia and the Ivory Coast
- Krumen language, their Kru (Niger-Congo) language
