= Gbii language =

Krahn language of Liberia

Gbi and Dorue
- Native to: Liberia
- Native speakers: 12,000 (2020)
- Language family: Niger–Congo?: Atlantic–Congo; Kru; Western; Bassa; Gbi and Dorue

Language codes
- ISO 639-3: ggb
- Glottolog: gbii1242
- ELP: Gbii

The Gbi and Dorue languages, also known as Gbee or Gbi and Dowlu, is similar to the Krahn language of the Niger–Congo language family. It is spoken in northern Liberia which is a district within Nimba County. Its dialects include Gbi, and its three subdialects, Gbasei(or Gbii proper), Kplor and Dorbor, each with 88-92% lexical similarity and cognate similarity with the Central Bassa dialects(Kplor being the highest) representing the Bassa side of the division, and Dowlu, with 2 dialects, Dowlu and Beleto, with82-85% cognate similarity with the Central Bassa dialects(Dowlu being the highest), representing the Krahn side of the division(Doru) and the Dan(Gio) side of the division(Beleto). Gbi has a lexical similarity of 0.78% with the Bassa language. Some Bassa and Krahn speakers claim that it is just a mix of Bassa, Krahn, and sometimes Dan(Gio), but Bassa speakers report most intelligibility.

In 1991, Gbi was spoken by 18,600 people.

== See also ==
- Languages of Africa
