= Krahn language =

Krahn is any of the related languages spoken by the Krahn people:

- Western Krahn language
- Eastern Krahn language
- Southern Krahn language
