= Ega language =

Kwa language of south-central Ivory Coast

Ega
- Native to: Ivory Coast
- Region: near Gly or Gli, Sud-Bandama region
- Native speakers: 2,500 (2001)
- Language family: Niger–Congo?: Atlantic–Congo; Volta-Congo; Kwa; Ega

Language codes
- ISO 639-3: ega
- Glottolog: egaa1242
- ELP: Ega

Ega, also known as Egwa and Diès, is a West African language spoken in south-central Ivory Coast. It appears to be a Kwa language of uncertain affiliation.

== Demographics ==
Ega is spoken in 21 villages near Gly in Diès Canton, Gôh-Djiboua District, Ivory Coast (Bole-Richard 1983: 359). Some villages are Broudougou, Gly, Dairo, Didizo, and Douzaroko. The Ega people are increasing in number, though some are shifting to Dida through intermarriage.

== Documentation ==
A language documentation fieldwork project on Ega was conducted by a team from Universität Bielefeld, Germany (Dafydd Gibbon) and Université Houphouet Boigny, Abidjan, Côte d'Ivoire (Firmin Ahoua) from 2000 to 2003 in cooperation with York University, Canada (Bruce Connell).

== Classification ==
Ega appears to be a divergent Western Kwa language within the Niger–Congo language family spoken in Ivory Coast. It does not appear to belong to any of the traditional branches of Niger–Congo. Blench (2017) classifies Ega as a Western Kwa language that has borrowed from Kru, Gur, and Mande.

== Cultural and economic context ==
Like other Western Kwa languages, traditional story-telling among the Ega people has a fairly strict schedule: after an introduction by the narrator, a well-defined role in the village, the narration proceeds, punctuated by responder's interjection [sɛsɛ], and interspersed with song interludes with the call and response structure of work songs.

The economy of the Ega community is partly horticultural, partly dependent on plantation work. Hunting is practised with nets which are used to enclose an area of several hundred square meters, within which small game such as agouti (Thryonomys swinderianus) are cornered by a group of beaters. The nets resemble the local canoe trawling nets used on the southern Côte d'Ivoire coast about 100km further south, and possibly indicate a history of coastal migration.

== Phonology ==
Ega has twenty-seven consonants. Its stops have a three-way contrast between voiceless, voiced, and implosive.

Consonant phonemes
		Labial	Alveolar	Dorsal		
		Labial	Alveolar	front	plain	labial
Nasal		m	n	ɲ	ŋ	
Plosive	implosive	ɓ	ɗ	ʄ	ɠ	ɠɓ
Plosive	voiced	b	d	ɟ	ɡ	ɡb
Plosive	voiceless	p	t	c	k	kp
Fricative	voiced	v	z			
Fricative	voiceless	f	s		x	
Approximant			l	j		w

There are nine vowels, with ATR contrast: /i̙/, /i̘/, /u̙/, /u̘/, /e̙/, /e̘/, /o̙/, /o̘/, and /a/.

There are three tones: high, mid, and low.
