= KLU (disambiguation) =

KLU may refer to:

- Klagenfurt Airport, the IATA code KLU
- Koninklijke Luchtmacht (KLu), the military aviation branch of the Netherlands Armed Forces
- klu, the ISO 639-3 code for Klao language
- Kühne Logistics University, a state-recognized business school and university based in Hamburg, Germany
