= Grebo languages =

Language family

Grebo
- Geographic distribution: Liberia, Ivory Coast
- Linguistic classification: Niger–Congo?: Atlantic-Congo; Kru; Western Kru; Grebo
- Subdivisions: Glio-Oubi; Krumen; Grebo proper

Language codes
- Glottolog: greb1257

Grebo is a dialect cluster of the Kru languages, spoken by the Grebo people of present-day Liberia and the Krumen of Ivory Coast in West Africa.

== Definition ==
The first African tribal group contacted by European explorers and Americo-Liberian colonists reaching the area of Cape Palmas were the Seaside Grebo, or Glebo. The colonists came to refer to their language as Grebo. In the absence of other qualification, the term Grebo language refers to the Glebo speech variety.

Considerable ambiguity and imprecision continue to exist with respect to the scholarly use of the term Grebo; it is not always clear precisely which variety it is intended to denote. If it is being used as a group term, it is not always clear what is to be included in the group. This imprecision results from several factors:

- The incompleteness of the data;
- Lack of rigor in the classification methodology; and
- The speech area involved is a language continuum.

=== Ethnologue classification ===
Ethnologue subdivides the Grebo branch of Western Kru into nine coded languages based on the needs of literacy, several consisting of divergent dialects with strong ethnocentric identities.

- Glio-Oubi
- Krumen (3 languages in Côte d'Ivoire)
- Grebo proper (5 languages)

Any of the twenty-five or more dialects in the group is likely to be called (a variety of) Grebo.

== Multilingualism ==
A degree of bilingualism / bidialectalism is normal in such a context, but so is the commonly observed thrust for autonomy. Factors such as exogamy and the needs of commerce foster intercommunication strategies. Because of the emphasis on the need for communication, the degree of inter-intelligibility of the varieties appears to be less than if they were considered in isolation.

Diglossia (extended or not), often with Liberian (Pidgin) English, provides an additional dimension to the complexity described above.

== Bibliography ==
- Innes, Gordon. 1966. An Introduction to Grebo. London: Luzac.
- Innes, Gordon. 1967. A Grebo-English dictionary. (West African Language Monographs, 6) London: Cambridge University Press.
- Ingemann, Frances, and John Duitsman. "A Survey of Grebo Dialects in Liberia," Liberian Studies Journal, 7(2):121-131, 1976.
- Greenberg, Joseph H., The Languages of Africa. Indiana Univ. Press, 1966).
- Hasselbring, Sue and Eric Johnson. A sociolinguistic survey of the Grebo language area of Liberia. SIL Electronic Survey Reports 2002-074, 2002. Online version: .
- Payne, John. 1867. A Dictionary of the Grebo Language. Philadelphia: King and Baird.
