= APRO =

APRO can stand for:

- ICFTU Asia and Pacific Regional Organisation, former trade union federation
- Aerial Phenomena Research Organization, former UFO research network

== See also ==
- Apro language
