= Dewoin language =

Kru language of Liberia

Dewoin
- Native to: Liberia
- Native speakers: 17,000 (2020)
- Language family: Niger–Congo?: Atlantic–Congo; Kru; Western; Bassa; Dewoin

Language codes
- ISO 639-3: dee
- Glottolog: dewo1238
- ELP: Dewoin

The Dewoin language, also known as De, Dey, or Dei, is a Kru language of the Niger–Congo language family. It is spoken primarily near the coastal areas of Montserrado County in western Liberia, including the capital Monrovia. It has a lexical similarity of 0.72 with the Bassa language and a mutual intelligibility of 64-70% or possibly much higher mutual intelligibility with the Bassa language, but the lower mutual intelligibility is due to major Gola influence and depending on the dialect being compared, as Dei has 8 dialects, but it still does keep core Bassaic grammar.

In 1991, Dewoin was spoken by 8,100 people.

== See also ==
- Languages of Africa
