= Wané language =

Kru language spoken in Ivory Coast

Wané
- Region: Ivory Coast
- Native speakers: (2,100 cited 1993)
- Language family: Niger–Congo?: Atlantic–Congo; Kru; Eastern; Bakwe–Wane; Wané

Language codes
- ISO 639-3: hwa
- Glottolog: wane1242

Wané (Hwané, Ngwané) is a minor Kru language of Ivory Coast. It is not close enough to its nearest relative, Bakwé, to be readily intelligible, though some young Wané speak that language.
