= Glio-Ubi language =

Kru language spoken in West Africa

Glio-Oubi
- Glio (Liberia), Oubi or Ubi (Ivory Coast)
- Native to: Liberia, Ivory Coast
- Native speakers: (10,000 cited 1991–2020)
- Language family: Niger–Congo?: Atlantic–Congo; Kru; Western; Grebo; Glio-Oubi

Language codes
- ISO 639-3: oub
- Glottolog: glio1241

The Glio-Oubi language (Glio-Ubi) is a Kru language of the Niger–Congo language family. It is spoken in northeast Liberia, where it is known as Glio, and in western Ivory Coast, where it is known as Oubi or Ubi. It has a lexical similarity of 0.75 with the Glaro-Twabo language.

In 1991, Glio was spoken by 3,500 people in Liberia and 2,500 Oubi speakers in Ivory Coast.

== See also ==
- Languages of Africa
- Languages of Ivory Coast
