= Neyo language =

Kru language of Ivory Coast

Neyo
- Region: Ivory Coast
- Native speakers: (9,200 cited 1993)
- Language family: Niger–Congo?: Atlantic–Congo; Kru; Eastern; Bété? Dida?; Neyo

Language codes
- ISO 639-3: ney
- Glottolog: neyo1238

Neyo is a Kru language of Ivory Coast, near the mouth of the Sassandra River.

== Alphabet ==
- a - [a]
- b - [b]
- bh - [ɓ]
- c - [c]
- d - [d]
- é - [e]
- e - [ɪ]
- è - [ɛ]
- f - [f]
- g - [g]
- gb - [g͡b]
- i - [i]
- dj - [ɟ]
- k - [k]
- kp - [k͡p]
- l - [l]
- m - [m]
- n - [n]
- ñ - [ɲ]
- ng - [ŋ]
- ô - [o]
- ö - [ʊ]
- o - [ɔ]
- p - [p]
- s - [s]
- t - [t]
- u - [u]
- v - [v]
- w - [w]
- y - [j]
- z - [z]

=== Tones ===
- é - high tone
- e/ē - mid tone
- è - low tone
