= KQO =

KQO or kqo may refer to:

- KQO, the station code for Kot Lalloo railway station, Sindh, Pakistan
- kqo, the ISO 639-3 code for Konobo language, Liberia
