= TJA (disambiguation) =

TJA may refer to:

- The Jet Age, an American indie rock band
- tja, the ISO 639-3 code for Tajuasohn language
- Capitán Oriel Lea Plaza Airport, the IATA code TJA
- Telecommunication Journal of Australia
