= KRW =

KRW may refer to:

- South Korean won (ISO 4217 code), the currency of South Korea
- Türkmenbaşy International Airport (IATA code), Turkmenistan
- Western Krahn language (ISO 639 code), spoken by the Krahn people of Liberia and Ivory Coast
