= Guere language =

Kru language spoken in Ivory Coast

Guéré
- Wè, Wɛɛ
- Native to: Ivory Coast
- Region: Dix-Huit Montagnes, Moyen-Cavally
- Native speakers: 400,000 (2017)
- Language family: Niger–Congo?: Atlantic–Congo; Kru; Western Kru; Wee; Guere–Krahn; Guéré

Language codes
- ISO 639-3: Either: gxx – Central Gere (Southern Wee) wec – Neyo (Western Wee)
- Glottolog: guer1240

Guéré (Gere), also called Wè (Wee), is a Kru language spoken by over 300,000 people in the Dix-Huit Montagnes and Moyen-Cavally regions of Ivory Coast.

== Phonology ==
The phonology of Guere (here the Zagna dialect of Central Guere / Southern Wè) is briefly sketched out below.

=== Consonants ===
The consonant phonemes are as follows:

		Labial	Alveolar	Palatal	Velar	Labial- velar	Labialized velar
Stops	voiceless	p	t	c	k	k͡p	kʷ
Stops	voiced	b	d	ɟ	ɡ	ɡ͡b	ɡʷ
Stops	implosive	ɓ					
Nasal		m	n	ɲ			
Fricative	voiceless	f	s				
Fricative	voiced	v	z				
Approximant			l	j			w

Allophones of some of these phonemes include:

- [k͡m] is an allophone of /k͡p/ before nasal vowels
- [ŋ͡m] is an allophone of /ɡ͡b/ before nasal vowels
- [ŋʷ] is an allophone of /w/ before nasal vowels
- [ɗ] is an allophone of /l/ in word-initial position
- [r] is an allophone of /l/ after a coronal consonant (alveolar or palatal)

In addition, while the nasal consonants /m, n/ and contrast with /ɓ/ and /l/ before oral vowels, and are thus separate phonemes, before nasal vowels only the nasal consonants occur. /ɓ/ and /l/ do not occur before nasal vowels, suggesting that historically a phonemic merger between these sounds and the nasals /m, n/ may have occurred in this position.

=== Vowels ===
Like many West African languages, Guere makes use of a contrast between vowels with advanced tongue root and those with retracted tongue root. In addition, nasal vowels contrast phonemically with oral vowels.

	Oral		Nasal	
	Front	Back	Front	Back
Close (ATR)	i	u	ĩ	ũ
Close (RTR)	ɪ	ʊ	ɪ̃	ʊ̃
Mid (ATR)	e	o		õ
Mid (RTR)	ɛ	ɔ	ɛ̃	ɔ̃
Open (RTR)		a		ã

=== Tones ===
Guere is a tonal language and contrasts ten tones:

Tone	IPA	Example	Gloss
Low	˩	ɡ͡ba˩	"to scatter"
Mid	˧	ɡ͡ba˧	"to destroy"
High	˦	mɛ˦	"to die"
Top	˥	ji˥	"full"
Low–high rising	˩˦	ɡ͡bla˩˦	"hat"
Low–top rising	˩˥	k͡plɔ̃˩˥	"banana"
Mid–high rising	˧˦	ɓlo˧˦	"wall"
High–top rising	˦˥	de˦˥	"younger brother"
High–low falling	˦˩	ɡ͡ba˩a˦˩	"goat"
Mid–low falling	˧˩	sre˧˩	"penis"

== See also ==
- Wobe a.k.a. Northern Wè
