= Neyo (disambiguation) =

Ne-Yo (born 1979) is an American R&B singer-songwriter.

Neyo may also refer to:

== Characters ==
- Commander Neyo, a fictional clone trooper character from Star Wars

== Places ==
- Neyo (Raa Atoll), an uninhabited island in the Raa Atoll, Republic of Maldives
- Neyo (Shaviyani Atoll), an uninhabited island in the Shaviyani Atoll, Republic of Maldives

== Other uses ==
- Neyo language, a Kru language of Ivory Coast, near the mouth of the Sassandra River

== See also ==
- Neo (disambiguation)
