= Mangree language =

Extinct West African Language

Mangree
- Region: West Africa
- Era: attested 1789
- Language family: Niger–Congo?: unclassified; Kru ?; Kwa ?; Mande ?; Mangree

Language codes
- ISO 639-3: None (mis)
- Glottolog: mang1422

Mangree (pronunciation approximately [maŋɡreː]) is a poorly attested, unclassified, and extinct language of the interior of West Africa, possibly from what is now Ivory Coast. It is only attested in a list of a dozen words collected in the late 18th century. There is some indication that it might have been a Kru language, but there is not enough data to classify it.

== Geographic distribution ==
The Mangree were reported to live adjacent to the Kanga, not far from the Mandinga and Amina. A large river formed the border between the Mangree and the Gien. Fodor believes that the location was somewhere around 7° north latitude and that the river was either the Sassandra or the Bandama.

== Classification ==
The Mangree language was said to be little different from Gien, which would suggest it was Kru. However, the known vocabulary is not obviously Kru, at least as it was recited and transcribed. The informants were Kanga (also Kru) who said they spoke the language well.

Fodor suggests that the word for God may be the same as Twi o-nyàŋkṍpɔŋ 'God'. The word for 'father' resembles Ewe ame 'human' (and possibly came from a translation of the phrase 'heavenly Father', in which case tata might be 'father' and amee 'sky'), while the word for 'human' resembles Gien me 'human'. The word for 'head' resembles both Twi (with an i vowel) and several Kru languages (with a u vowel). Fodor suggests that the word for 'foot' may be a compound, 'head of the leg'.

The word for 'child' resembles Portuguese pequenino (and English piccaninny), which is widespread in West Africa pidgins and creoles. Fodor was not able to find parallels for the other words in Kru or Kwa languages.

The vocabulary that resembles Twi may be loanwords.

== Word list ==
Fodor reports the following 11 words:

god: yankombum ('jankombum')
sky: tata
sun: lataa
human: mia
foot: trippi
head: tri
man: laniu
woman: auvee ('auwee')
child: pikkeninne
father: amee
mother: pakkabel

A brief summary of the source repeats 'head', 'man', 'woman' and adds ichi ('itchi') 'water'.
