= Tiagba language =

Kru language of Ivory Coast

Tiagba
- Lélé
- Ahizi
- Native to: Ivory Coast
- Ethnicity: Aizi (Prokpo)
- Native speakers: (9,000 cited 1999)
- Language family: Niger–Congo?: Atlantic–Congo; Kru; Tiagba

Language codes
- ISO 639-3: ahi
- Glottolog: tiag1235

The Lélé language, Lélémrin, also known as Tiagba (Tiagbamrin) after its principal town, is a Kru language spoken by ethnic Aizi (Ahizi) on the shores of Ébrié Lagoon in Ivory Coast. It is not intelligible with Mobu, also spoken by Aizi at the lagoon.

The Lele endonym for all Aizi is Prokpo for the people (or in Tiagba Krokpo), Prokpamrin for the language.

== Phonology ==
=== Consonants ===
The consonant phonemes are located in the chart below.

		Bilabial		Labiodental		Alveolar		Post- alveolar		Palatal		Labial–velar		Velar	
Nasal			m				n			ɲ					ŋ
Plosive		p	b			t	d			c	ɟ	k͡p	ɡ͡b	k	g
Implosive			ɓ												
Fricative				f	v	s	z	ʃ	ʒ						
Approximant	Median										j	w			
Approximant	Lateral						l								

=== Vowels ===
	Front	Near-front	Near-back	Back
Close	i			
Near-close		ɪ	ʊ	
Close-mid	e			o
Open-mid	ɛ			ɔ
Open	a			
