= Kuya language =

Kru language of Ivory Coast

Kuya
- Region: Ivory Coast
- Native speakers: (10,100 cited 1993)
- Language family: Niger–Congo?: Atlantic–Congo; Kru; Eastern; Bété; Kuya
- Writing system: Latin alphabet Bété syllabary

Language codes
- ISO 639-3: kyf
- Glottolog: kouy1238

Kuya (Kouya, Kowya) is a Kru language of Ivory Coast. The language was first put in written form in the 1980s.
