= Apro language =

Language spoken in Ivory Coast

Apro
- Aproumu
- Native to: Ivory Coast
- Ethnicity: Aizi (Aproin)
- Native speakers: (6,500 cited 1999)
- Language family: Niger–Congo?: Atlantic–Congo; Volta–Congo; unclassified; Apro

Language codes
- ISO 639-3: ahp
- Glottolog: apro1235

Apro, also known as Aproumu, is a language spoken by the Aizi people of Ébrié Lagoon in Ivory Coast. Once assumed to be a Kru language like the other two Aizi languages, subsequent investigation concluded it was Kwa and then that it was unclassified within Volta–Congo

== Phonology ==
=== Consonants ===
The consonants of the Aproumu language are located in the chart below.

		Bilabial		Labiodental		Alveolar		Post- alveolar		Palatal		Labial–velar		Velar	
Nasal			m				n			ɲ					ŋ
Plosive		p	b			t	d			c	ɟ	k͡p	ɡ͡b	k	g
Implosive			ɓ												
Fricative				f	v	s	z	ʃ	ʒ						
Approximant	Median										j	w			
Approximant	Lateral						l								

=== Vowels ===
	Front	Near-front	Back
Close	i		u, ɯ̞
Near-close		ɪ	
Close-mid	e		o
Open-mid	ɛ		ʌ
Open	a		
