= Siamou language =

Language isolate of southwest Burkina Faso

Siamou
- Sɛmɛ
- Native to: Burkina Faso, Ivory Coast, Mali
- Ethnicity: Seme
- Native speakers: (40,000 cited ca. 1999)
- Language family: Language isolate

Language codes
- ISO 639-3: sif
- Glottolog: siam1242

Siamou, also known as Seme (Sɛmɛ), is a language spoken mainly in Burkina Faso, but also in Ivory Coast and Mali. It is often classified as one of the Kru languages or unclassified within the proposed Niger–Congo languages, although it could likely be a language isolate.

The speakers call themselves Seme. The Dioula language exonym is Siamou.

== Classification ==
Siamou is traditionally classed as Kru. However, according to Roger Blench (2013) and Pierre Vogler (2015), the language bears little resemblance to Kru. Güldemann (2018) also leaves out Siamou as unrelated to Niger-Congo and considers it a language isolate. Glottolog also considers it a language isolate on that basis.

== Geographical distribution ==
In 1999, it was spoken by 20,000 people in western Burkina Faso and another 20,000 in the Ivory Coast and Mali. In Burkina Faso, it is mainly spoken in the province of Kénédougou, around the provincial capital Orodara and the surrounding villages of Bandougou, Didéri, Diéri, Diéridéni, Diossogou, Kotoudéni, Lidara, and Tin. Siamou has one major dialect, Bandougou. In addition, there are minor dialectal differences among the Siamou spoken in Orodara and in surrounding villages. It is also spoken in Toussiana Department of Burkina Faso.

== Phonology ==
=== Consonants ===
		Labial	Alveolar	Palatal	Velar	Labio- velar	Glottal
Plosive	voiceless	(p)	t		k	k͡p	
Plosive	voiced	b	d	ɡʲ	(ɡ)	ɡ͡b	
Fricative		f	s	ʃ			(h)
Nasal		m	n	ɲ		ŋ͡m	
Trill			r				
Lateral			l				
Approximant				j		w	

- Consonants /p, ɡ, h/ are rare and can only occur in the onset of a sylable.
- /ʃ/ is claimed to be an allophone of /s/ in complementary distribution by Traoré (1984), with [ʃ] before high vowels and [s] elsewhere, but there are some near-minimal pairs between the two, such as shaŋn /ʃãᵑ/ 'measure' and saŋ /sã/ 'pound'.

=== Vowels ===
	Oral		Nasal	
	Front	Back	Front	Back
High	i	u	ĩ	
High-mid	e	o		
Low-mid	ɛ	ɔ	ɛ̃	ɔ̃
Low	a		ã	

- Vowels /i, u/ are realized as -ATR [ɪ, ʊ] when in closed syllables.
- Vowels in unstressed syllables can occur as [ə], according to Traoré (1984).

=== Phonotactics ===
All consonants can occur in the onset position, and all consonants except /r/ are found word-initially except in loanwords (e.g. radio 'radio').

== Grammar ==
Siamou word order is SOV, like the Senufo languages, but unlike the SVO Central Gur languages.

== See also ==
- Languages of Africa
