= Mobu language =

Kru language spoken in Ivory Coast

Mobu
- Ahizi
- Mobumrin
- Native to: Ivory Coast
- Ethnicity: Aizi (Mobuin)
- Native speakers: (2,000 cited 1999)
- Language family: Niger–Congo?: Atlantic–Congo; Kru; Aizi; Mobu

Language codes
- ISO 639-3: ahm
- Glottolog: mobu1235

The Mobu language, Mobumrin, is a Kru language spoken by ethnic Aizi (Ahizi) on the shores of Ébrié Lagoon in Ivory Coast. It is not intelligible with Lele (Tiagba), also spoken by Aizi at the lagoon.

The endonym is Mobuin, and the name for all Aizi is Frukpu.
