= Nyabwa language =

Kru language spoken in Ivory Coast

Nyabwa
- Native to: Ivory Coast
- Native speakers: 72,000 (2017)
- Language family: Niger–Congo?: Atlantic–Congo; Kru; Western Kru; Wee; Nyabwa

Language codes
- ISO 639-3: nwb
- Glottolog: nyab1255

The Nyabwa (Niaboua, Niédéboua, Nyaboa, Nyabwa-Nyédébwa, Nyedebwa or Nyaboa) language is a Kru language spoken in Ivory Coast. It is part of the Wee dialect continuum.

== Writing system ==
Nyabwa alphabet
a	b	bh	c	d	e	ɛ	f	g	gb	gw	i	ɩ	j	k	kp	kw
l	m	n	ng	ny	o	ɔ	p	r	s	t	u	ʋ	v	w	y	z

Nasalisation is indicated by a tilde on the vowel. Tones are indicated by following signs: Very high tone is indicated by a double apostrophe ‹ ˮ › ; High tone is indicated by an apostrophe ‹ ʼ › ; Mid-tone is indicated by no diacritic; Low tone is indicated by a hyphen ‹ ˗ ›.
