= Daho-Doo language =

Guere dialects of Ivory Coast

Daho-Doo
- Native to: Ivory Coast
- Ethnicity: Guere people
- Native speakers: (4,000 cited 1996)
- Language family: Niger–Congo?: Atlantic–Congo; Kru; Western Kru; Wee; Guere–Krahn; Daho-Doo

Language codes
- ISO 639-3: das
- Glottolog: daho1238
- ELP: Daho-Doo

Daho and Doo are two mutually intelligible Guere dialects which are divergent from other varieties spoken by the Guere people.
