= Aizi languages =

Aïzi
- Ahizi
- Geographic distribution: Ivory Coast
- Linguistic classification: Niger–Congo?: Kru; Aïzi
- Subdivisions: Lélé (Tiagba); Mobu

Language codes
- ISO 639-3: –
- Glottolog: aizi1248

The Aizi (Aïzi, Ahizi, Ezibo) speak three languages around Ébrié Lagoon in Ivory Coast.

Two of the languages are Kru. They are divergent enough for intelligibility to be difficult:

- Lélé (Lélémrin), also known as Tiagba (Tiagbamrin) after its principal town
- Mobu (Mobumrin)

It was long assumed that the third ethnically Aizi language, Apro ("Aproumu"), was Kru as well. However, now that it has been documented, Apro is classified as a Kwa language.
