= Godié language =

Kru language spoken in Ivory Coast

Godié
- Region: Ivory Coast
- Native speakers: (26,000 cited 1993)
- Language family: Niger–Congo?: Atlantic–Congo; Kru; Eastern; Bété; Godié
- Writing system: Latin alphabet Bété syllabary

Language codes
- ISO 639-3: god
- Glottolog: godi1239

The Godié language is a Kru language spoken by the Godié people in the southwest and central-west of Ivory Coast. It is one of the varieties of the Bété group. In 1993, the language had 26,400 native speakers.

== Writing ==
Godié spelling is based on the rules of the Orthographe pratique des langues ivoiriennes (Orthographic Conventions for Ivorian Languages) created by the Institut de linguistique appliquée (ILA) of the Université Félix Houphouët-Boigny. This convention has had revisions.

Godié letters
a	ä	b	c	d	e	ë	f	g	gh	gw	i	ï	ɩ	j	k	kw	l
m	n	ny	nw	ŋ	o	ö	ɔ	p	s	t	u	ü	ʋ	w	y	z	

The tone is indicated with an apostrophe for the high tone and the minus sign for the low tone before the syllable.

== Linguistic literature ==
- Marchese, Lynell. "On the role of conditionals in Godie procedural discourse." Coherence and Grounding in Discourse (1987): 263-280.
- Marchese, Lynell. "Subordinate clauses as topics in Godie." Studies in African Linguistics, Supplement 7 (1977): 157-164.
- Marchese, Lynell. "Tense innovation in the Kru language family." Studies in African linguistics 15, no. 2 (1984): 189ff.
