= Glaro-Twabo language =

Kru languages of Liberia

Glaro-Twabo
- Native to: Liberia
- Native speakers: 8,200 (2020)
- Language family: Niger–Congo?: Atlantic–Congo; Kru; Western Kru; Wee; Guere–Krahn; Glaro-Twabo

Language codes
- ISO 639-3: glr
- Glottolog: glar1241

Glaro and Twabo are two largely mutually intelligible dialects of the Wèè languages which are divergent other. Ethnologue reports that Twabo (but not Glaro) has slight intelligibility with some dialects of Eastern Krahn.
