= Kwadia language =

Kru language of Ivory Coast

Kwadia
- Kodia
- Region: Ivory Coast
- Native speakers: (840 cited 1993)
- Language family: Niger–Congo?: Atlantic–Congo; Kru; Eastern; Kwadia

Language codes
- ISO 639-3: kwp
- Glottolog: kodi1246

Kwadia (Kodia) is a minor Kru language of Ivory Coast.
