= Kuwaa language =

Kru language of Liberia

Kuwaa
- Native to: Liberia
- Native speakers: 27,000 (2020)
- Language family: Niger–Congo?: Kru; Kuwaa

Language codes
- ISO 639-3: blh
- Glottolog: kuwa1247

The Kuwaa language, also known as Belle, Belleh, Kowaao, and Kwaa, is a Kru language. It is spoken in northwestern Liberia, primarily in Lofa County. The speech of the Lubaisu and Gbade, the two Kuwaa clans, is differentiated only by minor variations in pronunciation.
