= Tajuasohn language =

Kru language of Liberia

Tajuasohn
- Native to: Liberia
- Native speakers: 20,000 (2020)
- Language family: Niger–Congo?: Atlantic–Congo; Kru; Western Kru; Klao; Tajuasohn

Language codes
- ISO 639-3: tja
- Glottolog: taju1238

The Tajuasohn language, also known as Tajuason, Tajuoso, and Tajuosohn, is a Kru language of the Niger–Congo language family. It is spoken primarily in Sinoe County in eastern Liberia by members of five local clans.

In 1991, Tajuasohn was spoken by 9,600 people.

== See also ==
- Languages of Africa
