= Krumen people =

Ethnic group of coastal Liberia and Ivory Coast

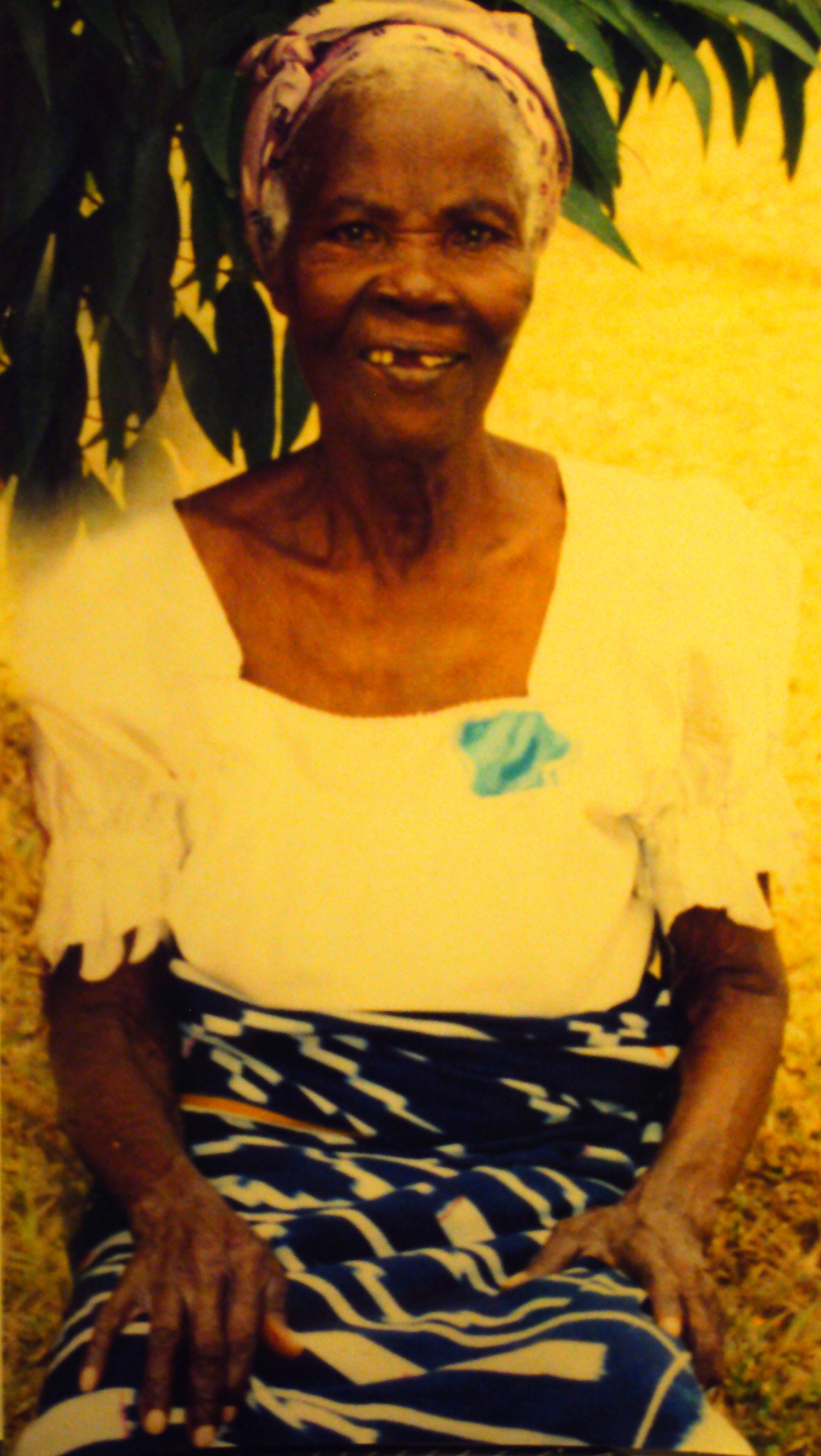
Krumen woman from the area of Bloléquin, Ivory Coast

The term Krumen (also Kroumen, Kroomen) refers to historical sailors from the Kru people group living mostly along the coast of Liberia and Ivory Coast. One theory, advanced in the 1911 Encyclopædia Britannica, was that the term Kru or Krumen derived from Klao, which is the name of the Kru in their language. Their numbers were estimated to be 48,300 in 1993, of whom 28,300 were in Ivory Coast. They are a subgroup of the Grebo and speak the Krumen language.

== Etymology ==
There has been much scholarly debate on the historical origin of the term Krumen, since there is little evidence of use of the term outside of the maritime environment in which the Kru men served as sailors, and the fact that many Grebo and other West Africans worked in this capacity. Hence the mistaken belief that its root was from "crewmen" in English (a pidgin form of which was a lingua franca among them, thanks to their service on European vessels).

Although the earliest Kru mariners may have come from the five core towns, people from many other places and ethnicities joined the original Kru, creating a mixed but strongly held identity, not only in their home district, but in the many trading posts and towns where they came to settle, and then people from those places also became effectively Krumen by taking on their identity and behavioral characteristics. Some scholars maintain that in fact the term Krumen and indeed even Kru originated in the maritime branch of the culture alone, being transported back to the homelands from the dispersed communities, but others contend that the process of identity formation was more complex involving both maritime and shore communities.

== The Kru languages ==
Wilhelm Bleek classified the Kru language with the Mandingo family, and in this he was followed by R. G. Latham; S. W. Koelle, who published a Kru grammar (1854), disagreed. Now Kru is considered a primary branch of the Niger-Congo family.
