= Western Krahn language =

Language

Krahn
- Native to: Liberia, Ivory Coast
- Ethnicity: Krahn
- Native speakers: (98,000 cited 1993–2015)
- Language family: Niger–Congo?: Atlantic–Congo; Kru; Western Kru; Wee; Guere–Krahn; Krahn

Language codes
- ISO 639-3: krw
- Glottolog: west2488

Western Krahn is the principal language spoken by the Krahn people of Liberia and Ivory Coast. It is part of a series a dialects of the Wee (Guere) dialect continuum spoken by the Krahn and Guere peoples. It scored a 0.78-0.85 cognate percentage with Central Bassa.

== See also ==
- Konobo language (Eastern Krahn)
- Sapo language (Southern Krahn)
