= Bakwé language =

Kru language of Ivory Coast

Bakwé
- Region: Ivory Coast
- Native speakers: (10,300 cited 1993)
- Language family: Niger–Congo?: Atlantic–Congo; Kru; Eastern; Bakwe–Wane; Bakwé

Language codes
- ISO 639-3: bjw
- Glottolog: bakw1243

Bakwé is a Kru language of Ivory Coast.
