= Klao language =

Kru language spoken in Liberia

Klao
- Kru
- Native to: Liberia, Sierra Leone, Ghana, Guinea
- Ethnicity: Kru people
- Native speakers: 400,000 (2020)
- Language family: Niger–Congo?: Atlantic–Congo; Kru; Western Kru; Klao–Tajuasohn; Klao

Language codes
- ISO 639-3: klu
- Glottolog: klao1243

A Klao speaker in Liberia.

Klao (also Klaoh), or Kru, is a Kru language of the Niger–Congo language family, spoken primarily in Liberia, with some speakers also in Sierra Leone, Ghana and Guinea. It uses SVO word order for main clauses and SOV for embedded clauses. A Klao translation of the Bible by missionary Nancy Lightfoot was released in 2000. The language has Western, West Central, Central, and Eastern dialects.

== Phonology ==
=== Consonants ===
Klao consonants
		Labial	Alveolar	Palatal	Velar		Labio- velar
		Labial	Alveolar	Palatal	plain	lab.	Labio- velar
Plosive	voiceless	p	t	c	k	kʷ	k͡p
Plosive	voiced	b	d	ɟ			ɡ͡b
Fricative		f	s				
Nasal		m	n	ɲ	ŋ		ŋ͡m
Lateral			l				
Approximant		w		j			

- /l/ may also be heard as flap sounds [ɺ] or [ɾ].

=== Vowels ===
Klao vowels
	Front	Central		Back
Close	i ĩ			u ũ
Close-mid	e	ə ə̃	ɵ ɵ̃	o
Open-mid	ɛ ɛ̃			ɔ ɔ̃
Open		a ã		

- Sounds /ə, ə̃, ɵ, ɵ̃/ may also be heard as [ɪ, ɪ̃, ʊ, ʊ̃] among dialects.
