= Wobé language =

Kru language spoken in Ivory Coast

Wobé
- Northern Wèè
- Native to: Ivory Coast
- Ethnicity: Krahn people
- Native speakers: (160,000 cited 1993)
- Language family: Niger–Congo?: Atlantic–Congo; Kru; Western Kru; Wee; Wobé

Language codes
- ISO 639-3: wob
- Glottolog: weno1238

Wobé (Ouobe) is an indigenous Kru language spoken in Ivory Coast. It is one of several languages in a dialect continuum called Wèè (Wɛɛ).

== Phonology ==
Typical of Western Kru languages, Wobé has sixteen vowel phonemes, with nine oral vowels and seven nasal vowels, and seventeen consonant phonemes. Wobé words tend not to have diphthongs, but rather the (up to) three vowels in a native non-compound word are pronounced separately.

Consonant phonemes
		Labial	Alveolar	Palatal	Velar	Labial-velar
Plosives	Voiceless	/p/	/t/	/c/	/k/	/k͡p/
Plosives	Voiced	/b/	/d/	/ɟ/	/g/	/ɡ͡b/
Fricatives		/f/	/s/			
Nasals		/m/	/n/	/ɲ/		
Approximants			/l/			/w/

Vowel phonemes
	Oral		Nasal	
	Front	Back	Front	Back
Close	/i/	/u/	/ĩ/	/ũ/
Near-close	/ɪ/	/ʊ/	/ɪ̃/	/ʊ̃/
Mid-close	/e/	/o/		
Mid-open	/ɛ/	/ɔ/	/ɛ̃/	/ɔ̃/
Open	/a/		/ã/	

=== Tone ===
Wobé is known for claims that it has the largest number of tones (fourteen) of any language in the world. However, other researchers have not confirmed this, and many of them believe that some of these will turn out to be sequences of tones or prosodic effects, though the Wèè languages in general do have extraordinarily large tone systems.

The fourteen posited tones are:

IPA	˥	˦	˧	˨	˧˥	˧˦	˨˥	˨˦	˨˧	˥˩	˦˩	˧˩	˨˩	˨˧˩
B&L tone numbers	1	2	3	4	31	32	41	42	43	15	25	35	45	435
Newman adjustment	0	1	2	3	20	21	30	31	32	04	14	24	34	324

== Numerals ==
Wobe has a quinary, decimal system, and it is one of the only two Kru languages which have adopted the decimal system.
