= Bassa language =

Kru language spoken in Liberia

Bassa
- 𖫔𖫧𖫳𖫒𖫨𖫰𖫨𖫱 (Ɓǎsɔ́ɔ̀)
- Native to: Liberia, Ivory Coast, Sierra Leone
- Native speakers: 410,000 (2006)
- Language family: Niger–Congo?: Atlantic–Congo; Kru; Western; Bassa; Bassa
- Writing system: Bassa Vah alphabet (Vah)

Language codes
- ISO 639-3: bsq
- Glottolog: nucl1418

The Bassa language, Bassa-Kor, Bassa and Kor, or Ɓǎsɔ́ɔ̀ is a Kru language dialect continuum spoken by about 783,000–865,000 Bassa people in Liberia, 2,000–14,000 in Ivory Coast, and 7,300–11,000 in Sierra Leone. It is also the biggest Liberian language in the United States (when excluding Mandinka) with an at-home speaking population of 3,689–12,516 and a total fluent speaker population of 22,000–56,000 respectively, which encompasses all those who understand the language but do not use it. Its American-Speaker population is followed by Southern Kisi at 1,746–5,310 at home speakers and 11,000–25,000, Dan(Gio) at 1,633–5,193 at-home speakers and 10,800–23,000 total fluent speakers, and Western Krahn at 1,506–4,699 at-home speakers and 10,000–23,000 speakers in the United States.

== Dialects and Relatives ==
The Bassa language has 15–18 dialects shared across 15–18 subgroups. The Bassa dialect continuum is divided into 4 dialect clusters. Western with 2-3 dialects(Mambahn and Gibi, sometimes including the "Monrovia accent" dialect, 94–96% cognate percentage with the Central dialects), Central with 8 dialects (Kokoyah, Mehnwein, Hwengbarkon, Kor, Central (debated with Kor) Gbor, Neekreen, Gbehzohn, and Gba Sor, 95–98% cognate percentage with each other), Rivercess with 1 dialect (Nibuehnxwiniin, 88–93% cognate percentage with the Central dialects, due to mass borrowing from Western Krahn and Klao), and Eastern Bassa with 5 dialects( Kplor, Dorbor, Gbii, Doru(or Dowlu) and Beleto 82–92% cognate percentage with the Central dialects), but the Eastern dialects are sometimes considered separate languages despite many across most Bassa dialects describe them as a "primitive" kind of Bassa. The Rivercess cluster faintly but clearly still uses a 9 vowel system and Eastern Bassa clusters fully use it. The Rivercess Bassa dialect is one of the only dialects in Africa and possibly the world to diverge its mainstream language's numbering system. The number 15 in Central and Western Bassa dialects is "ɓaɖa-bùè sè hm̀m̌ (10 + 5)" but in Rivercess Bassa, it is "ɓaɖa-bùè hwɔ-bùì". Then when going to the next number, 16, Central and Western Bassa dialects call the number "ɓaɖa-bùè sè mɛ̀nɛ̌ìn-ɖò (10 + 6). But in Rivercess Bassa, it is said as "ɓaɖa-bùè hwɔ-bùì se ɖò (15 + 1).

The Entire Bassa dialect continuum closest relatives are the Western Krahn and the greater Wè (Wɛɛ) complex, to the point where during the 1900s to now, the Bassa-Gbii cluster and Dei were strongly hypothesized to be a western extension of the Wè complex, especially close to Krahn and Sapo, further emphasized by some Sapo elders themselves that they understood Bassa much more than any Klao or Grebo dialect. One myth is that Bassa is closer to Klao which is untrue when you look at the words side by side and use a 207 word list. Another misconception is that Klao is closer to Krahn than Bassa is to Krahn. This is also untrue as the relationship between the Bassa language and the Western Krahn language(especially the Gbarzon and Kpeaply dialects) is exceptionally high with an 84% cognate score,with reported mutual intelligibilty by a community between 40s and 70s(a facebook post in Gbarzon Krahn caught the attention of many Bassa speakers claiming near to complete comprehension) while Bassa-Klao (Jlao dialect) is only 69%, with mutual intelligibility by the same Central Bassa community much lower at 10s to 40s, and Klao-Western Krahn is 71% recorded cognation. The mutual intelligibility between Bassa-Grebo(E Je dialect) goes down further at 54% Other We languages that show a higher cognate score than Klao are Northern Wè(Kioubly dialect) (74%), Eastern Krahn (Tchien dialect) (80-83% depending on the modified list) Nyabwa (Nyadebwa dialect,72%), Southern Wè (Central dialect, 75%) and Western We (Kaowlu dialect) (77%). Even a dialect of Southern Guere, Néao, scored a 79. A famous phrase is that Bassa has the accent of a Klao speaker but the vocabulary of a Krahn speaker, but the public also regularly equates the Bassa and Krahn accents as extremely similar, those nonfluent frequently confusing the two.

The relationship between Bassa and Western Krahn(particularly the Gbarzon dialect) is shown in their shared use of Circumpositional Verb use. Examples: to get angry: "kpá dyoɖoún" vs "gbǎ jlu̍h-u" lit. 'fall into anger'(specific dialects of Klao also say "kpa̍ jloh",to run: "kpá peɖeɛ" vs "gba̍ ple̍-ɛ",to be fine: "nɔ̀mɔ̀ dyíin" vs "nmɔ jii̍", and to ask: "diè dyi" vs "tèle i̍" z) The languages also do carry some common consonant switches, which include: Z ➔ S(to pass[zi➔si̍]), KP➔GB/P(to carry[kpa➔gba̍]), HW➔W(heart[hwòɖǒ➔wlùh]), D➔T(to begin[dè gbɔ➔tè gbɔ̀]), M➔P(to want[mɔ́➔pɔ̀n]), NY➔N(to do[nyu-nu̍]),C➔T(tree[cu➔tu̍]) etc.(these changes are not mandatory and both languages will have the same consonant at times),abstract noun formations(bad thing/rotten thing:ɖɛ gbà/ɖɛ zɔ̃̌➔dɛ̍ sɔ̀n), the same vowel elison of the negative marker(se/ké) and 'it'(ɔ when animate/ɛ when inanimate;contraction of ɖɛ). Examples are, (I don't know: [Southern Wè: 'Ɩn seɔ yibo], [Bassa: Ḿ(I) seɔ(ng.+it) dyuò(to know)], and [Western Krahn: Ǐn se̍-o juo]). the same Mixed-Syntax Language order when faced with an auxiliary marker(..so that he may be good again: ...ɔ(he) ké[should] dyíin nɔ̀mɔ̀[be good] ɖe[again]➔ ɔ̍ iě jii̍ nmɔ dode̍), and they both use the same verbal bracketing system (he asked something:ɔ diè ɖɛ ɖò dyi➔ ɔ̍ tèle dɛ̍ i̍). Same things goes for the majority of Wè languages. A demonstration of how Bassa might grammatically be a Wè language are:

Classification	Branch	Sub-Branch	Language Complex	Language	Dialect Cluster	Dialect	to ask	to be fine	to be righteous	to run	to seek / look for	to speak to	to leave / abandon
Kru	Western Kru	Wè	Bassa-Krahn-Guèrè	Bassa	Central Bassa	Central Bassa	diè dyi	nɔ̀mɔ̀ dyíin	sɛ́ɖɛ́ìn dyí	kpa peɖeɛ	mɔ́ dyi	wùɖù gbo	táà dyi
Kru	Western Kru	Wè	Bassa-Krahn-Guèrè	Krahn	Western Krahn	Gbarzon	tèle i̍	nmɔ i̍ / nmɔ jii̍	slɛ̌ i̍	gba̍ ple̍-ɛ	pɔ̀n i̍	wlu we̍	tǎli i̍
Kru	Western Kru	Wè	Bassa-Krahn-Guèrè	Krahn	Eastern Krahn	Tchien	dhele dih	nmor 'yi	'sleh 'i	kpa ple-a'	'bhorn dih	wlu bo	'tali dih
Kru	Western Kru	Wèè	Bassa-Krahn-Guèrè	Wè	Guèrè	Central Guèrè	dee dhi	nmɔ "jhrii	'srɛɛ"	kpa plea'	'bɔn dhi	ghwlu -bee	tɩtɛ ti / tu dhi
Kru	Western Kru	Wèè	Bassa-Krahn-Guèrè	Wè	Wobé	Kouibly	tee i	nmɔ "jri i	srɛi"	kpa plea'	pɔn i	wlu -pee	tai' i
Kru	Western Kru	Wèè	Bassa-Krahn-Guèrè	Wè	Western Wè	Kaowlu	tee' i	-	srɛɛ'	kpa plea'	pɔn i	wlu -pee	tai' i
Kru	Western Kru	Wèè	Nyabwaic	Nyabwa	Northern Nyabwa	Nyedebwa	dede ti	-nmɔ "yi	'srɛ	kpa plea'	pɔn i	wlu -bodɩ	tali 'mʋ
Kru	Western Kru	Klaoic	Klao	Klao (Kru)	Central Klao	Jlao	jla ti	sìɛ̍	sekleleh	kpa kitìɛ̀	pɔ̂n ti	plɛle	sìsie
Kru	Western Kru	Greboic	Grebo	Northern Grebo	E Je	Gbeapo	gbàla wan	nmɔ mǒ	slɛɛ̌ mǒ	kpa plùplɛ	pɛ̀n le	dɛ̌ je	sɔna slè

The Rivercess Bassa division is widely known for its relationship with Western Krahn and its intelligibility with Western Krahn(Gbarzon rises to 79-85% due to major similarities in basic words and grammar similarities where Central and Western Bassa speakers struggle). Its similarities also rises with neighboring Bassa-like Klao dialects such as rising to a cognate percentage of 0.75 with Tajuasohn, and even higher with neighboring to geographically distant Klao dialects like Troø, Nymala, and Tatuɛ, all scoring a 0.77 cognate percentage with Rivercess Bassa. This shows the similarity and intelligibility between Kru languages revolves heavily around the specific dialect you are using to compare.

Below is a comparative word list of some of the known dialects:

Classification	Language	head	to love	city	at all	
Western, Bassa	Mambahn(Mabã̀a-wùɖù)	dú	ɖɛ̀ɓɛ̀ mú	hwɔɖɔ	fɔɔ	
Central, Bassa	Kor(Kɔɔ-wùɖù)	dú	ɖɛ̀ɓɛ̀ mú	hwɔɖɔ	fɔɔ ;kíí ɖò	
Central, Bassa	Gbor(Gbɔ̌ɔ̀-wùɖù)	dú	ɖɔ̀ɓɔ̀ mú	hwɔɖɔ	fɔɔ	
Rivercess, Bassa	Nibuehnkreen(Ní-bũ̌ɛ̀-xwíníín-wùɖù)	dúɖú	ɖɛ̀ɓɛ̀ mú	gwɔɖɔ	fuu	
Eastern, Bassa	Gbii(Gbii-wùɖù)	ɖúɖú	dyɛ̀ɓɛ̀ mú	wɔɖɔ	fuu	—
Western, Krahn	Gbarzon	ɖlǔ	dyɛ̀ɓɛ̀ mú	wlɔ	fuu	—

A recovered Wè family tree based on a collection of older Bassa-Wè family relation estimates.

- Wè language complex
  - Wèèic
    - Bassa-Krahn-Guéré
      - Krahn-Guéré
        - Sapo
          - Sikon(Seekon)
          - Putu
          - Kabade
          - Juarzon
          - Waya
          - Nomopo
        - Western Krahn
          - Gbarzon(Gbaeson)
          - Biai
          - Gborbo
          - Gbarbo
          - Gbo
          - Kpeaply
          - Plo
          - Pewa
        - Wè proper
          - Northern Wè
            - Péomé
            - Sémien
            - Tao
            - Kioubly
          - Southern Wè
            - Beu
            - Fleu
            - Gboo
            - Neao
            - Nyeo
            - Zaa
            - Zagna-Zagne
              - Zagna
              - Zagne
            - Zibiao
            - Central
          - Western Wè(Kaowlu)
            - Kaoru
            - Nidrou
      - Bassaic
        - Bassa-Gbii
          - Bassa
            - Central Bassa
              - Kor
              - Gba Sor
              - Central(Gban)
              - Hwengbarkon
              - Gmehnwein
              - Nasehn?
              - Gbor
              - Kokodya
              - Neekreen
              - Central?
              - Gbehzohn(Buchanan Bassa)
            - Rivercess Bassa
              - Nibuehnkreen
                - Nibuehnkreen
                - Dobowein?
            - Western Bassa
              - Mambahn
                - Dugborwlu
              - Gibi-Kwia
                - Gibi
                - Kwia/Queah
                  - Ni Queah
                  - Du Queah
              - Tubees (?) ← historical western Bassa lect, 1871
          - Gbii-Doru
            - Gbii
              - Dorbor
              - Kplor
            - Doru-Beleto
              - Doru
              - Beleto(status unknown)
        - Dewoin
          - Gbulu
          - Gban-Gbaahn
            - Gban
            - Gbaahn
          - Zor
          - Vohn
          - Gbo
          - Dei
    - Konobo
      - Eastern Krahn
        - Tchien
        - Konobo
        - Gorbo
        - Kanneh
      - Daho-Doo
        - Daho
        - Doo
    - Nyabwa
      - Nyabwa proper
      - Nyadebwa

== Phonology ==
=== Consonants ===
		Labial	Alveolar	Palatal (-alveolar)	Velar	Labial- velar	Glottal
Nasal		m	n	ɲ			
Plosive/ Affricate	voiceless	p	t	t͡ʃ	k	k͡p	
Plosive/ Affricate	voiced	b	d	d͡ʒ	ɡ	ɡ͡b	
Implosive		ɓ	ɗ	ʄ			
Fricative	voiceless	f	s			xʷ	h
Fricative	voiced	v	z			ɣʷ	
Approximant						w	

- /ʄ/ can be heard as an approximant [j] intervocalically within compound words.
- /ɡ͡b/ when followed by a nasal can be heard as [ŋ͡m].
- /h/ only rarely occurs.

=== Vowels ===
	Front		Central		Back	
	oral	nasal	oral	nasal	oral	nasal
Close	i	ĩ			u	ũ
Close-mid	e				o	
Open-mid	ɛ	ɛ̃			ɔ	ɔ̃
Open			a	ã		

== Bassa alphabets ==
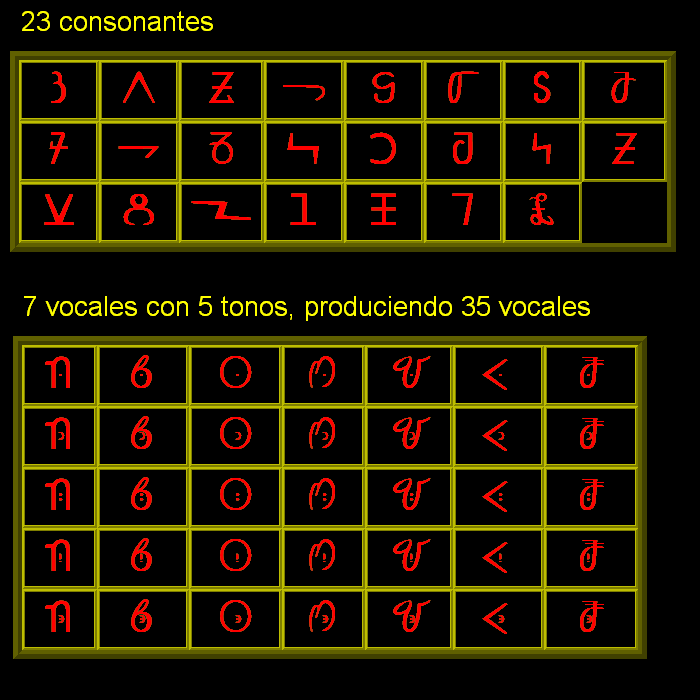
The Bassa Vah alphabet.

It has an indigenous alphabet, Vah, first popularized by Thomas Flo Lewis, who has instigated publishing of limited materials in the language from the mid-1900s through the 1930s, with its height in the 1910s and 1920s. It has been reported that the alphabet was influenced by the Cherokee syllabary created by Sequoyah.

The Vah alphabet has been described as one which, "like the system long in use among the Vai, consists of a series of phonetic characters standing for syllables." In fact, however, Vah is alphabetic. It includes 30 consonants, seven vowels, and five tones that are indicated by dots and lines inside each vowel.

In the 1970s the United Bible Societies (UBS) published a translation of the New Testament. June Hobley, of Liberia Inland Mission, was primarily responsible for the translation. The International Phonetic Alphabet (IPA) was used for this translation rather than the Vah alphabet, mostly for practical reasons related to printing. Because the Bassa people had a tradition of writing, they quickly adapted to the new alphabet, and thousands learned to read.

In 2005, UBS published the entire Bible in Bassa. The translation was sponsored by the Christian Education Foundation of Liberia, Christian Reformed World Missions, and UBS. Don Slager headed a team of translators that included Seokin Payne, Robert Glaybo, and William Boen.

The IPA has largely replaced the Vah alphabet in publications. However, Vah is still highly respected and is still in use by some older men, primarily for record keeping.
