= Dida language =

Kru dialect cluster of Ivory Coast

Dida
- Native to: Ivory Coast
- Region: Southern Ivory Coast
- Native speakers: (200,000 cited 1993)
- Language family: Niger–Congo?: disputed; Kru; Eastern; Dida
- Dialects: Yocoboué Dida; Lakota Dida; Gaɓogbo

Language codes
- ISO 639-3: Variously: gud – Yocoboué Dida dic – Lakota Dida gie – Gaɓogbo
- Glottolog: dida1245 yoco1235 Yocoboué Dida lako1244 Lakota Dida gabo1234 Gaɓogbo

Dida is a dialect cluster of the Kru languages spoken in Ivory Coast.

ISO 639-3 assigns separate codes to three Dida varieties: Yocoboué Dida, also called Yokubwe Dida; Lakota Dida; and Gaɓogbo, also called Guébié or Gebye. The varieties have limited mutual intelligibility and are often treated as separate languages. In 1993, Yocoboué Dida had 101,600 speakers and Lakota Dida had 93,800 speakers. Yocoboué Dida includes the Lozoua, or Lozwa, and Divo varieties, with 7,100 and 94,500 speakers respectively. Lakota Dida includes the Lakota, Abou, and Vata varieties. The prestige variety is the Lozoua speech of Guitry.

== Phonology ==
The Dida varieties have consonant and vowel inventories typical of the Eastern Kru languages. Tone, however, varies considerably among the varieties, or at least among available descriptions. The following account is based mainly on Miller's description of Abou Dida and Masson's description of Yocoboué Dida.

=== Vowels ===
==== Abou Dida ====
Abou Dida has a ten-vowel system. It includes five non-contracted vowels, four contracted vowels, and an uncommon mid central vowel, /ə/. The contracted vowels are described as involving tenseness, probably either pharyngealization or supraglottal phonation, of a type comparable to retracted tongue root (−ATR) articulation.

Oral vowel phonemes of Abou Dida
	Front		Central	Back	
	Non-contracted	Contracted	Central	Non-contracted	Contracted
Close	i			u	
Mid	e	eˤ	ə	o	oˤ
Open-mid		ɛˤ			ɔˤ
Open			a		

The contracted vowels are transcribed here as /eˤ ɛˤ ɔˤ oˤ/. They may also be analyzed as /iˤ eˤ oˤ uˤ/, but the lower vowel symbols reflect their phonetic realization. There is no contracted counterpart to /a/. The formants of the contracted vowels show that they are lower than their non-contracted counterparts: the highest contracted vowels overlap in formant values with the non-contracted mid vowels. When articulated carefully, the contracted vowels are also accompanied by visible tension in the lips and throat.

Abou Dida has several diphthongs, with the same tonal contrasts as simple vowels. Diphthongs begin with one of the higher vowels, /i eˤ u oˤ/. Except where /a/ occurs as the second element, both elements of a diphthong are either contracted or non-contracted. Pharyngealization is therefore transcribed after the second vowel element. Examples include /ɓue˨teoˤ˥˩/ 'bottle'; /pa˨ɺeaˤ˨˩/ 'get stuck'; and /feɔˤ˥˩/ 'little bone'.

Abou Dida also has nasal vowels, although they are uncommon and their exact number is uncertain. Examples include /fẽˤː˥/ 'nothing', /ɡ͡boũ˧/ 'chin', and /pɔõˤ˥˧/ 'twenty-five cents', from English pound. In diphthongs, nasalization occurs mainly on the second vowel element.

Vowel length is not contrastive, except in limited contexts such as phonaesthesia, morphological contractions, and shortened grammatical words. An example is the modal /kă˥/ 'will', compared with its likely lexical source /ka˧/ 'get'.

==== Yocoboué Dida ====
Yocoboué Dida has a nine-vowel system, with four +ATR vowels and five −ATR vowels.

Oral vowel phonemes of Yocoboué Dida
	Front		Central	Back	
	+ATR	−ATR	−ATR	+ATR	−ATR
Close	i	ɪ		u	ʊ
Mid	e	ɛ		o	ɔ
Open			a		

=== Consonants ===
==== Abou Dida ====
The consonant inventory of Abou Dida is typical of Eastern Kru:

Abou Dida consonant phonemes
		Labial	Alveolar	Post-alveolar	Palatal	Velar	Labialized velar	Labial–velar
Nasal		m	n		ɲ	ŋ		
Plosive	voiceless	p	t			k	kʷ	k͡p
Plosive	voiced	b	d			ɡ	ɡʷ	ɡ͡b
Affricate	voiceless			t͡ʃ				
Affricate	voiced			d͡ʒ				
Implosive		ɓ						
Fricative	voiceless	f	s					
Fricative	voiced	v	z			ɣ		
Tap			ɺ					
Approximant					j			w

Syllables may consist of a vowel alone, a consonant followed by a vowel, or a consonant followed by /ɺ/ and a vowel. The phoneme /ɺ/ is realized as a lateral approximant [l] word-initially, as a lateral flap [ɺ] between vowels and after most consonants, as in [ɓɺeˤ˥] 'country', and as a central tap [ɾ] after alveolar consonants, as in [dɾu˧] 'blood'. After nasal consonants, it is nasalized and resembles a short [n]. A short epenthetic vowel occurs between the initial consonant and the flap; it takes the quality of the following syllabic vowel, as in [ɓᵉɺeˤ˥] 'country'.

Flap clusters occur with all consonants, including the approximants, as in /wɺi˥/ 'top'. They do not occur with the alveolar sonorants /n/ and /ɺ/, or with the marginal consonant /ɣ/, which is attested only in the syllable /ɣa/.

The consonant /ɓ/ is implosive in that its airstream is produced by downward movement of the glottis, although there is no audible rush of air into the mouth. The consonant /ɣ/ occurs in few lexical items, but one of them, /ɣa˧/ 'appear', is found in numerous common idioms; the sound is therefore not rare in connected speech. It is a true fricative and may be devoiced to [x] word-initially.

The sequences /kʷ/ and /ɡʷ/ followed by a vowel are distinct from /k/ or /ɡ/ followed by /u/ and another vowel. They may also be followed by a flap, as in /kʷɺeˤ˥/ 'face'.

Under emphasis, words with no phonemic onset may take initial [ɦ], and the initial approximants /j/ and /w/ may be realized as fricated [ʝ] and [ɣʷ]. The approximant /w/ is realized as [ɥ] before high front vowels, or as [ʝʷ] under emphasis.

==== Yocoboué Dida ====
The following consonants are reported for Yocoboué Dida:

Yocoboué Dida consonant phonemes
		Labial	Alveolar	Palatal	Velar	Labialized velar	Labial–velar
Nasal		m	n	ɲ	ŋ		
Plosive	voiceless	p	t	c	k	kʷ	k͡p
Plosive	voiced	b	d	ɟ	ɡ	ɡʷ	ɡ͡b
Implosive		ɓ					
Fricative	voiceless	f	s				
Fricative	voiced	v	z		ɣ		
Approximant			l	j			w

In Yocoboué Dida, /l/ may be realized as [ɾ] after alveolar stops and as [ɾ̃] after nasals.

=== Tones ===
Dida uses tone grammatically. Morphotonology plays a larger role in verb and pronominal paradigms than in nouns. This may account for the simpler tonal system of verb roots: noun roots have four lexically contrastive tones, subject pronouns have three, and verb roots have two word tones.

Abou Dida has three level tones: high /˥/, mid /˧/, and low /˨/. The mid tone is approximately twice as frequent as either high or low tone. Speakers also identify six contour tones: two rising tones, /˧˥/ and /˨˧/, and four falling tones, /˥˧/, /˥˩/, /˧˩/, and /˨˩/. The falling tones reach bottom register only at the end of a prosodic unit; elsewhere, the low falling tone /˨˩/ is realized as a simple low tone. Some contour tones occur only in morphologically complex forms, such as perfective verbs.

Monosyllabic nouns contrast four tones: high, mid, low, and mid-falling. Examples include /d͡ʒeˤ˥/ 'egg', /d͡ʒeˤ˧/ 'leopard', /d͡ʒeˤ˩/ 'buffalo', and /d͡ʒeˤ˧˩/ 'arrow'. High and mid tones are the most frequent.

== Sources ==
- Masson, Denis (1992). "Esquisse phonologique du dida de Yocoboué" [Phonological sketch of Yocoboué Dida]. In Egner, Inge (ed.). Esquisses phonologiques de trois langues ivoiriennes: beng, dida, yaouré [Phonological sketches of three Ivorian languages: Beng, Dida, Yaouré]. Esquisses linguistiques ivoiriennes (in French). Vol. 1. Abidjan; Paris: Institut de Linguistique Appliquée; Agence de Coopération Culturelle et Technique. pp. 1–56.
- Miller, Kirk (2005). The Tones of Abou Dida (Kru, Ivory Coast) (MA thesis). University of California at Santa Barbara. OCLC 73514251.
