= Sapo language =

Kru language spoken in Liberia

Sapo
- Native to: Liberia
- Native speakers: 36,000 (2006)
- Language family: Niger–Congo?: Atlantic–Congo; Kru; Western Kru; Wee; Guere–Krahn; Sapo

Language codes
- ISO 639-3: krn
- Glottolog: sapo1251

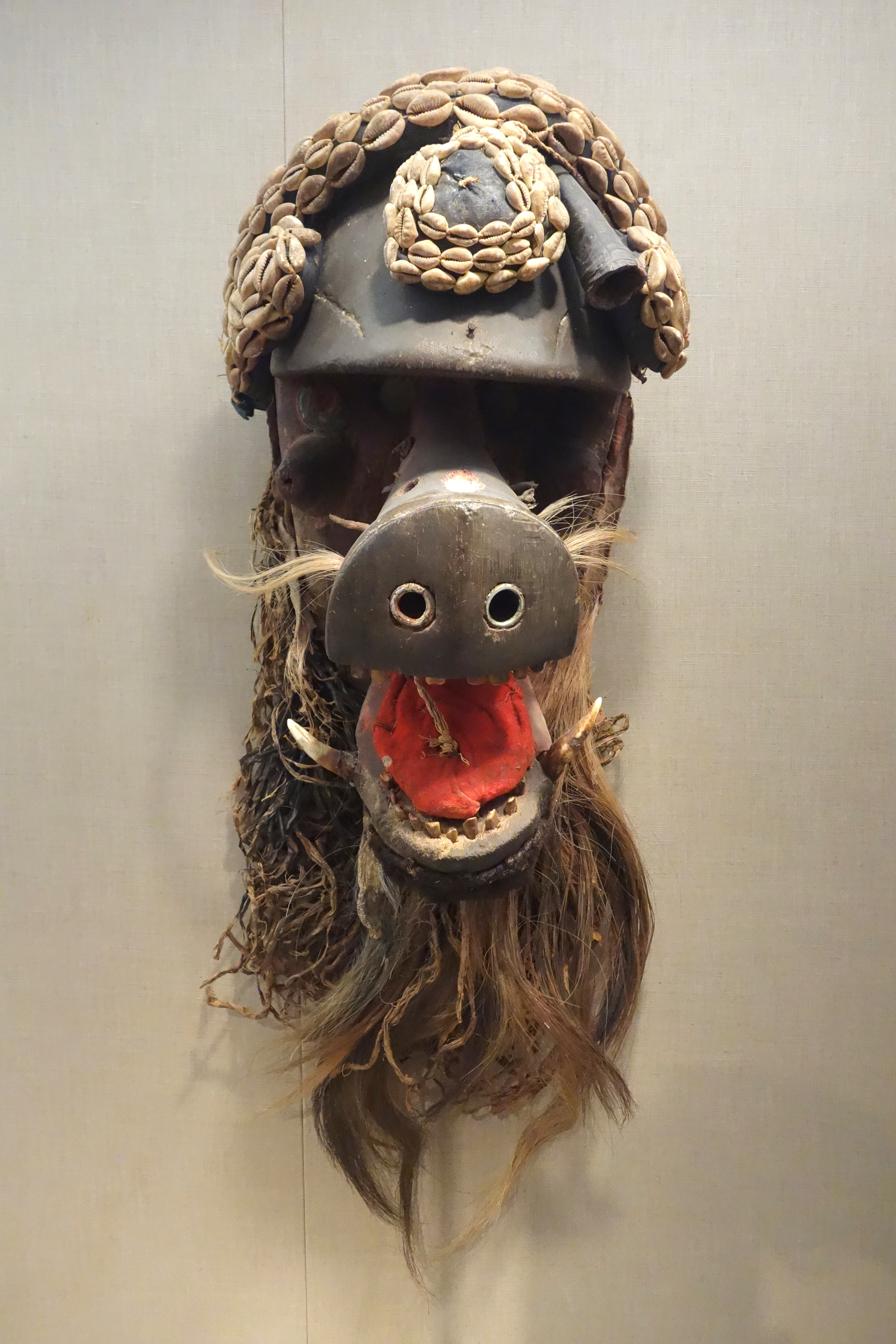

The Sapo language, also known as Sarpo or Southern Krahn, is a Kru language of the Niger–Congo language family. It is spoken in eastern Liberia, primarily in Grand Gedeh County and Sinoe County, by the Sapo people. Its dialects include: Juarzon, Kabade (Karbardae), Nomopo (Nimpo), Putu, Sinkon (Senkon), and Waya (Wedjah).

== See also ==
- Languages of Africa
- Krahn people
