= Krumen language =

Kru dialect continuum of Ivory Coast and Liberia

Krumen
- Native to: Ivory Coast, Liberia
- Native speakers: (50,000 cited 1993)
- Language family: Niger–Congo?: Atlantic–Congo; Kru; Western Kru; Grebo; Krumen

Language codes
- ISO 639-3: Variously: ted – Tepo pye – Pye ktj – Plapo
- Glottolog: ivor1240
- ELP: Plapo Krumen

Krumen is a dialect continuum spoken by the Krumen people of Liberia and Ivory Coast (Tabou and Grabo subprefectures). It is a branch of the Grebo languages, a subfamily of the Kru languages and ultimately of the Niger–Congo languages. It had 48,300 speakers in 1993. The main varieties are:

- Tepo: Tepo, Bapo, Wlopo / Ropo, Dapo, Honpo, Yrepo / Kapo, Glawlo dialects
- Pye: Trepo, Wluwe-Hawlo, Gbowe-Hran, Wlepo, Dugbo, Yrewe / Giriwe / Jrwe [ɟʀwe] / Jrewe, Yapo, Pie dialects
- Plapo

Plapo has only a hundred speakers and no dialectal variation.

== See also ==
- Kru Pidgin English
