= Bété languages =

Language cluster of Kru languages spoken in Ivory Coast

Bété
- Bete
- Region: Ivory Coast
- Ethnicity: Bété people
- Language family: Niger–Congo?: Atlantic–Congo; Kru; Eastern Kru; Bété
- Dialects: Western Bété (including Kuya); Eastern Bété (including Godié)

Language codes
- ISO 639-3: –
- Glottolog: bete1265

The Bété languages are a language cluster of Kru languages spoken in central-western Ivory Coast. There are many dialects but they can be grouped as follows:

- Western
  - Bété of Gagnoa
  - Kouya
- Eastern
  - Bété of Guiberoua
  - Bété of Daloa
  - Godié

== Bibliography ==
- Zogbo, Raymond Gnoléba Parlons bété: Une langue de Côte d'Ivoire (L'Harmattan) 2004
- Zogbo, Raymond Gnoléba, Dictionnaire bété-français, Abidjan : Éditions du CERAP, 2005.
- Lowe, Ivan, Edwin Arthur, and Philip Saunders. 2003. "Eventivity in Kouya." In Mary Ruth Wise, Thomas N. Headland and Ruth M. Brend (eds.), Language and life: essays in memory of Kenneth L. Pike, 429-448. SIL International and The University of Texas at Arlington Publications in Linguistics, 139. Dallas: SIL International and University of Texas at Arlington.
- Saunders, Philip and Eddie Arthur. 1996. Lexique sokuya, sokuya–français, français–sokuya. Abidjan/Vavoua: Projet Linguistique Sokuya. iv, 80 p.
- Arthur Eddie & Sue, Saunders Philip & Heather. 1995 Sɔkɔwɛlɩɩ ʼwʋzɛlɩ -sɛbhɛ (Syllabaire sokuya). Abidjan: Société Internationale de Linguistique.

== See also ==
- Bété syllabary
- Frédéric Bruly Bouabré
