= Konobo language =

Kru language of Liberia

Konobo
- Eastern Krahn
- Native to: Liberia
- Ethnicity: Krahn
- Native speakers: 99,000 in Liberia (2020) undated figure of 10,600 (< 2013) in Ivory Coast
- Language family: Niger–Congo?: Atlantic–Congo; Kru; Western Kru; Wee; Konobo

Language codes
- ISO 639-3: kqo
- Glottolog: east2414

A Konobo speaker, recorded in Liberia.

Konobo, or Eastern Krahn, is a Kru language of Liberia.

Krahn is part of the Wee dialect continuum. Whereas Konobo dialect may be considered a distinct language from Western Krahn dialects, both are intelligible with intermediate dialects.
