= Kru languages =

Language family of Liberia and Ivory Coast

Kru
- Geographic distribution: Ivory Coast, Liberia, Burkina Faso
- Linguistic classification: Niger–Congo?: disputed; Kru
- Proto-language: Proto-Kru
- Subdivisions: Aïzi (5); Eastern Kru (4); Kuwaa (2); ? Seme (1); Western Kru (3)

Language codes
- ISO 639-2 / 5: kro
- Glottolog: krua1234 Kru siam1242 Siamou
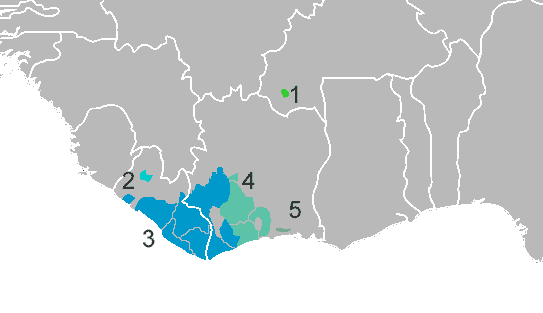
- Kru languages, labeled as above

The Kru languages are spoken by the Kru people from the southeast of Liberia to the west of Ivory Coast.

== Classification ==
According to Güldemann (2018), Kru lacks sufficient lexical resemblances and noun class resemblances to conclude a relationship with Niger-Congo. Glottolog considers Kru an independent language family.

== Etymology ==
The term "Kru" is of unknown origin. According to Westermann (1952) it was used by Europeans to denote a number of tribes speaking related dialects. Marchese (1989) notes the fact that many of these peoples were recruited as "crew" by European seafarers; "the homonymy with crew is obvious, and is at least one source of the confusion among Europeans that there was a Kru/crew tribe".

== History ==
Andrew Dalby noted the historical importance of the Kru languages for their position at the crossroads of African-European interaction. He wrote that "Kru and associated languages were among the first to be encountered by European voyagers on what was then known as the Pepper Coast, a centre of the production and export of Guinea and melegueta pepper; a once staple African seaborne trade". The Kru languages are known for some of the most complex tone systems in Africa, rivaled perhaps only by the Omotic languages.

== Current status ==
Recent documentation has noted "Kru societies can now be found along the coast of Monrovia, Liberia to Bandama River in Côte d'Ivoire". "Villages maintain their ties based on presumed common descent, reinforced by ceremonial exchanges and gifts". The Kru people and their languages, although now many speak English (in Liberia) or French (in Côte d'Ivoire) as a second language, are said to be "dominant in the southwest region where the forest zone reaches the coastal lagoons". The Kru people rely on the forest for farming, supplemented by hunting for their livelihood.

== Subgroups and associated languages ==
The Kru languages include many subgroups such as Kuwaa, Grebo, Bassa, Belle, Belleh, Kwaa and many others. According to Breitbonde, categorization of communities based on cultural distinctiveness, historical or ethnic identity, and socio-political autonomy "may have brought about the large number of distinct Kru dialects; "Although the natives were in many respects similar in type and tribe, every village was an independent state; there was also very little intercommunication". Breitbonde notes the Kru people were categorized based on their cultural distinctiveness, separate historical or ethnic identities, and social and political autonomy. This is the possible reason for so many subgroups of the Kru language. As noted by Fisiak, there is very little documentation on the Kru and associated languages.

Marchese's (1989) classification of Kru languages is as follows. Many of these languages are dialect clusters and are sometimes considered more than a single language.

- Kru
  - Sɛmɛ (Siamou)
    - Aizi
    - Kuwaa
    - Kru proper
      - Eastern Kru
        - Bakwe
          - Bakwe
          - Wane
        - Bété
          - Kuya
          - Godié
        - Dida
        - Kwadia (Kodia) (Kwadia)
      - Western Kru
        - Bassa
          - Bassa
          - Dewoin
          - Gbii
        - Grebo
          - Grebo (Jabo)
          - Krumen
          - Glio-Oubi
        - Klao
          - Klao
          - Tajuasohn
        - Wèè
          - Guere
            - Daho-Doo
            - Glaro-Twabo
            - Sapo
            - Guere (Wè)
            - Krahn
          - Nyabwa
          - Konobo
          - Wobé

Ethnologue adds Neyo, which may be closest to Dida or Godie.

== Grammar ==
Kru word order is primarily subject–verb–object (SVO), but can also often be subject–object–verb (SOV).

== Comparative vocabulary ==
Sample basic vocabulary of 12 Kru languages from Marchese (1983):

Language	eye	ear	nose	tooth	tongue	mouth	blood	bone	tree	water	eat	name
Tepo	jíê	nω̂â	mɪ̂jã́	ɲɛ́	mɛ̂	wũ̂t	dâblώ	klá	tûgbɛ̀	nîjẽ́	dî	dώ
Jrwe	ɟró	nω̃̂ã̂	mɪ̃̂ã̂	ɲɛ̃́	mɛ̃̂	wṹ	klώω̂	klá	túwɛ̀	nĩ́ẽ́	dîdɛ̂	ɲɔ̃́
Guere	ɟrííē	dōṹ	mlâ	ɲnɪ̃̂ɛ̄̃	mē̃õ̀	ŋɔ̄̃	ɲmɔ̄̃	kpâ	tū	ní	dîɛ̄	ɲnɪ̃̂
Wobé	ɟríɛ́	dōṹ	mlã̂	ɲnə̃̂	mɛ̄̃õ̀	ŋʷɔ̄̃	nmɔ̄	kpâ	tū	nĩ́	dī	ɲnẽ̂
Niaboua	ɟîrî	lòkû	máná	ɲéɲé	méɛ̃̀	ŋʷɔ̄̃	ɲēmō	kpá	tū	nî	dī	ɲéɲé
Bété (Daloa)	ɟi	jûkûlî	mlə̂	gléí	mɪ́ɔ́	ŋō	drú	kwâ	sū	ɲû	lí	ŋʉ̂nɪ̂
Bété (Guibéroua)	jiri	júkwɨ́lí	mə́ɲə́	gʌ̂lʌ̂	mɪ̄ɔ̄	nûə̂	dûrû	kwá	sû	ɲú	dī	ŋʉ́ɲɪ́
Néyo	jɪ́	ɲúkwlí	mlé	glè	mɪ̄ɔ̄	né	dòlū	féē	sūú	ɲú	lī	jlɪ́
Godié	jɨdí	ɲūkúlú	mə́ɲə́	gə̄lè	mɪ̄ɔ̄	nə̄	drù	féè	sū	ɲú	ɗɨ̄	ŋʉ́nʉ́
Koyo	jɪjē	ɲúkiwí	—	glà	mɪ̄ɔ̄	nə́	dòlú	féjē	sūú	ɲú	lɨ̄	ŋɨ́nɨ́
Dida	cí	ɲúkwlí	mné	glā	mɪ̄ɔ̄	nɪ̄	dólū	kwíjè	sū	ɲú	lî	ŋlɪ́
Aïzi	zre	lωkɔ	mωvɔ	ɲɪ	mrɔ	mu	ɲre	kra	ke	nrɪ	li	—

An additional sample basic vocabulary of 21 Kru languages from Marchese (1983):

Language	eye	ear	nose	tooth	tongue	mouth	blood	bone	water	eat	name
Aïzi	zre	lωkɔ	mωvɔ	ɲɪ	mrɔ	mu	ɲre	kra	nrɪ	li	
Vata	jé	ɲêflú	mênê	glà	meɔ̄	nɪ̄	dūlū	fâ	ɲú	lî	
Dida	cí	ɲúkwlí	mné	glā	mɪ̄ɔ̄	nɪ̄	dòlū	kwíjè	ɲú	lî	ŋlɪ́
Koyo	jíjē	ɲúkwlí	ŋʉ́nʉ́	glà	mɪ̄ɔ̄	nə́	dòlú	féjē	ɲú	lɨ̄	ŋɨ́nɨ́
Godié		ɲūkúlú	mə́ňə́	gə̀lè	mɪ̄ɔ̄	nə̄	dřù	féè	ɲú	ɗɨ̄	ŋʉ́nʉ́
Néyo	jɪ́	ɲúkwlí	mlé	glè	mɪ̄ɔ̄	né	dòlū	féē	ɲú	lī	jlɪ́
Bété (Guibéroua)	jiři	júkwɨ́lí	mə́ňə́	gʌ̂lâ	mɪ̄ɔ̄	nûə̂	dûřû	kwá	ɲú	lī	nʉ́nɪ́
Bété (Daloa)	ɟi	jûkûlî	mlə̂	gléí	mɪ́ɔ́	ŋō	dřú	kwâ	ɲú	lí	nʉ̀nɪ̂
Niaboua		lòkû	mə́ná	ɲéné	méɛ̃̀	ŋwɔ̃̄	ɲēmō	kpá	nî	dī	ɲéné
Wobé	ɟríɛ́	dōṹ	mlã̂	ɲnẽ̂	mɛ̄ɔ̃̀	ŋwɔ̃̄	nmɔ̄	kpâ	nĩ́	dī	ɲnẽ̂
Guéré	ɟrííē	dōṹ	mlâ	ɲnɪ̃̂ẽ̄	mẽ̄õ̀	ŋɔ̃̄	ɲmɔ̃̄	kpâ	ní	dìɛ̄	ɲnɪ̃̂
Konobo	jidɔ	nao	mlã		mɛ		daluo	kla	ɲɛ	di	ɲi
Oubi	jīrō	nōā	mēã̄			ŋu	dòùlā	kala	ɲɛ́	dīdɛ̄	ɲírṍ
Bakwe	ɲʉ́	ɲákúlú	mňṍ	glɛ̀	mɛ̄	mʌ́	tùřú	kɔ̄ō	nē	ɟɨ	nrɪ
Tépo	jíê	nω̂â	mɪ̂jã́	ɲɛ́	mɛ́		dâblώ	klá	nîjẽ́	dî	dώ
Grebo	jê	nóá	méá		mɛ̄	ŋwúnɔ̄	ɲénɔ́	klã́	nĩ́	dí	ɲéné
Klao	ɟí	nɔ̄kũ̀	mnã́		mɛ̄	wɔ̃̄	ɲnɔ̄	kpã́	nĩ́	dī	ɲnɛ̃́
Bassa	ɟélé		máná		miɔ	wɔ̃̄	nyɔmɔɔ	kpá	ní	ɗi	ŋɛ́nɛ́
Dewoin	gire		málã́		mīlã̀	wɔ̃̄ĩ́	ɲimo	gba	ní	zī	ŋɛ́lɛ́
Kuwaa	sĩ̌	nɔi	ɲũ		mɛ̀wũ	wɔ̃̀	tòyò	kwa	nímí	ɟì	ɲɛlɛ̃
Sɛmɛ	ɲa	tasjẽ	mar	ɲen	dɛ	kõ	tõ	kpar	nũ	di	jĩ

=== Numerals ===
Comparison of numerals in individual languages:

Classification	Language	1	2	3	4	5	6	7	8	9	10
Kuwaa	Kuwaa (Belleh)	dee	sɔ̃r	tãã̀	ɲìjɛ̀hɛ	wàyɔ̀ɔ	wɔ̀rfɔlɛ̀ (5 + 1)	kɔrlɔrɔ̃r (5 + 2)	kwatãã̀ (5 + 3)	kɔ̃yĩ̀yɛ̀hɛ (5 + 4)	kowaa
Seme	Seme (Siamou) (1)	byẽ́ẽ	nĩ́ĩ̄	tyáār	yūr	kwɛ̃̄l	kpã̄â	kĩ̄î	kprɛ̄n̂	kɛ̄l	fú
Seme	Seme (Siamou) (2)	dyuɔ̃15	nĩ15	tyɛr15	yur3	kwɛ̃l3	k͡pa4a34	kyi4ĩ34	k͡prɛ4ɛ̃34	kal3	fu1
Eastern, Bakwe	Bakwé	ɗôː	sɔ̂ː	tʌ̄ː	mɾɔ̄ː	ɡ͡bə̀ə̄	ŋǔːɗō (5 + 1)	ŋǔːsɔ̄ (5 + 2)	ŋǔːtʌ̄ (5 + 3)	ŋǔːmɾɔ̄ (5 + 4)	pʊ̀
Eastern, Bakwe	Wané	do³ / ɗo³	sɔ²	ta³	ⁱhɪɛ̃⁴	ŋʷũ⁴²	ŋʷũ⁴² kloː²⁴(5 + 1)	ŋʷũ⁴² sɔ² (5 + 2)	ŋʷũ⁴² ta³ (5 + 3)	ŋʷũ⁴² ⁱhɪɛ̃⁴ (5 + 4)	ŋʷũ⁴² bu⁴ or bu⁴
Eastern, Bete	Daloa Bété	ɓlʊ̄	sɔ̋	tá	mʊ̄wana	ŋ́ɡ͡bɨ́	ŋ́ɡ͡bʊplʊ (5 + 1)	ŋ́ɡ͡bisɔ́ (5 + 2)	ɡ͡bʊ̀wata (5 + 3)	ŋ́ɡ͡bimʊwana (5 + 4)	kʊ́ɡ͡ba
Eastern, Bete	Guiberoua Bété	ɓlʊ̄	sɔ̋	tá	mʊ̄wana	ŋ́ɡ͡bɨ́	ŋ́ɡ͡bʊplʊ (5 + 1)	ŋ́ɡ͡bisɔ́ (5 + 2)	ɡ͡bʊ̀wata (5 + 3)	ŋ́ɡ͡bimʊwana (5 + 4)	kʊ́ɡ͡ba
Eastern, Bete	Godié	ɓlōō	sɔ́ɔ́	tāā	ŋ̀mɔ̀ɔ̀nā	ŋ̀ɡ͡bɨ́	ŋ̀ɡ͡bóplóo (5 + 1)	ŋ̀ɡ͡bɔ̀ɔ́sɔ́ (5 + 2)	ŋ̀ɡ͡bàátā (5 + 3)	ŋ̀vɔ̀ɔ̀nā	kʊ́ɡ͡bá
Eastern, Bete, Eastern	Gagnoa Bété	ɓɵ̯̀ɺō	sɔ̋	tɑ̄	mɔ̀ɔ̀nɔ̄	ŋ͡m̩̄.ɡ͡bú	ɡ͡bé.pó̯ɺó (5 + 1)	ɡ͡bɔ́ɔ́.sɔ̋ (5 + 2)	ɡ͡bɔ̋ɔ́.tā (5 + 3)	fɛ̀ɛ̀.nɔ̄	kō.ɡ͡bɔ́
Eastern, Bete, Eastern	Guébie Bété	ɡ͡bɔlɔ².³	so⁴	ta³¹	mɔna¹.³¹	mŋɡ͡be²	mŋɡ͡beɡ͡bɔlɔ².².³ (5 + 1)	mŋɡ͡boso³.⁴ (5 + 2)	mŋɡ͡bata³.³¹ (5 + 3)	mŋɡ͡bɔfɛna³.¹.³¹ (5 + 4)	kɔɡ͡ba².³
Eastern, Bete, Eastern	Kouya	ɓlò	sɔ́	tā	mnʊ̀à	ɡ͡bu	ɡ͡beliɓlò (5 + 1)	ɡ͡besɔ́ (5 + 2)	ɡ͡betā (5 + 3)	ɡ͡bomnʊ̀à (5 + 4)	kuɡ͡bua
Eastern, Dida	Yocoboué Dida	bóló	mwɔsɔ́	mwɔtá	mwɔná	ɛŋɡ͡bɪ́	ɛŋɡ͡bʊ́frɔ (5 + 1)	ɛmɓɔ́sɔ́ (5 + 2)	ɛmɓáta (5 + 3)	ɛmvwaná	kóɡ͡ba
Eastern, Dida	Neyo	ɓɔ̄ló	sɔ́	tāā	mɔ̀nā	ɡ͡bɪ́	ɡ͡bɪ́flɔ́ (5 + 1)	ɡ͡básɔ́ (5 + 2)	ɡ͡bátā (5 + 3)	fɛ̄nā (5 + 4)	kʊ́ɡ͡bá
Eastern, Kwadia	Kodia	ɡ͡bɤlɤ³² / ɓɤlɤ³²	sɔː²	taː²	mɔna⁴³	ⁿɡ͡bɤ³	ⁿɡ͡bɤwlɤ³³³ (5 + 1)	ⁿɡ͡bɔː⁴³sɔ³ (5 + 2)	ⁿɡ͡baː⁴³ta³ (5 + 3)	ⁿɡ͡bɤmɔna³⁴³ (5 + 4)	kʊɡ͡ba³³
Western, Bassa	Bassa	ɖò, dyúáɖò	sɔ̃́	tã	hĩinyɛ	hm̀m̌	mɛ̀nɛ̌ìn-ɖò (5 + 1)	mɛ̀nɛ̌ìn-sɔ̃́ (5 + 2)	mɛ̀nɛ̌ìn-tã (5 + 3)	mɛ̀nɛ̌ìn-hĩinyɛ (5 + 4)	ɓaɖa-bùè
Western, Bassa	Dewoin (Dewoi)	ɡ͡bǒ	sɔ̃́	ta	hĩinyɛ	hm̀m̌	meɖe-ɡ͡bǒ (5 + 1)	meɖe-sɔ̃́ (5 + 2)	meɖe-ta (5 + 3)	meɖe-hĩinyɛ (5 + 4)	vù
Western, Bassa	Gbasei (Gbii) (1)	dɔ̀ː / ɗɔ̀káⁱ	sɔ̃́	tã	ɲ̀yɛ̃	m̀ḿ	m̀mɽědɔ̀ (5 + 1)	m̀mɽěsɔ̃́ (5 + 2)	m̀mɽětã́ (5 + 3)	m̀mɽěɲ̀yɛ̃ (5 + 4)	báɽápʰùwe
Western, Bassa	Gbii (Gbi-Dowlu) (2)	dòò, dyúáɖò	sɔ̃́	tã	hĩ̀nyɛ	hm̀m̀	mɛ̀nɛ̀ɛ̄n-ɖò (5 + 1)	mɛ̀nɛ̀ɛ̄n-sɔ̃́ (5 + 2)	mɛ̀nɛ̀ɛ̄n-tə̃ (5 + 3)	mɛ̀nɛ̀ɛ̄n-hĩ̀nyɛ (5 + 4)	ɓaɖabùè
Western, Grebo, Glio-Oubi	Glio-Oubi	dō	hwə̃	tã́	hə̃	ɡ͡bə̀	hṹdò (5 + 1)	hũ̀sɔ́ (5 + 2)	mɛra (5 + 3)	mɛ́ɲɛ̀ (5 + 4)	pue
Western, Grebo, Ivorian	Pye (Piè) Krumen	dò	hʋɛ̃́	tā	hɛ̃̀	hũ̌	hũ̀jārō [hũ̀jāɾō] ('five plus one')	hũ̀jāhʋɛ̃́ ('five plus two')	hũ̀jātā ('five plus three')	hũ̀jāhɛ̃̀ ('five plus four')	pù
Western, Grebo, Ivorian	Tepo Krumen (1)	dò	hɔ̃́	tā	hɛ̃̀	hũ̌	huõ̀nɔ̀ (5 + 1)	nɪ́pātā (litː 'not/be/three')	nɪ́pāhɔ̃́, yèhɛ̃̀yèhɛ̃̀ (2 x 4)	sēlédò (litː 'remains /there/one')	pù
Western, Grebo, Ivorian	Tepo Krumen (2)	dô	ɔ̄ɛ́n	tā	hɛ̀n	ùm	ùmnɔ̄dô (5 + 1)	ùmnɔ̄ɔ̄ɛ́n (5 + 2)	blɛ̄nbìɛ̀n	ùmīyándō	pù
Western, Grebo, Liberian	Central Grebo (Barrobo)	dòo	ɔ̌n	taan	hɛ̃ɛn	wùun	wùnɔ̀dǒ (5 + 1)	jetan (4 + 3) ?	jiinhɛ̀n (4 + 4) ?	sǒndò (litː 'remain one' before 10)	fù
Western, Grebo, Liberian	Northern Grebo	do	sɔ̃̌	tã	hɛ̃̀	m̀m	mmɔ̀do (5 + 1)	nyiɛtã (4 + 3)	nnyɛɛ (4 + 4)	siědo (litː 'remain one' before 10)	pù
Western, Klao	Klao	dô	sɔ́n	tan	nyìɛ̀	mù	mùnéɛ́do (5 + 1)	mùnéɛ́sɔ́n (5 + 2)	mùnéɛtan (5 + 3)	sopádo (10 - 1)	puè
Western, Klao	Tajuasohn	doe	sunn nn = ?	tan	hin	hoom	ḿhon doe (5 + 1)	ḿhon sunn (5 + 2)	hinin (4 + 4)	siɛrdoe (litː 'remains one')	punn
Western, Wee, Guere-Krahn	Western Krahn	tòò	sɔɔ̌n	ta̓a̓n	nyìɛ̓	m̀m̌	mɛ̀o̓ (5 + 1)	mɛ̀sɔɔ̌n (5 + 2)	mɛta̓a̓ǹ (5 + 3)	mɛ̀nyìɛ̓ (5 + 4)	pùèè
Western, Wee, Guere-Krahn	Sapo	duě / tòò	sɔn	tan	nyìɛ	m̀m̌	mɛ̀lǒ (5 + 1)	mɛ̀sɔn (5 + 2)	mɛ̌tan (5 + 3)	mɛ̌nyiɛ (5 + 4)	pùè
Western, Wee, Nyabwa	Nyabwa (Nyaboa)	do4	sɔ̃2	tã3	ɲiɛ33	mu4u1	mɛ4ɛ1lo4 (5 + 1)	mɛ4ɛ1sɔ̃2 (5 + 2)	mɛ4ɛ1tã3 (5 + 4)	mɛ4ɛ1ɲiɛ33 (5 + 5)	bue44
Western, Wee, Wobe	Northern Wè (Wobe)	too3 / due1	sɔɔn2 / sɔn2	taan3	nyiɛ43	mm41	mɛ41o3 (5 + 1)	mɛ41sɔn2 (5 + 2)	mɛ41na3 (5 + 3)	mɛ41nyiɛ3 (5 + 4)	puue3

Comparison of numerals in Kru languages from Marchese (1983):

Classification	Language	one	two	three	four	five	six	seven	eight	nine	ten	twenty	hundred
Siamou	Seme	jɔ	nḭ	tʸar	yiro	kʷḛ	kpaa	kʸii	prɛ	kal	fu	kar	karkʷḛ
Aizi	Aïzi	mṵmɔ̰; yre	iʃɪ	ita	yeɓi	yugbo	fɔ	friʃi	patɛ	fi	bɔ	gu	juyugbo
Kuwaa	Kuwaa	dee	sɔ̰ɔ̰	ta̰à̰	ɲìyɛ̀	wààyò	folɛ̀	kɔ̰lo̰	kʷata̰à̰	ko̰yḭ̀yɛ̰̀	kuwa	kuma sɔ̰᷄	kɔ̀lɛwúlú
Eastern, Bakwe	Bakwé (Soubré)												
Eastern, Dida	Dida (Lozoua)	mblò	mɔ̀sɔ́	mɔ̀tā	mɔ̀ɔ̀nā	ǹgbī	ǹgbʊfɾʊ	ǹgbɔ̀ɔ́sɔ́	ǹgbàátā	ǹvɔ̀ɔ̀nā	kʊ́gbā	grʊ̄	gwlīǹgbī
Eastern, Dida	Vata	ɓlɔ̀	sɔ̍	tā	mɔ̀ɔ̀nā	gbe̍		gbòɔ́sɔ́	gbɔ̍fɔ́tā		kógba̍	golō	
Eastern, Bete	Bété (Daloa)	ɓʊ̀lʊ̀	sɔ̍	tá	mʊ̀nà	ńgbɨ́	ńgbʊ́pʊ́lʊ́	ńgbísɔ̍	ńgbɔ̍tá	ńgbɨ́mʊ̀nà	kúgbɨ́á	gʊ́lʊ́	gʊ́lúgbɨ́
Eastern, Bete	Bété (Guibéroua)	ɓʊ̀lʊ̀	sɔ́	tā	mʊ̀ʌ̀nā	n̄gbɨ́	n̄gbʊ̍pʊ̍lʊ̍	n̄gbi̍só	gbʊ̀ʌ́tā	n̄gbɨ̍mʊ̀ʌ̀nā	kʊ̄gbʌ̍	gʊ̍lʊ̍	gʷʉ̍lɪ̍n̄gbɨ̍
Eastern, Bete	Godié	ɓʉ̄lʉ̄	sɔ́	tā	mʊ̀ʊ̀nʌ̄	ʌ̰̀gbʉ̄	ʌ̰̀gbʉ̄pʉ̄lʉ̄	ʌ̰̀gbɔ̀ɔ̄sɔ́	ʌ̰̀gbàāɨʌ̄	pɛɛ̀nʌ̄	kʊ́gbʌ̍	gɔ̀lɔ̀	gʷʌ̀lɪ̀gbʉ̄
Eastern, Bete	Koyo	ɓɔ̄lɔ̄	sɔ̄	tā	mɔ̀nā	ŋ̀gbɨ́	ŋ̀gbópló	ŋ̀gbɔ́sɔ́	ŋ̀gbátā	ǹvɔ̀nā	kʊ́gbá	gʊ̄lʊ̄	gʊ̀lɪ̀ɲ́gbɨ́
Eastern, Bete	Néyo	ɓʊ̄lʊ́	sɔ́	tāā	mɔ̀nā	gbɪ́	gbɪ́flɔ́	gbásɔ́	gbátā	fɛ̄nā	kʊ́gbá	glʊ́	gʷlɪ̀gbɪ́
Western, Klao	Klao	dòò	sʊ̰́	tā̰ā̰	ɲḭɛ̀	mùù	ŋmìɛ̀dò	ŋmìɛ̀sɔ̰́	ŋmìɛ̀tā̰	sɛpáádō	pūɪ̄	wlʊ̄	wlʊ̄mù
Western, Bassa	Bassa	dɔ̀ò	sɔ̄	ta̰	hḭiɲɛ	hm̀m̀							hɔ̰́dɔ̀
Western, Bassa	Déwoin	gbò	sɔ̰	tà̰	ɲìɛ̄	m̀m̄	mɛ̀legbō	mɛ̀lēslɔ̰́	mɛ̀lēá̰	mɛ̀le̍ɲìɛ	èvù		
Western, Grebo	Tépo	do̍	hɔ̰́	ta̍	hɛ̰̀	m̄	hwɔ̰̀nɔ̀	nɪ́pa̍hɔ̰̍	nɪ́pa̍ta̍	se̍rédó	pu̍	a̍ wlʊ̀	wlɪ̄ m̄
Western, Grebo	Grébo	dō	sɔ̰́	tá̰	hɛ̰᷄	hm̀ú			béhɛ̰᷄	sīe̍dō	pūnɔ́dō	wōdó	húbū
Western, Grebo	Oubi	dō	hʷə̰	tá̰	hə̰	gbə̀	hṵ́dò	hṵ̀sɔ́	mɛra	mɛ́ɲɛ̀	pue	gōrō	gòléhm̄
Western, Grebo	Jrwe	do̍ò	hʊ̰́ɛ̰́	ta̍a̍	hɛ̰̍ɛ̰̀	hm̀m̍	hm̀m̍jɛ̍rʊ̍	hm̀m̍jɛ̍hʊ̰́ɛ̰́	hm̀m̍ja̍ta̍	hm̀m̍ja̍hɛ̰̀	pu̍	wlʊ̍	wɛ̀srɛ̍wɛ̍
Western, Wee	Guéré	dòò	sɔ̰̍ɔ̰̍	tā̰ā̰	ɲḭ̀ɛ̰̄ ~ ɲīɛ̄; ɲīɛ̄ ~ ɲḭ̀ɛ̰̄	m̄ḿ	mɛ̰̄ɛ̰́ō̰	mɛ̰̄sɔ̰̍	mɛ̰̄á̰	mɛ̰᷄ɲɛ̰̍	bùùè	kwlāsɔ̰̍	km̄ɛ̰̍dūe̍
Western, Wee	Nyabwa	dʊ̀	sɔ̰́	tā̰	ɲìɛ̄	mùu̍	mɛ̄ɛ̍lʊ̀	mɛ̄ɛ̍sɔ̰̄	mɛ̄ɛ̍tā̰	mɛ̍ɲīē	bùè	glòlùé	glàmùu̍
Western, Wee	Wobé	tòò	sɔ̰̍ɔ̰̍	tā̰ā̰	ɲìɛ̄	m̄ḿ	mɛ̄ɛ́ō	mɛ̰̍́sɔ̰̍	mɛ᷄na̍	mɛ᷄ɲɛ̍	pùùè	kwlāsɔ̰̍	km̄ɛ̍du̍e̍
Western, Wee	Konobo	dʊ	buwɛ	la̰a̰	ɲiɛ	mm		mɛɛɔ̰	mɛla		buwɛ	kʷalaso̰	kɛ̰ɛ̰

=== Body parts (head) ===
Parts of the head from Marchese (1983):

Classification	Language	head	hair	eye	ear	nose	tooth	tongue	mouth
Siamou	Seme	gmel	fleɲi	ɲa	tasyḛ	mar	ɲen	dɛ	ko̰
Aizi	Aïzi	drʊ	lɪfɪ	zre	lʊkɔ	mʊvɔ	ɲɪ	mrɔ	mu
Kuwaa	Kuwaa	wúlú	dùi	sḭ̌	nɔi	ɲṵ		mɛ̀wṵ	wɔ̰̀
Eastern, Bakwe	Bakwé (Soubré)	wlí	ɲwee	ɲʉ́	ɲákúlú	ml̰ó̰	glɛ̀	mɛ̄	mʌ́
Eastern, Dida	Dida (Lozoua)	wlú	ɲɪ̄	cí	ɲūklwí	mné	glā	mɪ̄ɔ̄	nɪ̄
Eastern, Dida	Vata		ɲe̍	yé	ɲe̍flú	me̍ne̍	glà	meɔ̄	nɪ̄
Eastern, Bete	Bété (Daloa)	wu̍lu̍kpèlè	ɲúkō	ji	yu̍ku̍li̍	mlə̍	gléí	mɪ́ɔ́	ŋō
Eastern, Bete	Bété (Guibéroua)	wúkpə̀lé	ɲū-kʷə̄	yiɾi	yúkʷɨ́lí	mə́l̰ə́	gʌ̍la̍	mɪ̄ɔ̄	nu̍ə̍
Eastern, Bete	Godié	wúlú	ɲɪ̄	yɨdí	ɲūkúlú	mə́l̰ə́	gə̄lè	mɪɔ̄	nə̄
Eastern, Bete	Koyo	wúlú	ɲɪ́ī	yɪ́yē	ɲūklwí	ŋʉ́ŋʉ́	glà	mɪ̄ɔ̄	nə́
Eastern, Bete	Néyo		ɲɪ́	yɪ́	ɲúkʷlí	mlé	glè	mɪ̄ɔ̄	né
Western, Klao	Klao	dlo᷄	nūi᷄	ji	nɔ̄kṵ̀	mna᷄		mɛ̄	wɔ̰̄
Western, Bassa	Bassa	dú	mí	dyéɖé	ɖùǔ	máná	nyɛ́nɛ́	mɔ	wɔ̰
Western, Bassa	Déwoin	dúlú		gire		málá̰		mīlà̰	wɔ̰̄ḭ́
Western, Grebo	Tépo	lú	lú púpu̍	yíe̍	nʊ̍a̍	mɪ̍yá̰	ɲɛ́	mɛ̍ ~ mé; mé ~ mɛ̍	wṵ̍t
Western, Grebo	Grébo	lu᷄		ye̍	nóá	méá		mɛ̄	ŋwúnɔ̄
Western, Grebo	Oubi		mi	yīrō	nōā	mēā̰			ŋu
Western, Grebo	Jrwe	lé	lé ɲà̰ɛ̰̍	jró	nʊ̰̍a̰̍	mɪ̰̍a̰̍	ɲɛ̰́	mɛ̰̍	wṵ́
Western, Wee	Guéré	drú	míī	jrííē	dōṵ́	ɓʊ̄	djūlɛ̀	mɛ̰̄ò̰	ŋɔ̰̄
Western, Wee	Nyabwa	dru̍	nɪ́mə̀ǹè	yíɾi̍	lòku̍	mə́ná	ɲéné	méɛ̰̀	ŋwɔ̰̄
Western, Wee	Wobé	jrú	mḛ́ḛ̄ ~ me; me ~ mḛ́ḛ̄	jríɛ́	dōṵ́	mla̰̍	ɲnḛ̍	mɛ̰̍ɔ̰̀	ŋwɔ̰̄
Western, Wee	Konobo	drɔ	mi	yidɔ	nao	mla̰		mɛ	

=== Body parts (lower) ===
Other body parts from Marchese (1983):

Classification	Language	neck	arm	breast	intestines	navel	leg	bone	blood	skin
Siamou	Seme	kʷa̰	bɔ	nʷḛ		ɲēfū		kpar	to̰	
Aizi	Aïzi	vu	sʊ	drɪ	mɪ	mʊkʊ	pɪ	kra	ɲre	kʊkɔ
Kuwaa	Kuwaa	fɛ̀lɛ		ɲàlì		sḭyà̰	bɔ̰̀	kʷa	to̍yò	kṵ᷆
Eastern, Bakwe	Bakwé (Soubré)	pli	dáɾó	ɲɪ̄tɪ̄	mī	mʊ̰̄kʷɛ̄	ɓɔō	kɔ̄ō	tùɾú	
Eastern, Dida	Dida (Lozoua)	brɪ̀ ~ bɾɪ̀; bɾɪ̀ ~ brɪ̀	sɔ̄	ɲētī	mɪ̄	mʊ́kʊ̄díè	ɓō	kwíyè	dòlū	kpʊ̄kpā
Eastern, Dida	Vata		sɔ̄		me̍	mókɔ̍lɛ̍	ɓɔ̄gʊ̀	fa̍	dūlū	fu̍
Eastern, Bete	Bété (Daloa)	blʊ̀	sɔ́	ɲɪ́tɪ́	wɪ̍	dàī	ɓʊ́	kwa̍	dɾú	
Eastern, Bete	Bété (Guibéroua)	bʊ̀lʊ́	sɔ̍	ɲɪ̄tɪ̄	mɪ́	dàyī	ɓʊ̍	kʷá	du̍ɾu̍	ku̍
Eastern, Bete	Godié	bʌlɛ̄	sɔ̄	ɲītì	mɪ́	dèè	ɓʉ̄	féè	dɾù	kpʊ̄kpʌ
Eastern, Bete	Koyo	blɛ̀	sɔ̄ɔ̄	ɲītīyē	mɪ́	mákɔ̄lʊ́gbā	ɓɔ̄ɔ́	féyē	dòlú	
Eastern, Bete	Néyo	blɛ̄	sɔ̄ɔ́		mɔ́gbàlɪ̄	ɲúkōlíé	ɓɔ̄ɔ́	féē	dòlū	kpʊ̄kpā
Western, Klao	Klao	pnu᷄	sʊ̰̄	ɲītī	mɔ̄ɛ᷄	pùtù	bʊ̄	kpa᷄	ɲnɔ̄	kū
Western, Bassa	Bassa	bùnù	sɔ̃	nɛɛ̀	mɛ́	zìì	ɓo	kpá	nyɔmɔɔ	ku
Western, Bassa	Déwoin	būnū		nḛ			ɓō	gba	ɲimo	
Western, Grebo	Tépo	plʊ̀	da̍bʊ́	nɛ̍yɛ̍ ~ ɲɛ̍yɛ̍; ɲɛ̍yɛ̍ ~ nɛ̍yɛ̍	ŋmí	nɛ́ɛ́ ~ nɛ́; nɛ́ ~ nɛ́ɛ́	bʊ̍	klá	da̍blʊ́	kɔ̀ ~ kɔ̍; kɔ̍ ~ kɔ̀
Western, Grebo	Grébo	plo᷄	só̰	ɲínē	kúdíde̍	no̍na᷄	bó	kla᷄	ɲénɔ́	kro|fe᷄{{lang|kro|
Western, Grebo	Oubi	pòlò	ho̰		muə̄gli	nə̰	bo	kala	dòùlā	
Western, Grebo	Jrwe	plʊ̀	hʊ̰̍	ɲɛ̰̍sɛ̍		nɛ̰́ɛ̰̍	bʊ̍	klá	klʊ́ʊ̍	kɔ̀
Western, Wee	Guéré	blṵ̄	sō̰	ɲḛ̄ɛ̰̀	mḛ̍	ɓóà	bʊ̍	kpa̍	ɲmɔ̰̄	kū
Western, Wee	Nyabwa	būlū	sʊ̄	ɲētìɛ̀	mé	zànɛ̍ɛ̍	ɓʊ̄	kpá	ɲēmō	kù
Western, Wee	Wobé	plṵ̀	sō̰	ɲḛ̄ɛ̰̀	mḛ̍	sɛ̰̀ ɲɛ̀	bʊ̄	kpa̍	nmɔ̄	kū
Western, Wee	Konobo		sʊ	ɲiniɛ		gbolo	bo	kla	daluo	

=== Other nouns ===
Miscellaneous nouns from Marchese (1983):

Classification	Language	snake	egg	horn	tail	rope	father	mother	woman	child	name
Siamou	Seme	jàl	kʸḛ	bī		ɲan	tɔ	yɔ	mel	ɓisyā	y̰i
Aizi	Aïzi	srɪ	ji	gbeli	gɛtɛ		zuzo	keke	lapɛ	jɪ	
Kuwaa	Kuwaa	gbɛ̰̀ɛ̰̀	kɛ̀ɛ̀mɛ̀	kṵ̌bé	ɲídewúlé	dòyò		nu	ɲinɔ̀	jí	ɲɛlɛ̰
Eastern, Bakwe	Bakwé (Soubré)	tɾɔ̄	sàpɨ́gē				tō	yuo	ŋʷɔ́l̰ɔ́	yəyie	ɲrɪ
Eastern, Dida	Dida (Lozoua)	trɛ̄	jīè	gwɪ́	gūò	ɓlū	to̍	nɔ́	ŋwnɔ́	cíle̍	ŋlɪ́
Eastern, Dida	Vata	tlɛ̄	gì ~ jì	vɔ́ɛ̍			co̍	nɔ́	ŋɔnɔ́	lo̍	
Eastern, Bete	Bété (Daloa)	tɪ́mɛ́	gʉyī	gɔ̍		li̍kpə́	tɓà	dà	ŋɔ́nɔ̍	gu̍	ŋʉ̍nɪ̍
Eastern, Bete	Bété (Guibéroua)	ti̍mɛ̍	gʉ̄	gʊ́	gʷə̀yi̍	díkpə̍	dɪ̄bà	dà	ŋɔ́ɾɔ́	yú	ŋʉ́l̰ɪ́
Eastern, Bete	Godié	trɛ̄	gɪ̀	vɪ̄	gə̀	ɓɨlɨ́kpə̄	tʉ́	dà	ŋʷɔ́l̰ɔ́	yɪ́	ŋʉ́nʉ́
Eastern, Bete	Koyo	miɛ̄bòlú	gɪ̀yē	gó		ɓlíyē	bá	nɔ́	ŋɔ́nɔ́	yó	ŋɨ́nɨ́
Eastern, Bete	Néyo	tlɛ̄	gè	vʊ́		ɓlú	tʊ́	nɛ́	ŋʷló̰	yʊ́	ylɪ́
Western, Klao	Klao	slɛ̄	ɲɛ᷆	ŋmo̰᷆	wʊ̰᷆	dlu᷄ ~ dbu᷄	mi᷄	dé	ɲnɔ᷄	jēgbé	ɲnɛ᷄
Western, Bassa	Bassa	sɛ	gɛ̃̀	gmɛ̌	vɔ̃	ɖúú	ɓà	ɖe	màa	dyú	ŋɛ́nɛ́
Western, Bassa	Déwoin	sɛ̄wɛ̄	ge			ɓùlū	ɓa̍	ma᷅	ɲiro; ŋɔ́nɔ́	wú	ŋɛ́lɛ́
Western, Grebo	Tépo	hre̍	ŋɔ̀	ŋmʊ̄	bà	pátà	bu̍	díí ~ dí; dí ~ díí	ɲnɔ̍gbá	yú	dʊ́
Western, Grebo	Grébo	sídé	ŋēyē			lúdu̍	bu̍o̍	de᷄	ɲénɛ́	hḛ̍a̰̍	ɲéné
Western, Grebo	Oubi	here	hawɛŋɨ̰nɛ	ŋʷɛ̰	ba	wūlū	bui	di	ɲīrō̰	yu	ɲíró̰
Western, Grebo	Jrwe	hre̍	ɲɔ̰́lò	do̍e̍	bà	lúrū	bó	dé	nɔ̰̍wá	yú	ɲl̰ɔ̰́
Western, Wee	Guéré	sɛ̰̄	sō̰a̰̍ gɛ̄	ŋm̄ɔ̰̍	gō̰	dbú	bā	do̍ū	jú zá̰à̰	ɓāò	ɲnɪ̰̍
Western, Wee	Nyabwa	sɛ̰̄	sò̰o̰̍ gḛ̄ɛ̰̄	gbó̰	gō̰	ɓlu̍kū	tèta	lótō	ɲə́nɔ́	yu̍	ɲéné
Western, Wee	Wobé	sɛ̰̄	so̰᷄kɛ̰̀ɛ̰̀	ŋmɛ̀	ko̰᷅	dbū ~ dbú; dbú ~ dbū	bó	dē	ɲnɔ̍ kpāo̍	jú sǎ̰ā̰	ɲnḛ̍
Western, Wee	Konobo	sɛrɛ	ɲie	gbo	gʷo	dru	ba	de	ɲɪnɪ	jowe	ɲi

=== Nature ===
Nature-related words from Marchese (1983):

Classification	Language	day	sun	moon	water	fire	fog	sea	dust	salt
Siamou	Seme	yefʸɛ	ye	fʷǒ	nṵ	niɛ				
Aizi	Aïzi	zi	ze	cu	nrɪ	lede	jru	magri	ɓʊɓʊ	trʊ
Kuwaa	Kuwaa	kùlù	kàlà	kewu	nímí	ka̰᷆	koo	jiwo	lowo	kìyɔ̀
Eastern, Bakwe	Bakwé (Soubré)	srè	jró	sɨple	nē	kāpū	bru	tánīē	mɔ̰l̰ɔ̰	
Eastern, Dida	Dida (Lozoua)	cɾɪ̄	ylʊ́	cʊ́	ɲú	kòsū	jlū	jḭ̄yē	pipi	glī
Eastern, Dida	Vata			cʊ̍	ɲú	kōsū		jɛ̰́vie̍	ŋúŋu̍	
Eastern, Bete	Bété (Daloa)	yɪ̍ɾɪ̍	yʊ̍ɾʊ̍zàrʊ́	na̍pɛ́	ɲu̍	kòsū	gbi̍ɾu̍	gɨ-ɲɛ̄	ɓu̍kú	gʉ́ɓɨ́
Eastern, Bete	Bété (Guibéroua)	yɪ́ɾɪ́	yʊ́ɾʊ́	cʊ́	ɲú	kòsū	ju̍ɾu̍	jīē	ɓūù-kʷə̍	gɨ̍ɓɨ̍
Eastern, Bete	Godié	yʊ̀ɾʊ̀	yʊɾʊ́	cʊ̄	ɲú	kòsū	jùɾù	jīyē	ɓàɓùū	gɨ̀ɗɨ̀
Eastern, Bete	Koyo	yʊ́rʊ́	yʊ́rʊ́	cʊ́ʊ̄	ɲú	kòsū	jùrù	jīyē	ɓūɓú	gʉ̀lʉ̀
Eastern, Bete	Néyo	zlì	ylʊ́	cʊ́	ɲú	kōsū	jlù	gɨ̄ē	mʊ̍mʷɪ̄ɪ́	gūu̍
Western, Klao	Klao		ylʊ᷄	cʊ̄	ni᷄	nɛ	jlu᷄	jlō	pūpūí	to̰᷄
Western, Bassa	Bassa	wé	dyóɖó	dɛ̀nɛ̀	ní	nyɛ	dunu	dyóó	púu	tɔ̃́
Western, Bassa	Déwoin	wé	gú	sò	ní	nàì				tó̰
Western, Grebo	Tépo	ɲnɔ̀wo̍	yrʊ́	hɔ̀pɔ̍	ni̍yḛ́	na̍	jrù	yrú	púpu̍	tá
Western, Grebo	Grébo		ŋwɛ́	hɔ̀bō	ni᷄	ná	jūdú	yúdá	púíbi̍	ta᷄
Western, Grebo	Oubi	ɲìrò̰	jīrō	hɔ̰liɛ	ɲɛ́	nàní	jùrù	tápɛ̀	múlɔ̰̀	
Western, Grebo	Jrwe|	ɲl̰ɔ̰̀wò	jrʊ́	hóóò	nḭ́ḛ́	na̰̍	jrù	ti̍e̍	púwò	tá
Western, Wee	Guéré	wɪ̍	jru̍	cʊ̍	ní	nɛ̰̄	wɛ̍ì	to̰̍nī	djɛ̄ɛ̀	tɔ̰̍
Western, Wee	Nyabwa	wɪ́	yóró	cʊ́	ni̍	nɛ̄	jurū	gɨ̄ɨ̄	pīpèlè	tɔ̰̄
Western, Wee	Wobé	wɪ̍	jru̍	cʊ̍	nḭ́	nɛ̰̄	cnṵ̄	to̰̍nī	pu̍ē	tɔ̰̍
Western, Wee	Konobo	wɔ̰	jɨdo	co	ɲɛ	nani	jlu	yoo	mulo	ta

=== Verbs (1) ===
Some basic verbs from Marchese (1983):

Classification	Language	eat	drink	bite	vomit	die	kill	walk	come
Siamou	Seme	di	namu	nuo̰		ko(klo)	ko(kɔrɔ)	koel	bɛ(bla)
Aizi	Aïzi	li	ma	cɛ	gʷra	kɔ	yra	na	yi
Kuwaa	Kuwaa	jì	gbɛ	ɲìmì	kɔ̀jɛ̀	fa̰la̰	java	namu	yì
Eastern, Bakwe	Bakwé (Soubré)	jɨ	ml̰áà	ml̰u	wɔsɔ	jʌ	ɓlá	ɲɛ́	jī
Eastern, Dida	Dida (Lozoua)	ti̍	mlá	mni̍	gɔ̍zɛ̄	kú	ɓlá	námʊ̍	ci̍
Eastern, Dida	Vata	li̍	nia̍	nlɪ̍	ɓeɔ̀	fú		nánɪ́	yi̍
Eastern, Bete	Bété (Daloa)	lī	nɪ̍ma̍	nɨ́mɨ́	mə́tī	tɾɪ	lɪ̍ɓa̍	námʉ́	jí
Eastern, Bete	Bété (Guibéroua)	dī	nɪ́mʌ́	nīmɨ̄	mə́tī	kú	lɪ́bʌ́	nɛ̍mʉ̍	yī
Eastern, Bete	Godié	ɗɨ̄	mʌ́nʌ́	mɨ̄l̰ɨ̄	gʷʌ̄sɛ̀	kú	ɓʌ́lʌ́	nʌ́ʌ̄	yī
Eastern, Bete	Koyo	lɨ̄	ḿlá	miɨ̄	gɔ̄sɛ̀	kú	ɓlá	ná̰à̰	yī
Eastern, Bete	Néyo	lī	mlá	miī	gɔ̄zɪ̀ɔ̀	kú	ɓla̍	nāà	yī
Western, Klao	Klao	dī	na᷄	nmī	wlà	mɛ᷄	dla᷄ ~ dba᷄	na᷆	jí
Western, Bassa	Bassa	ɖi	ná	numu	hwaɖa	mɛ́	ɖáɓá	nà	dyi
Western, Bassa	Déwoin	zī	ná			ku	ta̰; láwá		yi
Western, Grebo	Tépo	di̍	ná	ne̍	wlà	kʊ́	lá ~ la̍; la̍ ~ lá	nà	di̍ré
Western, Grebo	Grébo	dí	na᷄	mlí	wōdá	kō(ɛ́)			dí
Western, Grebo	Oubi	dīdɛ̄	ná		wɔ̀là	kʊ	wɔlɔ	na	dó
Western, Grebo	Jrwe	di̍dɛ̍	ná̰	nɛ̰́ɛ̰̍	wlà		la̍	na̰̍	di̍rè
Western, Wee	Guéré	djréè	na̍	nmū	gwlà	ɗrē	dbā	na̰᷆	jī
Western, Wee	Nyabwa	dī	ná	nūmū	gəlāgəlá		lə́ɓá	nà	yī
Western, Wee	Wobé	dī	na̍	nmū	kẁlā	mɛ̍	dba̍	na᷆	jī
Western, Wee	Konobo	di	na	wlaawɔ	gula	mɛ	dra	na	jlo

=== Verbs (2) ===
Other basic verbs from Marchese (1983):

Classification	Language	give	dig	sleep	push	shoot	sing
Siamou	Seme	kḛ; kla̰		dɛ; la	tutur		gʸai ɲḛ
Aizi	Aïzi	ɲɛ	ɓru	mɔ namʊ	tu	gbi	
Kuwaa	Kuwaa	nì	bíí	wa̰ni	to᷆	kòì	fa᷆doyo
Eastern, Bakwe	Bakwé (Soubré)	ɲe		múmɔ̀		kʷɛ́ɛ̀	
Eastern, Dida	Dida (Lozoua)	ɲɛ́	ɓlí	ŋɔ̄mʊ̄	sú	jri̍ ~ jɾi̍	ɓlɪ̄
Eastern, Dida	Vata		ɓlí	ɲɔ́nɔ̍	súsue̍		ɓlɪ̍
Eastern, Bete	Bété (Daloa)	ɲɛ̍	wlù	ŋɔ́mʉ́	súnʊ̄	tɪ̍tɾɪ́	blɪ̄
Eastern, Bete	Bété (Guibéroua)|	ɲɛ́	ɓúlú	ŋʌ̍mʉ̍	súnɪ̄	jiɾi ~ jīɾi	ɓʉ̄lɪ̄
Eastern, Bete	Godié	ɲɛ́	ɓɨ́dɨ́	ŋʷɔ́ɔ̄	sú	jri	ɓʉ̄lɪ̄
Eastern, Bete	Koyo	ɲɛ́	ɓlʉ́lʉ́	ŋɔ́ɔ̀	zɛ́	jrɨ̄	ɓlɪ̄
Eastern, Bete	Néyo	ɲɛ́	wlúū	ŋɔ̄	sú	jri ~ jrī	ɓlɪ̄
Western, Klao	Klao	ɲî	blu᷄		tṵ᷄	jlì	blē
Western, Bassa	Bassa	nyí	ɓúɖú	mɔ́ ; nyíɔ	cṹ	pòìn	ɓeɖe
Western, Bassa	Déwoin	gḭ́	ɓúlú	nɔ́	sṵ́	gbī	ɓēlē
Western, Grebo	Tépo	ɲè	gblú	ŋmò	túe̍		bre̍
Western, Grebo	Grébo	hḭ᷄	búdú	móɔ́	tṵ̄		blé
Western, Grebo	Oubi	ɲé	búlúiro	ŋmo̰	tūɛ̄	gìrɛ̀lɔ́	bəlɛ
Western, Grebo	Jrwe	ɲɛ̰̀	blú	ŋmḛ̍	tú		bre̍wlà
Western, Wee	Guéré	jé	ɓlú	mo̰̍	tṵ́		ble̍
Western, Wee	Nyabwa	ɲe̍m	bulu̍	mó̰	tūù	jīrī	ɓlē
Western, Wee	Wobé	ɲḛ̍	blú	mo̰̍	pō	crḭḭa̍ ~ crīīa̍	ble̍
Western, Wee	Konobo	ye	blo	mo	tui	jidiɛ	ble

== Reconstruction ==
Proto-Kru
- Reconstruction of: Kru languages

According to Marchese Zogbo (2012), Proto-Kru had:

- phonemic nasalized vowels
- four level tones
- *CVCV-(C)V and probably *CVV syllable structure. *CCV syllables, and possibly also *CVV syllables, are derived from *CVCV roots.
- SVO word order, but with much OV typology
- suffixing morphology
- perfective and imperfective aspects

Proto-Kru consonants (Marchese Zogbo 2012):

p	t	k	kp
b	d	g	gb
ɓ			
m	n	ŋ (?)	
	s		
	l	w	

Derived consonants:

- /ɟ/ is likely derived via palatalization (*g > ɟ), e.g. *gie > ɟie.
- *c, *ɲ, *kʷ, *gʷ, *ŋʷ are derived from alveolar or velar consonants preceding high back or high front vowels.
- /ɗ/ is likely derived from *l.

Proto-Kru vowels (Marchese Zogbo 2012):

ɪ	ʊ
e	o
ɛ	ɔ
a	

There is a clear bipartite division between Western and Eastern Kru marked by phonological and lexical distinctions. Some isoglosses between Western Kru and Eastern Kru:

Gloss	Proto-Western Kru	Proto-Eastern Kru
tree	*tu	*su
dog	*gbe	*gwɪ
fire	*nɛ	*kosu
tooth	*ɲnɪ	*gle
