= Voiced labial–velar plosive =

Consonantal sound

ɡ͡b
- IPA number: 110 (102)

Audio sample
- source · help

Encoding
- Entity (decimal): &#609;&#865;&#98;
- Unicode (hex): U+0261 U+0361 U+0062
Image

A voiced labial–velar plosive is a type of consonantal sound, used in some spoken languages. It is a [ɡ] and [b] pronounced simultaneously and is considered a double articulation. To make this sound, one can say go but with the lips closed as if one were saying Bo; the lips are to be released at the same time as or a fraction of a second after the g of go is pronounced. The symbol in the International Phonetic Alphabet that represents this sound is ⟨ɡ͡b⟩. Its voiceless counterpart is voiceless labial–velar plosive, [k͡p].

A voiced labial–velar plosive is commonly found in Niger-Congo languages, e.g. in Igbo (Volta-Congo) in the name [iɡ͡boː] itself; or in Bété (Atlantic-Congo), e.g. in the surname of Laurent Gbagbo [ɡ͡baɡ͡bo], former president of Ivory Coast.

== Features ==
Features of a voiced labial–velar stop:

- Its manner of articulation is occlusive, which means it is produced by obstructing airflow in the vocal tract. Since the consonant is also oral, with no nasal outlet, it is a plosive.
- Its place of articulation is labial–velar, which means it is simultaneously articulated with the lips and with the back part of the tongue (the dorsum) against the soft palate (the velum). The dorsal closure is made and released slightly before the labial closure, but they overlap for most of their duration.
- Its phonation is voiced, which means the vocal cords vibrate during the articulation.
- It is an oral consonant, which means that air is not allowed to escape through the nose.
- It is a median consonant, which means it is produced by directing the airstream down the midline of the tongue, rather than to the sides.
- Its airstream mechanism is pulmonic, which means it is articulated by pushing air only with the intercostal muscles and abdominal muscles, as in most speech sounds.

== Occurrence ==
=== Plain variant ===
Language	Word	IPA	Meaning	Notes
Ega	[ɡ͡bá]		'finish'	
Ewe	Èʋegbe	[èβeɡ͡be]	'Ewe language'	
Igbo	Igbo	[iɡ͡boː]	'Igbo'	
Kalabari	ágbá	[áɡ͡bá]	'paint'	
Kissi	gbɛŋgbo	[ɡ͡bɛŋɡ͡bɔ]	'stool'	
Mono (Ubangian)	gba	[ɡ͡ba]	'moisten'	
Mundang	gbajole / ࢥَجٝلٜ	[ɡ͡baɟole]	'to help'	
Nen	ḡéb	[ɡ͡bɪb]	'shadow; shade'	The language has [ɡ͡b ᵑ͡ᵐɡ͡b k͡p].
Nigerian Pidgin	gbedu	[ɡ͡bɛdu]	'beats' (of music)	Phonemic. Found in substrate words and later loanwords from native Nigerian languages. See Languages of Nigeria.
Tarok	igban	[iɡ͡ban]	'traditional wooden tool'	
Temne	kʌgbara	[kʌɡ͡bara]	'coconut'	
Tyap	a̠mgba̠m	[əmɡ͡bəm]	'all'	
Yoruba	gbogbo	[ɡ͡boɡ͡bo]	'all'	

=== Other variants ===
Language	Word	IPA	Meaning	Notes
Nen	dénḡ	[dɪᵑ͡ᵐɡ͡b]	'old-style bamboo pipe or container'	The language has [ɡ͡b ᵑ͡ᵐɡ͡b k͡p].
Volow	nleq̄evēn	[n.lɛᵑᵐɡ͡bʷɛβɪn]	'woman'	with labiovelar release

== See also ==
- List of phonetics topics
- Doubly articulated consonant
- Co-articulated consonant

== Notes ==
Place →	Labial					Coronal										Dorsal					Laryngeal			
Manner ↓	Bilabial		Labiodental		Linguolabial		Dental		Alveolar		Postalveolar		Retroflex		(Alveolo-)palatal		Velar		Uvular		Pharyngeal/epiglottal		Glottal	
Nasal	m̥	m	ɱ̊	ɱ		n̼	n̪̊	n̪	n̥	n	n̠̊	n̠	ɳ̊	ɳ	ɲ̊	ɲ	ŋ̊	ŋ	ɴ̥	ɴ				
Plosive	p	b	p̪	b̪	t̼	d̼	t̪	d̪	t	d			ʈ	ɖ	c	ɟ	k	ɡ	q	ɢ	ʡ		ʔ	
Sibilant affricate							t̪s̪	d̪z̪	ts	dz	t̠ʃ	d̠ʒ	tʂ	dʐ	tɕ	dʑ								
Non-sibilant affricate	pɸ	bβ	p̪f	b̪v			t̪θ	d̪ð	tɹ̝̊	dɹ̝	t̠ɹ̠̊˔	d̠ɹ̠˔			cç	ɟʝ	kx	ɡɣ	qχ	ɢʁ	ʡʜ	ʡʢ	ʔh	
Sibilant fricative							s̪	z̪	s	z	ʃ	ʒ	ʂ	ʐ	ɕ	ʑ								
Non-sibilant fricative	ɸ	β	f	v	θ̼	ð̼	θ	ð	θ̠	ð̠	ɹ̠̊˔	ɹ̠˔	ɻ̊˔	ɻ˔	ç	ʝ	x	ɣ	χ	ʁ	ħ	ʕ	h	ɦ
Approximant		β̞		ʋ				ð̞		ɹ		ɹ̠		ɻ		j		ɰ						˷
Tap/flap		ⱱ̟		ⱱ					ɾ̥	ɾ			ɽ̊	ɽ						ɢ̆		ʡ̆		
Trill	ʙ̥	ʙ							r̥	r		r̠	ɽ̊r̥	ɽr					ʀ̥	ʀ	ʜ	ʢ		
Lateral affricate									tɬ	dɮ			tꞎ	d𝼅	c𝼆	ɟʎ̝	k𝼄	ɡʟ̝						
Lateral fricative							ɬ̪		ɬ	ɮ			ꞎ	𝼅	𝼆	ʎ̝	𝼄	ʟ̝						
Lateral approximant								l̪	l̥	l		l̠	ɭ̊	ɭ	ʎ̥	ʎ	ʟ̥	ʟ		ʟ̠				
Lateral tap/flap									ɺ̥	ɺ			𝼈̊	𝼈		ʎ̆		ʟ̆						

		BL	LD	D	A	PA	RF	P	V	U
Implosive	Voiced	ɓ			ɗ		ᶑ	ʄ	ɠ	ʛ
Implosive	Voiceless	ɓ̥			ɗ̥		ᶑ̊	ʄ̊	ɠ̊	ʛ̥
Ejective	Stop	pʼ			tʼ		ʈʼ	cʼ	kʼ	qʼ
Ejective	Affricate		p̪fʼ	tθʼ	tsʼ	tʃʼ	tʂʼ	tɕʼ	kxʼ	qχʼ
Ejective	Fricative	ɸʼ	fʼ	θʼ	sʼ	ʃʼ	ʂʼ	ɕʼ	xʼ	χʼ
Ejective	Lateral affricate				tɬʼ			c𝼆ʼ	k𝼄ʼ	q𝼄ʼ
Ejective	Lateral fricative				ɬʼ					
Click (top: velar; bottom: uvular)	Tenuis	kʘ qʘ		kǀ qǀ	kǃ qǃ		k𝼊 q𝼊	kǂ qǂ		
Click (top: velar; bottom: uvular)	Voiced	ɡʘ ɢʘ		ɡǀ ɢǀ	ɡǃ ɢǃ		ɡ𝼊 ɢ𝼊	ɡǂ ɢǂ		
Click (top: velar; bottom: uvular)	Nasal	ŋʘ ɴʘ		ŋǀ ɴǀ	ŋǃ ɴǃ		ŋ𝼊 ɴ𝼊	ŋǂ ɴǂ	ʞ	
Click (top: velar; bottom: uvular)	Tenuis lateral				kǁ qǁ					
Click (top: velar; bottom: uvular)	Voiced lateral				ɡǁ ɢǁ					
Click (top: velar; bottom: uvular)	Nasal lateral				ŋǁ ɴǁ					
