= Jabo =

Jabo may refer to:

- Jabo people, an ethnic group in Liberia
- Jabo language, in Liberia
- Jabo (Nigeria), a village in Niger State
- Jabo, a village in Sokoto State
- An abbreviation for the German term Jagdbomber for fighter-bomber aircraft

== People with the given name or nickname ==
- Jabo Ibehre (born 1983), British footballer
- Harvey "Jabo" Jablonsky (1909–1989), US Army major general and College Hall of Fame football player
- John "Jabo" Starks (1938–2018), American musician
- J. T. "Jabo" Waggoner (born 1937), American politician
- Jabo Williams (c. 1885–1953 or 1954), American musician

== See also ==
- Jabbo, a nickname
