= Alexander Alderman Semmes =

United States Navy officer (1825–1885)

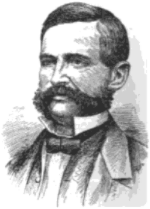
- Born: January 18, 1825; Washington, D.C.
- Died: September 22, 1885 (aged 60) Hamilton, Virginia
- Allegiance: United States; Union
- Branch: United States Navy; Union Navy
- Service years: October 27, 1841 – June 1883
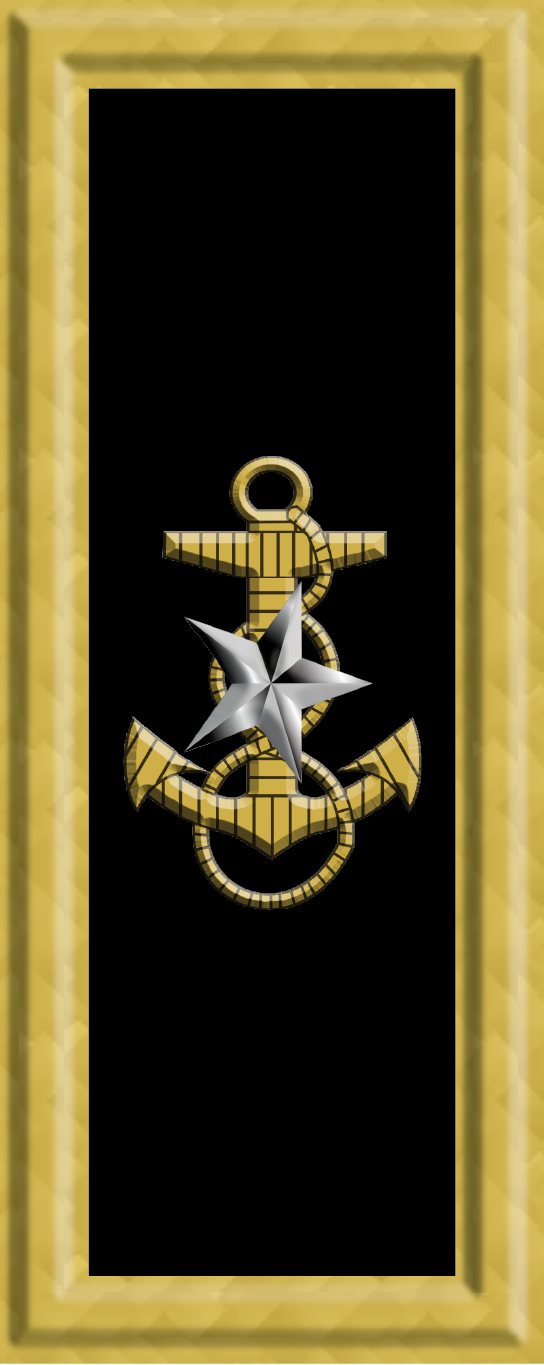
- Rank: Commodore
- Commands: USS Wamsutta; USS Tahoma; USS Lehigh; USS Alaska
- Conflicts: American Civil War: Battle of the Riceboro River; Liberian–Grebo War
- Other work: Third president of the Board of Inspection and Survey, 1880–1883

Alexander Alderman Semmes (January 18, 1825 – September 22, 1885) was a career United States Navy officer, who served with distinction in the American Civil War. He was a cousin of Confederate naval hero Raphael Semmes, and also of Confederate general Paul Jones Semmes.

== Early life ==
Alexander Alderman Semmes was born in Washington, D.C., on January 18, 1825.

== Naval career ==
Semmes became a midshipman on October 27, 1841. He attended the United States Naval Academy and became a passed midshipman on August 10, 1847. He was promoted to master on September 14, 1855, and to lieutenant the next day, September 15, 1855. He became a lieutenant commander on July 16, 1862, and commander on July 25, 1866. He attained the rank of captain on August 24, 1873, and was promoted to commodore on March 10, 1882.

== Civil War service ==
Semmes served on the side-wheel steamship Rhode Island as a lieutenant during the first year of the war, during which time the vessel captured the Confederate schooner Aristides off Charlotte harbor. In March 1862, he was given command of the screw steamer Wamsutta, and participated in the Battle of the Riceboro River.

Semmes was promoted to lieutenant commander in July, and given command of the new screw propeller gunboat Tahoma on October 17, 1862. Serving in the East Gulf Blockade Squadron commanded by Admiral Cornelius Stribling, he was able to make seven captures off the west coast of Florida, as well as launching an expeditionary attack at Tampa Bay and engaging the shore batteries at Gadsden Point in April 1863.

In August 1864, he became commander of the Passaic-class monitor Lehigh, participating in the bombardment of Fort Pringle, and in the operations at Charleston until that city surrendered. He co-operated with Gen. U.S. Grant's army, fought the Howlett's House batteries, and was present at the fall of Richmond in 1865.

== Postwar service ==
Semmes was made captain of the sloop of war USS Alaska, and in around December 1875 was ordered by President Grant to Cape Palmas, Liberia, in a show of force to stop the Liberian–Grebo War. Semmes pulled into Cape Palmas on 3 February 1876.

In 1880, Semmes was made the third president of the Board of Inspection and Survey, which had been formed in 1868. He served as the board's president until June 1883. At the time of his death, he commanded the Washington Navy Yard.

== Personal life ==
Semmes married Mary Dorsey of Baltimore, Maryland, in 1864. He died in Hamilton, Virginia, in 1885 at the age of 60.
