= 1951 Liberian general election =

- Presidential election
- 1 May 1951
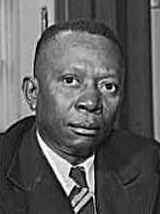
Nominee	William Tubman
Party	TWP
President before election
William Tubman
TWP
Elected President
William Tubman
TWP

General elections were held in Liberia on 1 May 1951, the first to be held under universal suffrage; previously only male descendants of Americo-Liberians had been allowed to vote. This was the first elections in Liberia where women and the local Liberians owning property were allowed to vote based on constitutional referendums in 1945 and 1946. In the presidential election, William Tubman of the True Whig Party was the only candidate, and was re-elected unopposed.

Prior to 1951, elections had been held in May and ballots were counted during the Legislative meeting during November or December, with the winning President and representatives taking their oaths the following January. The ballot papers were burnt in the interim. A new law was implemented which scrapped this practice and retained ballot papers until all the challenging parties of the results were satisfied.

Tubman was elected unopposed for a third term in succession and took oath in January 1952. William Richard Tolbert Jr., who was his running mate in the elections became vice president for the first time.

== Electoral system ==
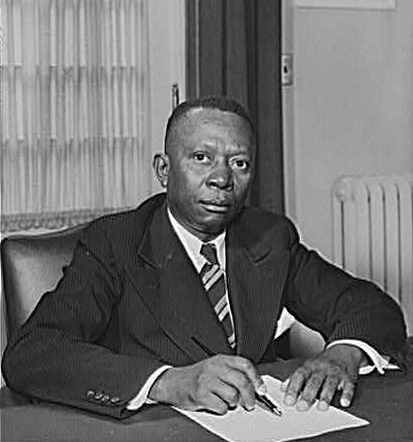
William Tubman, the incumbent and winning President of 1951 elections

The Legislature of Liberia was modeled based on the Legislature of United States. It is bicameral in nature with a Senate and the House of Representatives. There are 15 counties in the country and based on the population, each county is defined to have at least two members, while the total number of members to the house including the Speaker being 64. Each member represents an electoral district and elected to a four-year term based on popular vote. There were 18 senators, two each for the nine counties who served a six-year term. Senators were also elected based on plurality of votes.

The franchise was widened to allow women and Liberians owning property to vote based following constitutional referendums in 1945 and 1946.

== Candidates ==
Incumbent President William Tubman had been in power since 1947.

Didwho Welleh Twe emerged as an opposition to challenge the Presidency of Tubman and postulated that it was the responsibility of the United States of America to conduct free and fair elections in Liberia. He was disqualified on charges of sedition subsequently. Tubman canvassed with a theme of anti-communism and announced in an election rally that "it might be well that they endeavor to work out their own salvation and with fear and trembling". The Speaker of the House also drew examples from the US on the need to suppress Communism.

== Results ==
Tubman was elected unopposed for a third term in succession and took oath in January 1952. William Richard Tolbert Jr., who was his running mate in the elections became vice president for the first time.
