= GRJ =

GRJ may refer to:

- George Airport, an airport in George, South Africa
- Gradshteyn and Ryzhik (and Jeffrey) a.k.a. Table of Integrals, Series, and Products, a classical book in mathematics
- Jabo language, by ISO-639 code
