= Edward Barrett (Medal of Honor) =

US Navy sailor (born 1855)

- Born: 1855; Philadelphia, Pennsylvania, US
- Died: Unknown
- Military career
- Allegiance: United States of America
- Branch: United States Navy
- Rank: Second Class Fireman
- Unit: USS Alaska (1868)
- Awards: Medal of Honor

Edward Barrett (born 1855) was an American second class fireman serving in the United States Navy who received the Medal of Honor for bravery.

== Biography ==
Barrett was born in 1855 in Philadelphia, Pennsylvania and after joining the navy was stationed aboard the USS Alaska (1868) as a second class fireman. On September 14, 1881, the USS Alaska was in Callao Bay, Peru when a chamber in the ship's boiler ruptured. Flames began erupting from beneath the boilers and Barrett began working to extinguish the fires. Eventually the fires where extinguished and the boiler was repaired. For his actions during the fire he received the Medal October 18, 1884.

== Medal of Honor citation ==
Rank and organization: Second Class Fireman, U.S. Navy. Born: 1855, Philadelphia, Pa. Accredited to: Pennsylvania. G.O. No.: 326, 18 October 1884.

Citation:

On board the U.S.S. Alaska at Callao Bay, Peru, 14 September 1881. Following the rupture of the stop-valve chamber, Barrett courageously hauled the fires from under the boiler of that vessel.

== See also ==
- List of Medal of Honor recipients in non-combat incidents
