= Jabbo =

Jabbo is a nickname. People with the name include:

- Jabbo Andrews (1907–1964), American baseball player
- Jasper "Jabbo" Phillips, lead singer of American soul vocal trio The Temprees
- Jabbo Smith (1908–1991), American jazz musician

== See also ==
- Jabo § People with the given name or nickname
