= USS Alaska (1868) =

Sloops-of-war of the United States Navy

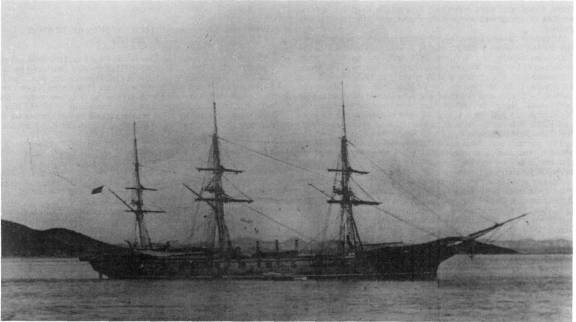
- USS Alaska during the expedition to Korea, 1871

History

United States
- Name: USS Alaska
- Namesake: Alaska Territory
- Builder: Charlestown Navy Yard
- Laid down: 22 August 1867
- Launched: 31 October 1868
- Commissioned: 8 December 1869
- Decommissioned: 5 October 1876
- Recommissioned: 23 April 1878
- Decommissioned: 13 February 1883
- Fate: Sold, 20 November 1883

General characteristics
- Type: Sloop-of-war
- Displacement: 2,394 tons
- Length: 250 ft 6 in (76.35 m)
- Beam: 38 ft (12 m)
- Draft: 16 ft (4.9 m)
- Speed: 11.5 knots (21.3 km/h; 13.2 mph)
- Complement: 273
- Armament: 1 × 11 in (280 mm) smoothbore; 10 × 9 in (230 mm) guns; 1 × 60-pounder; 2 × 20-pounders

Service record
- Commanders: Homer C. Blake (1869–73); Alexander A. Semmes (1873–76); George Brown (1878–81); George Belknap (1881–83)
- Operations: Battle of Ganghwa, 1871

The first USS Alaska was a wooden-hulled screw sloop of war, built at the Boston Navy Yard and named for the then-newly acquired territory. The ship was launched on 31 October 1868 and sponsored by Miss Grace Hull, the daughter of Mayor Liverus Hull of Charlestown, Boston. Alaska was commissioned on 8 December 1869, with Commander Homer C. Blake in command.

== Service history ==
=== Asiatic Squadron, 1870–1872 ===
On 9 April 1870, Alaska got underway from New York in company with Rear Admiral John Rodger's flagship, the screw frigate Colorado. However, the two warships soon parted company; and Alaska steamed independently to the Far East where she visited many of the more important ports to show the flag until May 1871. At that time, Alaska joined four other ships of the Asiatic Squadron in a visit to Korea in order to secure a treaty to open the "Hermit Kingdom" to the west. The five ships departed Nagasaki, Japan, on 16 May 1871 and arrived at Roze Roads near the mouth of the Salee River on the 24th. Due to her deep draft, Alaska herself was unable to ascend the river. Nevertheless, her commanding officer was placed in charge of the surveying expedition—consisting of Palos, Monocacy, and some steam launches from the larger ships—which ascended the river.

When the American vessels drew fire from a trio of Korean forts, Rear Admiral John Rodgers decided upon a punitive action to capture and destroy the forts in reprisal. In the Battle of Ganghwa Alaska's captain took command of the enterprise which was made up of 769 sailors and marines, seven 12-pounder howitzers, four stern launches, and numerous boats. Palos and Monocacy provided the distant, heavy support. The force, after initial difficulty getting ashore across tidal mudflats, quickly occupied the first of the three forts—abandoned by its garrison—and consolidated its beachhead in preparation for the assault on the remaining forts the following day. On that morning—thanks to Monocacy's, heavy ordnance—the second fort fell just as easily as the first had done. Palos had been damaged by an uncharted rock the previous evening and had to be withdrawn from the action.

The main fort, however, had to be taken by storm and hand-to-hand combat. Discipline and modern weapons triumphed over greatly superior numbers and, by the end of the day on the 11th, all three Korean forts belonged to the Americans.

During the final assault Marine Private Hugh Purvis of Alaska was the first to scale the walls of the fort, and with Corporal Charles Brown of Colorado, captured the Sujagi (personal flag) of the Korean commanding General Eo Jae-yeon. Both men subsequently received the Medal of Honor. No less than fifteen Medals of Honor were awarded during the three-day conflict.

The next day, officers and men of the landing force re-embarked in their ships to await the Korean government's response to the punitive expedition. By 3 July, it became apparent that the Korean government would make no official response to the action and that the desired treaty was not in the offing. Accordingly, Alaska and her consorts got underway to resume their duties on the Asiatic station. That duty continued until 28 October 1872 when the steamer departed Hong Kong, bound for New York.

=== European Squadron, 1873–1876 ===
Alaska spent the first seven months of 1873 undergoing repairs at New York, before putting to sea on 28 August for duty with the European Squadron, under the command of Alexander Alderman Semmes. She arrived at Cádiz, Spain, on 25 September, but remained on station only a little over two months.

Long restive under Spanish rule, separatist factions in Cuba had begun fighting for freedom. In 1870, the rebels had acquired the American sidewheel steamship Virginius to carry irregular troops and supplies. Late in October 1873, the Spanish man-of-war Tornado captured the insurgent transport on the high seas and took her to Santiago, where passengers and crew were arrested. Speedily tried by court-martial, most of the prisoners were condemned to death; and, between 4 and 13 November 53 were executed—of whom eight were American citizens, including the transport's master, Capt. Joseph Fry.

The United States consul at Santiago cabled reports of this tragic development, requesting the protection of United States warships to protect American lives. Anger at this wanton slaughter flared throughout the United States, and Secretary of the Navy George M. Robeson ordered the European and South Atlantic Squadrons to join the Home Squadron at Key West, Florida, to prepare for the outbreak of war which appeared to be imminent.

On 30 November, Alaska and the rest of the European Squadron sailed for Key West where she and her sisters three squadrons were combined in a single fleet for several months of operations supporting diplomatic efforts to obtain redress.

After negotiations freed the remaining prisoners and indemnities for the families were arranged, Alaska headed back to the European Station on 9 April 1874 and, for most of what remained of the year, visited ports along the shores of the Mediterranean Sea. Either late in 1874 or early in 1875, she put into La Spezia, Italy, for repairs. On 10 May 1875, the warship departed La Spezia and resumed her schedule of Mediterranean port visits. Near the end of May, however, she exited the Mediterranean Sea for a circuit of calls at northern European and Baltic Sea ports. Alaska completed that cruise and reentered the Mediterranean Sea on 19 September.

In December 1875, Alaska was ordered by Ulysses S. Grant to Cape Palmas in Maryland County, Liberia, for a show of force to stop the Liberian–Grebo War. The Alaska arrived at Cape Palmas on 3 February 1876. Liberia was in practice an American colony, and U.S. envoy James Milton Turner, the first African-American ambassador, requested a warship to protect American property in Liberia. Turner, bolstered by U.S. naval presence in harbor and the support of the USS Alaska's captain, negotiated the incorporation of Grebo people into Liberian society and the ousting of foreign traders from Liberia.

The warship continued operations in the Mediterranean for about a year and then returned to the United States early in October 1876. She was decommissioned at New York on 5 October 1876 for extended repairs.

=== Pacific Squadron, 1878–1883 ===
Alaska was placed back in commission on 23 April 1878 and put to sea from New York on 14 June, bound for the Pacific, under the command of George Brown. After rounding Cape Horn late in the summer of 1878, she called at Callao, Peru, on the 23rd. Following visits to several other Latin American ports, Alaska arrived in San Francisco on 11 March 1879. On the 22nd, she got underway for Sitka, Alaska where Indian unrest endangered the lives and property of American citizens. She arrived at Sitka on 3 April, and—except for a voyage to Victoria, British Columbia, late in April—she served there until 16 June. The warship returned to San Francisco on 24 June and remained there until 12 August when she began a series of visits to ports along the west coasts of Central and South America.

That employment carried her into 1880. On 22 July 1880, Alaska departed Chimbote, Peru, and headed for the South Pacific. On the outward-bound voyage, she visited the Marquesas before arriving at Pago Pago on 27 August and served there until 7 October when she weighed anchor to return to the west coast of the United States. En route home, she stopped at Honolulu, Hawaii, before arriving back in San Francisco on 2 December. She then entered the Mare Island Navy Yard for repairs which kept her from returning to sea until 14 March 1881.

Under the command of George Belknap, she then began another extended cruise highlighted by calls at a number of Central and South American ports along the Pacific coast.

On 14 September 1881 Alaska was anchored off Callao, Peru, when a stop-valve chamber in the ships boiler ruptured. Flames began erupting from beneath the boilers, and the crew worked frantically to extinguish the fires. Subsequently, two men; 2nd Class Fireman Edward Barrett and 1st Class Fireman John Lafferty were awarded the Medal of Honor (Lafferty for the second time).

The ship carried out hydrographic surveys, sounding the Alaska Deep (now the Peru–Chile Trench) and the Alaska Rise (now the Chile Rise). That mission lasted through the remainder of 1881 and the first half of 1882. On 29 July 1882, the warship departed Callao, Peru, bound for the Hawaiian Islands, and arrived at Honolulu on 6 September. She returned to San Francisco late in the year and entered the drydock there in December. Apparently surveyed and found wanting, she was decommissioned at San Francisco on 13 February 1883 and was sold at Mare Island on 20 November 1883.

== See also ==
- List of sloops of war of the United States Navy
- Bibliography of early United States naval history
