= Kru Coast Revolt of 1915–1916 =

Kru Coast Revolt
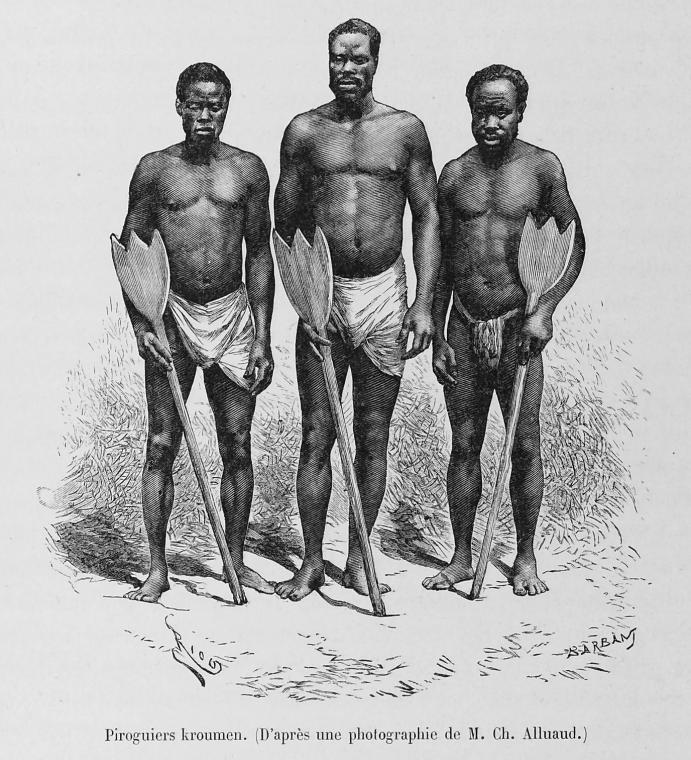
- A depiction of Kru canoers, c. 1892
Date	28 September 1915 — September 1916 (1 year)
Location	Sinoe County, Liberia
Result	Liberian victory

Belligerents
Liberia; Supported by: United States; United Kingdom (briefly; declined by Liberia)	Kru people Supported by: Gunrunners from British Sierra Leone

Commanders and leaders
Daniel Howard; Robert Lansing; Richard Bundy; Capt. Schofield; William Roundtree	unknown

Units involved
Liberian Frontier Force; Greenville militia Supported by: United States Navy; Royal Navy (withdrawn)	Kru tribes from: Fishtown; Grand Nefoo; Barto; Warpe; Settra Kru; Blue Barrow; Booter Sanguin; Rock Cess

Strength
650; USS Chester; HMS Highflyer (withdrawn)	~1,000

Casualties and losses
5 killed (2 soldiers, 3 customs officials)	Hundreds killed

The Kru Coast Revolt of 1915–1916, also called the Kru Coast Rebellion, was an armed conflict between the indigenous Kru people and the government of Liberia, which was facing economic destruction due to the First World War. In September 1915, the Kru attacked Liberian cities and forces along the coast of Sinoe County in what has been referred to as "the most serious uprising in Liberian history".

== Background ==
The Kru people, who were originally from present-day south Liberia and Cote d'Ivoire, had a longstanding maritime tradition; specifically, in collaborating with European governments in the Atlantic slave trade. Since the 15th century, Kru men had served as hired sailors and dockworkers. After the abolition of slavery, they joined Western navies in anti-slavery patrols; they were absolved into the West Africa Squadron (of the Royal Navy) and the Africa Squadron (of the U.S. Navy).

=== Earlier conflicts ===
The Kru, historically, had conflicts with the Republic of Liberia since its inception. The first Afro-Liberian colonial settlements were established in the 1830s, and were expanded farther along the coast after a series of treaties in the 1840s and 1850s.

In 1855, hundreds of Kru fought with settlers, and in 1866 a Liberian trader was murdered during a state of "perpetual unrest". In 1909, there was another armed disturbance. Additionally, the Kru chiefs appeared to be in correspondence with British authorities more frequently than Liberian ones: the relationship between the Kru peoples and Liberian government became so detached that according to British consul Erroll Macdonnel, "[the Kru] have absolutely no respect for the Liberians and only tolerate the presence of their officials if their presence does not directly affect them."

=== Kru workers abroad and involvement with the German Empire ===
The Kru were held in high regard by the Europeans. Presently referred to as "labour elite", they also found extensive employment in the colonies of German West Africa and German South West Africa (modern-day Namibia). At the close of the 19th century, there were hundreds working for the Woermann-Linie shipping company. Certain Kru were also allowed to live in white-only housing arrangements, and they were wealthier, on average, than other African workers. As a result, some were able to purchase things like gramophones and suits, which were otherwise unimaginable luxuries for people of their time and status.

Concurrent to this success, many Kru still resided in Liberia, and there was a "close economic connection" with German shipping. In 1909, it was reported that approximately 80% to 90% of Liberian trade was performed with the German Empire.

At the onset of World War I, Kru laborers in the Namibia colony were labelled as 'alien natives'. They were arrested, forced to surrender their possessions, and perform labor for the German colonial government. In their homelands, the war brought total economic destruction to the Liberian economy. German ships no longer arrived in Liberian ports; therefore within a matter of weeks, the Liberian economy was brought to a halt.

=== Kru equipment and weapons smuggling ===
The Kru participated in arms smuggling from at least 1912 until the outbreak of the revolt. Having an extensive network of canoes, traders, and maritime experience, they were also in close proximity to the Sierra Leone Colony; British soldiers conveniently sold them firearms. Kru residing in Freetown managed to send weapons home, and ammunition depots in Bassa were looted for gunpowder.

== Revolt ==
=== Early stages ===
The loss of shipping employment opportunities from the Germans (and Dutch), in addition to a reduction in British shipping activity, resulted in widespread unemployment for the Kru. The Liberian government, at the same time, was critical of the Kru for their inability to pay residence taxes, and undertook a punitive expedition to secure wealth. Additionally, the Kru (who had been self-governing to a remarkable degree of success in the last few centuries) had effectively lost their sovereignty. In response, "virtually the entire" Kru coast took up arms in open rebellion in September 1915.

=== 1915 ===
==== September ====
On 28 September 1915, Kru forces besieged the Port of Sinoe County, prompting Chargé d'affaires Bundy, of the American legation in Monrovia, to send an urgent telegram to Secretary of State Robert Lansing. Throughout (and following) the conflict, consistent telegrams would circulate between the legation in Monrovia, the Department of State, and the White House. The Kru had set fire to the port's customs building, the flow of trade and mail had ceased, and 3 customs officials were killed. The Liberian Frontier Force consisted of only 600 soldiers, all of whom were equipped with German rifles, and had insufficient ammunition to execute a long-term conflict.

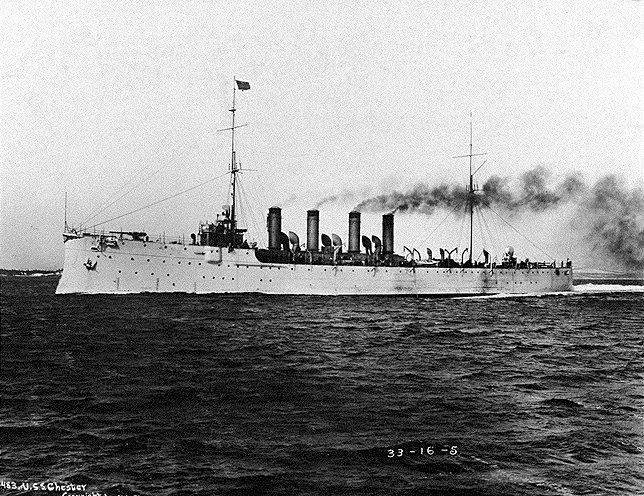
The USS Chester was deployed by the U.S. Navy to assist in suppressing the Kru Revolt

On 30 September 1915, Frank Polk sent a request to Woodrow Wilson for the deployment of the USS Chester to Monrovia.

==== October ====
On 4 October 1915, the deployment of the Chester was confirmed, with an arrival date set for 1 November.

On 18 October 1915, the British ship HMS Highflyer arrived in Monrovia. The ship's commander was ordered to provide assistance, if requested, to the Liberian government, until the arrival of the Chester. The Liberian government, for the sake of preserving neutrality, requested the ship's departure within 24 hours.

==== November ====
On 8 November 1915, the USS Chester arrived in Monrovia.

On 24 November 1915, the Liberian Frontier Force and Greenville militia ambushed the Kru, at dawn, in the village of Blue Barre. The Kru retreated after taking heavy casualties, and the settlement was razed; there was estimated to be around 1,000 destroyed houses. News of the assault spread, and more Kru were influenced to fight.

On 28 November 1915, it was reported that the Port of Sinoe was reopened after a fight. Two Liberian soldiers were killed, along with 20 Kru warriors, and the campaign was continuing.

From late November, over a thousand Kru gathered around Greenville. The Kru engaged Liberian soldiers, on small boats, from across the Sinoe River.

==== December ====
===== British response to the Kru chiefs =====
On 11 December 1915, the British Consulate General responded to a letter previously sent by the Kru chiefs:

To the Kru Chiefs of Fishtown, Grand Nefoo, Barto, Warpe, Settra Kru, Blue Barrow, Booter Sanguin, and Rock Cess:

I have received your letter of the 13th November. You have been told by me before, and also by Mr. Parks, to live peacefully and do your duty to the Liberian Government whose subjects you are ... instead of that you have foolishly and wickedly begun to fight the Liberian Government, and have used the British flag, which you have no right to use, to deceive other people into the belief that you are British subjects, and have no claims upon the British Government for protection or anything else.

I now tell you ... you must never again use the British flag; you must give up fighting with the Liberian Government, make your submission, and repair all damage you have done. It is no use writing letters to me and I will receive no more letters from you nor will I give you any more advice since you do not follow it when you receive it.

— R. C. F. Maugham., The British Consul General to the Kru Chiefs., British Consulate General, Monrovia, December 11, 1915.

On 15 December 1915, Chargé Richard Bundy, Captain Schofield (of the Chester), and President Daniel Howard (of Liberia) held a conference at the U.S. legation in Monrovia. It was decided that the Chester would proceed to the Kru coast as a morale boost for the Liberian forces.

On 16 December 1915, the USS Chester sailed to Sinoe county and the Kru coast, carrying with it 50 additional Liberian soldiers, to serve as reinforcements. Immediately after landing, the Frontier Force and U.S. officers drove back the Kru into the forest, leaving "scores of dead and wounded."

=== 1916 ===
==== January to May ====
From January to May, 1916, coastal Kru towns were bombarded, and Liberian ground troops continued to be led by U.S. officers. At that point, remaining Kru fighters were running out of ammunition, yet were still actively fighting. One American officer, William Roundtree, was described as being able to survive "any onslaught of bullets." Roundtree's contingent captured the areas of Gbeta and Kabor before advancing further into Kru strongholds by June.

==== June ====
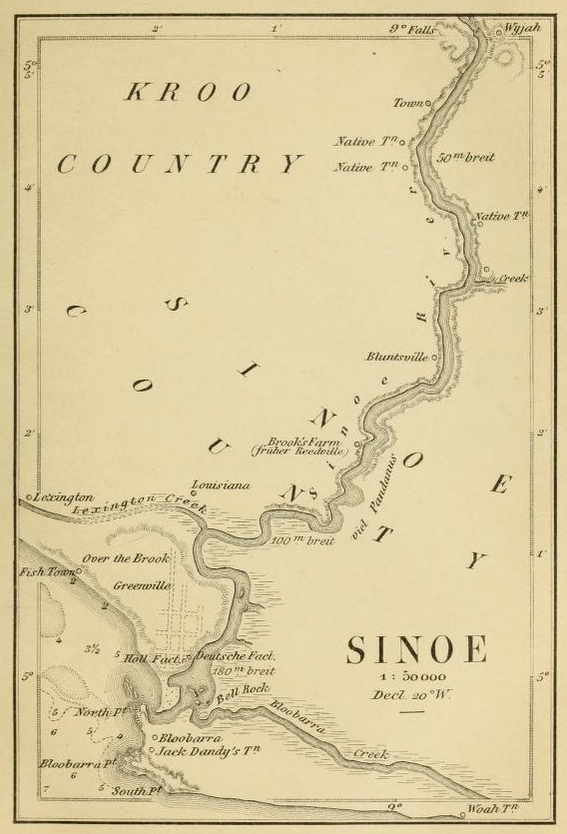
Map of Sinoe County, including "Kroo" Country, in 1890

Sometime in June 1916, after months of on-and-off fighting, the Liberian Frontier Force captured a Kru basecamp on the Sanguin river. At this point, the war was nearing its end: the Kru had taken casualties in the hundreds, and thousands were displaced among the sparsely populated forests of Sinoe County.

==== September ====
By September 1916, the revolt had been ongoing for a year, and was considered practically extinguished. Roundtree and his contingent had captured 70 Kru elders and leaders, who were imprisoned in Greenville and Monrovia, awaiting trial. Following military defeat of individual Kru clans, their elders or leaders would be called for talks with the Liberian government; upon arrival, they would be imprisoned.

== Aftermath ==
A Liberian government court martial commission had been formed by January 1917. President Daniel Howard sentenced 67 Kru chiefs and leaders to death, on charges of murder and rebellion; by the time foreign pleas for clemency reached Liberia, 47 of the accused had already been hanged. Following the trial, many Kru were also subject to exile, extra taxes and fines, and famine. Forced labor jobs became common among the Kru Coast, and Liberian soldiers were garrisoned among their communities to enforce them.

== See also ==
- Liberian–Grebo War
- African theatre of World War I
- History of Liberia
