= Didwho Welleh Twe =

Liberian politician

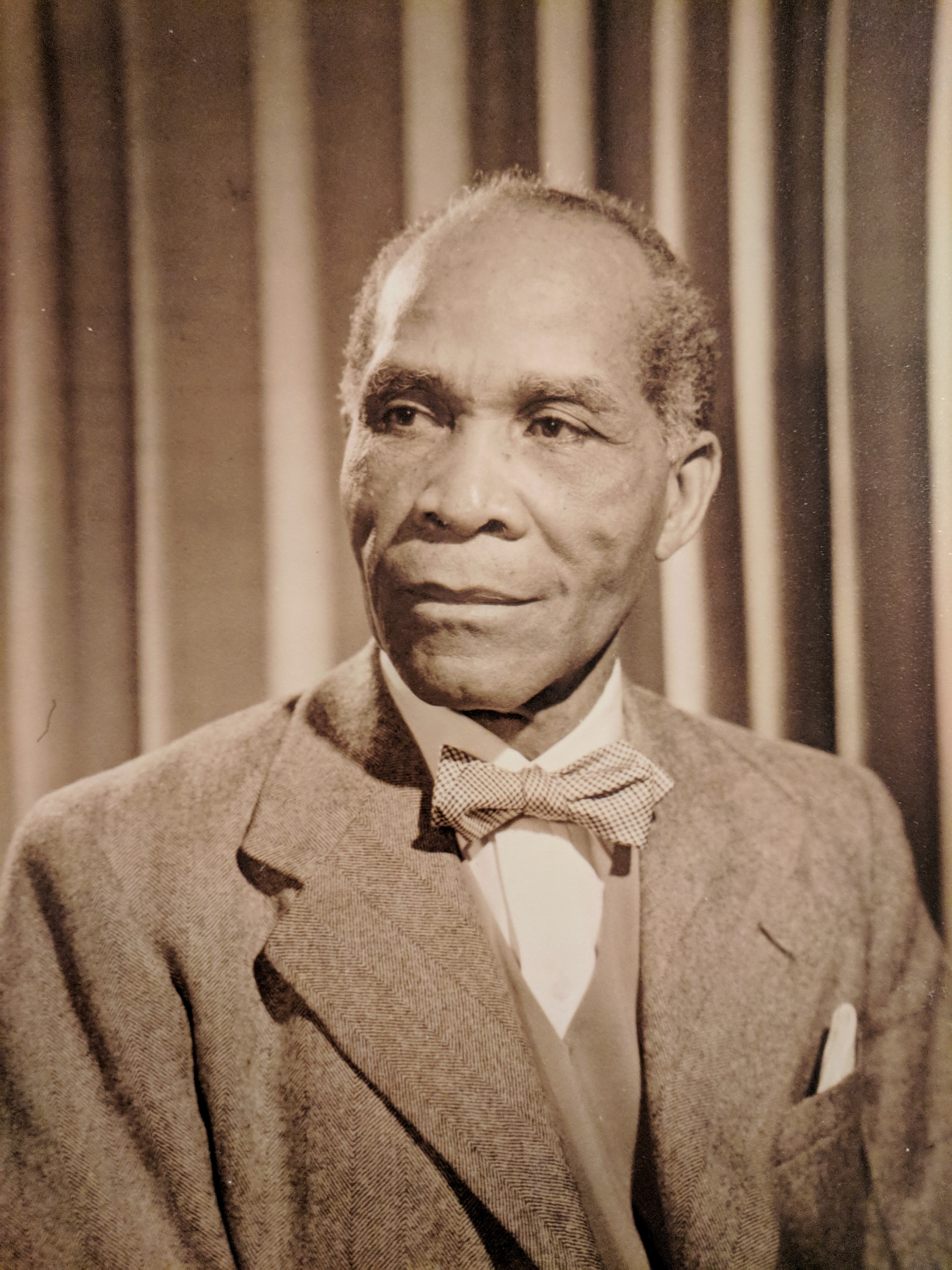
Didwho Twe as Liberian Presidential candidate in 1952

Didwho Welleh Twe (April 14, 1879 – March 19, 1961) was a Liberian politician. He became a representative in the Liberian legislature and a presidential candidate in the 1951 Liberian general election. A review of his life shows that he was an advocate of Liberian native rights and the first Liberian of full tribal background to officially and openly seek the Liberian presidency. From 1847 to 1980, the country was ruled by descendants of free people of color and former slaves from the United States known as Americo-Liberians. The descendants constituted less than ten percent of the population.

== Early life ==
Didwho Welleh Twe was born in Monrovia, Liberia on April 14, 1879, to Kru parents. Little is known about his parents except that they came from the Nana Kru section of the Kru tribe in Sinoe County and that he was named after his mother Welleh.

In 1900, he left for the US for education at age 21 with only twenty-five cents in his pocket. Congressman William W. Grout of Vermont, Senator John T. Morgan of Alabama, and American writer, Samuel Langhorne Clement, (Mark Twain), assisted in his education. Grout and Morgan later died. "He supported himself during his studies by working as a valet for a wealthy banker", and by help from Twain.

Twe had a good relationship with Mark Twain, and according to some reports, "Twe assisted Mark Twain with his book, King Leopold's Soliloquy". Interviews between Twe and Twain, discussing "the Congo Free State, Twe's memories of Mark Twain and letters that Mark Twain wrote to Twe", have been recorded.

American Chargé d'affaires in Monrovia, Clifton R. Wharton, reported that while Twe was in America, he reportedly contributed articles to the "American Journal of Psychology" edited by Doctor G. Stanley Hall and to "The Boston Transcript". Twe also helped Plenyono Gbe Wolo to gain admission into Mount Harmon Academy, a boarding school in the US, and wrote friends to financially help Wolo at Harmon. Wolo was a Liberian from Grandcess and was the first African to graduate from Harvard University.

Upon returning to Liberia, Twe assisted Robert Farmer, an American engineer, in the construction of a coastal telephone system. In 1910, Twe returned to Liberia. Two years later in 1912, President Daniel E. Howard appointed him district commissioner involved in boundary dispute matters with French Guinea and British Sierra Leone. He also became a wealthy businessman owning many acres of rubber farm in the area now called Twe farm in Bushrod Island, Monrovia. It was said that "he was one of the recipients of Firestone's gifts of 5000 rubber plants" in the early 1920s. Many other Liberian elites also benefited from the offer. Rubber was a hot commodity on the world market during that period and after. Firestone, the Liberian government, and absentee Liberian rubber farmers profited hugely from this product. The opportunity became helpful to Twe's political life.

== Political career ==
Didwho Welleh Twe

In 1927, Twe became a representative in the Liberian Legislature for New Krutown in Monrovia. However, the legislature expelled him, according to reports, for advocacy for native rights, particularly during the Fernando Po crisis. In the 1920s, native Liberians were recruited and sent to Fernando Po, a Spanish colony in Equatorial Guinea as plantation workers. The League of Nations's investigation established that the workers were forced laborers that were mistreated. Moreover, Liberian President Charles King and his Vice President Allen Yancy were said to have engaged in human trafficking and profited from this practice. The insurance policy payment of dead workers was reportedly not paid to their families but was shared by King and Yancy.

Twe's advocacy along with that of others, including chiefly Thomas J. R. Faulkner, led to the forced resignation of the president and his vice president in 1930.

The League of Nations found Liberia guilty and fined the government for the mistreatment of its native citizens. Though some public accounts state that the Edwin Barclay administration, which followed the King government, retaliated against advocates and natives who testified against the government in the League investigation, a government-commissioned report found no evidence. However, "President Edwin Barclay's efforts to contain the crisis led him to crack down on dissidents". Twe's "life was in danger"; in November 1932, he fled to the neighboring country, Sierra Leone. It was alleged that while he was in Sierra Leone, he was planning an armed revolution in Liberia. The crackdown and other actions led to the Sasstown War of 1931–1936. The Sasstown Kru, with their leader Paramount Chief Juah Nimley, fought back against the government aggression in Sasstown.

Twe returned to Liberia in 1936. He founded the United People Party (UPP) and became its standard-bearer for the 1951 presidential election. However, the Election Commission denied the party from registration saying that the party did not have the required membership for registration. UPP then joined the Reformation Party (RP), an existing and certified party. RP was established in 1949 by Richard Holder, a former official of the Edwin Barclay Administration, and contained some previous members of the True Whig Party.

RP included Americo-Liberians. The party selected Twe as its standard-bearer and Tyson Wood as vice standard-bearer. But few months before the election, the Commission stopped the party from participating in the election alleging that FP failed to register its candidate more than 60 days before the election. Consequently, the party wrote President William Tubman, sitting head of state, the UN, the US, and other international bodies complaining of violation of their right to participate in the election as a political party. Tubman was the candidate for the ruling True Whig Party. The government viewed the complaint as inviting the interference of foreign entities into Liberian domestic affairs and sought the arrest of the party's leadership. The government argued that the act was treason and hence had the legal right to arrest. However, some observers said that Tubman sensed defeat by the party and therefore used the allegation to go after the party.

It was expressed that Twe's security guard Wiah Wesseh moved him from one house to another at night and that Twe was often dressed as a woman to disguise his identity. Twe went into exile to Sierra Leone for the second time. Many of the party key members were arrested and imprisoned. On May 1, 1951, the election was held. Tubman won unopposed.

The Circuit Court found the jailed members guilty and sentenced them to multiple years. The members included Party Chairman Thorgues Sie, the party's strong supporters Bo Nimley, Robert Slewion Karpeh, and Teacher Jugbe. It was said that in their jail cell, they asked among themselves why were they imprisoned. They appealed to the Liberian Supreme Court in 1954. But the court affirmed the decision of the lower court.

It was also stated that the members refused to beg for release. But Tubman freed them after several years. After nine years in 1960, Tubman pardoned Twe, paving the way for twe's return. Many Liberians, including the Twe family, praised Tubman for the gesture. Twe died on March 19, 1961. Records show that both men were friends before Twe intended to seek the presidency. After the announcement of the intention, they went against each other.

While Twe championed the cause of the Liberian native masses, in a national speech, he praised Maltida Newport Day, an event commemorating "the massacre of natives by Matilda Newport", an Americo-Liberian settler. The oration may have bothered him so much that in his 1944 oration celebrating Liberian Independence Day, he expressed regrets for the contradiction. He said:

"In 1926 I delivered the Newport Day address for that year right in this very hall, but on that day I went against my conviction. The task was therefore a very uncomfortable one to perform, for I have always felt that the continual celebration of the destruction of men of the Bassa Tribe by Matilda Newport is a short-sighted policy to sustain. It invites ill feelings from within and criticism from without. The outside world would feel, and rightly so, that is radically wrong in Liberia where one brother fires canon in celebrating the day he was successful to kill the brother."

However, Twe also confessed that the Newport Day address landed him in the legislature.

Matilda Newport Day was later proven to be a myth and divisive. The military junta that seized power in 1980 officially stopped Matilda Newport Day as a national holiday. Also, the new government changed the name of William Tolbert High School in New Krutown to D. Twe High in honor of Twe. A new political party that emerged in the 1980s in Liberia took as its registered name, United People Party (UPP), which was Twe's first party.

Some viewers considered Twe's Independence Day address to have prophesied that the true leadership of Liberia would come from the Southeast of the country; that he advised that Liberia should adopt an open-door policy for foreign companies to invest in Liberia; that Liberia should focus on agriculture for national development; and that the "unhappiness of the native population is a legacy handed down by previous administrations and the new Tubman administration is not to be blamed, but it is the task of the government to improve the conditions.

Some analysts cited Twe's financial independence, international connections, commitment to his principle and the cause were factors that enabled him to withstand the government's temptation and pressure. A review of his political history reveals that from the time of his expulsion from the legislature, he did not seek nor accept government employment, including the appointment of Secretary of Interior by President Edwin Barclay.

Other viewers did not like the oration. Several years after in 1951, a Tubman appointee counter-argued a key premise of the oration that native Liberians have not been given leadership positions, specifically the presidency since Liberian independence in 1847. (Independence Day Address, July 26, 1951, by Honorable Oscar S. Norman, Provincial Commissioner, Liberian Hinterland, Liberianobserver.com, The National Trends of Liberia's Unifying Process) Also, others did not view Twe positively. For instance, during the election, in response to Twe's party nomination acceptance speech and other pronouncements, Tubman called him a tribalist, a divisive figure, an inherent traitor, "a senile visionary, sophisticated bigot, and an uncompromising egotist".

== Education ==
Twe started his primary education in Liberia. He continued his secondary schooling in the US, attending St. Johnsbury Academy and Cushing Academy, both private boarding schools in Vermont and Massachusetts respectively. He graduated from St. Johnsbury Academy. He also graduated from Rhode Island College of Agriculture and the Mechanic Arts and later did post-graduate studies in agriculture at Harvard and Columbia universities. The college was created in 1892. In 1951, it became a part of the University of Rhode Island, which was established that year. The university alumni record lists Twe as an alumnus.

== Family Life ==
Didwho Welleh Twe married Arminta Dent, the first ex-wife of President Tubman. Twe had many children, including D. Twe, Jr., and Tarloh Twe Patterson.

== Later life and death ==
Twe died in Monrovia on March 19, 1961.
