= Robert O. Wray =

Robert O. Wray, Jr.
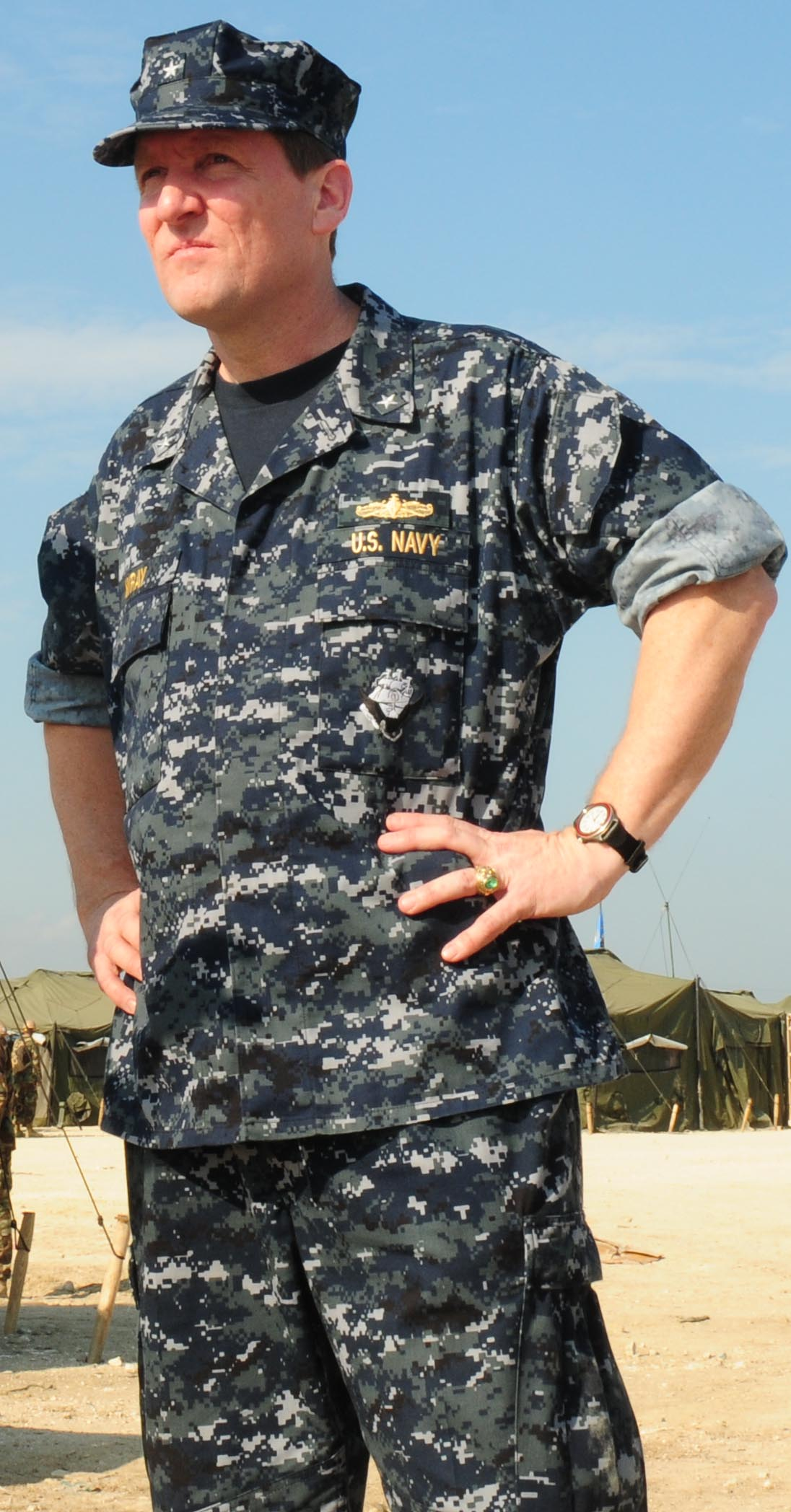
- RAdm. Wray in Haiti in 2010
- Born: 1957 (age 68–69); New York
- Military career
- Allegiance: United States of America
- Branch: United States Navy
- Service years: 1979-2013
- Rank: Rear admiral (upper half)

Rear Admiral Robert O. Wray Jr., United States Navy, is a businessman, author and retired two-star admiral who was the President of INSURV, the Navy's Board of Inspection and Survey. He is now CEO of BlueStar TeleHealth, based in Washington DC. He is Vice Chair of the Board of Vinson Hall, the continuing-care-retirement-community (CCRC) for the U.S. Navy, Marine Corps, and Coast Guard. Wray is also adjunct professor of leadership at the Uniformed Services University of Health Sciences, the Med School of the Department of Defense, as well as the executive director of the Flag and General Officers Network, the only association of retired admirals and generals in the US, numbering some 1500 members.

== Navy career ==
Wray graduated from the US Naval Academy in Annapolis, Maryland in May 1979, with a B.S. in mechanical engineering. While at the Naval Academy, he earned three varsity letters and was captain of the offshore sailing team. He was also the chairman of the Brigade Honor Committee.

Upon graduation he entered the Navy's nuclear power program. He attended six months of classroom training in Orlando Florida, and then six months of hands-on reactor operations in Saratoga New York. Upon successful qualification as a nuclear officer in October 1980, he was assigned to the nuclear cruiser USS Mississippi (CGN-40) in Norfolk, Virginia.

Wray served on the Mississippi for four years, leaving in the summer of 1984. During those four years he completed several deployments to the Caribbean, North Atlantic, and Mediterranean, including duty off Lebanon during the 1983 Lebanon crisis.

He then spent two years teaching and conducting reactor operations at the Navy reactor prototypes at the Naval Reactors Facility in Idaho Falls, Idaho. In late 1986, he transitioned to the United States Navy Reserve, and moved to New England.

Between 1986 and 2004, Wray served in a number of different reserve units, serving part-time on weekends and during summer training periods. He commanded five different units and had significant reserve leadership roles in New England, San Diego, and Naples, Italy.

In 2004, Wray returned to temporary active duty to support the transition of sovereignty back to the Iraqi government. Working as a Navy Captain on an interagency team reporting to Secretary of Defense Donald Rumsfeld and Secretary of State Colin Powell, Wray specialized in security for the contractors involved in the reconstruction of Iraq. He spent several months at the Pentagon working this issue, and then several more on-scene in Baghdad. There he founded and was the first chief of operations for the first-ever operations center coordinating contractor, military, non-governmental operations in reconstruction.

In 2007, Wray was promoted to rear admiral and in early 2008 returned to full-time Navy active duty. His first flag position was as Deputy Commander, Military Sealift Command, in Washington DC. Military Sealift Command (MSC) operates approximately 180 ships for the Navy and Department of Defense, providing combat logistics force capabilities, special missions, pre-positioning of DoD supplies worldwide, and strategic sealift.

After three years at MSC, in October 2010, Wray was promoted to rear admiral (upper half) (O-8, or two-stars). He was assigned as Vice Commander of U.S. Naval Forces Europe and Africa, US Sixth Fleet, in Naples Italy.

After only six months in this position, he was assigned as president, Navy Board of Inspection and Survey (INSURV), Norfolk Virginia, in March 2011. INSURV was established by Congress in 1882 and is tasked with inspecting the ships, submarines, and carriers of the Navy, and reporting on their readiness to the Secretary of the Navy and Congress.

Wray also authored a number of papers during his naval career, including "The Utility of a Three-Tiered Navy," for the US Naval Institute's Proceedings Magazine.

== Civilian career ==
Upon transitioning from active-duty Navy in 1986, Wray worked as a civilian nuclear engineer on Navy submarines in Portsmouth NH and Charleston SC. He then left the nuclear power industry, moved to Rhode Island, and began a varied entrepreneurial career spanning 20 years. His positions included: President of a real-estate development and construction company, CEO of a circuit-board manufacturing company, owner of a consulting firm providing services to banks, partner and general manager of a resort hotel, and owner of a diesel-engine services company.

In the late 1990s, in an effort to capitalize on the growing move toward electrical deregulation, Wray developed and patented a device which improved the use of electricity for medium-sized commercial and industrial users. He and partners formed a company, Powergy, to manufacture and sell the product. As electrical deregulation subsided with little real change to the energy markets, Powergy shifted to focus on web-based energy controls through a spinoff called Energy-Online (EOL). In early 2002, Wray sold Powergy and Energy-Online, and went to work for EOL's acquirer, Pace Global Energy Services. Pace was later acquired by Siemens.

From Pace, Wray was mobilized to Iraq duty, first at the Pentagon, and then in Baghdad. Returning from Baghdad in November 2004, he became the Division Manager for the 300-person Newport division of Science Applications International Corporation (SAIC). For three years he led a turnaround of that division, and expanded into new products and markets. He left SAIC when brought back onto active duty as a Navy admiral.

In 2010 he received a master's degree in leadership from the MacDonough School of Business at Georgetown University in Washington. He has written a book on leadership and lectures on the topic before academic, commercial, and military audiences.

Wray is a licensed professional engineer and he has a registered US Patent # USD391225. In addition to his book on leadership, he is the author of Getting the Job You Want: The Five-Finger, Five-Week Guide to the Best Job of Your Life.

Following his transition from the Navy in October 2013, Wray founded and became CEO of the Blue Star Veterans Network, a company providing telemedicine to American veterans population.

Military decorations include the Distinguished Service Medal, Legion of Merit (four awards), the Bronze Star and numerous lesser awards.

- Navy Distinguished Service Medal
- Legion of Merit
- Bronze Star Medal

== Personal ==
Wray was born in New York in 1957, the second oldest child of an Air Force family. He spent his childhood in New York, Maryland, Alabama, Delaware, and South Carolina, graduating from Bishop England High School in Charleston in 1975.

In 1980 he married the former Tina Palso of Pasadena Maryland, an author and college professor. They settled in Barrington, Rhode Island, and raised a family of three children. Wray was active in the community, including stints at church positions, youth sports management, and local political volunteering. In 2007 they were divorced.

In 2011 he married the former Maryellen Pool of Dover Delaware, who also has three children. They live in North Potomac, Maryland, and together have 6 grandchildren.

In the 2024 United States presidential election, Wray endorsed Kamala Harris.
