= Board of Inspection and Survey =

U.S. Navy organization

INSURV at work

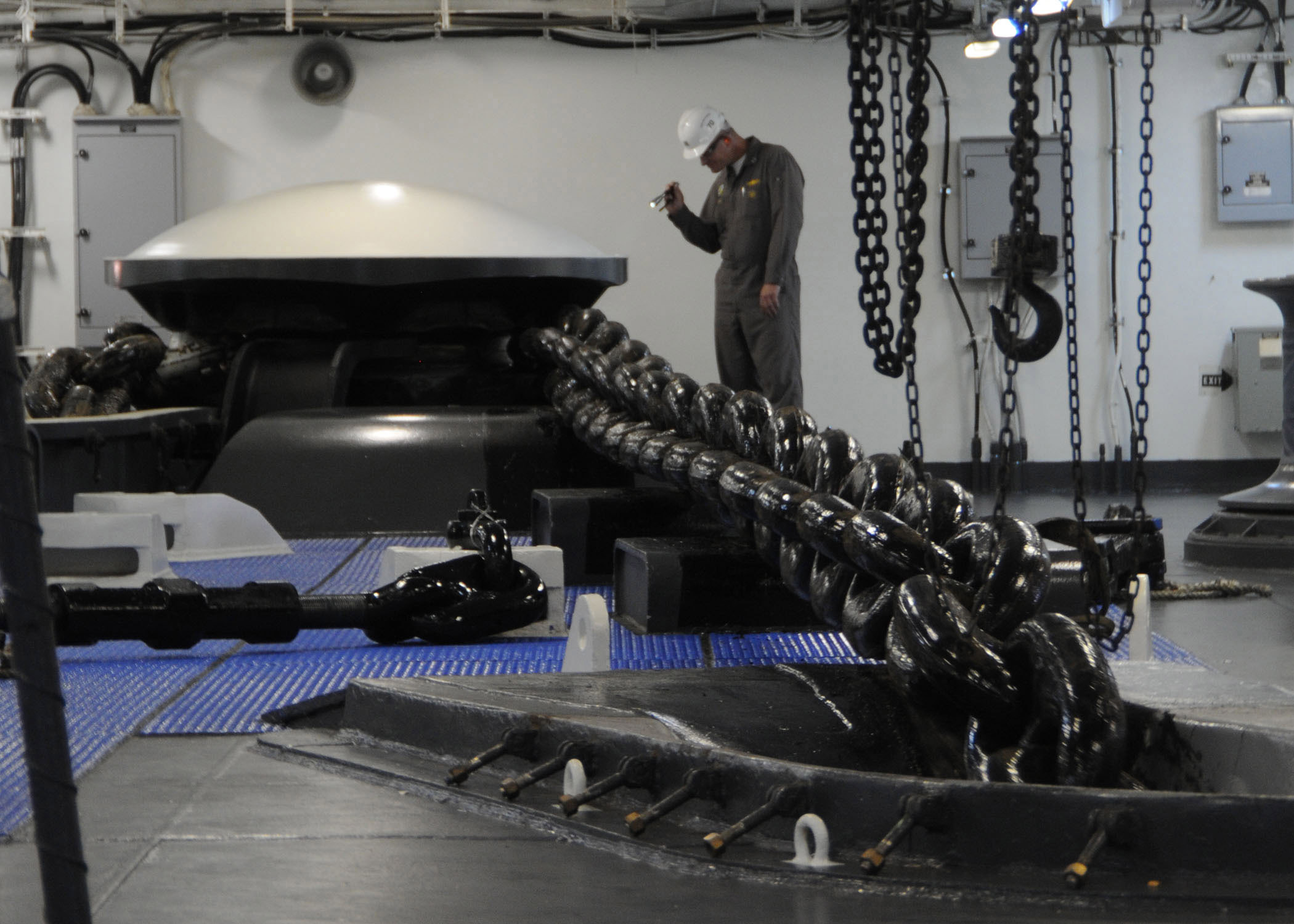
An inspector assesses an anchorage test in the forecastle aboard the aircraft carrier USS Carl Vinson (CVN-70).

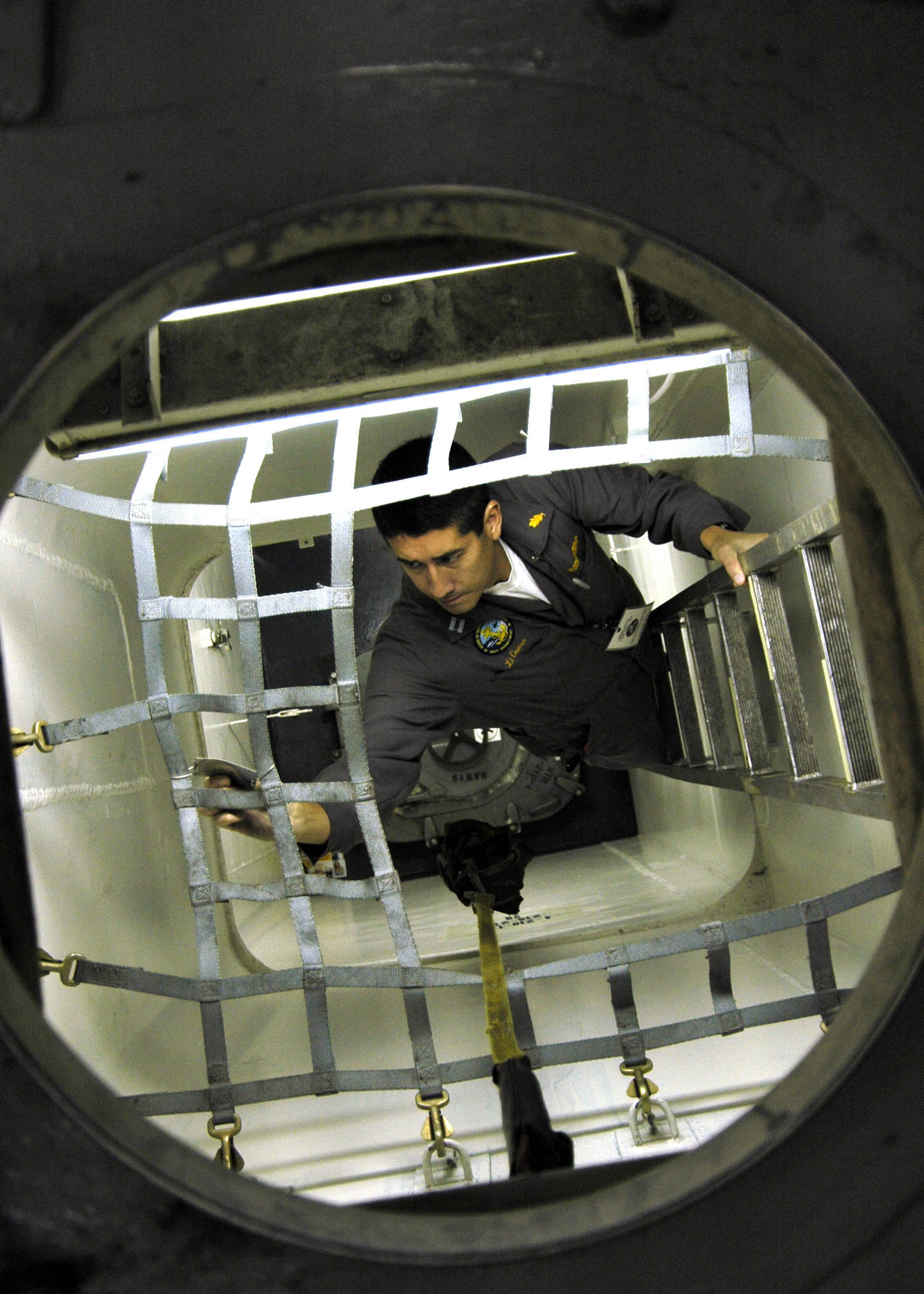
Cargo netting aboard the Nimitz-class aircraft carrier USS Abraham Lincoln (CVN-72) is inspected.

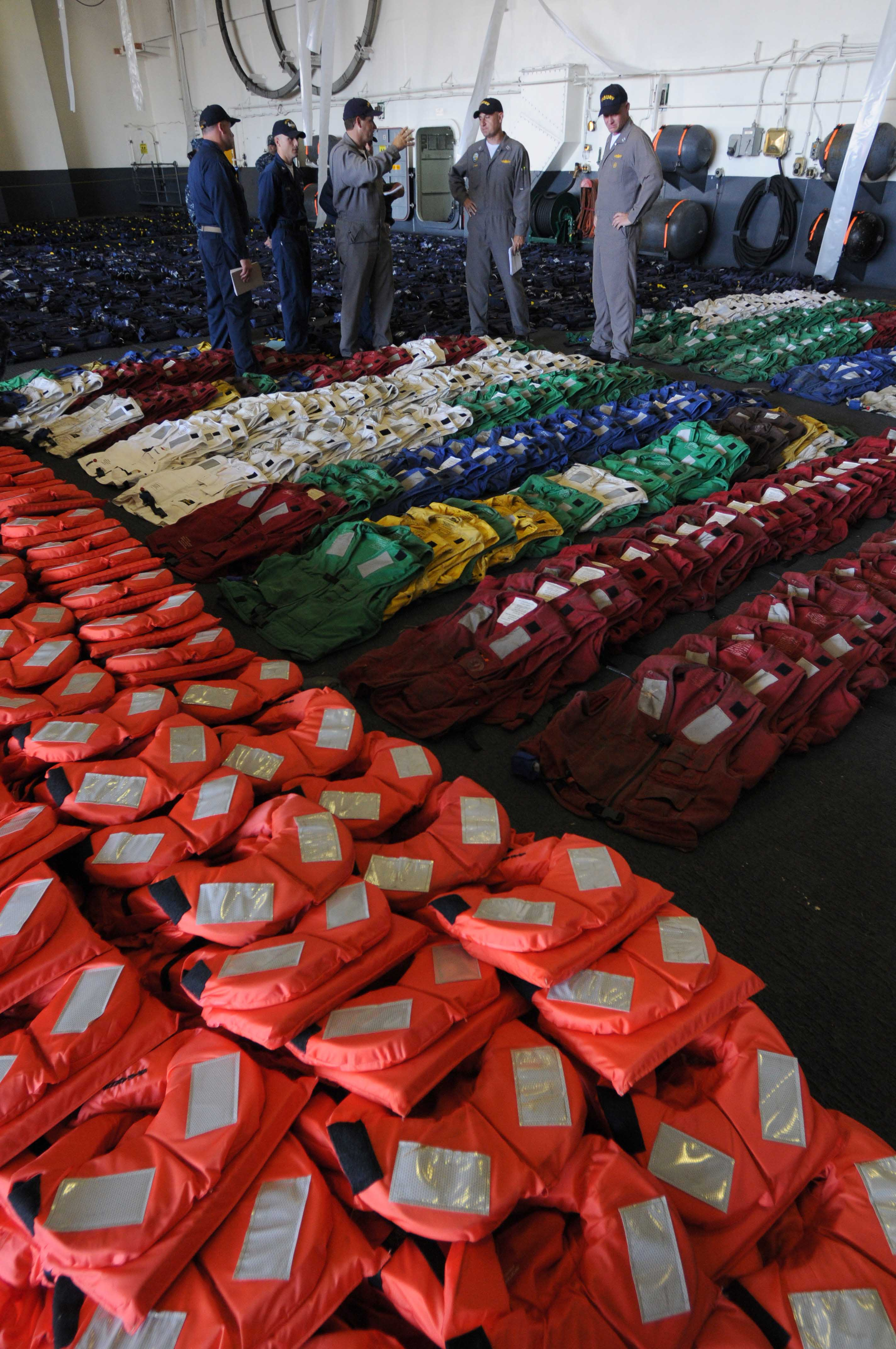
Inspectors discuss the process of counting the 6000+ float coats aboard the aircraft carrier USS Ronald Reagan (CVN-76).

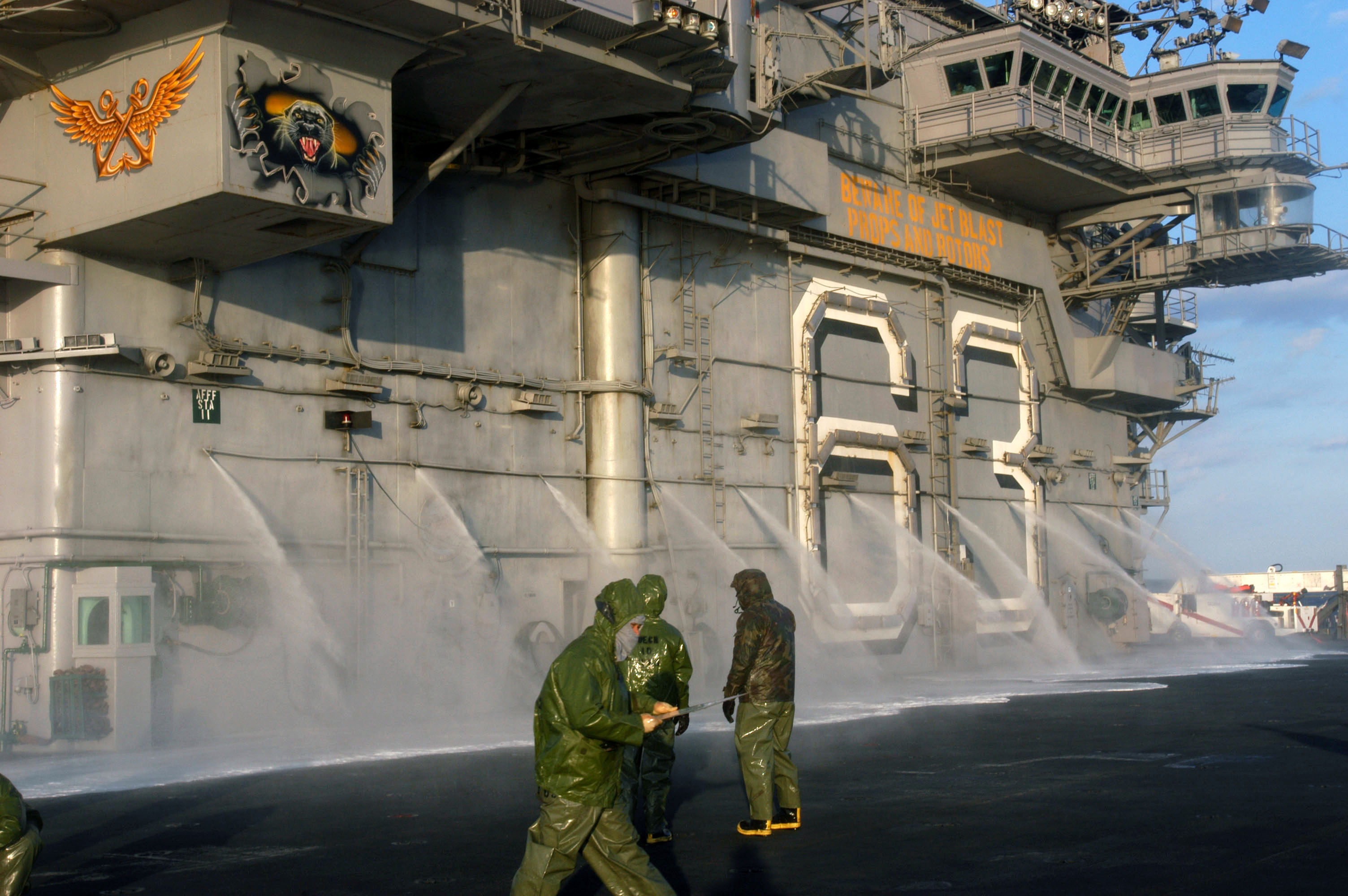
Inspectors check USS Kitty Hawk's (CV-63) counter-measure wash-down system.

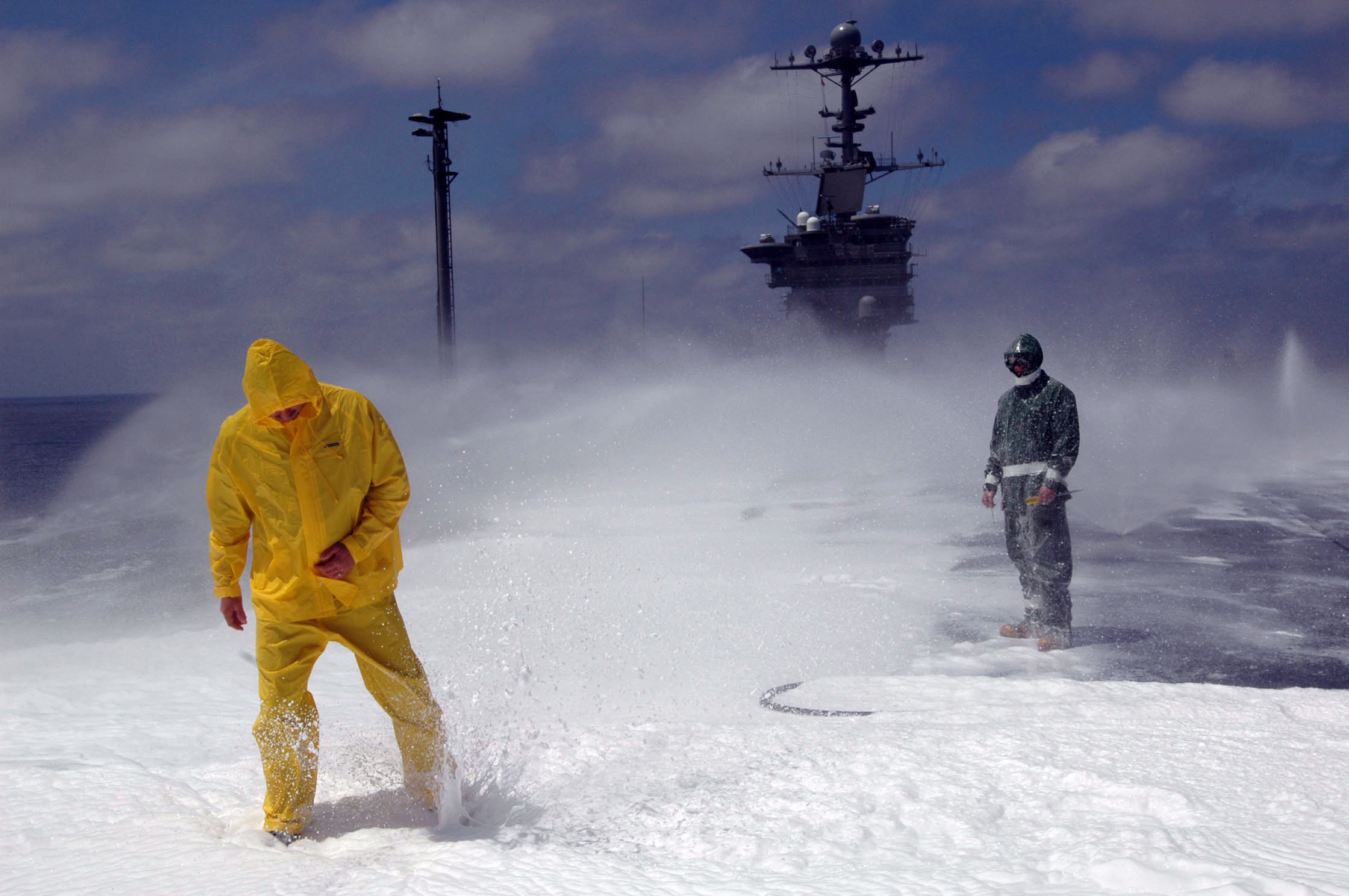
Sprinkler nozzles are inspected during a test of the flight deck's aqueous film forming foam system aboard the Nimitz-class aircraft carrier USS John C. Stennis (CVN-74).

The Board of Inspection and Survey (INSURV) is a United States Navy organization whose purpose is to inspect and assess the material condition of U.S. Navy vessels.

The Board is currently headquartered at Naval Amphibious Base Little Creek, Virginia.

== INSURV teams ==
The Board performs its tasks by sending out teams at intervals not to exceed 60 months per Naval Ship. These teams evaluate a ship's readiness to conduct combat operations at sea, through an extensive system of checks on installed equipment.

== New construction ==
When a ship has been constructed by a shipyard and turned over to the U.S. Navy, an INSURV team must certify the vessel prior to declaring it operational.

== History ==
The Board of Inspection and Survey was established by Congress to ensure that the ships of the United States Navy are properly equipped for prompt, reliable, sustained mission readiness at sea. Originally established in 1868 under Admiral David Farragut, the board was reconstituted in 1877 with Admiral David Porter as head of the board, expanding on the tasks he had assumed as duties under an instruction of November 16, 1870.

On August 5, 1882, Congress enacted legislation which established the Board of Inspection and Survey under statutory authority. Commodore Alexander A. Semmes was the first officer to assume the title as President, Board of Inspection and Survey. INSURV has been operating continuously under this authority since that date.

In 2008, six Navy ships, including the destroyer Stout, guided missile cruiser Chosin, and amphibious assault ship New Orleans, failed their INSURV inspections. More than two dozen other ships were found to have critical deficiencies. Parting from a past practice of publicly releasing INSURV inspection results, the Navy immediately classified the 2008 reports. In response, US Senator Jim Webb, in April 2009, asked the Senate Armed Services Committee to look into the Navy's decision. Said Representative Rob Wittman in support of Webb's action, "I am deeply concerned that a decision to classify these reports across the board would inhibit the Congress' ability to provide necessary and constitutionally mandated oversight."

== Mission ==
The Secretary of the Navy and the Chief of Naval Operations (CNO) have designated the President, Board of Inspection and Survey (PRESINSURV) as their agent to perform the following statutory, regulatory and contractual requirements:

- Develop and establish CNO policy and procedures for trials, material inspections, and surveys of ships and service craft consistent with law, regulations, and the terms of contract.
- Examine Naval vessels periodically by a board of Naval officers to determine fitness for further service.
- Conduct material inspections and surveys of ships and service craft and provide assessment of the material readiness of these vessels.
- Provide independent verification of a newly constructed ship’s readiness for acceptance/delivery; and to determine if builder responsible equipment is operating satisfactorily during the guarantee period following acceptance.
- Based on observations during Board of Inspection and Survey assessments, provide timely, candid, and accurate findings to Fleet Commanders, Type Commanders, NAVSEA, and appropriate OPNAV offices together with recommended actions where appropriate.
- Conduct environmental protection and NAVOSH oversight inspection of Naval ships to include equipment, program compliance, and training. A combined NAVOSH/EP assessment will be conducted during non-MI Fleet Readiness Periods (FRPs), not to exceed 36 months.
- Compile statistical information and analysis on material deficiencies, providing the CNO, Numbered Fleets, NAVSEA, and other higher authorities such information as they may require.

== Presidents of the board ==
| Name | Dates |
|---|---|
| Adm. David Farragut | 1868 |
| ?? | 1869—1877 |
| Adm. David Dixon Porter | 1877 |
| Comm. George H. Cooper | 1877—1880 |
| ?? | 1880—1881 |
| Comm. Alexander Alderman Semmes | 1882—June 1883 |
| Comm. J.C. DeKrafft | August 1883—October 1885 |
| R.Adm. Edward Simpson | October 1885—March 1886 |
| R.Adm. James Edward Jouett | June 1886—February 1890 |
| R.Adm. Lewis Kimberly | March 1890—April 1892 |
| R.Adm. George Belknap | April 1892—January 1894 |
| Comm. Thomas O. Selfridge Jr. | March 1894—October 1895 |
| Comm. George Dewey | November 1895—November 1897 |
| R.Adm. Frederick Rodgers | October 1898—February 1901 |
| R.Adm. Robley Dunglison Evans | February 1901—April 1902 |
| Capt. Charles J. Train | January 1903—February 1904 |
| Capt. James H. Dayton | February 1904—February 1906 |
| R.Adm. Charles Stockton | February 1906—May 1906 |
| Capt. Hugo Osterhaus | May 1906—September 1906 |
| R.Adm. Joseph N. Hemphill | September 1906—May 1907 |
| Capt. Richardson Clover | May 1907—June 1908 |
| R.Adm. Thomas C. McLean | June 1908—December 1909 |
| Capt. Chauncey Thomas | January 1910—October 1910 |
| R.Adm. Thomas Snowden | October 1910—November 1911 |
| Capt. Augustus Francis Fechteler | November 1911—November 1913 |
| Capt. Henry Braid Wilson | November 1913—May 1916 |
| Capt. William A. Gill | May 1916—October 1918 |
| RADM George W.Kline | October 1918—July 1921 |
| R.Adm. Charles Peshall Plunkett | August 1921—November 1922 |
| R.Adm. N. A. McCulley | December 1922—June 1923 |
| R.Adm. Alexander S. Halstead | June 1923—August 1923 |
| R.Adm. G. H. Burrage | August 1923—October 1926 |
| R.Adm. Lucius A. Bostwick | October 1926—October 1928 |
| R.Adm. Frank H. Brumby | November 1928—June 1929 |
| R.Adm. George C. Day | July 1929—September 1929 |
| R.Adm. Sumner Ely Wetmore Kittelle | September 1929—June 1931 |
| R.Adm. George C. Day | June 1931—October 1935 |
| R.Adm. J. D. Wainwright | October 1935—May 1937 |
| R.Adm. Harry L. Brinser | July 1937—September 1940 |
| R.Adm. John W. Wilcox Jr. | September 1940—December 1941 |
| R.Adm. David M. LeBreton | December 1941—November 1942 |
| R.Adm. Walter Stratton Anderson | November 1942—June 1944 |
| R.Adm. Arthur G. Robinson | June 1944—March 1945 |
| R.Adm. Leigh Noyes | March 1945—June 1946 |
| R.Adm. Frank A. Braisted | July 1946—March 1951 |
| R.Adm. Calvin T. Durgin | March 1951—September 1951 |
| R.Adm. James H. Doyle | September 1951—May 1952 |
| R.Adm. John M. Higgins | May 1952—May 1954 |
| R.Adm. Richard F. Stout | May 1954—June 1959 |
| R.Adm. F. D. McCorkle | June 1959—November 1960 |
| R.Adm. Donald C. Varian | December 1960—July 1961 |
| Capt. W.M. Ryon | August 1961—November 1961 |
| R.Adm. Eugene B. Fluckey | November 1961—March 1964 |
| R.Adm. Harry L. Reiter | March 1964—June 1967 |
| R.Adm. John D. Bulkeley | June 1967—August 1988 |
| Capt. David J. Klinkhamer | August 1988—September 1988 |
| R.Adm. Theodore E. Lewin | September 1988—July 1992 |
| R.Adm. Phillip R. Olson | July 1992—July 1996 |
| R.Adm. Henry F. Herrera | July 1996—December 1997 |
| R.Adm. John T. Lyons III | December 1997—May 1999 |
| R.Adm. William R. Schmidt | May 1999—August 2002 |
| R.Adm. Curtis A. Kemp | August 2002—July 2006 |
| R.Adm. Michael P. Nowakowski | July 2006—April 2007 |
| R.Adm. Raymond Michael Klein | April 2007—November 2009 |
| R.Adm. John N. Christenson | November 2009—March 2011 |
| R.Adm. Robert O. Wray | March 2011—October 2013 |
| R.Adm. Jeffrey A. Harley | October 2013—October 2014 |
| R.Adm. Michael E. Smith | October 2014—August 2015 |
| R.Adm. Samuel Perez Jr. | August 2015—July 2016 |
| R.Adm. Jon C. Kreitz | July 2016—September 2017 |
| R.Adm. Erik M. Ross | June 2017—May 2019 |
| R.Adm. Christopher Engdahl | May 2019—April 2021 |
| R.Adm. Randall Peck | April 2021—May 2023 |
| R.ADM Todd Whalen | May 2023---Present |

== See also ==
- Composite Training Unit Exercise (COMPTUEX) - tests crew readiness before US warships deploy
- Flag Officer Sea Training (FOST) - British equivalent of INSURV and COMPTUEX
