= Liberian–Grebo War =

Date	September 8, 1875 – March 1, 1876 (5 months and 22 days)
Location	Maryland County, Liberia
Result	Liberian victory

Belligerents
Liberia; Supported by: United States	Grebo people

Strength
(Liberia) 1,000 men (United States) 1 ship (USS Alaska)	30,000 men

Casualties and losses
(Liberia) 6 killed	unknown

The Liberian–Grebo War, or simply the Grebo War, was an armed conflict between the Liberian government and the indigenous Grebo people.

== Background ==
The area that is now Maryland County was first settled in 1834 by freed African-American slaves and freeborn African Americans primarily from the U.S. state of Maryland, under the auspices of the Maryland State Colonization Society as part of the Back-to-Africa movement. It was granted independence as the Republic of Maryland in 1854. In 1856, the Republic of Maryland requested military aid from nearby Liberia in a war with the Grebo and Kru peoples who were resisting the Maryland settlers' efforts to control their trade in slaves. Liberian President Joseph Jenkins Roberts assisted the Marylanders, and a joint military campaign resulted in victory. Following a referendum in February 1857 the Republic of Maryland joined Liberia as Maryland County on 6 April 1857.

There was tension between the Grebo people and the Americo-Liberian-dominated government of Liberia — descendants of freed African Americans — since the establishment of the Cape Palmas colony in 1857. Efforts at reconciliation had been largely unsuccessful, and the Grebo were unwilling to assimilate into the business and social structures of the Liberian state. The aggressive use of Methodist and Episcopalian missionaries also alienated many Grebos. Motivated by Grebo nationalism and ethnic separatism, the Grebos attempted to establish the "G'debo Reunited Kingdom."

== War ==
The Grebo people, numbering 30,000 armed men entrenched in Cape Palmas and along the Cavalla River, declared war on the Liberian government for having confiscated their land under the auspices of the Maryland State Colonization Society. The Liberian military, however, had only around 1,000 men with meager supplies, and ill-suited to the terrain compared to the Grebos.

The first major battle of the war took place on September 8, 1875, when Grebo tribesmen, armed with Snyder rifles, attacked Cape Palmas. The attack was repelled, with 6 Liberians killed.

On October 11, 1875, United States Minister to Liberia, James Milton Turner, sent a letter to the U.S. State Department, arguing for United States involvement in the war while due to the risks to American citizens and assets, noting that "two thirds of American [business] interests in Liberia are situated in Maryland County." In mid-December 1875, U.S. President Ulysses S. Grant ordered a man-of-war as a show of force to stop the war.

On February 3, 1876, the USS Alaska arrived in Monrovia.

On March 1, 1876, the Grebos signed a peace treaty, agreeing to "fully and unequivocally" acknowledge the authority of the Liberian government, effectively ending the rebellion.

== Peace treaty ==
With the peace treaty, the Grebos agreed "to fully and unequivocally ... acknowledge the Supremacy of the Government of Liberia and agree to submit to its laws."

== See also ==
- Ivory Coast expedition
- African Slave Trade Patrol
- Blockade of Africa
- Kru Coast Revolt of 1915–1916
