= Kru people =

Ethnic group in West Africa

Kru
Regions with significant populations
- Ivory Coast Liberia; Sierra Leone
- Ivory Coast: ~3,048,500 (2026) (Note: Estimates of "9.1%" and "33.5" (millions, 2026) used respectively.)
- Liberia: ~409,500 (2026) (Note: Estimates of "7% of the population" and "5.85" (millions, 2026) used respectively.)
- Ghana: ~35,000
- Sierra Leone: ~16,000

Languages
- Native; Kru; Also; Bété • Liberian Kreyol • Krio • Bassa • Nouchi • Dida • Guéré • Nyabwa • Krumen • Ahizi • Godié • Krio • Liberian English • Sierra Leonean English • Ghanaian English • Ivorian French

Religion
- Majority; Christianity; Minority; African traditional religions • Sunni Islam • Irreligion

Related ethnic groups
- Bassa • Jabo • Krahn • Grebo

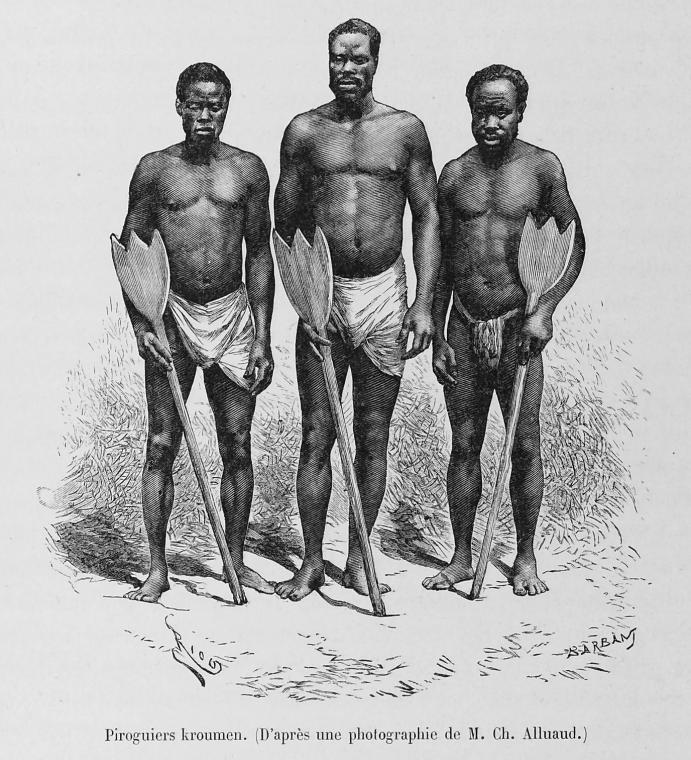
Kru canoers depicted by French engraver Alluaud

The Kru, Krao, Kroo, or Krou are a West African ethnic group who are indigenous to western Ivory Coast and eastern Liberia. European and American writers often called Kru men who enlisted as sailors or mariners Krumen. They migrated and settled along various points of the West African coast, notably Freetown, Sierra Leone, but also the Ivorian and Nigerian coasts.

The Kru-speaking people are a large ethnic group that is made up of several sub-ethnic groups in Liberia and Ivory Coast. In Liberia, there are 48 sub-sections of Kru tribes, including the Jlao Kru. These tribes include Bété, Bassa, Krumen, Guéré, Grebo, Klao/Krao, Dida, Krahn people and Jabo people.

== History ==
During the Atlantic slave trade, Kru people were considered more valuable as traders and sailors on slave ships than as slave labor, and Kru oral traditions strongly hold that they were never enslaved. To ensure their status as “freemen,” they initiated the practice of tattooing their foreheads and the bridge of their nose with indigo dye to distinguish them from slave labor. Many were called Krumen by Europeans, and hired as free sailors on European ships in both the slave trade and trade in goods.

The Kru sailors were famous for their skills in navigating and sailing the Atlantic. Their maritime expertise evolved along the west coast of Africa where they made a living as fishermen and traders. Knowing the in-shore waters of the western coast of Africa, and having nautical experience, they were employed as sailors, navigators and interpreters aboard slave ships, trading ships, and American and British warships used against the slave trade.

The Kru history is one marked by a strong sense of ethnicity and resistance to occupation. In 1856, when part of Liberia was still known as the independent Republic of Maryland, the Kru along with the Grebo resisted Maryland settlers' efforts to control their trade. They were also infamous amongst early European slave raiders as being especially resistant to the slave trade.

This resistance included the Kru Coast Revolt of 1915-1916, which saw many Kru killed by American and Liberian reprisals.

=== Origins ===
Oral tradition remains the most important key to the origin of the Kru. Traditions recorded in the mid nineteenth century by James Connelly relate that the Kru communities that lived along the shore of what is today southern Liberia and the reputed core settlement of the Kru came down to the coast from the interior "some three generations back — say one hundred to one hundred fifty years..." from an original place he called Claho. Coming down the Poor River they "learned the value of salt" and founded the town of Bassa. They subsequently moved again to Little Kroo, and then were subsequently joined by more Kru-speaking communities from the interior.

These events likely occurred in the 18th century and are believed to be connected to more intensive European interest in trade in the region at this time. The original settlers from the interior eventually established five towns: Little Kroo, Setra Kroo, Kroo-Bar, Nana Kroo and King Will's Town, that came to be regarded as their home district, though soon other offshoots developed along the coast, and particularly in Freetown, Sierra Leone.

These accounts are often biased because of Europeans' lack of understanding the Kru language; for example, the term "Bar" or "bah" would signify a river mouth, rather than the proper name of a town. The towns listed by European and American authors are often Anglicized; Settra Kru's name in the Klao language is actually Welteh. Many debates over Kru origins and settlement persist today, including the oft-cited origin of the Kru name as originating in a ship's "crew." In actuality, the title "Kru" comes from an Anglicized version of the Kru term for their own tribe: Klao.

=== Seafaring ===
From the late eighteenth century onward, Kru men, from whence the term Krumen derives, began working on European ships. By the 1790s the inhabitants of their original region were being hired as free sailors on European ships. As the so-called "legitimate trade" replaced the slave trade in the nineteenth century and as trade along the West Africa coast increased, many Kru sailors signed on to the new vessels as seamen. In the process there developed Kru communities around all the major trading factories of the coast, from Sierra Leone around to the mouth of the Congo River.

Between 20 and 30 of Kroomen are buried in the Seaforth Old Burial Ground in Simon's Town, South Africa, where their graves can still be seen, and Kroomen is the name used to describe them on their gravestones. They were active in the Royal Navy from 1820 to as late as 1924. For example, HMS Thistle landed a camp party with 12 Krumen in Elephant Bay in June 1924. Many Kroomen joined the dockyard staff, while others remained on board RN ships as seamen. They were given Westernized or diminutive names by the men on the ships, Tom Ropeman, Bottle of Beer, and Will Cockroach amongst them. They were clearly commonly employed, and the names bestowed were not original, since the cemetery contains for example the remains of Tom Smith Number 1, to distinguish him from another Tom Smith.

Kru sailors were organized as small companies under a headman. They would paddle in small canoes as far as a dozen miles out to sea to meet ships as they arrived and negotiated their employment on the spot. Headmen often carried credentials from previous stints of employment in boxes or other containers, and negotiations were conducted rapidly. During the earlier part of the nineteenth century foreign observers often gave the Kru high praise for their honesty, courage, efficiency and willingness to do hard work. Later observers, however, had more disparaging comments to make, though either way, few ships plied African waters without many Kru sailors on board.

Although initially Kru men were interested only in sailor's work, in time some took up land based employment doing all sorts of work in the many trading factories that grew up all along the African coast from Sierra Leone to the mouth of the Congo River. They were also recruited as soldiers and common laborers, some traveling as far as India and the Malayan peninsula to the east. Some Krumen workers served French employers in the French attempt to dig the Panama Canal, others were employed in Jamaica. Others formed communities in the UK, like the Kru town in Liverpool.

=== Culture ===
In the late nineteenth century, reports described the Kru as divided into small commonwealths, each with a hereditary chief whose duty was simply to represent the people in their dealings with strangers. This remains the case in many enclaves today. Power was vested in the elders, who wore as insignia iron rings on their legs. Their president, who held religious authority as well, guarded the national symbols, and his house was sanctuary for offenders until their guilt is proved. Personal property was held in common by each family. Land also was communal, but the rights of the actual cultivator ceased when he failed to farm it.

In 1930s, several Kru proverbs was collected from Sie Tagbwe, when he was interviewed extensively by American anthropologist Melville J. Herskovits. This action contributed to the preservation of these proverbs for future generations.

=== Religion ===
The first descriptions of core group of Kru religion were done by missionaries, notably James Connolley, but these accounts can also be augmented by more detailed accounts of the Grebo of nearby Cape Palmas who were linguistically and culturally related. The central elements of the spiritual universe of this region included a figure identified by missionaries as a high, creator God, named Nyesoa, spirits or deities associated with territories, and familial spiritual guardians or the souls of the departed, who remained nearby and could influence events.

In some areas of Liberia, these spiritual entities were contacted through a class of people called deya, who underwent long and specialized training and apprenticeship to take up their office. They addressed problems both medical and spiritual using pharmaceutical and spiritual remedies.

=== Kru language ===
Wilhelm Bleek classified the Kru language with the Mandingo family, and in this he was followed by R. G. Latham; S. W. Koelle, who published a Kru grammar (1854), disagreed. Now Kru is considered a primary branch of the Niger-Congo family.

== Distribution ==
The Kru are one of the many ethnic groups in Liberia, comprising 7% of the population. Theirs is also one of the main languages spoken. The Kru are one of the main indigenous group players in Liberia's socio-political activities.

== Notable people ==
Notable ethnic Krus include the 25th President of Liberia George Weah, who is of mixed Kru, Gbee, Mano, and Bassa heritage, and his predecessor, President Ellen Johnson Sirleaf, who is of mixed Kru, Gola, and German ancestry. Dr. George Toe Washington, former Armed Forces Chief of Staff of Liberia and ambassador to the United States, Canada, and Mexico, is of Kru and Grebo ancestry. Football star William Jebor is exclusively of Kru background.

Mary Broh, the former mayor of Monrovia, is of mixed Kru and Bassa ancestry. Didwho Twe, a judge and politician who ran for President of Liberia in 1951, was of Kru heritage.

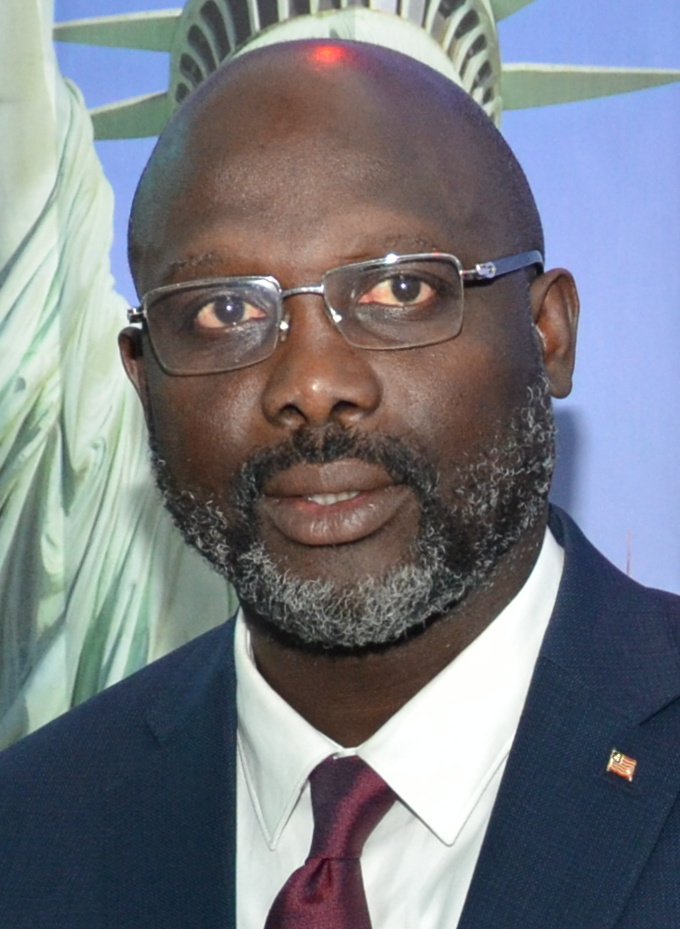
George Weah (1966–), 25th President of Liberia (2018–2024)

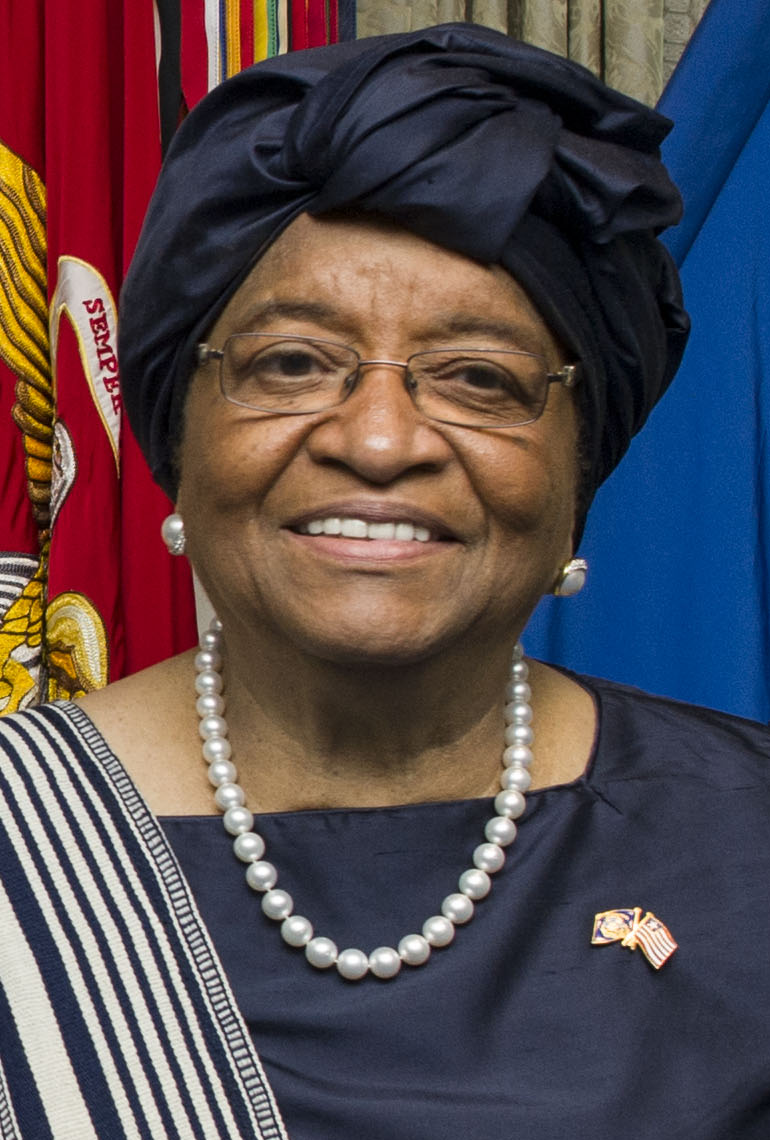
Ellen Johnson Sirleaf (1938–), 24th President of Liberia (2006–2018)

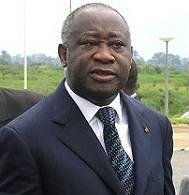
Koudou Laurent Gbagbo (1945–), 4th President of Ivory Coast (2000–2011)

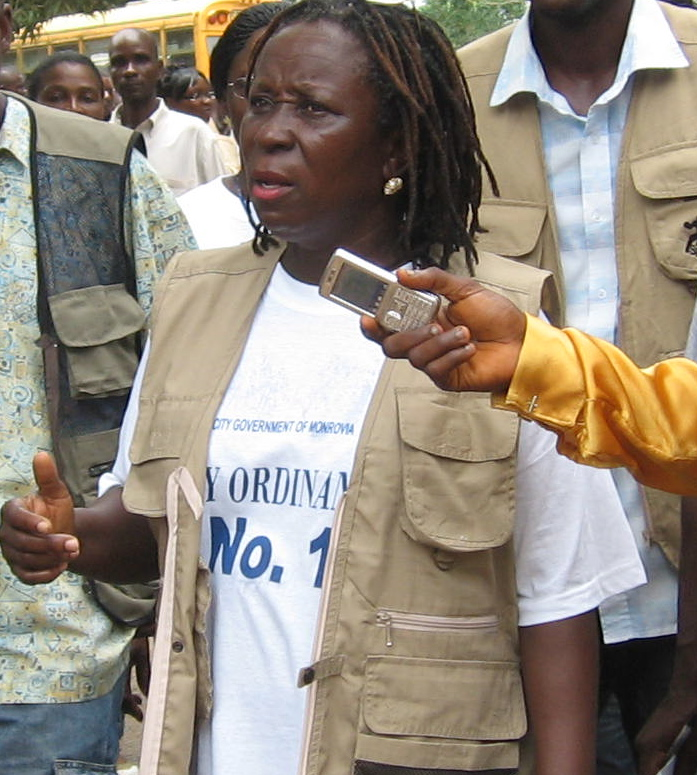
Mary Broh (1951–), mayor of Monrovia, Liberia (2009–2013)

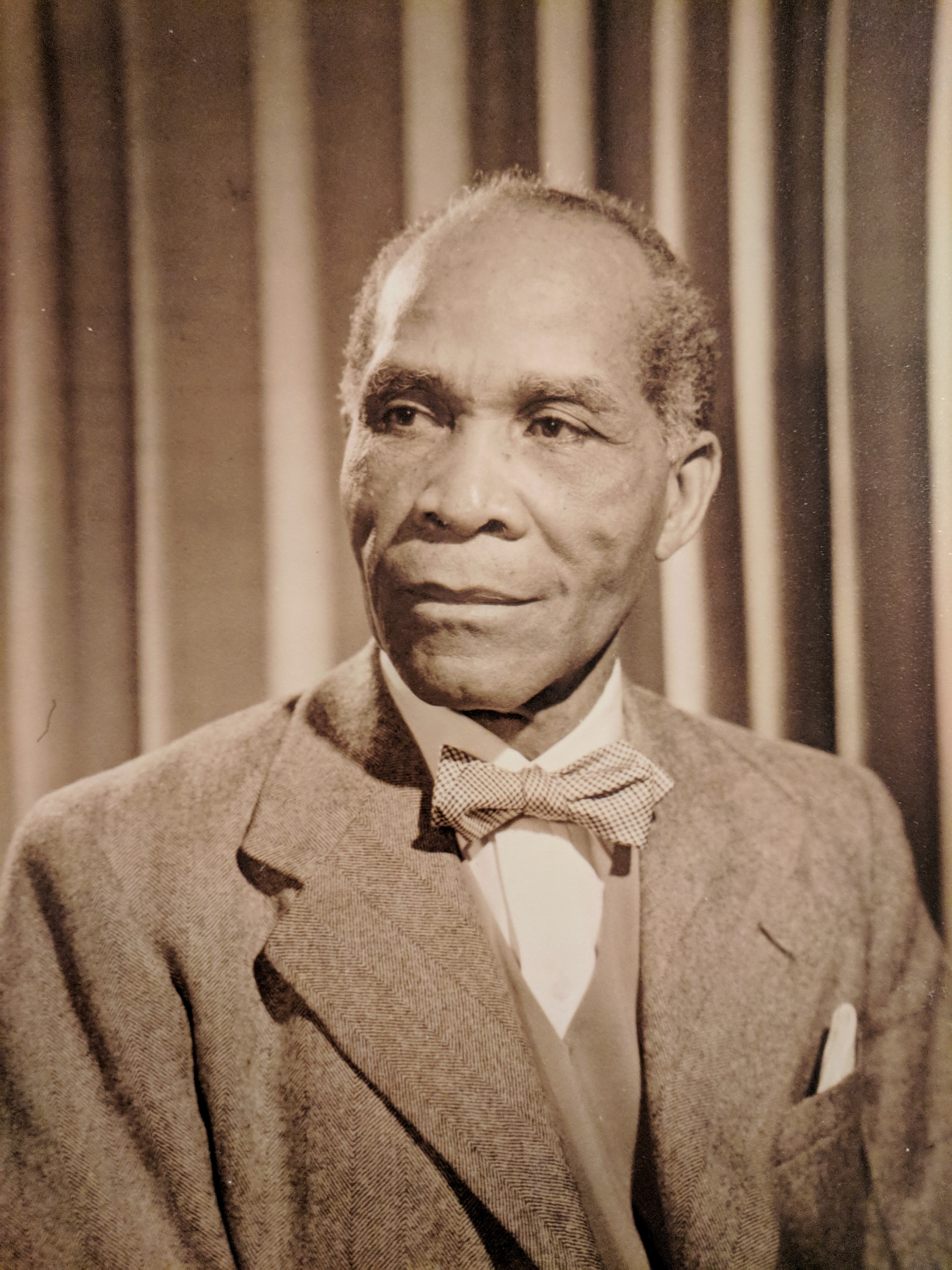
Didwho Welleh Twe (1879–1961), candidate for the Liberian Presidency in 1951

== See also ==
- Kru languages
- Seedies and Kroomen
