= USS Wamsutta =

Gunboat of the United States Navy

History

United States
- Name: USS Wamsutta
- Namesake: Wamsutta, (c. 1634-1662), a Native American leader
- Launched: 1853
- Acquired: 20 September 1861
- Commissioned: 14 March 1862
- Decommissioned: 3 December 1862
- In service: 2 February 1863
- Out of service: 29 June 1865
- Fate: Sold, 20 July 1865

General characteristics
- Displacement: 270 tons
- Length: 129 ft 3 in (39.40 m)
- Beam: 26 ft 8 in (8.13 m)
- Draft: 11 ft (3.4 m)
- Propulsion: steam engine; screw-propelled
- Speed: 9 knots (17 km/h; 10 mph)
- Armament: four 32-pounder guns; one 20-pounder Parrott rifle

USS Wamsutta was a steamer constructed for service with the Union Navy during the American Civil War. She was used by the Union Navy as a gunboat in support of the Union Navy blockade of Confederate waterways.

== Service history ==
Wamsutta—a screw steamer built in 1853 at Hoboken, New Jersey—was purchased by the Union Navy on 20 September 1861 at New York City from H. Haldrege; and commissioned on 14 March 1862, Acting Volunteer Lieutenant William L. Stone in command. Wamsutta was assigned to the South Atlantic Blockading Squadron and arrived in Port Royal, South Carolina, harbor on 14 April 1862. The next day, she received orders to report to Comdr. Edmund Lanier, in Alabama, for blockade and reconnaissance duty in St. Simon's Sound, Georgia. On 27 April, while on an expedition to destroy a brig believed to be near Dorchester, Georgia, Wamsutta and Potamska engaged a company of dismounted Confederate cavalry on Woodville Island in the Riceboro River. The battle lasted 40 minutes. Wamsutta suffered two casualties and received superficial damage to her port side.

On 8 May, again accompanied by Potomska, Wamsutta proceeded to Darien, Georgia, to capture stored lighthouse machinery. However, a search of the town on the 9th found nothing, and the two gunboats withdrew that evening. Wamsutta remained off Darien, blockading Doboy Sound, Georgia. On 4 August 1862, Wamsutta departed Doboy Sound to blockade St. Catherine's Sound, Georgia. There, she and Brazileira captured the schooner Defiance on 19 September. On 8 November, a broken air pump forced Wamsutta to Port Royal for repairs. Ultimately, she proceeded to the New York Navy Yard where she was decommissioned on 3 December 1862. Wamsutta was recommissioned there on 2 February 1863 and returned to the South Atlantic Blockading Squadron, arriving off Port Royal on the 13th. Five days later, she proceeded to Doboy Sound to tow Fernandina into position to blockade the entrance to the sound.

On the 28th, Wamsutta was ordered to Sapelo Sound, Georgia, to relieve Potomska and remained until ordered to Wassaw Sound, Georgia, on 29 March to relieve Marblehead. By 1 May, Wamsutta lay off Charleston, South Carolina, but spent the remainder of May and the first two weeks of June repairing and re-provisioning in Port Royal. Wamsutta arrived back off Sapelo Sound on 15 June 1863. Four days later, she was relieved by Midnight and ordered to proceed to Doboy Sound to relieve Fernandina. After serving there for most of the summer, Wamsutta headed north on 5 September for repairs in the Philadelphia Navy Yard. She was decommissioned there on 14 September 1863. Wamsutta was reactivated on 24 April 1864 at Philadelphia, Pennsylvania, and was ordered back to the South Atlantic Blockading Squadron. She arrived in Port Royal harbor on 6 May and was assigned to blockade duty off Georgetown, South Carolina.

On 3 June, she chased the British steamer Rose aground there and burned the blockade runner. On 9 June, while reconnoitering Confederate island batteries scattered about Winjah Bay, South Carolina, she drew sporadic fire from shore batteries. On 14 July, Wamsutta returned to duty in Charleston and carried out frequent operations against Confederate vessels from her anchorage off Morris Island, South Carolina. On 22 October, she helped chase the blockade runner Flora aground near Fort Moultrie, South Carolina. On 5 December 1864, she drove off an unidentified blockade runner attempting to slip into port. On 4 February 1865, Wamsutta and Potomska ran another schooner aground, but the crew of the potential prize burned the ship before the Federals could take possession of her. Finally, two days later, Wamsutta turned back a blockade runner attempting to reach Charleston. Late in April, Wamsutta was reassigned to duty off St. Simon's Island, Georgia. She remained there through May and sailed for the Portsmouth Navy Yard (Kittery, Maine) early in June. She was decommissioned at Portsmouth, New Hampshire, on 29 June 1865 and was sold at public auction there on 20 July to Otis Seabury.
