= Jabo language =

Kru language of Liberia

Jabo
- Pronunciation: [ ɟʱɑbo]
- Native to: Liberia
- Ethnicity: Jabo
- Language family: Niger–Congo?: Atlantic–Congo; Kru; Grebo; Southern; Jabo

Language codes
- ISO 639-3: (included in Southern Grebo [grj])
- Glottolog: jabo1238

The Jabo language (pronounced [ɟʱɑbo]) is a Kru language spoken by the Jabo people of Liberia. They have also been known in the past as the Gweabo.

== Classification ==
Jabo is part of the Grebo language continuum, encoded by Ethnologue more specifically as a dialect of the Southern Grebo language. However, Jabo satisfies the ISO 639-3 criteria for an individual language:

- The shared core-vocabulary score for Jabo and Seaside Grebo is reported as being as low as 75%.
- The Jabo and Grebo political territories have been distinct at least since the time of the founding of "Maryland in Africa." The two peoples are currently in different counties (Grand Kru County and Maryland County), and the Jabo claim a greater affinity for the Kru (Krao) than for the Grebo.
- The physical separation of the Jabo and Grebo areas by the Deeah (Decoris) river is also an effective barrier to social intercourse and commerce.
- The Jabo and the Grebo have different origin legends, and thus have no shared identity.
- The Jabo are highly ethnocentric, and consider themselves to be a nation with its own language.

On the other hand, the commercial interaction of the Grebo peoples, together with exogamy, produces widespread multilingualism, magnifying the impression of homogeneity of the varieties of Grebo. Additionally, the goal of literacy is facilitated by a unificationalist approach to the varieties.

== Sources ==
The Jabo language is known to scientific linguistics in some level of detail because it was analysed by the respected linguist Edward Sapir, and extensively transcribed by his doctoral student George Herzog. Both Sapir and Herzog relied upon the cooperation of Charles G. Blooah as their native informant. Most of the material was recorded on site in Liberia by Herzog, who was primarily a folklorist and ethnomusicologist. His interest in the Jabo language centered on its use in the oral literature of proverbs and sayings, and also in the Jabo drum-signalling system. This became focus of the corpus he collected. There is a natural overlap between these areas, since many of the drum signals are formulaic in nature and are based on elements of the oral literature.

This may also have entailed that much of the material recorded was originally uttered in a declamatory, rhetorical, or performance style. It has not been established the degree to which such style might depart from more informal styles of Jabo speech. However, this material is the basis of what is presented below.

== Phonology ==
=== Tone ===
As analyzed by Sapir, Jabo was represented as possessing four phonemically distinct pitch levels (or registers), independent of phonation type or supraglottal articulation. Furthermore, mono-moraic (short syllable) glides from any register to any other register were phonotactically possible. This meant that there could possibly be sixteen distinct, segmentally-identical short monosyllables with significative pitch contours—more if long syllables were admitted. The not-uncommon word types CVː (CVV) and CVCV could potentially have 256 possible prosodic contours, each with a different dictionary meaning for the same three or four segments.

Sapir devised a system of "tone letters" for specifying tone, but they are inconvenient to typeset and not included in the Unicode inventory. The common convention for Kru languages is to mark tone with subscript or superscript tone numbers following the vowel, with 1 denoting the highest register. They may also be transcribed in the IPA with tone letters or diacritics. The default tone of the language, in Jabo tone 2, is generally left unmarked in a diacritic system. As an example, take the word [ɟʱɑbo] "Jabo people", which is tone 2. For literacy purposes some system of diacritics would likely be preferable.

	Level	Glides		
High	a₁ [á]	(a₁₂)	(a₁₃)	(a₁₄)
Mid	a₂ [a]	a₂₁	(a₂₃)	(a₂₄)
Low	a₃ [à]	a₃₁	a₃₂	(a₃₄)
Bottom	a₄ [ȁ]	a₄₁	a₄₂	a₄₃

Falling contour tones (parentheses) are very rare. Where they occur, they seem to be in imitation of other languages or dialects.

=== Vowels ===
The vowels marked with a subscript dot are said to be "dark" or "turbid". This is usually understood as being due to an articulation with pharyngeal constriction. Advanced tongue root position or faucalization may also be involved. This last possibility may make it simpler to rationalize the apparent markedness of the extreme vowels [u] and [i], which are said always to be "turbid".

Nasalized versions of [ɛˤ], [ɔˤ], and [aˤ] were reported, but it is doubtful whether they have phonemic status. Since the articulations involved are probably to a degree mutually exclusive (velic and pharyngeal), and since they seem to contribute similar auditory components (nasalization and "turbidity"), they are more likely to be allophones resulting from assimilation. Sapir was an excellent phonetician, so his transcriptions may be narrowly accurate, whatever their phonological implication. In the case of Herzog or Blooah, one suspects that there may have been a normalization attempt by the transcriber. This nonetheless gives an appearance of vowel harmony to Jabo phonology.

	Front			Mid			Back		
	plain	nasal	pharyn- geal	plain	nasal	pharyn- geal	plain	nasal	pharyn- geal
High	i	ĩ					u	ũ	
High-Mid	e	ẽ	eˤ				o	õ	oˤ
Low-Mid	ɛ	ɛ̃	ɛˤ				ɔ	ɔ̃	ɔˤ
Low				a	ã	aˤ			

Syllabic nasals [m̩] and [n̩] also occur. Related to this is a phenomenon of prenasalization, termed "anacrusis" by Sapir by analogy with the metrical term. It is probably best accounted for systematically by an underlying syllabic nasal, since it occurs with some approximants, as well as with voiced plosives.

=== Consonants ===
		Labial	Alveolar	Retroflex	Palatal	Velar	Labial- velar	Glottal
Plosive	voiceless	p	t		c	k	k͡p	
Plosive	voiced	b	d					
Plosive	breathy	bʱ ⟨b⟩	dʱ ⟨d⟩		ɟʱ ⟨j⟩	ɡʱ ⟨g⟩	ɡ͡bʱ ⟨gb⟩	
Fricative	voiceless	f	s		ʃ ⟨ṣ⟩			h
Fricative	breathy	v̤ ⟨v⟩	z̤ ⟨z⟩		ʒ̤ ⟨ẓ⟩			
Nasal		m	n	ɳ ⟨ṇ⟩	ɲ ⟨ñ⟩	ŋ	ŋ͡m ⟨ŋm⟩	
Approximant		w	l		j ⟨y⟩			

The forms enclosed in brackets show the orthography used by Sapir/Herzog; other forms are the same.

Segments [ʃ], [ʒ], [l] and [ɳ] probably have only allophonic status. Word initial [l] occurs only in loans from English. The retroflex nasal occurs in only a single word, but that word [ɳa] meaning "possessive" is very common.

Consonants here called "breathy" are those termed "emphatic" by Sapir. The plosives are here marked with a superscript hooked h ([ʱ]), while the continuants are marked with a subscript diaeresis. The contrastive use of this feature defines a major isogloss separating Jabo from Glebo.

== Implications of the Jabo evidence for linguistic theory ==
The metalinguistic import of the Jabo tonemic repertory becomes apparent when the attempt is made to select phonological distinctive features to represent the tonemes, whether binary or n-ary features. This in turn has implications for linguistic universals. However, the possibility exists that Sapir's analysis is overdifferentiated (i.e., the transcription is too "narrow" to claim tonemic status).

This tonal system implies an extremely high level of significative functional load to borne by pitch in the language. As such it has been cited over the years by a number influential theorists in the phonological field, such as Trubetskoy and others.

A similar situation exists in the vowel space postulated by the Sapirean analysis. Since tongue and jaw position, nasalization and pharyngealization are all significative in this model, the vowel space is crowded indeed, with from 19 to 22 possible vowels, not counting diphthongs or long vowels.

The emphatic consonants of Jabo were once thought to be an example of the emergence of an implosive consonant series. There currently does not seem to be any evidence to suggest this.

== Literacy and educational proposals ==
Glebo (Seaside Grebo) had possibly the earliest literary history of any speech variety in the Cape Palmas area, dating to the time of the missionary efforts associated with Maryland in Africa. Nonetheless, Jabo, rather than Glebo, has been proposed by the SIL survey as the basis of a unification orthography or Ausbausprache for the speech varieties of the Southern Grebo group, despite the prestige and precedence of Glebo.

This choice may be due to Jabo's preserving a number of "archaic" features from the proto-language, if it is indeed the case that its highly differentiated phonology reflects a common stage of development. The pedagogic principle would be that it is easier to teach across heterogeneous groups from a differentiated writing system (to a variety in which the contrast has been merged), than the reverse. Students speaking the less differentiated variety need only learn to ignore the "superfluous" distinctions as heterographic homonyms, rather than memorizing numerous, seemingly random heterophonic homographs.

== Bibliography ==
- Herzog, George. "Drum Signaling in a West African Tribe," Word 1:217-38, 1945. Reprinted in: Language in Culture and Society, pp. 312–23. Ed. Dell Hymes. New York, 1964.
- Herzog, George, and Charles G. Blooah. Jabo Proverbs from Liberia: Maxims in the Life of a Native Tribe. London, Pub. for the International Institute of African Languages & Cultures by Oxford University Press, H. Milford, 1936.
- Ingemann, Frances, and John Duitsman. "A Survey of Grebo Dialects in Liberia," Liberian Studies Journal, 7(2):121–131, 1976.
- Joseph Greenberg, The Languages of Africa. Indiana Univ. Press, 1966.
- Hasselbring, Sue and Eric Johnson. A sociolinguistic survey of the Grebo language area of Liberia. SIL Electronic Survey Reports 2002-074, 2002. Online version: .
- Sapir, Edward. "Notes on the Gweabo Language of Liberia," Language, 7:30-41, 1931.
- Sapir, Edward, With Charles G. Blooah. "Some Gweabo Proverbs," Africa, 2:183-185, 1929.
- Trubetskoy, Nikolai S.Grundzüge der Phonologie. [Principles of Phonology]. Travaux du Cercle Linguistique de Prague, 7. Prague, 1939.
- WPA Federal Writers' Project, Life History Manuscripts from the Folklore Project, 1936-1940. Online version: Library of Congress American Life Histories: Manuscripts from the Federal Writers' Project, 1936 - 1940, Item 27 of 312 (Nebraska), "Charles Blooah" .
