= 1946 Liberian constitutional referendum =

Referendum granting female suffrage

A constitutional referendum was held in Liberia on 7 May 1948. The change to the constitution was approved in the Legislature in December 1949, and would grant women the right to vote. It was approved by voters and came into force on 10 December 1949.

== Constitutional change ==
The proposed change would be to Chapter I, article 11, section one.

| Original text | New text |
|---|---|
| All elections shall be by ballot and every male citizen, of twenty-one years of age, possessing real estate, shall have the right of suffrage | All elections shall be by ballot and every citizen (male and female), of twenty-one years of age, possessing real estate, shall have the right of suffrage |

A two-thirds majority in the vote was necessary for the changes to be approved.
