= 1945 Liberian constitutional referendum =

Referendum granting suffrage to the three inland provinces

A constitutional referendum was held in Liberia on 1 May 1945. The change to the constitution was approved in the Legislature in December 1945, and would grant the right to vote to citizens living in the three inland provinces, providing they paid a "hut tax". It also granted parliamentary representation to Grand Cape Mount County and Marshall territory. The changes were approved by voters.

== Constitutional change ==
The proposed changes would be to Chapter I, article 11 and Chapter II, article 2.

Section	Original text	New text
Chapter I article 11	All elections shall be by ballot and every male citizen, of twenty-one years of age, possessing real estate, shall have the right of suffrage.	All elections shall be by ballot and every male citizen, of twenty-one years of age, possessing real estate, shall have the right of suffrage. When applied to voters in the Provinces of the hinterland of the Republic, "possessing real estate" shall be construed to include possessing a hut on which he pays the hut tax.
Chapter II article 2	The representatives shall be elected by, and for the inhabitants of the several counties of Liberia, and shall be apportioned among the several Counties of Liberia as follows: The County of Montserrado shall have four representatives; the County of Grand Bassa shall have three representatives; the County of Sinoe shall have three representatives; the County of Maryland shall have three representatives; and all counties that shall hereafter be admitted in the Republic shall have one representative; and for every ten thousand inhabitants one representative shall be added. No person shall be a representative who has not resided in the county two whole years immediately previous to his election and who shall not when elected, be an inhabitant of the county, and does not own unencumbered real estate of not less value than one thousand dollars in the county in which he resides and who shall not have attained the age of twenty-three years.	The representatives shall be elected by, and for the inhabitants of the several counties and provinces of Liberia, and shall be apportioned among the several Counties and Provinces of Liberia as follows: The County of Montserrado shall have five representatives; the Territory of Marshall shall have one representative; the County of Grand Bassa shall have four representatives; the County of Sinoe shall have four representatives; the County of Maryland shall have four representatives; the County of Grand Cape Mount shall have three representatives; and the three existing Provinces of the Republic situated in the hinterland thereof shall each have one representative; and all counties that shall hereafter be admitted in the Republic shall have one representative; and for every ten thousand inhabitants one representative shall be added. No person shall be a representative who has not resided in the county or province two whole years immediately previous to his election and who shall not when elected, be an inhabitant of the county, and does not own unencumbered real estate of not less value than one thousand dollars in the county in which he resides or who in the provinces shall not own a hut in which he resides and for which he pays the hut tax; and who shall not have attained the age of twenty-three years.

A two-thirds majority in the vote was necessary for the changes to be approved.
