= Jabo people =

Ethnic group of Liberia

Jabo (pronounced [ɟʱɑbo], variant spellings Dyabo, Djabo) is the self-designation of an ethnic group located in the southeastern part of the Republic of Liberia in West Africa. They have also sometimes referred to themselves as Gweabo or Nimiah tribe.

English speakers also use the name of the group for a single member of that group, or for their speech variety.

== Tribe ==
Like many of their neighbors in the area, the Jabo have very pronounced ethnocentric attitudes, and are frequently referred to both by themselves and by others as a tribe, a term that in Liberia has a meaning imprecise at best. Confusion may arise due to the circumstance that in Liberia the English word "tribe" is also sometimes applied to the second-order administrative "districts," which are not necessarily congruent with "tribes" defined in local ethnotaxonomic terms. "Tribe" is also occasionally used for a third-order administrative "clan" when the latter comprises multiple ethnic clans, as well as for a variety of other more or less ad hoc groups.

The Jabo describe themselves as a "confederation of tribes.", or even "a nation".

== Location ==
The area inhabited by the Jabo is now mostly in the Lower Kru Coast district of the new (1984) Grand Kru County, with a few outliers across the river in Maryland County.

Their area coincides more or less with the southern half of Lower Kru Coast District in Grand Kru County. This southern portion of the district is defined in terms of Liberian administrative units as the Garawe/Nemia "clan" (code 180810). Jabo territory extends along the coast of southeastern Liberia from Garraway in the northwest proceeding in a southeasterly direction to the Deeah River, and from there inland almost as far as Bewehn. The northern half of the district is inhabited by the Trembo ethnic group and which has its center at the district capital in Bewehn.

== Population centers ==
=== Names of towns ===
At the level below the administrative clan, the Jabo are organized into administrative townships (each with a "town chief"), usually consisting of multiple clusters of villages or hamlets. Hasselbring & Johnson list seven Jabo town complexes:

- Garaway Beach (Polou)
- Genoyah
- Nemiah (includes: Glopluken, Jlatiken, Mensiengloh, Nyanoken, Penoken, Yaytueken)
- Nyambo
- Piaty
- Poloya (includes: Poloylowen, Pungbaloken, Tuwaken, Weteken)
- Weteken

Since the recent civil war in Liberia, many towns have been emptied, renamed, reclaimed, or swollen by displaced populations.

- Garraway is now called Garraway Beach.
- Half Garraway is now called Yedweke.
- (Upper) Nimiah is now called Wilsonville.

=== Nimiah ===
The Jabo population center most reported in the literature is the town complex of Half Garraway (variants: Half Garroway, Half Gadowe, Half Grawe, New Garraway), known in Jabo as Nimiah, which is situated between Garraway and the Seaside Grebo town of Fishtown (Waa).

Nimiah consists of two main centers: one village cluster on the coastal lagoon, and another, larger cluster located approximately 10 km inland. The town on the lagoon (Lower Nimiah, Nimiah Beach) consists of several centers, of which the principal one is now called Yedweke, at latitude 4°28'48" N (4.48), longitude 7°52'39" W (−7.8775), altitude 83 m (275 ft); population 1724.

Upper Nimiah (Nemiah, Nemia, Nimia) is located at Latitude 4°32'40" N (4.5444), Longitude 7°53'37 W (−7.8936), altitude 101 m (334 feet); population 3688. It is now called Wilsonville.

== Language ==
The Jabo are known for their drum-signalling system, which mirrors to some degree the suprasegmental system of their highly tonal language. The collection of their proverbs and sayings assembled by Herzog and Blooah is often cited in the folkloristic literature. The Jabo language is complex and has been studied by well-known scientific linguists.

== Etymology ==
The term Jabo in a narrow sense means "Ja people", the -bo being an animate plural suffix (compare with ba in ba-ntu). A single member of the group is a Jawe "Ja + person" and the language *Jame "Ja + tongue"(Glebo form [jaoĩ] . The significative element Ja is explained as being the proper name of the eponymous ancestor of the group.

Compare:

[ɡ͡bɔ̏wẹ̀] "Glebo man of Fishtown (Waa) clan"
[ɡ͡bɔ̏bọ̀] "Glebo people of Fishtown (Waa) clan"

== Gweabo ==
The Jabo are also referred to in the literature as the Gweabo. The Jabo form of the name is [ɡwȅȁbọ̀]. This name is also used for them by at least some Glebo speakers as [wèǎo].

The term is not a mere variant of the word Jabo, as might be assumed. It is, rather, defined as the name of "a group of five tribes" or "a language". It properly designates a certain patrilineal descent group (in this case a "sub-tribe"), within the larger group ("Jabo tribe"). It may be conjectured to have as an eponym the common personal name (g)wea.

Gweabo was originally incorrectly generalized to apply to the larger group (the Jabo confederation) because Sapir's Jabo informant was a member of that sub-tribe.

Among the subdivisions of the Gweabo sub-tribe mentioned in Jabo Proverbs from Liberia are:

- [bʱọ̏lọ̀kwẽ̀ẽ]
- [ɡbɔ̏lɔ̀ ɡwlọbo]
- [ɲạbọ́]

== Nimiah ==
Blooah sometimes also claimed to be a member of the "Nimiah tribe;" sometimes Nimiah was called a township. As mentioned above, it corresponds to a Liberian administrative clan. The pronunciation in Jabo which was recorded was [nĩ́w̤i̯ẹ̃].

== Classification ==
Dealing with a people with little recorded history and for which little detailed ethnographic information is available, the most reliable framework for placing them with respect to related peoples is the classification of their language.

Jabo clearly belongs within the Kru family of Niger–Congo languages. For further discussion, see the article Grebo people.

=== Jabo and Grebo ===
A certain amount of confusion is created by the fact that many sources treat "Jabo" as being either identical with, or as a subgroup of Grebo. For a discussion of this see the article Jabo (language).

=== Geographical factors ===
Although the Jabo area is adjacent to the Seaside Grebo area to the east-southeast, the two are separated by the Deeah (Die or Decoris) River, which is often treacherous and difficult to cross, especially during the rainy season or when a strong tide is running in the estuary. Because of the lack of usable roads connecting them, the Jabo tend to go northwest to market, into a Kru-oriented area at the county seat of (Barclayville) and Garraway, north to Bewehn, or sometimes northeast to Plibo, rarely to the commercial and government center in Harper. This tends to emphasize mutual affinity and intercommunication with the Klao (Krao or "Kru Proper"), rather than with the Seaside Grebo. They are also located in the same newly created (1984) county as the Klao (Grand Kru County), unlike the Glebo in Maryland County, from which they are once again politically separated.

== Exogamy ==
A cultural trait present among the Jabo, and apparently widespread across the Kru group is the practice of virilocal exogamy. This is enforced as a taboo at the clan level, but in practice, many also marry outside their tribe. The extent of this practice is obviously limited by the difficult transportation situation. Nonetheless, the exogamy factor has a certain effect of heightening intergroup awareness and communication. It remains to be seen how this will be affected by the refugee situation and urbanization.

== Allegations of ritual murder and cannibalism ==
In researching the literature pertaining to the Jabo, one may occasionally come upon references to them practising cannibalism and Charles Blooah, Sapir's Jabo informant, apparently made no secret of the fact.

Against the backdrop of widespread violence during the Liberian civil war, reports of ritual murder and cannibalism seem scarcely to rise to the level of newsworthiness. Yet the inhabitants of the Cape Palmas region have been repeatedly characterized since at least 1668 as having this practice culturally entrenched among themselves. Considering the practice's links to Liberian internal politics and secret societies (Leopard Men), which cut across all social strata, and considering also a sensational legal proceeding in Maryland county in 1977, there is no reason to hope that the practice or its associated belief system has abated or been extirpated. This is not intended to convey the impression that such practices are limited to this area of Africa alone.

== Bibliography ==
[HDS] Herzog, George. "Drum Signaling in a West African Tribe," Word 1:217-38, 1945. Reprinted in: Language in Culture and Society, pp. 312–23. Ed. Dell Hymes. New York, 1964.

[H&B] Herzog, George, and Charles G. Blooah. Jabo Proverbs from Liberia: Maxims in the Life of a Native Tribe. London, Pub. for the International Institute of African Languages & Cultures by Oxford University Press, H. Milford, 1936.

[ETH] Gordon, Raymond G., Jr., editor. Ethnologue: Languages of the World, Fifteenth edition. Dallas, Tex.: SIL International, 2005. Online version: .

[I&D] Ingemann, Frances, and John Duitsman. "A Survey of Grebo Dialects in Liberia," Liberian Studies Journal, 7(2):121–131, 1976.

[JHG] Greenberg, Joseph H., The Languages of Africa. Indiana Univ. Press, 1966).

[H&J] Hasselbring, Sue and Eric Johnson. A sociolinguistic survey of the Grebo language area of Liberia. SIL Electronic Survey Reports 2002-074, 2002. Online version: .

[SNG] Sapir, Edward. "Notes on the Gweabo Language of Liberia," Language, 7:30–41, 1931.

[S&B] Sapir, Edward, With Charles G. Blooah. "Some Gweabo Proverbs," Africa, 2:183–185, 1929.

[NST] Trubetskoy, Nikolai S. Grundzüge der Phonologie. (Principles of Phonology). Travaux du Cercle Linguistique de Prague, 7). Prague, 1939.

[WPA] WPA Federal Writers' Project. Life History Manuscripts from the Folklore Project, 1936–1940. Online version: Library of Congress American Life Histories: Manuscripts from the Federal Writers' Project, 1936 – 1940, Item 27 of 312 (Nebraska), "Charles Blooah" .
