= Jabo, Nigeria =

Village in Niger State, Nigeria

Jabo
- Village
- Location in Nigeria
- Coordinates: 9°25′45″N 6°41′30″E
- Country: Nigeria
- State: Niger State

Population
  - Total: 8,344 (approx. for 7km radius)
- Time zone: UTC+1 (WAT)

Jabo is a village in Niger State, Nigeria, situated on the A124 highway. It is located a few miles south of the state capital, Minna.

== Geography and amenities ==
Neighboring settlements include Paiko and Gida.

The village is situated near the Kwanti and Pinai Nature Reserves and is within proximity to the Federal University of Technology Minna.
