= Bassa =

Bassa may refer to:

== People ==
- Bassa people (Cameroon)
  - Basaa language, a member of the Bantu languages family
- Bassa people (Liberia)
  - Bassa language, a member of the Kru languages family
  - Bassa script
- Jeffrey Bassa (born 2002), American football player
- Sabirou Bassa-Djeri (1987–2025), Togolese football player

== Places ==
- Bassa, Chamba, village in India
- Bassa, Kogi State, Nigeria
- Bassa, Plateau State, Nigeria
- Bassa Cove colony, now Buchanan, Liberia
- al-Bassa, a destroyed Palestinian village, currently located in northern Israel
- Cahora Bassa, an artificial lake in Mozambique
- Grand Bassa County, Liberia
- Another name for Basse Santa Su, Gambia

== Other uses ==
- British Airlines Stewards and Stewardesses Association, a union exclusively for British Airways cabin crew
- Bassa Sports Club, an association football team in Antigua and Barbuda

== See also ==
- Basa (disambiguation)
