= Basa =

Basa may refer to:

== Agreements ==
- Bilateral Aviation Safety Agreement, between National Aviation Authority regulators

== People ==
- Basa (surname)
- Bassa people (Cameroon), also spelled Basa, an ethnic group
- Basa, leader and namesake of the Basingas, an Anglo-Saxon tribe

== Languages ==
- Basaa language, also spelled Basa, a Bantu language spoken in Cameroon
- Basa languages, a cluster of Kainji languages spoken in Nigeria

== Places ==
- Basa River, Romania
- Basa, Nepal, a village development committee
- Basa, Sudan, a village
- Basa Air Base, Floridablanca, Pampanga, Philippines
- Barrow Arts and Sciences Academy, high school in Barrow County, Georgia

== Organizations ==
- British Atomic Scientists Association, founded in 1946
- Black and Asian Studies Association, set up in London in 1991
- BASA Film, the Afghanistan cinema club

== Other uses ==
- Basa (fish), a type of catfish
- Basa (cicada)

== See also ==
- BASA-press (1992–2009), the oldest independent news agency in Moldova
- Bassa (disambiguation)
- Bhāṣā, the word for "language" in many Asian languages
