= Madurai International Airport =

Airport in Madurai, India

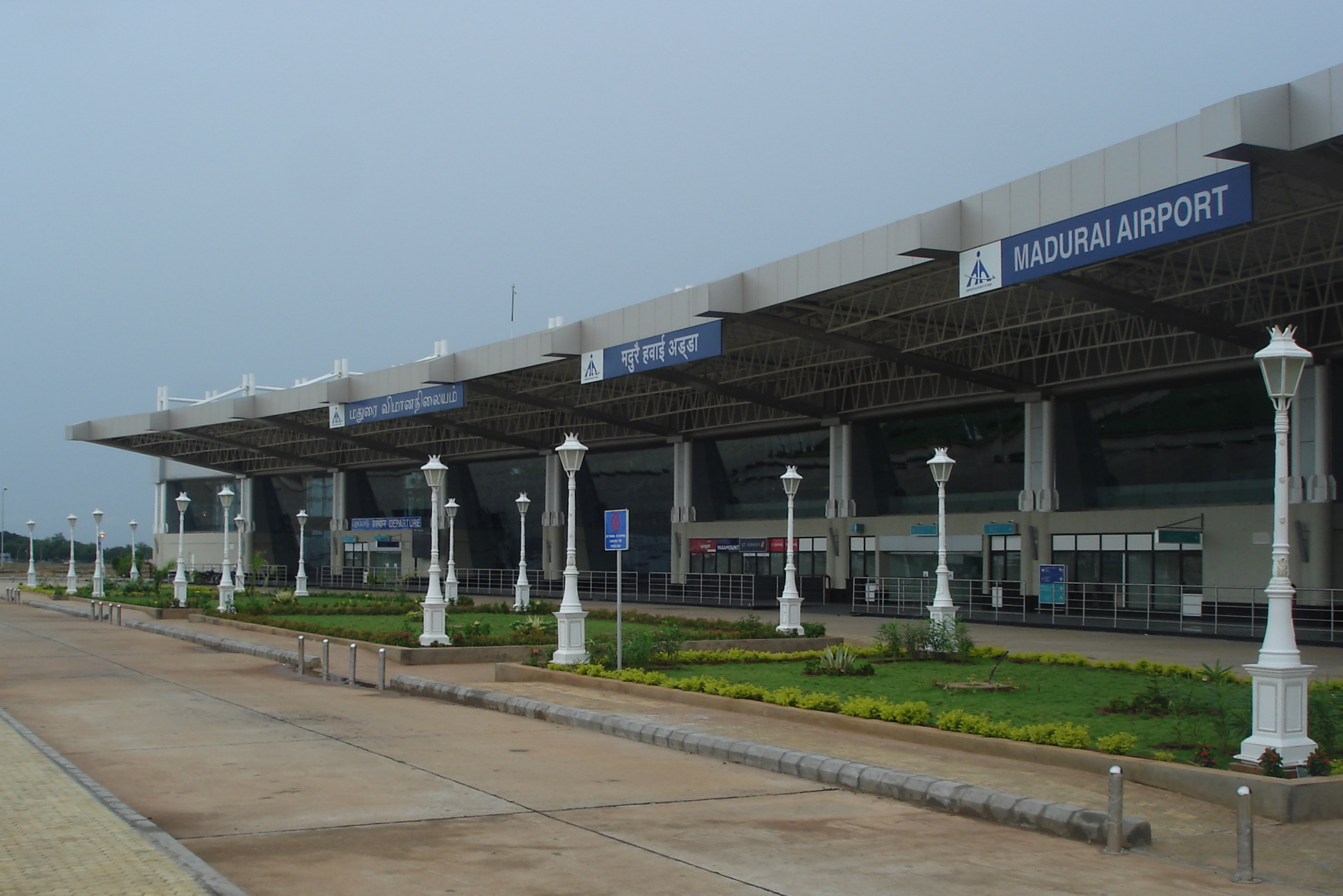
- IATA: IXM; ICAO: VOMD

Summary
- Airport type: Public
- Owner: Ministry of Civil Aviation
- Operator: Airports Authority of India
- Serves: Madurai metropolitan area
- Location: Madurai, Tamil Nadu, India
- Opened: 1942; 84 years ago
- Elevation AMSL: 136 m (446 ft)
- Coordinates: 09°50′01″N 078°05′22″E
- Website: aai.aero/en/airports/madurai

Map
- Location of airport in Tamil Nadu IXM (India)

Runways
Direction	Length		Surface
Direction	m	ft	Surface
09/27	2,285	7,497	Asphalt

Statistics (April 2025 - March 2026)
- Passengers: 13,88,062 (▼0.8%)
- Aircraft movements: 13,105 (▼3%)
- Cargo tonnage: 4,444.4 (▲27.2%)
- Source: Airports Authority of India

Madurai International Airport (IATA: IXM, ICAO: VOMD) is an international airport in Madurai, Tamil Nadu, India. It is the fourth busiest airport by passenger traffic in the state after Chennai, Coimbatore, and Tiruchirappalli airports. The airport is located about 12 km (7.5 mi) south of the city centre. As of January 2026, four airlines operate commercial services from the airport to eight destinations including three international destinations.

The airport was established as an airfield for the Royal Air Force in 1942 during the Second World War, and was later used for cargo operations. After the Indian independence, the airport opened in 1952 with commercial passenger flights resuming soon after. The runway was extended in the 1980s to handle larger narrow body aircraft. It saw limited domestic operations till the 2000s.

The airport went through a modernisation programme in the late 2000s, with a new passenger terminal was opened in 2010. It was notified as a customs airport, with permission for limited international flights in 2011, and international services started in 2012. The old passenger terminal was converted to a cargo terminal and cargo operations at the airport began in December 2017. On 10 March 2026, the union cabinet approved the proposal to designate the airport as an international airport. The airport has a single runway, equipped with an Cat I Instrument Landing System, and seven parking bays.

== History ==
An airfield was established at Madurai by the Royal Air Force during the Second World War in 1942. After the war, the airstrip was used to ferry mail and newspapers. After the Indian independence, the airport was revived, and was opened as a domestic airport in 1952. The first passenger flight operated from Madras to Trivandrum via Madurai using a Fokker Friendship aircraft in 1956. Flights operated from the airport to Colombo in the early 1960s. In the mid-1970s, the runway was strengthened and extended to handle larger narrow body aircraft, with Indian Airlines operating Boeing 737 aircraft to the airport soon after. In the 1980s, Indian Airlines started operating regular flights to Bangalore using Hawker Siddeley HS 748 aircraft, and later Vayudoot operated flights from Madurai to Madras, Coimbatore, and Trichy.

In the 1990s, the airport saw a number of companies operate flight services from the airport. East-West Airlines operated services to Bombay and Trivandrum from 1992 to 1996. In the mid-1990s, briefly, Indian Airlines was the only carrier operating from the airport, with services to Madras. NEPC Airlines launched daily flight services from Madurai to Madras and Trichy briefly, before it shut down in 1997, and later Indian Airlines extended its Madras service to Bombay. Jet Airways began operations in the late 1990s with connections from Madurai to Bombay initially and Madras later. In the mid-2000s, Simplifly Deccan and Paramount Airways operated flights to Bangalore and Chennai, respectively. However, both the airlines wound up operations during the Great Recession in the late 2000s.

In the late 2000s, the airport was selected to be modernised as a part of a plan by Airports Authority of India (AAI) to upgrade 35 Indian non-metro airports, and a new passenger terminal was opened in September 2010. Later that year, SpiceJet started services to Chennai, Delhi, and Mumbai with Hyderabad added later. On 31 December 2011 The airport was notified as customs airport, which enabled the airport to handle limited international operations and it came into effect from 1 January 2012. Two chartered flights from Malaysia landed at the airport on 25 August 2012, making them the first international aircraft to land at the airport after the declaration. The first commercial international flight began on 20 September 2012 with SpiceJet operating a maiden service to Colombo. On 28 May 2013, the Government of India permitted cargo operations at the airport, which became operational from 15 December 2017. IndiGo launched operations from the airport in March 2017 with a maiden service to Delhi via Chennai. On 17 October 2018, visa on arrival facility was introduced for passengers traveling from select countries. On 10 March 2026, the union cabinet approved the proposal to designate the airport as an international airport.

== Infrastructure ==
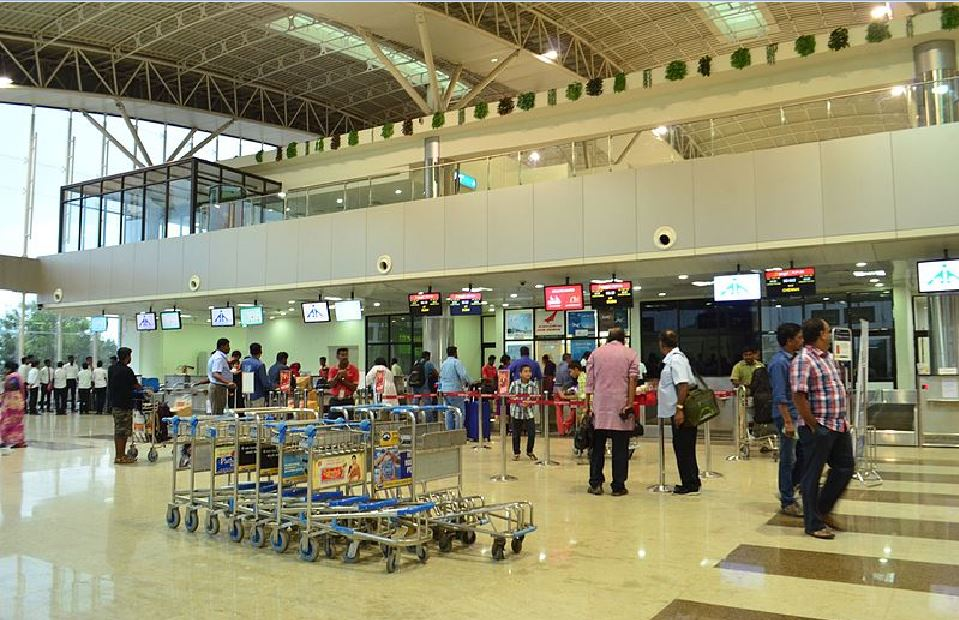
Check-in counters at the airport

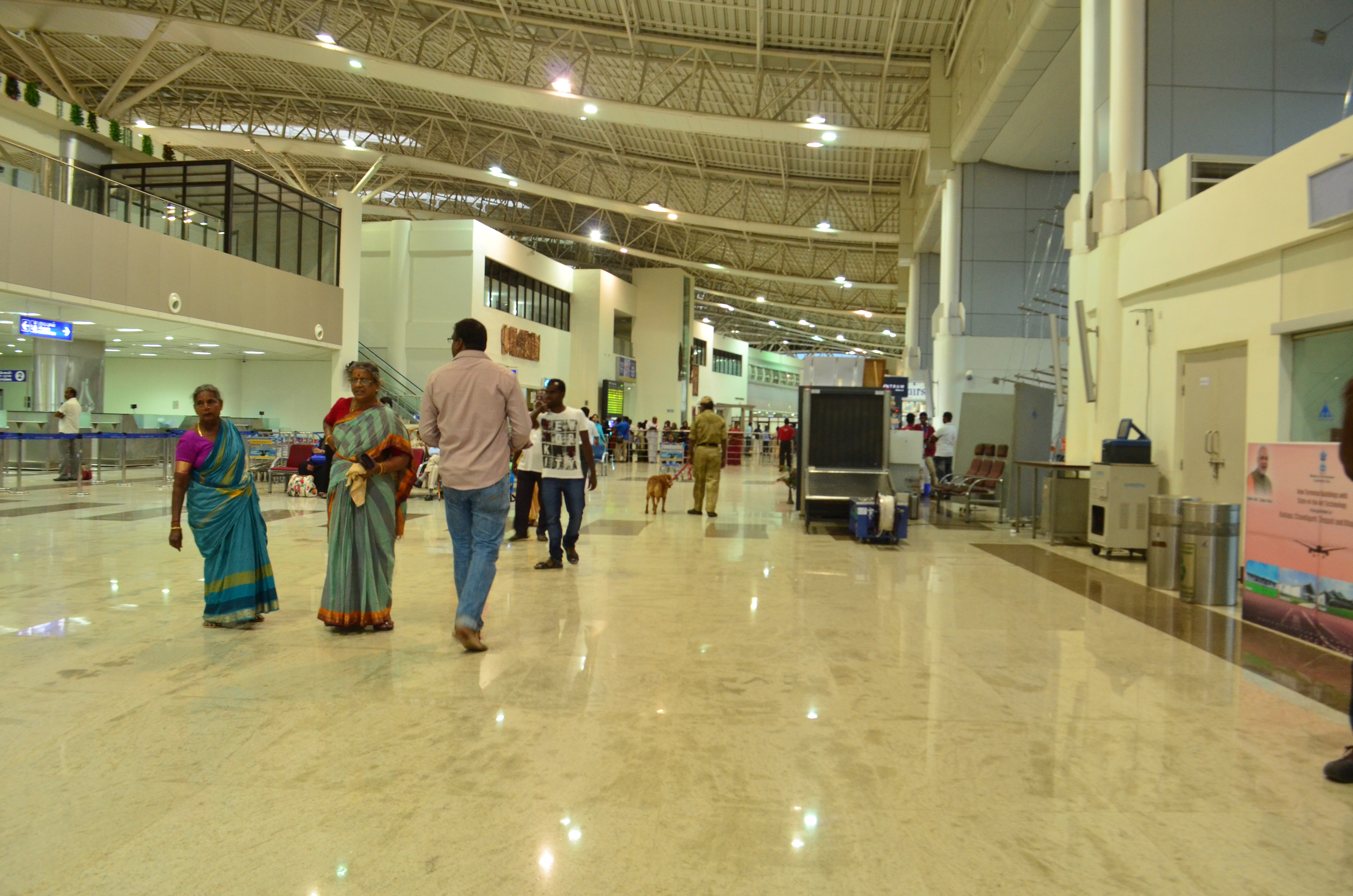
Interior of the airport

The airport has a single 2,285 m (7,497 ft) long runway equipped with Cat-I Instrument Landing System. There are two parallel taxiways adjacent to the runway. The airport has seven parking bays including two stands equipped with jet bridges.

=== Terminals ===
The airport has two adjacent terminals, the integrated passenger terminal which was inaugurated on 12 September 2010, and the old passenger terminal which was recommissioned as a cargo terminal. The new passenger terminal was built as a part of a plan to upgrade the airport in the late 2000s. The terminal is spread over an area of 17,600 m^{2} (189,000 sq ft) and has a capacity to handle about 500 passengers per hour. The terminal houses 36 check-in counters, 20 immigration counters, two security counters, two baggage scanners, and four baggage conveyors. There are two lounges–a VIP lounge managed by AAI and a Commercial Important Persons lounge managed by Tamil Nadu Chamber of Commerce and Industry.

Following the inauguration of the new passenger terminal, the Government of India announced plans to convert the old terminal to handle cargo operations in 2013. The refurbished cargo terminal was opened on 28 November 2017. The airport parking area has the capacity to park 375 cars and 10 buses.

=== Future plans ===
As a part of the modernisation plan in the late 2000s, plans were made for the construction of additional terminal buildings, and a new Air Traffic Control tower, and expansion of the runway. About 610 acres (250 ha) of land is required for the planned expansion and extension of the runway to 12,500 ft (3,800 m) to enable it to handle wide body aircraft. However, problems with land acquisition has resulted in delays in the proposed expansion plan.

== Airlines and destinations ==
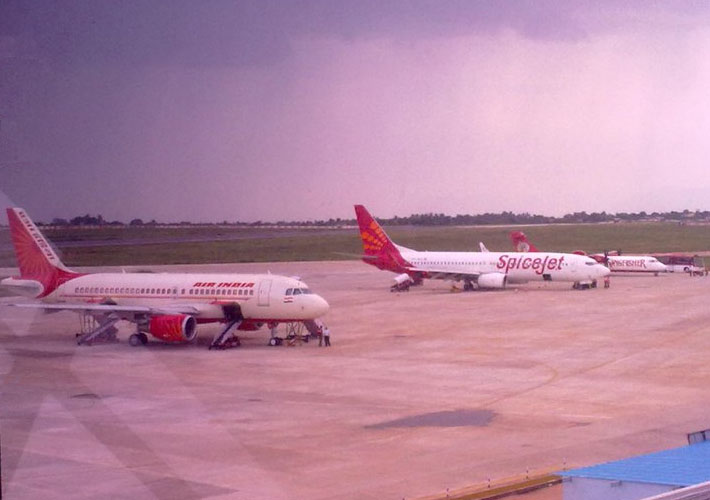
Apron area of the airport

As of January 2026, four airlines operate commercial services from the airport to eight destinations including three international destinations. While there are demands for additional international flights from Madurai, the airport is allowed to handle only limited international flights and as it is not part of the Bilateral aviation safety agreement, international air carriers have shown reluctance for operating flights from the airport.

Airlines	Destinations
Air India	Chennai, Mumbai–Shivaji
Air India Express	Bengaluru, Chennai
IndiGo	Abu Dhabi, Bengaluru, Chennai, Delhi, Hyderabad, Navi Mumbai
SpiceJet	Chennai, Dubai–International
SriLankan Airlines	Colombo–Bandaranaike

== Incidents and accidents ==
On 9 December 1971, an Avro 748 (registered VT-DXG), arriving from Trivandrum, crashed in to Meghamalai hills, while descending into the airport. The accident occurred in reduced visibility, and resulted in the deaths of all four crew members and 17 of the 27 passengers on board.
