= Crew rest compartment =

Area of an airplane where crew members can rest in private

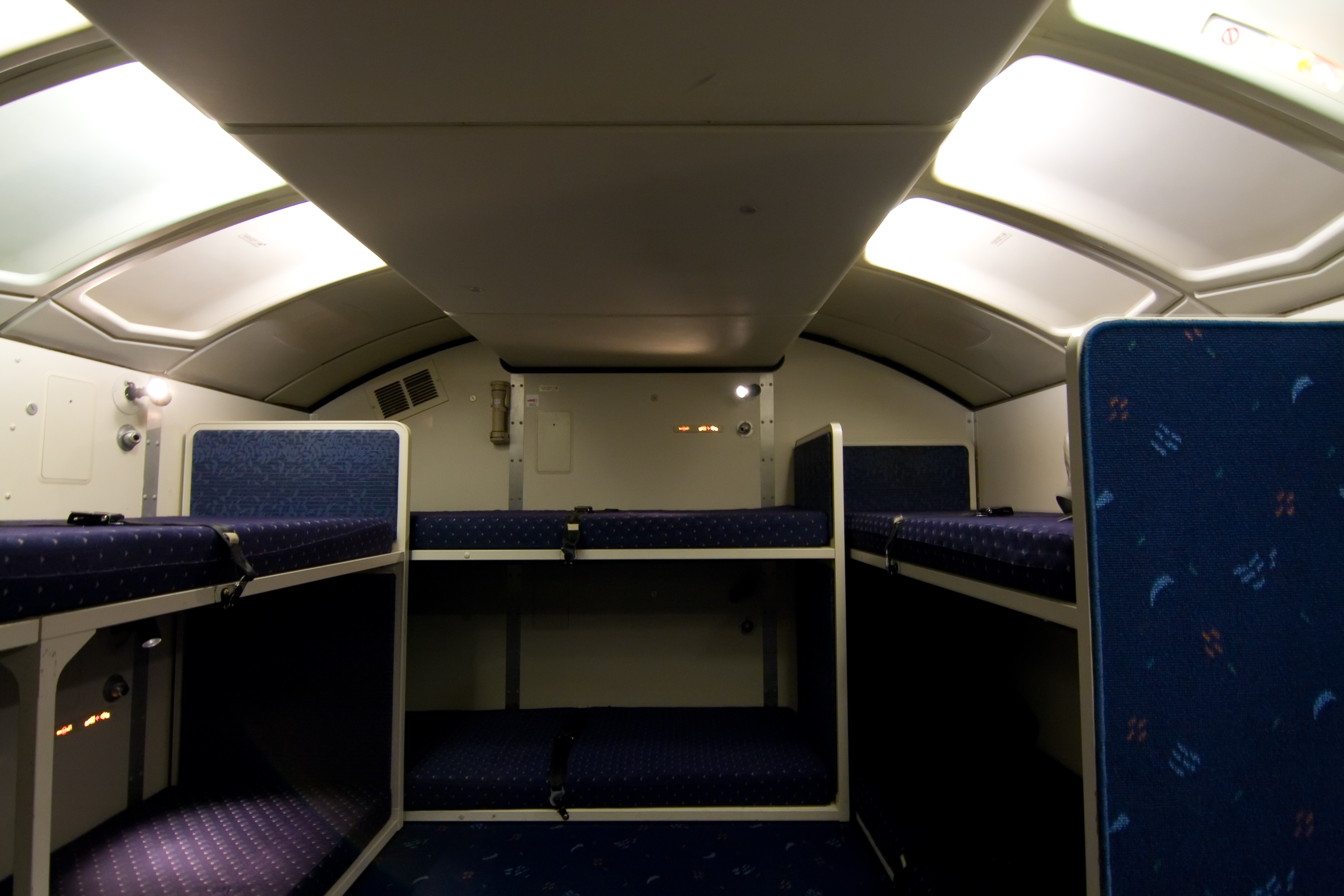
A multiple-bunk Class 1 crew rest compartment.

A crew rest compartment is a section of an airliner dedicated for breaks and sleeping by crew members during off-duty periods. Federal Aviation Regulations have provisions requiring crew rest areas be provided in order to operate a long-haul flight by using multiple crew shifts.

Passengers are restricted from accessing crew rest compartments by regulations; their entrances may be secured by locks and may require using a ladder for access. Crew rest compartments are normally segregated, with separate compartments for the flight deck crew and the cabin crew.

Many crew rest compartments may not normally be used during taxi, takeoff, or landing maneuvers unless equipped with a standard seat.

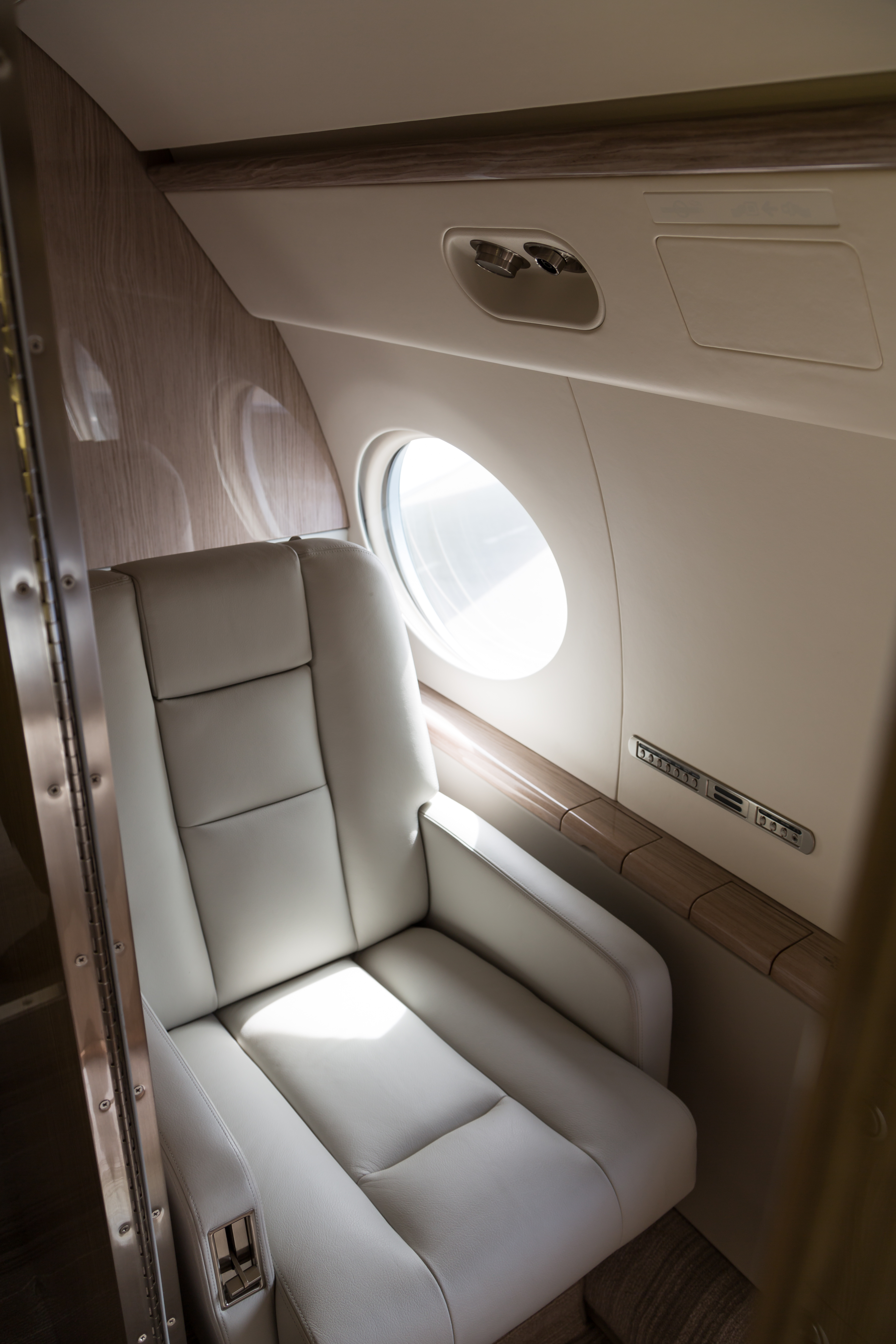
Crew rest aboard a Gulfstream G550

In the United States, the Federal Aviation Administration (FAA) defines three classes of crew rest facilities, dependent on the number of crew and the duration of the flight. Crew rest periods may be provided in higher classed rest areas than required.

The FAA rest facility classifications from highest to lowest:

- Class 1 rest facility: This class requires access to an area physically separated from the cockpit and the passenger cabin; contain bunks or other flat areas for sleeping; have provisions for sound and lighting isolation.
- Class 2 rest facility: This class requires access to at least a lie flat seat and separation from passengers by a curtain.
- Class 3 rest facility: This class only requires a cabin seat that is able to recline and has foot support.

Crew rest design and safety considerations are similar between international regulators, for example the European Aviation Safety Agency (EASA) regulations for access control, communications, and signage are similar to those of the FAA's. By following such regulatory Bilateral Aviation Safety Agreements (which avoid contradictory minimum specifications), aircraft manufacturers can design crew rests to meet the requirements in many markets.
