= Al-Bassa massacre =

1938 event of the Arab Revolt in Palestine

al-Bassa massacre
- Part of the 1936–1939 Arab revolt in Palestine and British colonialism
- Al-Bassa massacre (Mandatory Palestine)
- Location: 33°04′39″N 35°08′39″E al-Bassa, Mandatory Palestine
- Date: 7 September 1938; 88 years ago
- Target: Palestinians
- Attack type: Torture, Indiscriminate attack and Land mines
- Deaths: 20 Palestinian civilians (confirmed), 50-100 Palestinian civilians (estimated)
- Perpetrators: Mandatory Palestine: Royal Ulster Rifles; 11th Hussars
- Motive: Nearby roadside mine that killed 2 British soldiers

The al-Bassa massacre was an incident that took place on September 6, 1938, in the Palestinian village of al-Bassa, during the Palestinian Revolt (1936–1939) against British rule. British forces carried out a violent attack, leading to significant casualties and the destruction of property in the village. The massacre exemplified the harsh tactics used by the British to suppress the Arab nationalist uprising in Mandatory Palestine and remains a prominent event in Palestinian historical memory.

== Background ==
The al-Bassa Massacre occurred during a period of heightened tensions within Mandatory Palestine. which was under British control following World War I. By the 1930s, many Palestinians were actively resisting British rule and opposing the large-scale immigration of Jewish settlers. The Arab Revolt sought to end British administration and the influx of Jewish settlers, sparking widespread conflict across the region.

As part of their response, British authorities implemented stringent security measures and reprisal actions to quell the uprising. These included home demolitions, curfews, mass arrests, and military operations aimed at suppressing local resistance. Villages suspected of supporting the revolt, like al-Bassa, often bore the brunt of these actions.

On the night of September 6, 1938, two members of the Royal Ulster Rifles (RUR) were killed by a roadside mine, prompting British forces to retaliate against the nearby village of al-Bassa, despite its inhabitants having no direct involvement in the attack. The RUR, recently deployed to Palestine to suppress the revolt, were motivated by a policy of punitive measures against villages and innocent civilians perceived as threats.

== Events of the massacre ==
On the morning of September 7, 1938, British military forces, consisting of a company from the Royal Ulster Rifles (RUR) and armored units from the 11th Hussars, entered the Palestinian village of al-Bassa, located near Acre in north-west Galilee.

Upon arrival, the British troops engaged in a sustained period of machine gun fire that lasted approximately 20 minutes against the civilian population. Following the gunfire, the soldiers proceeded to set fire to multiple structures within the village. Sometimes with the inhabitants still inside, resulting in widespread destruction. By the end of the operation, al-Bassa had been completely devastated. Reports indicate that approximately 100 residents from al-Bassa were subsequently taken to a nearby Army camp, where four individuals were subjected to torture in front of the others, who were forced to witness it.

In a separate action on the same day, soldiers detained about 50 men from the village and forced them onto a bus, which they subsequently drove and detonated over a mine, leading to significant casualties among those aboard. Those who tried to run away prior to stepping on the bus were shot dead. This operation primarily affected civilians, as the men were taken randomly from their homes and had no involvement in the prior attack.

After the initial assault, surviving villagers were forced to bury the deceased in hastily dug graves by British forces.

The events at al-Bassa were part of a wider policy of reprisals implemented by British authorities during the Arab Revolt. This strategy involved various forms of collective punishment against Palestinian communities. Following the incident, there were no formal investigations or accountability measures taken against the British forces involved, which reflected the broader context of colonial military operations during this period.

=== Description of events by a RUR soldier ===
Desmond Woods, an officer of the Royal Ulster Rifles, described the massacre at al-Bassa as follows:

Now I will never forget this incident ... We were at al-Malikiyya, the other frontier base and word came through about 6 o'clock in the morning that one of our patrols had been blown up and Millie Law [the dead officer] had been killed. Now Gerald Whitfeld [Lieutenant-Colonel G.H.P. Whitfeld, the battalion commander] had told these mukhtars that if any of this sort of thing happened he would take punitive measures against the nearest village to the scene of the mine. Well the nearest village to the scene of the mine was a place called al-Bassa and our Company C were ordered to take part in punitive measures. And I will never forget arriving at al-Bassa and seeing the Rolls-Royce armoured cars of the 11th Hussars peppering Bassa with machine gun fire and this went on for about 20 minutes and then we went in and I remembered we had lighted braziers and we set the houses on fire and we burnt the village to the ground ... Monty had him [the battalion commander] up and he asked him all about it and Gerald Whitfeld explained to him. He said "Sir, I have warned the mukhtars in these villages that if this happened to any of my officers or men, I would take punitive measures against them and I did this and I would've lost control of the frontier if I hadn't." Monty said "All right but just go a wee bit easier in the future."
