= Kateb University =

Private university in Kabul, Afghanistan

- دانشگاه کاتب
- Type: Private
- Established: 2007
- Location: Kabul, Kabul Province, Afghanistan
- Website: kateb.edu.af

Kateb University (Dari: دانشگاه کاتب) is a private university established in 2007, located in the city of Kabul, Afghanistan.

== Faculties ==
The Kateb University having the following faculties:

- Faculty of Law
- Faculty of Engineering
- Faculty of Political Science
- Faculty of Economics
- Faculty of Medicine
- Faculty of Education Management
- Faculty of Sociology
- Faculty of Computer Science

== Notable alumni ==
- Samira Asghari
- Khushnood Nabizada
- Malek Shafi'i
