= Malek Shafi'i =

Afghan filmmaker and festival organizer (born 1974)

Malek Shafi'i ملک شفیعی
- Born: Abdul Malek; Qarabagh, Ghazni Province, Afghanistan
- Occupations: Filmmaker, festival organizer
- Employer: BASA Film
- Board member of: Board of Directors Burnaby Art Council, 2013-2016, Board of Imm Art
- Website: www.basafilm.com

Malek Shafi’i (ملک شفیعی, born 1974) is an Afghan film director, producer, festival organizer, and human rights activist. He is the founder and executive director of the Afghanistan International Human Rights Film Festival (AIHRFF). Based in Kabul, he has also worked extensively abroad.

== Education ==
Shafi’i completed his early education in film making at the Baagh Ferdaws Filmmaking Center in Tehran and sociology studies at Kateb University in Kabul. He also attended film production and arts management courses in the Netherlands and the United States.

== Biography ==
After 20 years of exile, Malek returned to Afghanistan in 2006 and founded Bashgahe Cinema ("Afghanistan Cinema Club"), a nonprofit organization promoting cultural development in Afghanistan.

He organized the second and third Kabul International Documentary and Short Film Festivals in 2007 and 2008, and the Second Take Film Festival in 2008, focused on the intersection of gender, cinema and society in Afghanistan.

Malek has also worked as a senior media and communication advisor for Radio Television Afghanistan (RTA), working with non-governmental and international organizations as well as with the United Nations in Afghanistan, implementing film and media projects to promote the Universal Declaration of Human Rights. He has directed and produced more than 30 films,, some of which were awarded at international film festivals. Shafi'i was a jury member at the Tolo TV and Film Festival, Kabul Film Festival, and Amnesty Award of CPH-DOX, ADB (Asian Development Bank) My View video competition, and a category judge at the Banff Mountain Film Festival.

In 2011, Malek collaborated with Afghan documentary film-maker and human rights activist Diana Saqeb and multimedia producer and arts director Hassan Zakizadeh to launch the first edition of the Afghanistan Human Rights Film Festival in Kabul.

== Selected filmography ==
Since 1999, Shafi'i has made more than 30 documentary and short fiction films, including:

- 2012 - Bamyan the Land of Wonders (25 minutes), documentary for the Aga Khan Foundation (AKF)
- 2009 - Savings Groups (20 minutes), documentary for AKF
- 2008 - Social Audit (20 minutes), documentary for AKF
- 2007 - Self Helping Group (15 minutes), documentary for UN HABITAT
- 2007 - Up to the Parliament (40 minutes), documentary about the campaign and political challenges of three female candidates in the first Afghanistan parliamentary election
- 2005 - Pamir Territory (38 minutes), documentary about the Ismaili minority of Pamir, Afghanistan
- 2005 - Drought in Hazarajat (30 minutes), documentary about drought in the Central Highland region of Afghanistan
- 2004 - End of the Earth (40 minutes), documentary about September 11 and Afghan refugees in European countries
- 2004 - Brown Package (short fiction, 32 minutes), as cinematographer, working with director Sohaila Jawaheri
- 2003 - Kite (short fiction, 22 minutes), as cinematographer, working with director Razi Mohebi

Documentary series

- 1999 - Rewayat-e ‒ Hejr (5 episodes, 15 minutes), Iran - About illegal Afghan refugees in Iran
- 2000 - Charaqhaye Rabeta (5 episodes, 25 minutes), Iran - Biographies of selected Afghan poets, writers, activists and scientists who live in Iran
- 2003 - Afghanistan, Heart of Asia (9 episodes, 25 minutes), Afghanistan - An investigative reporting documentary series on the seven provinces of Afghanistan after the fall of the Taliban
- 2007 - Small City Great Expectations (6 episodes, 25 minutes), Afghanistan - A research documentary series on Afghanistan six years after the fall of the Taliban

Documentary collaborations

- 2012 - Mohtarama (HD documentary, 60 minutes) - About Shia Family Law and the troubles of women in Afghanistan, including the lack of political and social rights, domestic violence, troubled married lives, and street harassment; co-directed with Diana Saqab.
- 2010 - These Three Women (documentary, 20 minutes) - About three female activists of the Independent Administrative Reform and Civil Service Commission of Afghanistan; co-directed with Diana Saqab.
- 2009 - Run Roobina Run (documentary, DV CAM, 55 minutes) - About Roobina Moqimyar, the first Afghan athlete in the Olympic Games. Shot during the Beijing Olympic Games.
- 2007 - Twenty Five Percent (documentary, DV CAM, 37 minutes) - About the six female Afghan Members of Parliament, their private lives as wives, mothers and daughters, and their attempts to serve society both within and outside of Parliament, in a traditional and male-dominated environment; co-directed with Diana Saqab.

== Awards ==
- 2006 - Best film (Athatha), Kabul International Film Festival
- Best Non-fiction Film Prize for Pamir Territory MFMK
- Best Non-fiction Film Prize for End of the Earth from Kabul Film Festival First

== Jury memberships ==
- 2017 - A Mater of Act Movies That Matter Film Festival Jury
- 2013-2016 - Burnaby Film Forum
- 2011 - Asian Development Bank Video Competition Judge
- 2008 - Amnesty Award Jury Member of (CPH:Dox), Copenhagen International Documentary Film Festival CPH:DOX 2008
- 2008-2011 - Category judge at BANFF Mountain Film Festival, Banff, Alberta, Canada
- 2007 - Jury Member of 2nd International Documentary and Short Film Festival, Kabul
- 2006‒2009 Jury Member of Tolo TV Film Festival
- 2005 - Jury Member of Ayina Film Festival, Kabul
