= Betzet =

Town in northern Israel

Betzet: בֶּצֶת (Hebrew)
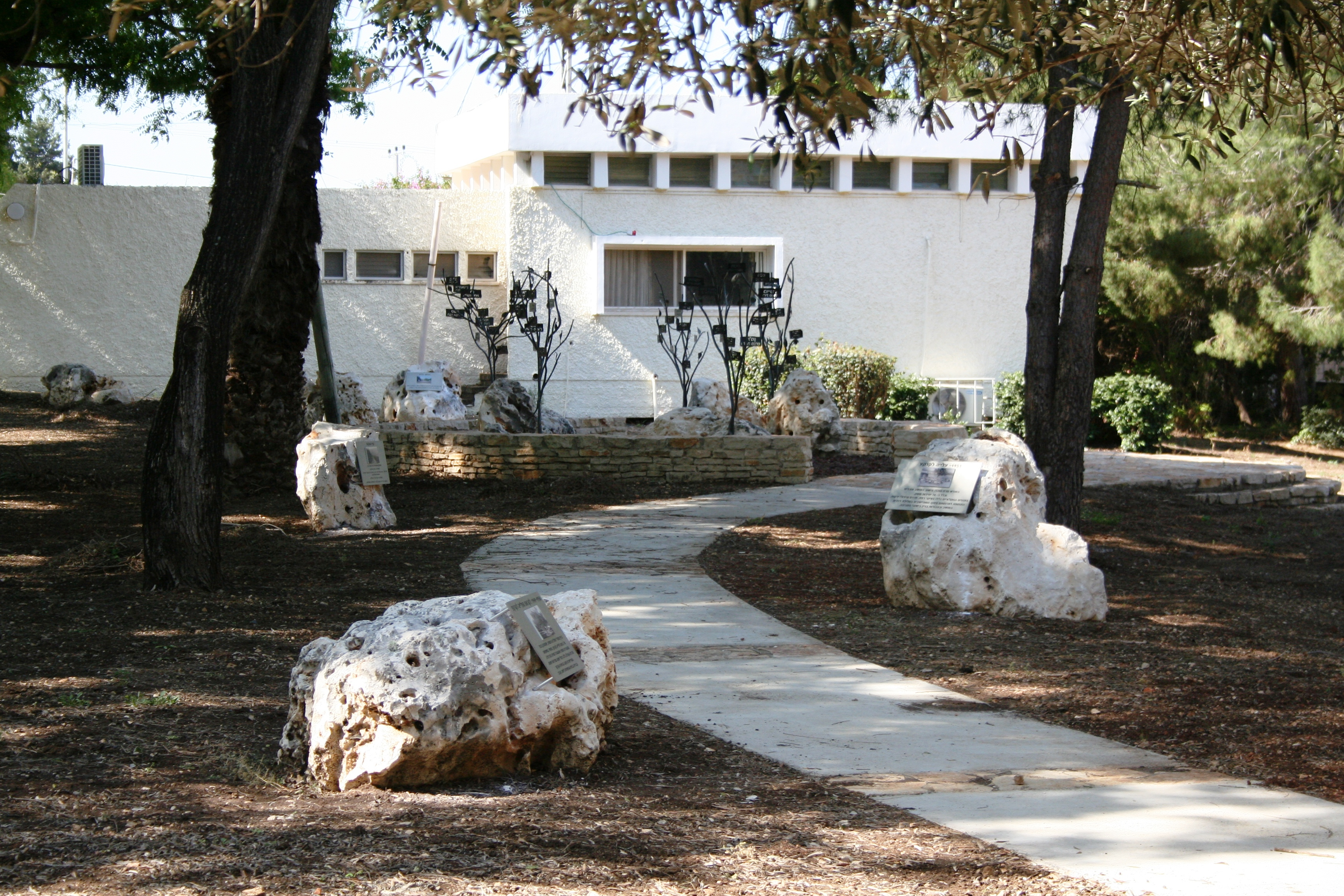

- Location within Northwest Israel Location within Israel
- Coordinates: 33°4′15″N 35°8′9″E
- Country: Israel
- District: Northern
- Subdistrict: Acre
- Council: Mateh Asher
- Affiliation: Moshavim Movement
- Founded: 1951
- Founder: Yugoslav and Romanian Jews
- Population (2024): 617

Betzet (Hebrew: בֶּצֶת) is a town in the Western Galilee in northern Israel. Located near Shlomi and Nahariya, it falls under the jurisdiction of Mateh Asher Regional Council. As of 2024 its population was 617.

== History ==
=== Antiquity ===
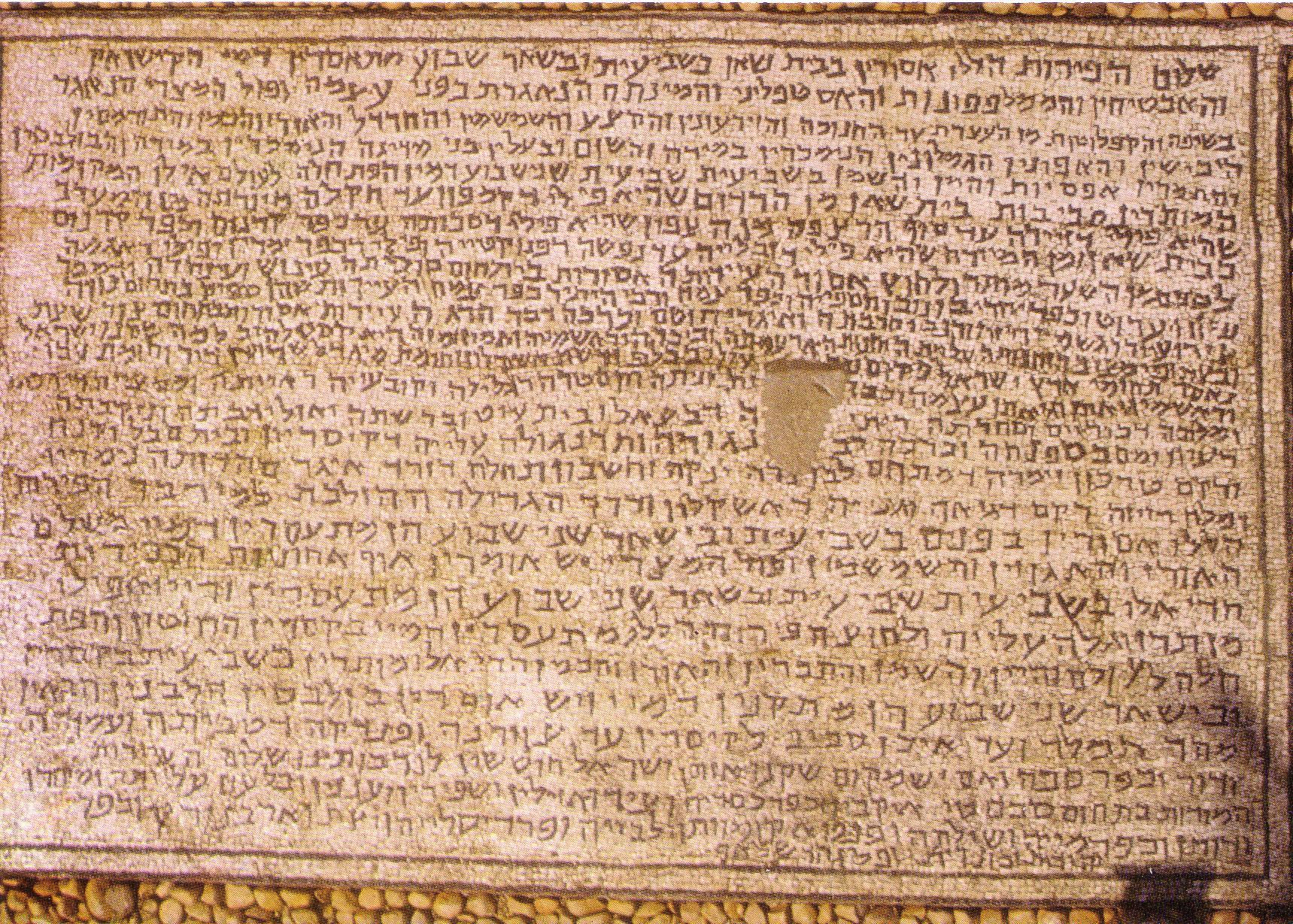
Mosaic of Rehob

Betzet is known in historical records as one of several places along the route to Tyre where produce transported from the Land of Israel was often sold in the local marketplaces, mentioned as such in the Tosefta (Shevi'it 4:8-ff.) and in the 3rd century Mosaic of Rehob. Betzet is listed in the Tosefta and the Jerusalem Talmud as subject to the laws of Shmita.

=== State of Israel ===
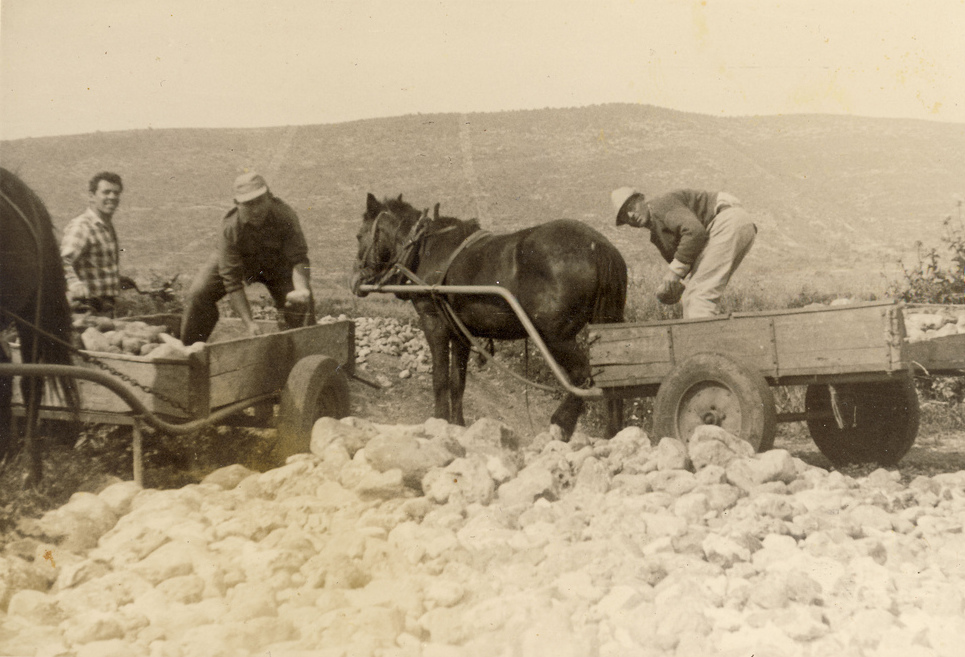
Building the road to Betzet, 1950s

Moshav Betzet was founded in 1951 on land near the former Palestinian village al-Bassa, which was depopulated during the 1948 Arab–Israeli War. The founders were immigrants to Israel from the Balkan states, especially Yugoslavia and Romania. The community retains the name of the ancient village of Betzet, which is estimated to have existed nearby.

On 12 August 1968, two Syrian MiG-17F aircraft landed at Betzet by mistake. The aircraft would go on to serve in the US Defense Intelligence Agency project HAVE DRILL.

=== 2023 war ===
During the Gaza war, northern Israeli border communities, including Betzet, faced targeted attacks by Hezbollah and Palestinian factions based in Lebanon, and were evacuated.

== Landmarks ==
Tel Betzet (Tel means "hill" or "archaeological site") is located south of the village. It has pottery vessels from the Copper Age and the middle Canaanite period. Likewise wine-pressing holes and graves from the Roman and Byzantine imperial eras are preserved.

Betzet Aerodrome, a disused World War II British aerodrome, is located to the west of Betzet. A helipad has been built on the north-western part of the runway by the Israeli Air Force. There are numerous derelict structures from the British era on site; they include AA gun mounts, hardened aircraft shelters, and hangars. The aerodrome grounds are used today as agricultural land and contain banana, olive and pomegranate groves. The Israeli Air Force uses the helipad occasionally and the local radio control flying model club has its activity on the helipad on weekends.

== Economy ==
The area is about 2,200 dunams (approx. 1,743 acnuas). Most of the residents work in farming bananas, avocadoes and turkeys.
