= Bassa Vah (Unicode block) =

- Range: U+16AD0..U+16AFF (48 code points)
- Plane: SMP
- Scripts: Bassa Vah
- Major alphabets: Bassa
- Assigned: 36 code points
- Unused: 12 reserved code points

Unicode version history
- 7.0 (2014): 36 (+36)

Unicode documentation
- Code chart ∣ Web page

Bassa Vah is a Unicode block containing characters of the Bassa Vah alphabet which were historically used for writing the Bassa language of Liberia and Sierra Leone.

Bassa Vah^{[1]}^{[2]} Official Unicode Consortium code chart (PDF)
	0	1	2	3	4	5	6	7	8	9	A	B	C	D	E	F
U+16ADx	𖫐	𖫑	𖫒	𖫓	𖫔	𖫕	𖫖	𖫗	𖫘	𖫙	𖫚	𖫛	𖫜	𖫝	𖫞	𖫟
U+16AEx	𖫠	𖫡	𖫢	𖫣	𖫤	𖫥	𖫦	𖫧	𖫨	𖫩	𖫪	𖫫	𖫬	𖫭		
U+16AFx	𖫰	𖫱	𖫲	𖫳	𖫴	𖫵										
Notes: 1. As of Unicode version 17.0; 2. Grey areas indicate non-assigned code points

== History ==
The following Unicode-related documents record the purpose and process of defining specific characters in the Bassa Vah block:

Version	Final code points (Note: Proposed code points and characters names may differ from final code points and names)	Count	L2 ID	WG2 ID	Document
7.0	U+16AD0..16AED, 16AF0..16AF5	36	L2/09-327		Riley, Charles (2009-03-20), Encoding of the Bassa Vah script in the UCS
7.0	U+16AD0..16AED, 16AF0..16AF5	36	L2/10-030	N3760	Everson, Michael (2010-01-26), Preliminary proposal for encoding the Bassa Vah script in the SMP of the UCS
7.0	U+16AD0..16AED, 16AF0..16AF5	36	L2/10-170	N3839	Everson, Michael; Riley, Charles (2010-05-08), Proposal for encoding the Bassa Vah script in the SMP of the UCS
7.0	U+16AD0..16AED, 16AF0..16AF5	36	L2/10-217	N3847	Everson, Michael (2010-07-31), Revised proposal for encoding the Bassa Vah script in the SMP of the UCS
7.0	U+16AD0..16AED, 16AF0..16AF5	36	L2/10-382R	N3941R	Everson, Michael (2010-10-06), Final proposal for encoding the Bassa Vah script in the SMP of the UCS
7.0	U+16AD0..16AED, 16AF0..16AF5	36	L2/10-416R		Moore, Lisa (2010-11-09), "Consensus 125-C23", UTC #125 / L2 #222 Minutes
7.0	U+16AD0..16AED, 16AF0..16AF5	36	L2/11-041R	N3991	Riley, Charles (2011-02-14), Bassa Vah Comma
7.0	U+16AD0..16AED, 16AF0..16AF5	36	L2/11-016		Moore, Lisa (2011-02-15), "Bassa Vah Comma (C.17)", UTC #126 / L2 #223 Minutes
7.0	U+16AD0..16AED, 16AF0..16AF5	36		N3903 (pdf, doc)	"M57.15", Unconfirmed minutes of WG2 meeting 57, 2011-03-31
7.0	U+16AD0..16AED, 16AF0..16AF5	36	L2/11-261R2		Moore, Lisa (2011-08-16), "Consensus 128-C28", UTC #128 / L2 #225 Minutes, "Approve the revised codepoint for U+16AF5 BASSA VAH FULL STOP."
7.0	U+16AD0..16AED, 16AF0..16AF5	36		N4103	"T.5. Bassa Vah", Unconfirmed minutes of WG 2 meeting 58, 2012-01-03
