= Vasile Botnaru =

Moldovan journalist

Vasile Botnaru OR
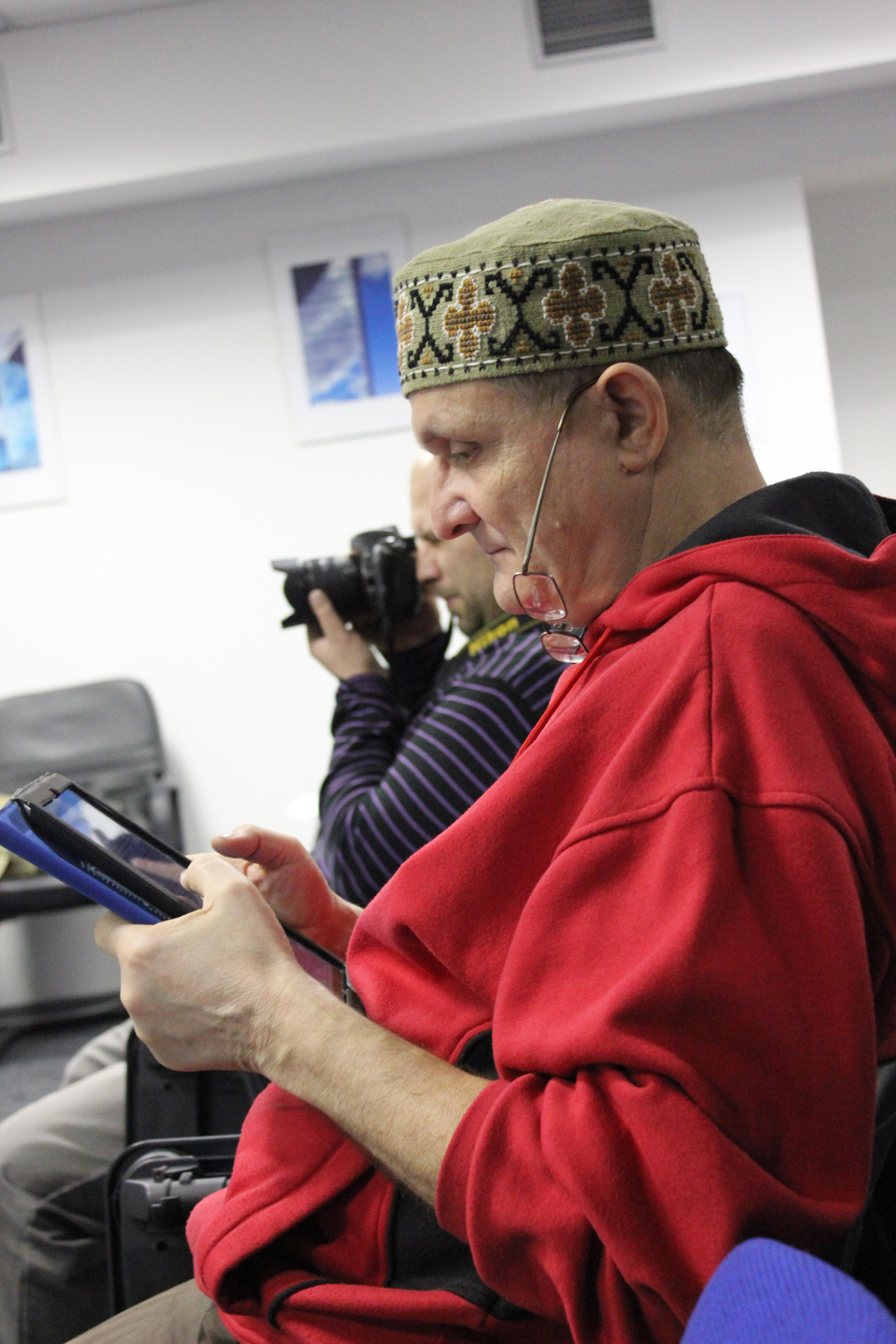
- Botnaru in 2011
- Born: 12 January 1957 (age 69); Cinişeuţi, Moldavian SSR, Soviet Union
- Education: Lomonosov Moscow State University
- Occupation: Journalist
- Employer: Radio Free Europe
- Known for: head Radio Free Europe Chişinău
- Awards: Order of the Republic (Moldova)

Vasile Botnaru (born 12 January 1957) is a journalist from the Republic of Moldova. He is the head of Radio Free Europe Chişinău.

== Biography ==
Vasile Botnaru graduated from the Faculty of Journalism of Lomonosov Moscow State University. He has worked as photo reporter, secretary of the editorial board, and political commentator. Together with two colleagues, he founded the Basa Press News Agency in November 1992. He has contributed to the import of the Pro TV Television to Chişinău and is a correspondent for Associated Press.

== Awards ==
- Order of the Republic (Moldova) - highest state distinctions (2009)
