= Bassa, Chamba =

Bassa
- Town
- Location within Himachal Pradesh
- Coordinates: 32°34′12″N 76°7′48″E
- Country: India
- State: Himachal Pradesh
- District: Chamba district

Population (2015)
  - Total: 80
- Time zone: UTC+5:30 (IST)
- Post code: 176308
- Area code: +91-18992-xxxxx
- Vehicle registration: HP-48 and HP-73

Bassa is a small village situated in Chamba district, Himachal Pradesh, India. Village population is around 80. Ravi River flows front of this village.
