= Basa (surname) =

Basa or Baša is a surname. Notable people with the surname include:

- César Basa (1915–1941), Philippine Air Force pilot and first Filipino casualty of World War II
- Marko Baša (born 1982), Montenegrin footballer
- Román Basa (1848–1897), Filipino leader of a secret society opposed to Spanish rule
- Victor Basa (born 1985), Filipino model, actor and VJ
