= British Airlines Stewards and Stewardesses Association =

Former trade union of the United Kingdom

BASSA
- British Airlines Stewards and Stewardesses Association
- Headquarters: Harlington, London
- Location: United Kingdom
- Members: c. 10,700
- Key people: Marie-Louise Elliott (Weezie) Branch Chair
- Affiliations: Unite the Union; Trades Union Congress
- Website: bassa.co.uk

The British Airlines Stewards and Stewardesses Association (BASSA) is a branch of the British trade union Unite. Until 2020, it exclusively represented Cabin Crew on Eurofleet and Worldwide fleets at London Heathrow airport. However, since the merger of all the fleets into the Heathrow Cabin Crew Team, they've become the largest Cabin Crew Union at Heathrow Airport with 90% of eligible crew.

Originally part of the Transport and General Workers' Union (TGWU), set-up after the Cabin Crew 89 breakaway, BASSA is now part of Unite the Union. With an office at Heathrow Airport, it provides year-round 24 hour support, with a secure website service for members and an emergency number for operational issues. Membership is now near an all time high point of over 11,500.

BASSA retains its position as one of the largest branches of any union within the UK. For over a decade Unite directly represented British Airways' fast-growing new entrant Mixed Fleet employees, which limited the scope for increasing BASSA membership at that time, because its constituent Worldwide and Eurofleets were not able to recruit new crew since 2008.

However, this changed from November 2020, when all three fleets at Heathrow merged into a single Heathrow Cabin Crew Team. All crew now are eligible to join BASSA, thus marking the first time new crew could be welcomed into BASSA since the British Airways takeover of BMI.

The current Branch Chair is Marie-Louise Elliott (Weezie), a BA Inflight Manager.

== See also ==
- British Airline Pilots' Association
- List of trade unions
- List of Transport and General Workers' Union amalgamations
