= Bassa Vah alphabet =

Alphabet for the Bassa language of Liberia

Bassa Vah 𖫔𖫧𖫳𖫒𖫨𖫰𖫨𖫱 𖫣𖫧𖫱
- Script type: Alphabet
- Direction: Left-to-right
- Languages: Bassa language

ISO 15924
- ISO 15924: Bass (259), Bassa Vah

Unicode
- Unicode alias: Bassa Vah
- Unicode range: Final accepted Unicode proposal, U+16AD0–U+16AFF

Bassa Vah (Bassa: 𖫔𖫧𖫳𖫒𖫨𖫰𖫨𖫱 𖫣𖫧𖫱, romanized: ɓǎsɔ́ɔ̀ và), also known as simply Vah (𖫣𖫧𖫱), meaning 'throwing a sign' in Bassa, is an alphabetic script for writing the Bassa language of Liberia. As an old system nearing extinction in the 1900s, it was rediscovered among Bassa in Brazil and the West Indies, then revived in Liberia, by Thomas Flo Lewis. Type was cast for it, and an association for its promotion was formed in Liberia in 1959. It is not used today and has been classified as a failed script.

== Letters ==
Vah is written from left to right. It is a true alphabet, with 23 consonant letters, 7 vowels, and 5 tone diacritics.

A full-stop/period is represented with 𖫵.

𖫐 IPA: [n] n	𖫑 IPA: [k] k	𖫒 IPA: [s] s	𖫓 IPA: [f] f	𖫔 IPA: [ɓ/m] ɓ/m	𖫕 IPA: [dʲ]/[ɲ] dy/ny	𖫖 IPA: [g] g	𖫗 IPA: [d] d	𖫘 IPA: [k͡p] kp	𖫙 IPA: [ɟ] j
𖫚 IPA: [xʷ]/[ħʷ] xw	𖫛 IPA: [w] w	𖫜 IPA: [z] z	𖫝 IPA: [g͡b/ŋ͡m] gb/gm	𖫞 IPA: [ɗ/ɾ/ɺ] ɖ	𖫟 IPA: [c] c	𖫠 IPA: [hʷ] hw	𖫡 IPA: [t] t	𖫢 IPA: [b] b	𖫣 IPA: [v] v
𖫤 IPA: [h] h	𖫥 IPA: [p] p	𖫦 IPA: [ɾ] r	𖫧 IPA: [a] a	𖫨 IPA: [ɔ] ɔ	𖫩 IPA: [o] o	𖫪 IPA: [u] u	𖫫 IPA: [e] e	𖫬 IPA: [ɛ] ɛ	𖫭 IPA: [i] i

The letter 𖫔 is pronounced as /ɓ/ <ɓ> when followed by an oral vowel, for example 𖫔𖫧𖫴 <ɓâ> (friend). However, it's pronounced as /m/ <m> when followed by a nasal vowel - 𖫔𖫨𖫰𖫐 mɔ̃ (to want, wish).

The letter 𖫕 is pronounced as /dʲ/ <dy> when followed by an oral vowel, for example 𖫕𖫪𖫰 <dyú> (child). However, it's pronounced as /ɲ/ <ny> when followed by a nasal vowel - 𖫤𖫭𖫲𖫐𖫕𖫫𖫲𖫐 <hĩnyɛ̃> (four).

The letter 𖫝 is pronounced as /ɡ͡b/ <gb> when followed by an oral vowel, for example 𖫝𖫧𖫳 <gbǎ> (to lock). However, it's pronounced as /ŋ͡m/ <gm> when followed by a nasal vowel - 𖫝𖫧𖫲𖫐 gmã (law).

The letter 𖫞 is pronounced as /ɾ/ when written after 𖫗 /d/ or 𖫡 /t/ - 𖫡𖫩𖫳𖫞𖫩𖫳 /to˧ɾo˧/ (mountain), and is pronounced as /ɺ/ when written after any other consonants - 𖫓𖫪𖫰𖫞𖫪𖫰 /fu˦ɺu˦/ (to float). This letter is never immediately followed by a nasal vowel.

The letter 𖫦 is rarely used. It represents the sound /ɾ/, which is an allophone of /ɗ/, and appears only after /t/ or /d/ in a syllable initial 'cluster'. But this is usually written with the letter 𖫞.

Nasal vowels are written with the letter 𖫐 (n) after a corresponding vowel letter.

𖫧𖫐 IPA: [ã] ã	𖫨𖫐 IPA: [ɔ̃] ɔ̃	𖫪𖫐 IPA: [ũ] ũ	𖫬𖫐 IPA: [ɛ̃] ɛ̃	𖫭𖫐 IPA: [ĩ] ĩ

=== Tones ===
Vah uses five diacritical marks to denote tonality of its vowels. It distinguishes five tones: high, low, mid, mid-rising, and falling.

Tone diacritics with all vowels
high ◌𖫰 IPA: ˦	low ◌𖫱 IPA: ˨	mid ◌𖫲 IPA: ˧	mid-rising ◌𖫳 IPA: ˨˧	falling ◌𖫴 IPA: ˥˩
𖫧𖫰 á	𖫧𖫱 à	𖫧𖫲 a	𖫧𖫳 ǎ	𖫧𖫴 â
𖫨𖫰 ɔ́	𖫨𖫱 ɔ̀	𖫨𖫲 ɔ	𖫨𖫳 ɔ̌	𖫨𖫴 ɔ̂
𖫩𖫰 ó	𖫩𖫱 ò	𖫩𖫲 o	𖫩𖫳 ǒ	𖫩𖫴 ô
𖫪𖫰 ú	𖫪𖫱 ù	𖫪𖫲 u	𖫪𖫳 ǔ	𖫪𖫴 û
𖫫𖫰 é	𖫫𖫱 è	𖫫𖫲 e	𖫫𖫳 ě	𖫫𖫴 ê
𖫬𖫰 ɛ́	𖫬𖫱 ɛ̀	𖫬𖫲 ɛ	𖫬𖫳 ɛ̌	𖫬𖫴 ɛ̂
𖫭𖫰 í	𖫭𖫱 ì	𖫭𖫲 i	𖫭𖫳 ǐ	𖫭𖫴 î

The letters table shows the alphabetic order of the script. The tones above reflect the order they appear in the alphabet order as well. A vowel with tones are ordered before the subsequent vowel. For example, the vowel 𖫧 <a> is followed by 𖫧𖫰 𖫧𖫱 𖫧𖫲 𖫧𖫳 𖫧𖫴 and then the next vowel, 𖫨 <ɔ>, is ordered.

=== Sample texts ===
Article 1 of the Universal Declaration of Human Rights:
𖫞𖫫𖫰 𖫐𖫭𖫱𖫐-𖫗𖫭𖫰𖫞𖫭𖫰 𖫑𖫫𖫱 𖫔𖫬𖫱𖫞𖫬𖫱𖫭𖫱𖫐-𖫕𖫭𖫰 𖫔𖫪𖫰𖫬𖫲, 𖫞𖫫𖫰𖫬𖫱 𖫕𖫨𖫲𖫐-𖫕𖫪𖫱 𖫒𖫫𖫰𖫭𖫰𖫐 𖫛𖫩𖫰𖫞𖫩𖫰𖫬𖫲 𖫔𖫬𖫰𖫭𖫱𖫐 𖫛𖫨𖫐𖫵 𖫑𖫫𖫰 𖫛𖫧𖫲 𖫔𖫫𖫰𖫞𖫫𖫰 𖫠𖫭𖫱𖫞𖫭𖫱𖫭𖫲-𖫥𖫩𖫲𖫭𖫱𖫐 𖫠𖫩𖫱𖫞𖫩𖫱-𖫕𖫪𖫱𖫧𖫱 𖫑𖫫𖫱 𖫞𖫬𖫲 𖫔𖫪𖫱𖫐𖫭𖫲𖫐 𖫛𖫨𖫰𖫐-𖫛𖫨𖫰𖫐 𖫒𖫨𖫱𖫫𖫱𖫭𖫱𖫐 𖫞𖫫𖫰 𖫕𖫨𖫲𖫪𖫰𖫐, 𖫑𖫫𖫰 𖫛𖫧𖫲 𖫔𖫫𖫰𖫞𖫫𖫰 𖫔𖫬𖫰 𖫛𖫧𖫲𖫧𖫱 𖫕𖫪𖫲𖫐-𖫞𖫬𖫱 𖫑𖫫𖫰 𖫝𖫩𖫲 𖫔𖫪𖫲𖫐𖫭𖫱𖫐 𖫔𖫩𖫰 𖫞𖫭𖫰𖫭𖫰 𖫑𖫧𖫱𖫵

Sample words
𖫐 IPA: [n] 𖫐𖫧𖫰𖫐 (to drink)	𖫑 IPA: [k] 𖫑𖫧𖫰 (to cut open)	𖫒 IPA: [s] 𖫒𖫧𖫲 (to be tired)	𖫓 IPA: [f] 𖫓𖫧𖫰 (to rip)	𖫔 IPA: [ɓ/m] 𖫔𖫧𖫰𖫐𖫧𖫲𖫐 (night)	𖫕 IPA: [dʲ]/[ɲ] 𖫕𖫧𖫰 (to climb up)	𖫖 IPA: [g] 𖫖𖫧𖫲𖫐 (to choose)	𖫗 IPA: [d] 𖫗𖫧𖫲 (somewhere)	𖫘 IPA: [k͡p] 𖫘𖫧𖫰 (to happen)	𖫙 IPA: [ɟ] 𖫙𖫧𖫳𖫧𖫱 (truth)
𖫚 IPA: [xʷ]/[ħʷ] 𖫚𖫧𖫲 (hand)	𖫛 IPA: [w] 𖫛𖫧𖫲 (they/them)	𖫜 IPA: [z] 𖫜𖫧𖫱 (to remove)	𖫝 IPA: [g͡b/ŋ͡m] 𖫝𖫧𖫲 (on (a road))	𖫞 IPA: [ɗ/ɾ/ɺ] 𖫞𖫧𖫰 (to call)	𖫟 IPA: [c] 𖫟𖫧𖫰 (to deceive)	𖫠 IPA: [hʷ] 𖫠𖫧𖫲𖫞𖫧𖫲 (to vomit)	𖫡 IPA: [t] 𖫡𖫧𖫲𖫐 (three)	𖫢 IPA: [b] 𖫢𖫧𖫲𖫐 (to be rich, plentiful)	𖫣 IPA: [v] 𖫣𖫧𖫱𖫧𖫳 (green leaf)
𖫤 IPA: [h] 𖫤𖫨𖫲𖫐𖫞𖫬𖫱𖫞𖫬𖫱 (hundred)	𖫥 IPA: [p] 𖫥𖫧𖫰 (to drink)	𖫦 IPA: [ɾ] 𖫦𖫧𖫰 (to plant)	𖫧 IPA: [a] 𖫧𖫱 (we)	𖫨 IPA: [ɔ] 𖫨𖫲 (he, she, it, his, hers, its, him, her)	𖫩 IPA: [o] 𖫩𖫰𖫩𖫱-𖫟𖫪𖫱 (oak tree)	𖫪 IPA: [u] 𖫓𖫪𖫰𖫞𖫪𖫰 (to float)	𖫫 IPA: [e] 𖫟𖫫𖫰𖫞𖫬𖫱 (book)	𖫬 IPA: [ɛ] 𖫞𖫬𖫲 (thing)	𖫭 IPA: [i] 𖫭𖫰𖫐𖫙𖫧𖫱 (angel)

== Unicode ==
Bassa Vah was added to the Unicode Standard in June 2014 with the release of version 7.0.

The Unicode block for Bassa Vah is U+16AD0–U+16AFF:

Bassa Vah^{[1]}^{[2]} Official Unicode Consortium code chart (PDF)
	0	1	2	3	4	5	6	7	8	9	A	B	C	D	E	F
U+16ADx	𖫐	𖫑	𖫒	𖫓	𖫔	𖫕	𖫖	𖫗	𖫘	𖫙	𖫚	𖫛	𖫜	𖫝	𖫞	𖫟
U+16AEx	𖫠	𖫡	𖫢	𖫣	𖫤	𖫥	𖫦	𖫧	𖫨	𖫩	𖫪	𖫫	𖫬	𖫭		
U+16AFx	𖫰	𖫱	𖫲	𖫳	𖫴	𖫵										
Notes 1.As of Unicode version 17.0 2.Grey areas indicate non-assigned code points
