= BASA Film =

BASA Film (Bashgahe Cinema, meaning Afghanistan Cinema Club) is a nonprofit organization that promotes cultural development in Afghanistan. It is made up of artists and cultural activists from Afghanistan, and some voluntary artists from around the world, including skilled professionals in cinema, literature, photography and graphic design. The organization"s major activities include producing documentary and narrative films; launching and providing film training courses; organizing public screenings for special audiences; supporting foreign production teams inside Afghanistan; sending artists' work to international festivals; and organizing large cultural events in Kabul, such as film festivals.

Documentary films produced by BASA, such as Pamir Territory (2003), Drought in Hazarajat (2003), and The End of the Earth (2001) have won international awards and been screened worldwide at prestigious festivals. BASA has produced several films about women"s rights in Afghanistan. The film 25 Percent (2007) depicts female members of the Afghan parliament and their struggles to gain rights, recognition and respect in the male-dominated environment of the Wolesi Jirga. Mohtarama (2012) tells the story of the grassroots women"s movement in Kabul, and two other east and west provinces of Afghanistan. These films have been screened for members of the British, Norwegian and Swedish parliaments, as well as at universities in the United States including the University of Tennessee.

In October 2011, with the support of various national and international organizations, BASA organized first edition of The Afghanistan International Human Rights Film Festival, the first human rights film festival to be held in Kabul. The festival serves as a hub for artists and filmmakers dealing with issues of censorship, war and other human rights abuses. It aims to encourage filmmakers to use their cameras to document struggles against discrimination, injustice and violence. In October 2013, BASA will host the second Autumn Human Rights Film Festival.

== Projects ==
- Organizing the Second Take Film Festival in Kabul
- Organizer of Kabul Film Festival
- Publishing of monthly art magazine theme
- Organizer of Afghanistan Human Rights Film Festival

== Members ==
- Malek Shafi'i
