= BASA-press =

- Industry: news agency
- Founded: November 5, 1992; 33 years ago
- Founder: Vasile Botnaru
- Defunct: 31 December 2009
- Headquarters: Chişinău, Moldova
- Key people: Vasile Botnaru
- Services: News media
- Number of employees: 20
- Website: basa.md

BASA-press was a newsagency from the Republic of Moldova. Founded in November 1992, Moldova's oldest independent newsagency ceased its activity in December 2009.

== History ==
BASA press was founded by a group of five journalists (including Vasile Botnaru) in Chişinău on 5 November 1992. The newsagency was the first independent news agency in the Republic of Moldova. Infotag was the second one, operating officially since 1 December 1993. BASA-press covered the entire range of political, social, economic, business and other events.

On 31 December 2009, BASA-press, Moldova's oldest independent news agency closed down. Agency's ex-director Sergiu Ipati told the agency had been closed down because of the ongoing crisis. In 2009, the Moldovan information market lost another news agency - Flux, which was controlled by the Christian-Democratic People's Party (Moldova).
