= Al-Bassa =

Al-Bassa البصة
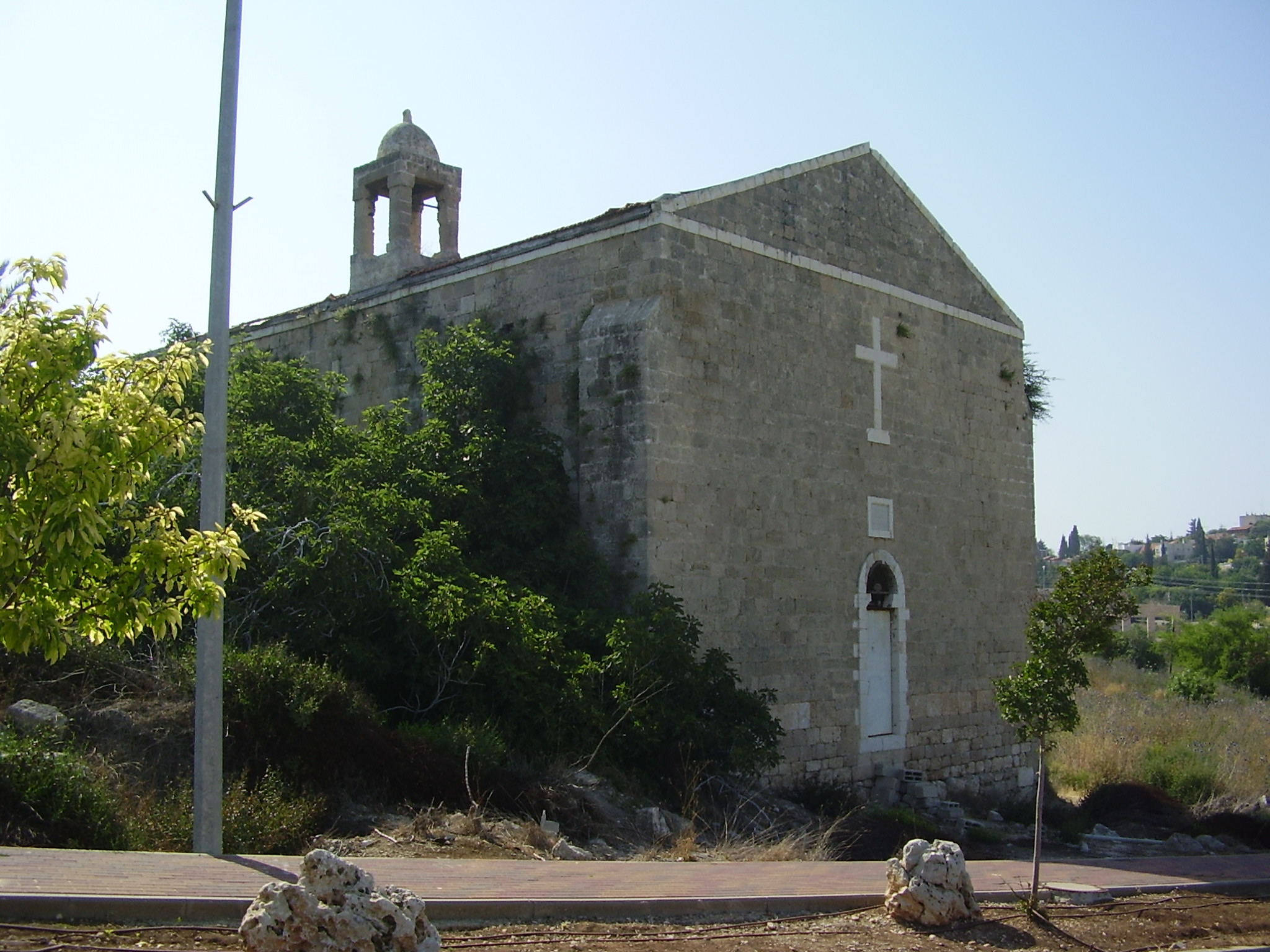

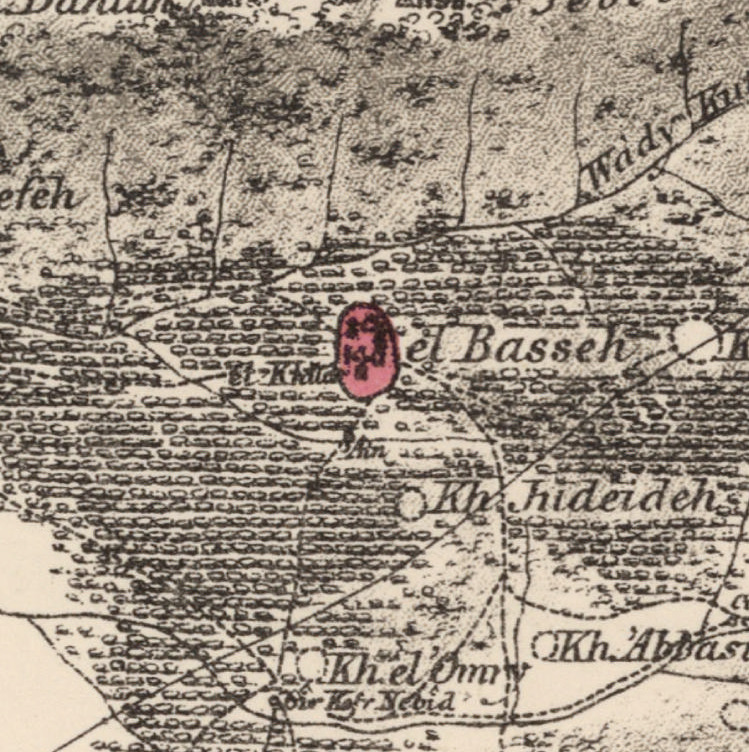
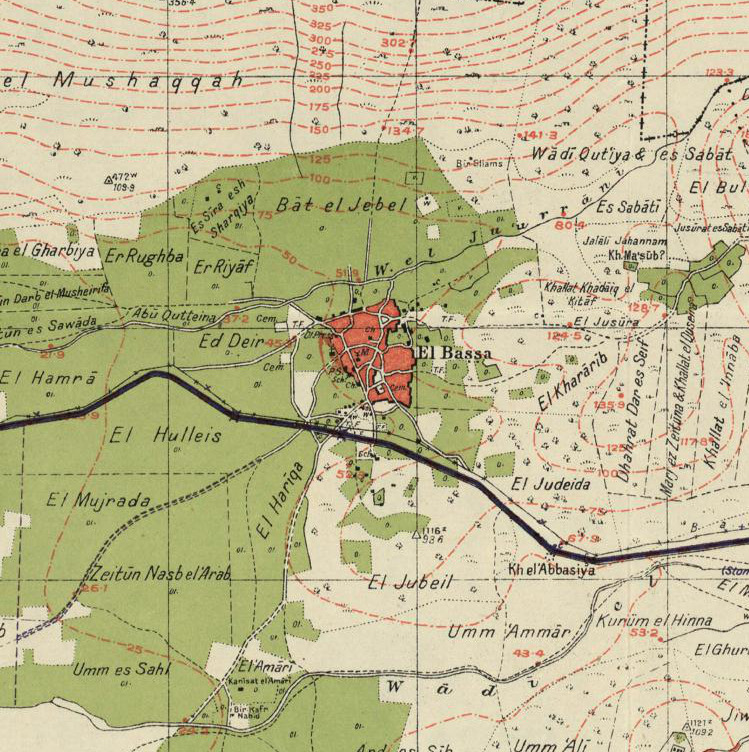
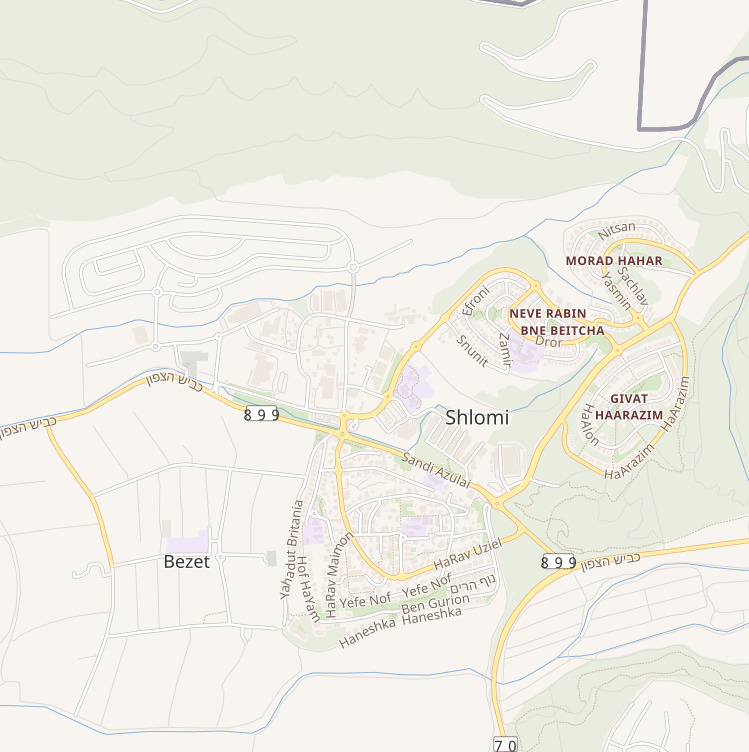
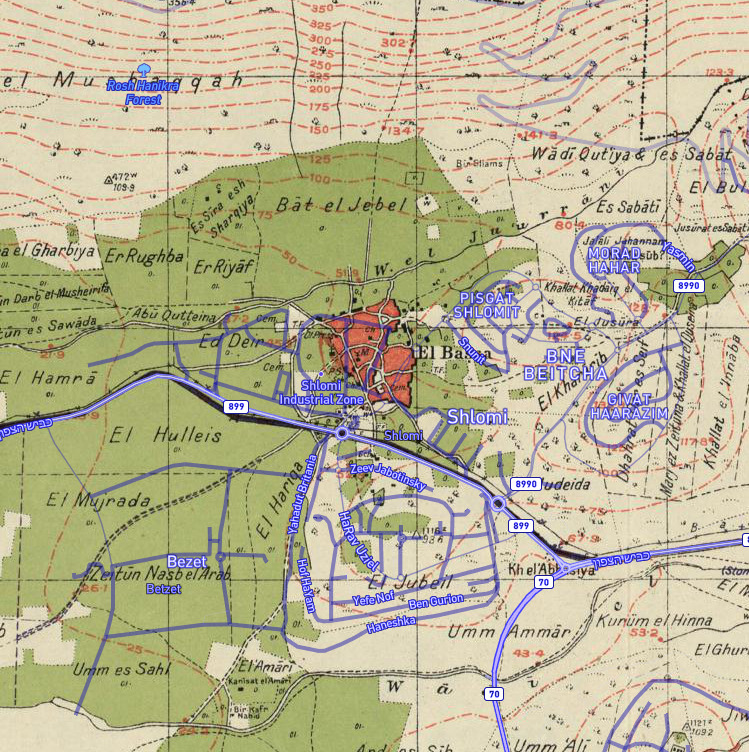
- 1870s map 1940s map modern map 1940s with modern overlay map A series of historical maps of the area around Al-Bassa (click the buttons)

- Location within Mandatory Palestine
- Coordinates: 33°04′39″N 35°08′39″E
- Palestine grid: 164/276
- Geopolitical entity: Mandatory Palestine
- Subdistrict: Acre
- Date of depopulation: 14 May 1948

Area
  - Total: 25.2 km^{2} (9.7 sq mi)

Population (1945)
  - Total: 2,950
- Cause(s) of depopulation: Expulsion by Yishuv forces
- Secondary cause: Military assault by Yishuv forces
- Current Localities: Betzet, Rosh HaNiqra, Shlomi, Tzahal, Matzuva

al-Bassa (Arabic: البصة) was a Palestinian Arab village in the Mandatory Palestine's Acre Subdistrict. It was situated close to the Lebanese border, 19 kilometers (12 mi) north of the district capital, Acre, and 65 meters (213 ft) above sea level.

During the 1948 Palestine War the village was stormed by Haganah troops in May 1948 and almost completely razed. Its residents were either internally displaced or expelled to neighboring countries as part of the 1948 Palestinian expulsion. Today, the ruins of the village are in the northern quarters of the town of Shlomi.

== Etymology ==
Adolf Neubauer "proposed to identify this place with the Batzet of the Talmud". It was called Bezeth during the Roman period, and its Arabic name is al-Basah. In the period of Crusader rule in Palestine, it was known as Le Bace or LeBassa. Imad ad-Din al-Isfahani (d. 1201), a chronicler and advisor to Saladin, referred to the village as Ayn al-Bassa, 'Ayn meaning 'spring' in Arabic.

== History ==
The site shows signs of habitation in prehistory and the Middle Bronze Age.

An ancient Christian burial place and 18 other archaeological sites were located in the village.

=== Roman and Byzantine empires ===
Blown glass pitchers uncovered in a tomb in al-Bassa were dated to circa 396 CE. The tomb was dated from coins found in it, and crosses on some of the pottery indicated that it was Christian burial.

According to Grootkerk, there was a Jewish settlement here between 70 and 425 CE.

The Survey of Western Palestine, sponsored by the Palestine Exploration Fund, identified al-Bassa as, "probably a Crusading village"; however, archaeological excavations only uncovered architectural evidence of an ecclesiastical farm in operation there between the 5th to 8th centuries.

=== Middle Ages ===
Although pottery sherds found by archaeologists indicate continuous habitation throughout the Middle Ages, no Crusader-period architectural remains were discovered yet as of 1997. A capital decorated with a cross once dated to the Crusader period was later re-dated to the Byzantine period.

The site was used in 1189 C.E. as a Crusader encampment during a military campaign, and a document dated October 1200 recorded the sale of the village by King Amalric II of Jerusalem to the Teutonic Order. A-Bassa was the first village listed as part of the domain of the Crusaders during the hudna (Islamic ceasefire) between the Crusaders based in Acre and the Mamluk sultan al-Mansur (Qalawun) in 1283.

=== Ottoman Empire ===
In 1596, al-Bassa was part of the Ottoman Empire, a village in the nahiya (subdistrict) of Tibnin under the Safad Sanjak, with a population of 76 Muslim families and 28 Muslim bachelors. It paid taxes on a number of crops, including wheat olives, barley, cotton and fruits, as well as on goats, beehives and pasture land; a total of 7,000 Akçe.

In the 18th century, al-Bassa became a zone of contention between Daher al-Umar and the chiefs of Jabal Amil under Sheikh Nasif al-Nassar, while under his successor, Jezzar Pasha, al-Bassa was made the administrative center of the nahiya in around 1770. In 1799, Napoleon Bonaparte described al-Bassa as a village of 600 Metawalis. A map by Pierre Jacotin from Napoleon's invasion of that year showed the place, named as El Basa.

The European explorer Van de Velde visited "el-Bussa" in 1851, and stayed with the sheikh, Aisel Yusuf, writing that "The clean house of Sheck Yusuf is a welcome sight, and the verdant meadows around the village are truly refreshing to the eye". He further noted that "The inhabitants of Bussah are almost all members of the Greek Church. A few Musselmans live among them, and a few fellahs of a Bedouin tribe which wanders about in the neighborhood are frequently seen in the street."

In 1863, the village was visited by Henry Baker Tristram who described it as a Christian village, where "olive oil, goats´hair, and tobacco, seemed to be principal produce of the district; the latter being exported in some quantities, by way of Acre, to Egypt. Bee-keeping, also, is not an unimportant item of industry, and every house possesses a pile of bee-hives in its yard."

Quote from Tristram, 1863

The houses, excepting the very poorest, seem all alike. Each had a courtyard, with a high wall, for the goats, camels, firewood, and bees. At the end of the yard stands the mud-built house, with a single door opening into its one room. A pillar and two arches run across it, and support the flat roof. The door opens into the stable portion [...] where horses and camels are standing before the manger of dried mud. Stepping up from this, the visitor finds himself at once in the simple dwelling-room of the family. A large matting of flattened rush generally covers one half, and a few cushions are spread in the corner, near the unglazed window. At the further end there are mud stairs leading up to the roof, the summer bedchamber of the family. Furniture there is none, except the few cooking utensils hanging on wooden pegs, a hole in the centre of the floor for holding the fire, with a few loose iron rods across the top, and the quaint wooden cradles of the babies, apparently hereditary heirlooms. In the better houses, there is a mat screen across the platform, behind which sleep the single women and girls. [...] On the top of every house is a wattled booth of oleander boughs, sometimes of two stories, with a wicker-work floor, in which the inhabitants sleep during the hot weather [...] The tough and tenacious leaves of the oleander never shrivel or fall off, and form an effectual shade for many weeks.[...]

— Henry Baker Tristram

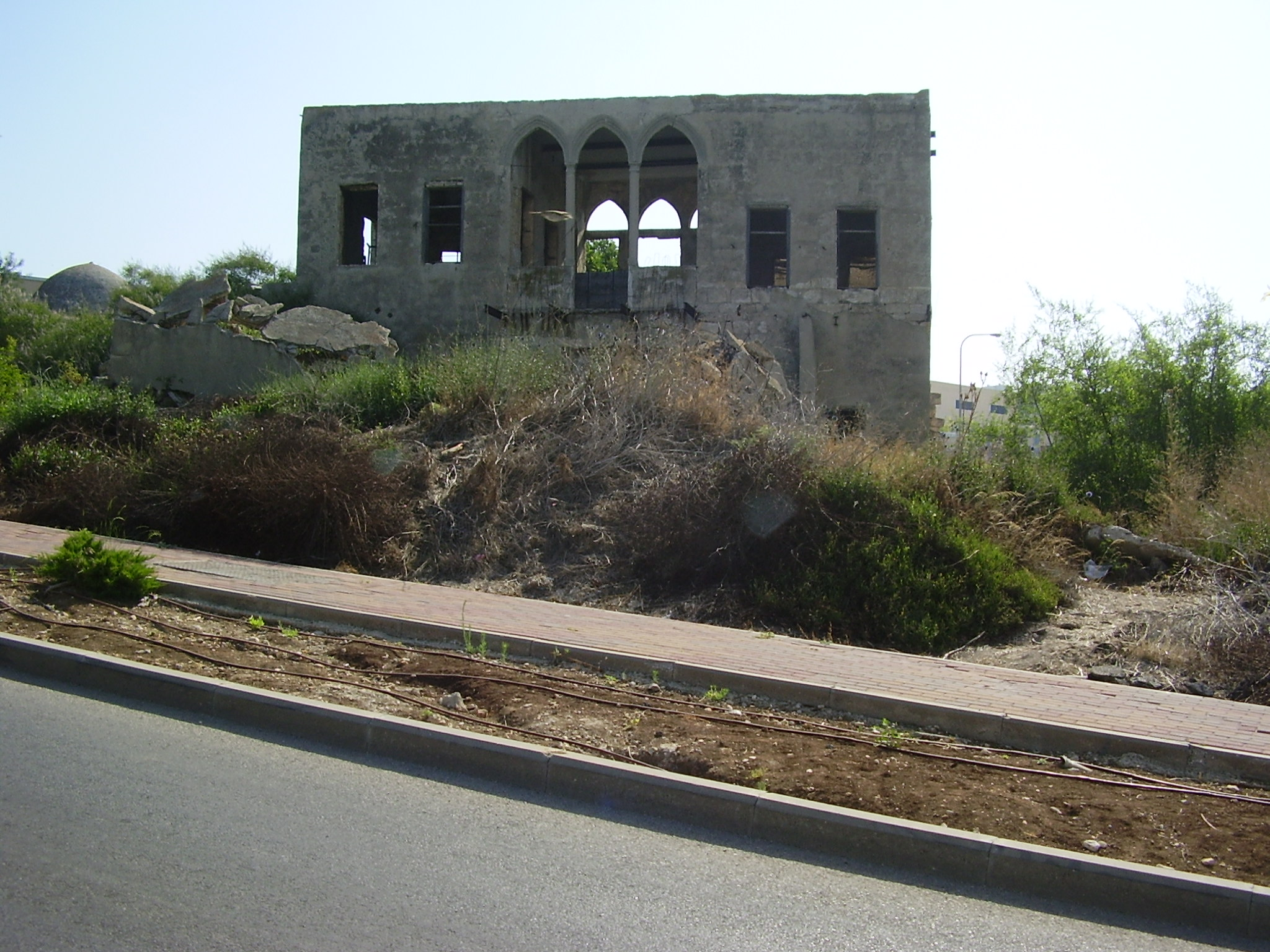
El Khouri mansion, 2008

In the late 19th century, the village of Al-Bassa was described as being built of stone, situated on the edge of a plain, surrounded by large groves of olives and gardens of pomegranate, figs and apples. The village had about 1,050 residents.

The village had a public elementary school for boys (built by the Ottomans in 1882), a private secondary school, and a public elementary school for girls.

A population list from about 1887 showed that el Basseh had 1,960 inhabitants; one third Muslim, and two thirds Greek Catholic Christians.

=== British Mandate ===
The Franco-British boundary agreement of 1920 described an imprecisely defined boundary between Lebanon and Palestine. It appeared to pass close to the north of al-Bassa, leaving the village on the Palestinian side but cut off from much of its lands. However the French government included al-Bassa in a Lebanese census of 1921 and granted citizenship to its residents. Meanwhile, a joint British-French boundary commission was working to determine a precise border, making many adjustments in the process. By February 1922 it had determined a border that confirmed al-Bassa as being in Palestine. This became official in 1923. In 1922, the people of al-Bassa founded a local council which was responsible for managing its local affairs. The citizenship of the residents was changed to Palestinian in 1926.

The British census of September 1922 listed a population of 867 Christians, 366 "Mohammedans", 150 Metawilehs, and 1 Jew. The Christians were listed as Greek Catholic (Melchite) (721), Orthodox (120), Church of England (17), Armenian Catholic (8), and one Roman Catholic. Asher Kaufman described the village as being "split between Sunnis and Greek Catholics". At the 1931 census, which did not distinguish Metawalis from other Muslims, the village had 868 Muslims, 1076 Christians, and 4 Bahais.

The 1938 camp of Jewish labourers and Notrim (police) for construction of Tegart's wall was located adjacent to the village, and it ultimately became the site of a Tegart fort. By 1945 the village was home to a regional college.

The village's main economic activity was olive picking. Important public structures at the time of its existence included two mosques, two churches, three schools and 18 other shrines both holy to Muslims and Christians. Al-Bassa was the only Palestinian village in the Galilee with a Christian high school. Some of Bassa's former public structures have been preserved and are found today within the Israeli localities of Shlomi and Betzet.

==== Arab Revolt and 1938 massacre ====
On 7 September 1938 a massacre of Palestinian Arabs was perpetrated by the British Army in the village. The massacre was committed as a part of British efforts to suppress the 1936-1939 Arab Revolt in Palestine, and was conducted by a company of the Royal Ulster Rifles (RUR) and a detachment of the 11th Hussars. The village was razed and about 50 Arabs from the village were collected by the RUR and some attached Royal Engineers. Some who tried to run away were shot. Then, according to British testimony, the remainder were put onto a bus which was forced to drive over a land mine laid by the soldiers, destroying the bus and killing many of the occupants. The village's inhabitants were then forced to dig a pit and throw all the remnants of the maimed bodies into it. Arab accounts reported torture and other brutality. At least 20 Palestinians were killed in the attack.

The village of al-Bassa was targeted as a punitive reprisal operation after four Royal Ulster Rifles soldiers were killed and two seriously wounded by a landmine on September 6. Professor Mark McGovern of Edge Hill University states that the attack on al-Bassa was part of a pattern of British counterinsurgency tactics:

"Nor was the massacre at al-Bassa an isolated incident. Rather, it was part of a much wider policy of ‘reprisals’ that marked the British Mandate’s repression of the Arab Revolt. As conflict escalated this official reprisals policy saw houses blown up, or groups of houses demolished, property looted, food stores systematically destroyed, forced labour, ‘punitive village occupations’, the imposition of crushing collective fines and wholesale destruction of ‘bad villages’. Torture centres were set up and many Arab prisoners shot ‘while trying to escape’. ‘Special Night Squads’, consisting of British and Jewish settler policemen and moving at night (often disguised as Arabs) terrorised Arab villages, humiliating and killing Arab civilians."

In 2022, a Nablus businessman, Munib al-Masri (88) who was shot by British troops in 1944, after an independent review of documentation by two international legal scholars, Luis Moreno Ocampo and Ben Emmerson, stated that he would present the British government with a 300 page dossier on this and other incidents, seeking accountability and a formal apology for abuses during the period of the British mandate.

==== 1940s ====
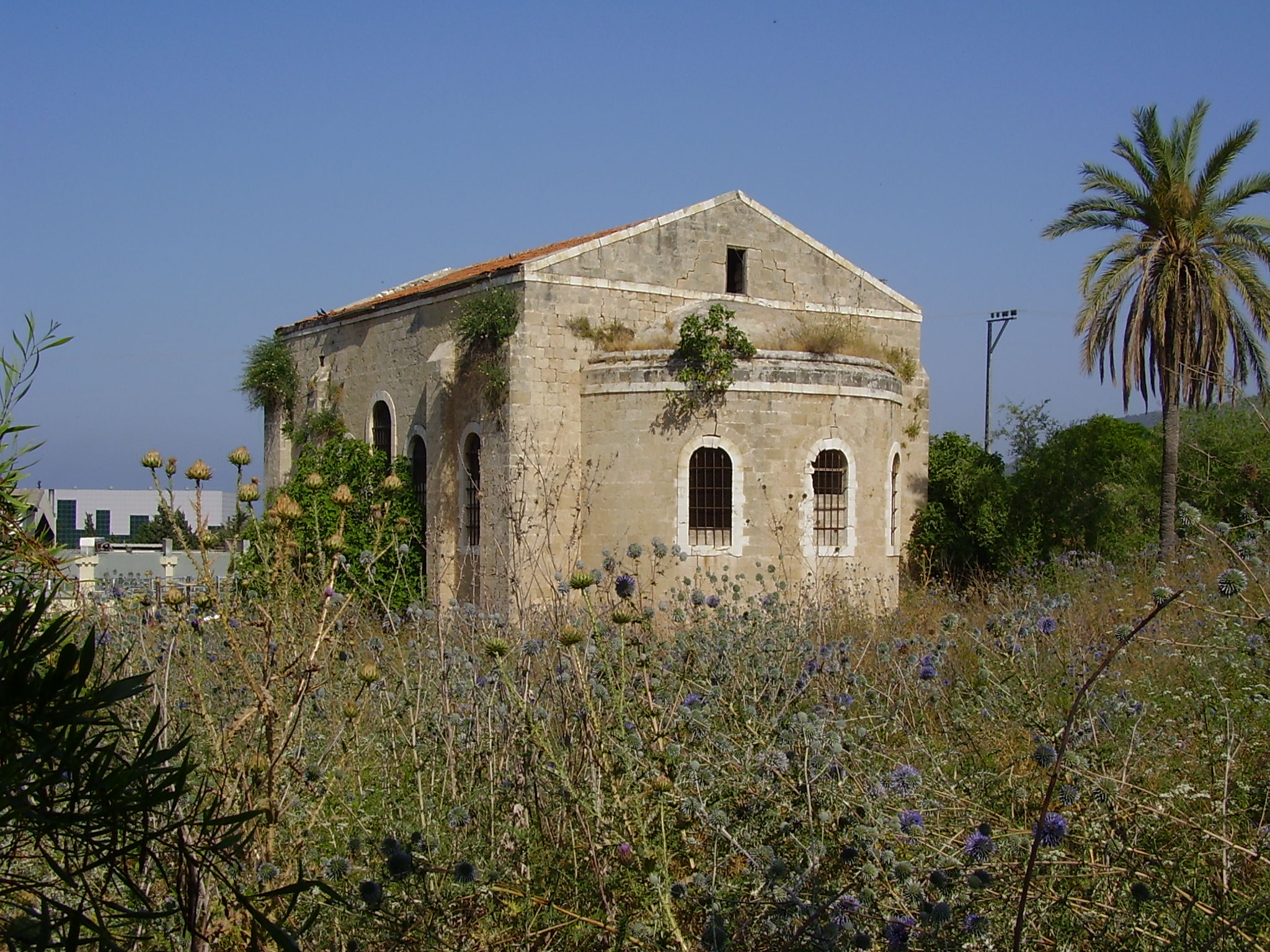
The church in al-Bassa in 2008

Al-Bassa was one of the largest, most developed villages in the north of the country, covering a land area of some 20,000 dunams of hills and plains, 2,000 of which were irrigated. A regional commercial center, it contained over sixty shops and eleven coffeehouses, a few of which sat along the Haifa-Beirut highway. The active village council had paved roads, installed a system of running water, and oversaw the convening of a wholesale produce market there every Sunday. An agricultural cooperative in the village counted over 150 members that promoted agricultural development, while also providing loans to local farmers. The population of about 4,000 was divided almost evenly between Muslims and Christians. Among the village institutions were a government run elementary school, a "National High School", a Greek Orthodox church, a Catholic church, and a mosque. The village was situated in the territory allotted to the Arab state under the 1947 UN Partition Plan.

In the 1945 statistics, the population had grown to 2,950; 1360 Muslims and 1590 Christians, with 25,258 dunums (6,241 acres) of land according to an official land and population survey. Of this, Arabs used 614 dunams for citrus and bananas, 14,699 dunams were plantations and irrigable land; 10,437 were used for cereals, while 132 dunams were built-up (urban) land.

=== 1948 Palestine war ===
Al-Bassa was captured by paramilitary Haganah forces during the 1948 Arab–Israeli War, in Operation Ben-Ami, on May 14, 1948. Al-Bassa's defenders were local militia men. Following its capture, the Haganah's Palmach forces concentrated the villagers in the local church where they shot and killed a number of youths before chasing the villagers out. (Note: Saleh Abdel Jawad, 2007, Zionist Massacres: the Creation of the Palestinian Refugee Problem in the 1948 War. "14 May 1948: Bassa (Acre area, Western Galilee): Indiscriminate killings occur. The Haganah rounds up fleeing civilians in the Greek Orthodox Church and kills at least five people inside the church. A larger group, which includes the young Salim Darweish and his sister Elaine, is taken outside the church and those present are killed. At least 14 are killed.") One witness to the expulsion said that it was preceded by soldiers shooting and killing five villagers inside the church, while another said seven villagers were shot and killed by soldiers outside the church.

Al-Bassa's residents were expelled as part of the 1948 Palestinian expulsion and flight, and the village was completely destroyed by the Israelis with the exception of a few houses, a church, and a Muslim shrine.

At least 60 of the Christian villagers of Al-Bassa were taken by the Haganah to Mazra'a, where they remained for more than a year. Altogether 81 residents of al-Bassa became Israeli citizens as internally displaced Palestinians who lost their land rights and ended up in places like Nazareth. The only day on which Palestinians did not require a permit to travel during that period was Israel's Independence Day. On this day internally displaced Palestinians would visit their former villages. Wakim Wakim, an attorney from Al-Bassa and a leading member of the Association for the Defense of the Rights of the Internally Displaced explains: "The day when Israel celebrates is the day we mourn."

Most of the former villagers of al-Bassa (circa 95%) were pushed north towards Lebanon, concentrating in the Dbayeh refugee camp near Jounieh east of Beirut. Prior to and during the Lebanese Civil War, this camp suffered severe damage in the fighting and was largely destroyed, though it still has a population of some 4,233 people who are mostly Palestinian Christian refugees. Other former residents of Al-Bassa and the refugee camp in Lebanon ended up in Lansing, Michigan where they established an international village club and hold annual gatherings attended by over 300 people.

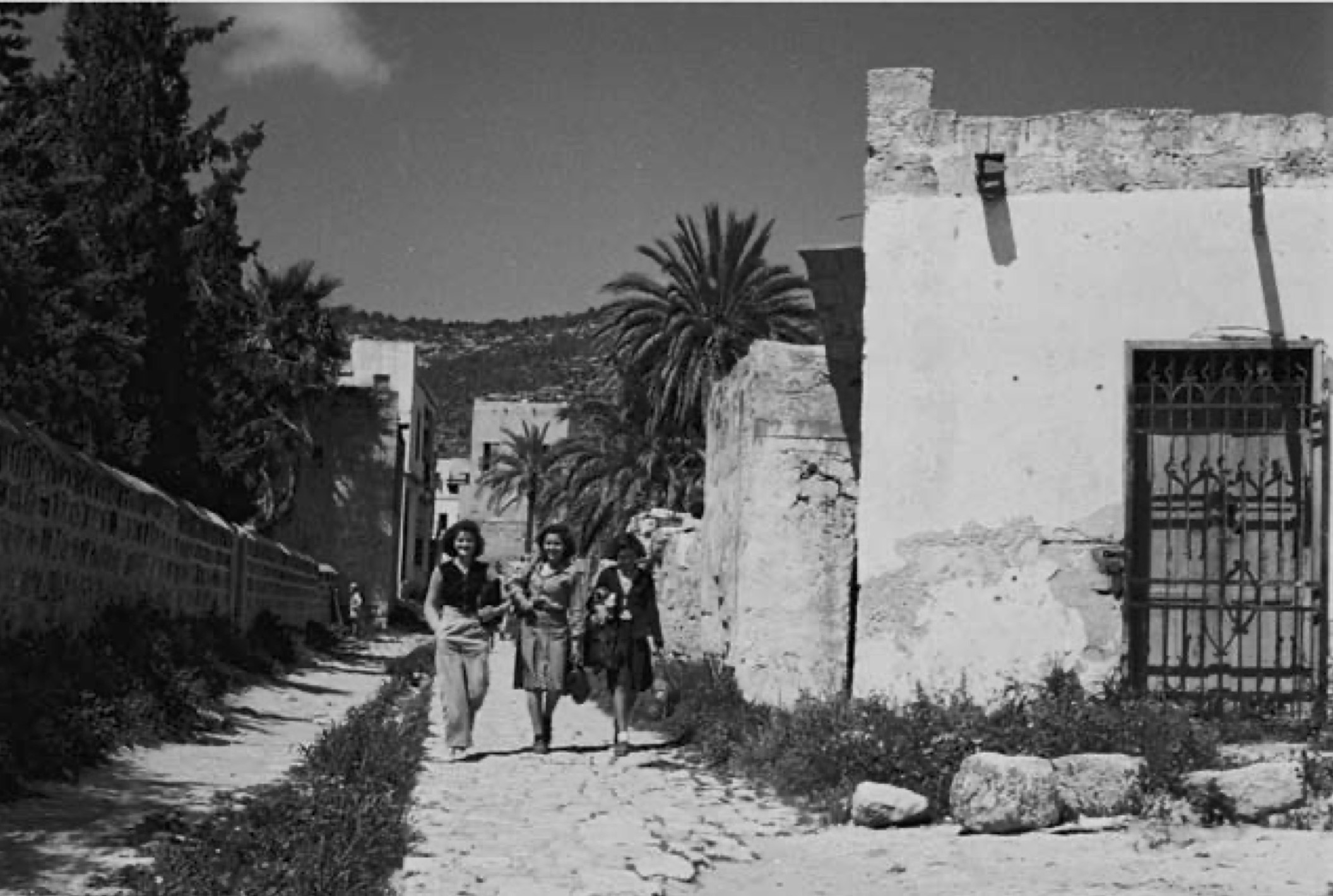
Al Bassa in 1950 after its depopulation, and subsequent repopulation with Israeli immigrants. According to Aron Shai, the picture shows "New immigrants on the way home from school in Betzet (formerly al-Bassa) near the Lebanese border"

The site was repopulated by Jewish immigrants and renamed as Betzet in 1951, and is today a part of the State of Israel.

The village was inspected in 1992, when it was found that although most of the houses of Al-Bassa had been destroyed, a number of historic buildings survived, including two churches, a mosque, and a maqam.

== Landmarks ==
=== Mosque ===
According to Petersen, the mosque appears to be a relatively modern construct, probably built in the early 1900s. It consists of a tall square room with a flat roof supported by iron girders. There is a cylindrical minaret at the north-east corner. There are tall pointed windows on all four sides, and a mihrab in the middle of the south wall. At the time of the inspection, 1992, the building was used as a sheep pen.

=== Maqam ===
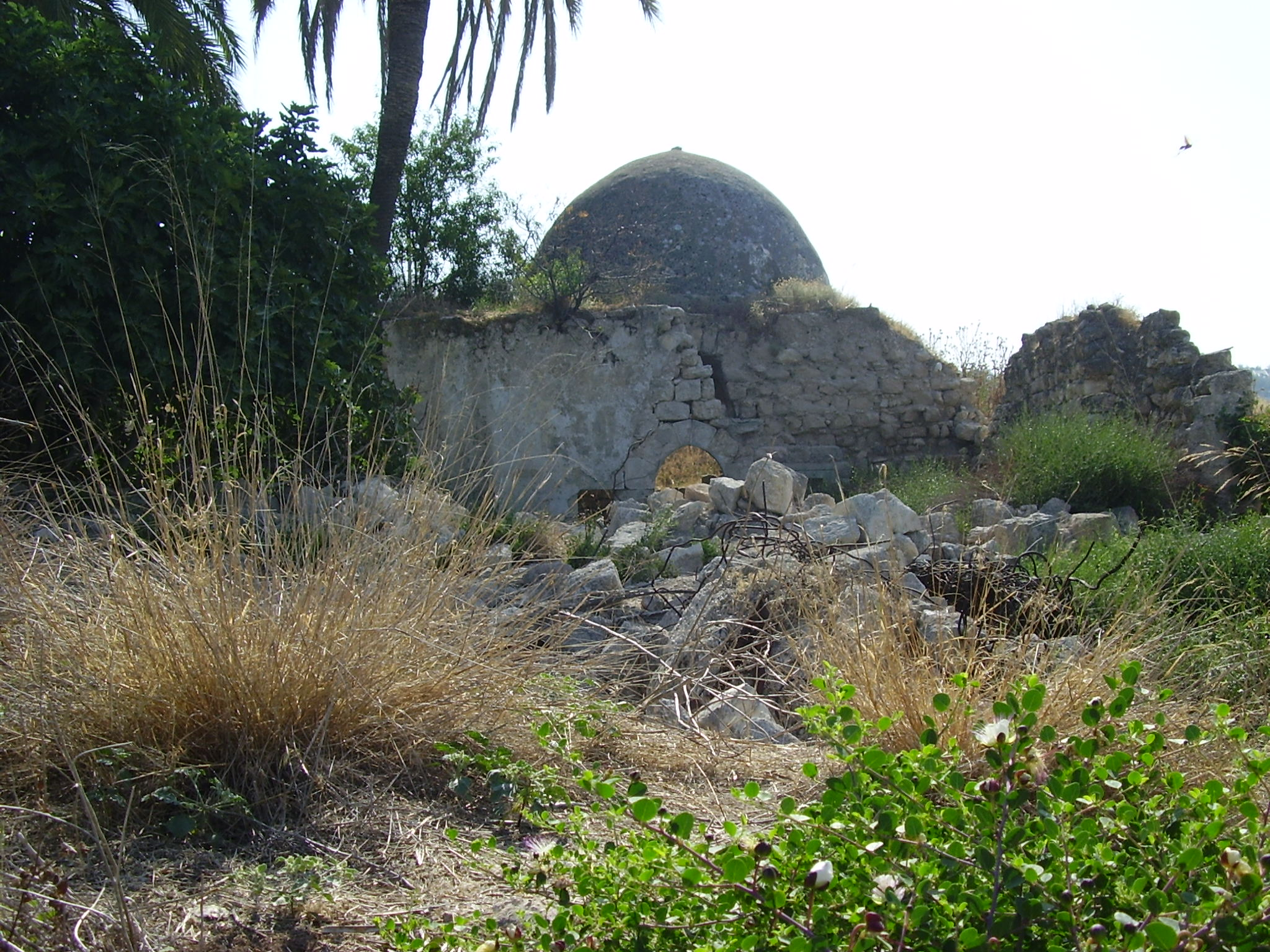
The maqam in 2008

The maqam is located about 20 meters east of the mosque. It consists of two parts: a walled courtyard, and a domed prayer room. In the courtyard there is a mihrab in the south wall, and a doorway in the east wall leads into the main prayer room. Pendentives springing from four thick piers support wide arches and the dome. In the middle of the south wall there is a mihrab, next to a simple minbar, made of four stone steps.

=== Khirbet Ma'sub ===
The site of Khirbet Ma'sub, immediately to the east of Bassa, is where the Phoenician Ma'sub inscription was found in the 1880s.

== Culture ==
Henry Baker Tristram during his 1863 visit to the village made a detailed description of the women's Palestinian costumes.

Quote from Tristram, 1863

[The women´s] dress was unlike any costume we had yet seen; consisting of rather tight blue cotton trousers tied at the ankle, slippers without stockings, a chemise of cotton, blue or white, rather open in front, and over this a long dress, like a cassock, open in front, with a girdle and short sleeves. This robe was plain, patched, or embroidered in the most fantastic and grotesque shapes, the triumph of El Bussah milliners being evidently to bring together in contrast as many colours as possible. The head-dress ...baffles my powers of description, but is very description, but is very interesting, as probably identical with that of the women of Galilee of old. [Such may Mary have worn, as she daily went to the well of Nazareth.] It is called the semadi, and consists of a cloth skull-cap, with a flap behind, all covered with coins -silver, but sometimes gold -and a fringe of coins suspended from it on the forehead. Round the face, from chin to crown, are two stout pads, by way of bonnet-cap, fastened at the top. But outside of these pads is attached a string of silver, not lengthwise, but solidly piled one on another, and hammered severally into a saucer-shape, with a hole drilled through the middle. They usually commence with some half-dozen Spanish dollars at the chin, gradually tapering up to small Turkish silver-pieces of the size of sixpences at the forehead. The weight is no trifle, and one little girl, whose head-gear was handed to me for examination in return for a present of needles, had £30 worth of silver round her cheeks. Many had frontlets of gold coins, and I saw one centre-piece on the fore-head of a sheikh's wife consisting of a Turkish £5 gold piece. All the young ladies thus carry their fortunes on their heads; and this jewelry is the peculium of the wife, and cannot be touched by her husband. An instance in which a Greek priest had insisted on the payment of his fees out of the head-dress of a widow has been recited to me as a case of grievous extortion.

— Henry Baker Tristram

Weir, after quoting what Tristram wrote about the head-dresses in Al-Bussah, notes that coin headdresses went out of use for daily wear in Galilee at the beginning of the 20th century, but continued to be worn by brides for their weddings.

== See also ==
- Depopulated Palestinian locations in Israel

== Bibliography ==
- Avi-Yonah, M. (1976). "Gazetteer of Roman Palestine". Qedem. 5: 42. ISSN 0333-5844. JSTOR 43587090.
- Barron, J.B., ed. (1923). Palestine: Report and General Abstracts of the Census of 1922. Government of Palestine.
- Benveniśtî, M. (2000). Sacred landscape: the buried history of the Holy Land since 1948. University of California Press. ISBN 978-0-520-23422-2. (p. 333)
- Cohen, A. (1973), Palestine in the Eighteenth Century: Patterns of Government and Administration. Hebrew University, Jerusalem. Cited in Khalidi, (1992)
- Conder, C.R.; Kitchener, H.H. (1881). The Survey of Western Palestine: Memoirs of the Topography, Orography, Hydrography, and Archaeology. Vol. 1. London: Committee of the Palestine Exploration Fund. ( p.156 )
- Department of Statistics (1945). Village Statistics, April, 1945. Government of Palestine.
- Ellenblum, R. (2003). Frankish Rural Settlement in the Latin Kingdom of Jerusalem. Cambridge University Press. ISBN 9780521521871.
- Grootkerk, Salomon E. (2000). Ancient sites in Galilee: a toponymic gazetteer (Illustrated ed.). BRILL. ISBN 978-90-04-11535-4.
- Hadawi, S. (1970). Village Statistics of 1945: A Classification of Land and Area ownership in Palestine. Palestine Liberation Organization Research Center. Archived from the original on 2018-12-08.
- Hassoun, Rosina J. (2003). Arab Americans in Michigan (Illustrated ed.). MSU Press. ISBN 978-0-87013-667-2.
- Hütteroth, W.-D.; Abdulfattah, K. (1977). Historical Geography of Palestine, Transjordan and Southern Syria in the Late 16th Century. Erlanger Geographische Arbeiten, Sonderband 5. Erlangen, Germany: Vorstand der Fränkischen Geographischen Gesellschaft. ISBN 3-920405-41-2.
- Karmon, Y. (1960). "An Analysis of Jacotin's Map of Palestine" (PDF). Israel Exploration Journal. 10 (3, 4): 155–173, 244–253. Archived from the original (PDF) on 2019-12-22.
- Khalidi, W. (1992). All That Remains: The Palestinian Villages Occupied and Depopulated by Israel in 1948. Washington D.C.: Institute for Palestine Studies. ISBN 0-88728-224-5.
- Mansour, Atallah (2004). Narrow Gate Churches: The Christian Presence in the Holy Land Under Muslim and Jewish Rule. Hope Publishing House. ISBN 978-1-932717-02-0.
- Masalha, N.; Said, E.W. (2005). Catastrophe remembered: Palestine, Israel and the internal refugees : essays in memory of Edward W. Said (1935-2003). Zed Books. ISBN 978-1-84277-623-0.
- Mills, E., ed. (1932). Census of Palestine 1931. Population of Villages, Towns and Administrative Areas. Jerusalem: Government of Palestine.
- Morris, B. (2004). The Birth of the Palestinian Refugee Problem Revisited. Cambridge University Press. ISBN 978-0-521-00967-6.
- Neubauer, A. (1868). La géographie du Talmud : mémoire couronné par l'Académie des inscriptions et belles-lettres (in French). Paris: Lévy.
- Iliffe, J.H. (1934). "A Tomb at el Bassa c. AD 396". Quarterly of the Department of Antiquities in Palestine. 3: 81–91.
- Palmer, E.H. (1881). The Survey of Western Palestine: Arabic and English Name Lists Collected During the Survey by Lieutenants Conder and Kitchener, R. E. Transliterated and Explained by E.H. Palmer. Committee of the Palestine Exploration Fund.
- Petersen, Andrew (2001). A Gazetteer of Buildings in Muslim Palestine (British Academy Monographs in Archaeology). Vol. 1. Oxford University Press. ISBN 978-0-19-727011-0. Archived from the original on 2021-05-29.
- Pringle, D. (1997). Secular buildings in the Crusader Kingdom of Jerusalem: an archaeological gazetteer (Illustrated ed.). Cambridge University Press. ISBN 978-0-521-46010-1.
- Quigley, J.B. (2005). The case for Palestine: an international law perspective (2nd, revised ed.). Duke University Press. ISBN 978-0-8223-3539-9.
- RHC Or: Recueil des historiens des croisades : Historiens orientaux (in French). Vol. 4. Paris: Imprimerie nationale. 1898.
- Rhode, H. (1979). Administration and Population of the Sancak of Safed in the Sixteenth Century. Columbia University. Archived from the original on 2020-03-01.
- Schumacher, G. (1888). "Population list of the Liwa of Akka". Quarterly Statement - Palestine Exploration Fund. 20: 169–191.
- Strehlke, E., ed. (1869). Tabulae Ordinis Theutonici ex tabularii regii Berolinensis codice potissimum. Berlin: Weidmanns.
- Tristram, H.B. (1865). Land of Israel, A Journal of travel in Palestine, undertaken with special reference to its physical character. London: Society for Promoting Christian Knowledge.
- Velde, van de, C.W.M. (1854). Narrative of a journey through Syria and Palestine in 1851 and 1852. Vol. 1. William Blackwood and son.
- Weir, Shelagh (1989). Palestinian Costume. British Museum Publications Ltd. ISBN 0-7141-2517-2.
- Whitehouse, D.; Corning Museum of Glass (2002). Roman glass in the Corning Museum of Glass, Volume 2 (Illustrated ed.). Hudson Hills. ISBN 978-0-87290-150-6.

== External links and references ==
- Welcome to al-Bassa
- al-Bassa, Zochrot
- Survey of Western Palestine, Map 3: IAA, Wikimedia commons
- Al-Bassa at Khalil Sakakini Cultural Center
- Al-Bassah Dr. Moslih Kanaaneh
- Al-Bassa International Association - an "international forum" for former residents of al-Bassa.
