= Bilateral aviation safety agreement =

A bilateral aviation safety agreement (BASA) is an agreement that provides for civil aviation certifications to be shared between two countries.

The European Aviation Safety Agency (EASA) currently maintains BASAs with the FAA, the Transport Canada Civil Aviation (TCCA), the National Civil Aviation Agency of Brazil (ANAC), and the Civil Aviation Administration of China (CAAC).

The FAA has had a BASA with TCCA since 12 June 2000. This particular BASA has in Article 5 a sixty-day cancellation notice period.

The Civil Aviation Authority of the United Kingdom has had a BASA with the TCCA since 1 January 2021.
