= ISO 639:k =

List of ISO 639-3 language codes starting with K

This is a list of ISO 639-3 language codes starting with K.

Index | a | b | c | d | e | f | g | h | i | j | k | l | m | n | o | p | q | r | s | t | u | v | w | x | y | z

Abbreviations are used in the table as follows:

- Scope: I = individual language, M = macrolanguage, S = special code
- Type: C = constructed, E = extinct (in recent times), H = historical (distinct from its modern form), L = living, S = special code

Deprecated codes are enclosed in (parentheses).

The column Family contains the generic English name of the language's family or macrolanguage.

ISO 639 codes			Scope/Type	Family	Language names	
639-3	639-1	639-2/B	Scope/Type	Family	Native	ISO name
kaa		kaa	I/L		Қарақалпақ	Karakalpak; Kara-Kalpak
kab		kab	I/L		Taqbaylit	Kabyle
kac		kac	I/L	Sino-Tibetan	Jinghpaw ga; ဂျိန်ဖော့	Jingpho; Kachin
kad			I/L			Adara
kae			I/E			Ketangalan
kaf			I/L			Katso
kag			I/L			Kajaman
kah			I/L			Kara (Central African Republic)
kai			I/L			Karekare
kaj			I/L		Kaje	Jju
kak			I/L			Kalanguya; Kayapa Kallahan
kal	kl	kal	I/L	Eskimo–Aleut	kalaallisut	Greenlandic; Kalaallisut
kam		kam	I/L			Kamba (Kenya)
kan	kn	kan	I/L	Dravidian	ಕನ್ನಡ	Kannada
kao			I/L			Xaasongaxango
kap			I/L		Бежкьа	Bezhta
kaq			I/L	Panoan		Capanahua
kas	ks	kas	I/L	Indo-European	كشميري	Kashmiri
kat	ka	geo	I/L	Kartvelian	ქართული	Georgian
kau	kr	kau	M/L	Nilo-Saharan	kanuri	Kanuri
kav			I/L			Katukína
kaw		kaw	I/H		Bhāṣa Kawi	Kawi
kax			I/L			Kao
kay			I/L			Kamayurá
kaz	kk	kaz	I/L	Turkic	Қазақша	Kazakh
kba			I/E			Kalarko
kbb			I/E			Kaxuiâna
kbc			I/L			Kadiwéu
kbd		kbd	I/L		къэбэрдеибзэ	Kabardian
kbe			I/L			Kanju
(kbf)			I/E	spurious language		Kakauhua
kbg			I/L			Khamba
kbh			I/L			Camsá
kbi			I/L	Austronesian		Kaptiau
kbj			I/L			Kari
kbk			I/L			Grass Koiari
kbl			I/L			Kanembu
kbm			I/L			Iwal
kbn			I/L			Kare (Central African Republic)
kbo			I/L			Keliko
kbp			I/L			Kabiyè
kbq			I/L			Kamano
kbr			I/L			Kafa
kbs			I/L			Kande
kbt			I/L			Abadi
kbu			I/L			Kabutra
kbv			I/L			Dera (Indonesia)
kbw			I/L			Kaiep
kbx			I/L			Ap Ma
kby			I/L			Manga Kanuri
kbz			I/L	Afro-Asiatic	Karfa	Duhwa
kca			I/L		ханты	Khanty
kcb			I/L			Kawacha
kcc			I/L			Lubila
kcd			I/L			Ngkâlmpw Kanum
kce			I/L			Kaivi
kcf			I/L			Ukaan
kcg			I/L			Tyap
kch			I/L			Vono
kci			I/L	Niger–Congo?	Nghan	Ngyian; Kamantan
kcj			I/L			Kobiana
kck			I/L			Kalanga
kcl			I/L			Kala; Kela (Papua New Guinea)
kcm			I/L			Gula (Central African Republic)
kcn			I/L			Nubi
kco			I/L			Kinalakna
kcp			I/L			Kanga
kcq			I/L			Kamo
kcr			I/L			Katla
kcs			I/L			Koenoem
kct			I/L			Kaian
kcu			I/L			Kami (Tanzania)
kcv			I/L			Kete
kcw			I/L			Kabwari
kcx			I/L			Kachama-Ganjule
kcy			I/L			Korandje
kcz			I/L			Konongo
kda			I/E			Worimi
kdc			I/L			Kutu
kdd			I/L			Yankunytjatjara
kde			I/L			Makonde
kdf			I/L			Mamusi
kdg			I/L			Seba
kdh			I/L			Tem
kdi			I/L			Kumam
kdj			I/L			Karamojong
kdk			I/L			Kwényi; Numèè
kdl			I/L			Tsikimba
kdm			I/L			Kagoma
kdn			I/L			Kunda
kdp			I/L			Kaningdon-Nindem
kdq			I/L	Sino-Tibetan		Koch
kdr			I/L		Къарай	Karaim
(kds)			I/L			Lahu Shi
kdt			I/L			Kuy
kdu			I/L			Kadaru
(kdv)			I/L			Kado
kdw			I/L			Koneraw
kdx			I/L			Kam
kdy			I/L			Keder; Keijar
kdz			I/L			Kwaja
kea			I/L		kriolu kabuverdianu	Kabuverdianu
keb			I/L			Kélé
kec			I/L			Keiga
ked			I/L			Kerewe
kee			I/L			Eastern Keres
kef			I/L			Kpessi
keg			I/L			Tese
keh			I/L			Keak
kei			I/L			Kei
kej			I/L			Kadar
kek			I/L			Kekchí
kel			I/L			Kela (Democratic Republic of Congo)
kem			I/L			Kemak
ken			I/L			Kenyang
keo			I/L			Kakwa
kep			I/L			Kaikadi
keq			I/L			Kamar
ker			I/L			Kera
kes			I/L			Kugbo
ket			I/L			Ket
keu			I/L			Akebu
kev			I/L			Kanikkaran
kew			I/L			West Kewa
kex			I/L			Kukna
key			I/L			Kupia
kez			I/L			Kukele
kfa			I/L	Dravidian	ಕೊಡವ ತಕ್ಕ್	Kodava
kfb			I/L			Northwestern Kolami
kfc			I/L			Konda-Dora
kfd			I/L			Korra Koraga
kfe			I/L			Kota (India)
kff			I/L			Koya
kfg			I/L			Kudiya
kfh			I/L			Kurichiya
kfi			I/L	Dravidian		Kannada Kurumba
kfj			I/L			Kemiehua
kfk			I/L	Sino-Tibetan	𑚊𑚝𑚦𑚤𑚮𑚎𑚨𑚶𑚊𑚛	Kinnauri
kfl			I/L			Kung
kfm			I/L			Khunsari
kfn			I/L			Kuk
kfo			I/L	Niger–Congo?		Koro (Côte d'Ivoire)
kfp			I/L			Korwa
kfq			I/L			Korku
kfr			I/L		કચ્છી	Kachhi; Kutchi
kfs			I/L			Bilaspuri
kft			I/L			Kanjari
kfu			I/L			Katkari
kfv			I/L			Kurmukar
kfw			I/L			Kharam Naga
kfx			I/L			Kullu Pahari
kfy			I/L	Indo-European	कुमाऊँनी	Kumaoni
kfz			I/L			Koromfé
kga			I/L	Niger–Congo?		Koyaga
kgb			I/L			Kawe
(kgc)			I/L			Kasseng
(kgd)			I/L			Kataang
kge			I/L			Komering
kgf			I/L			Kube
kgg			I/L			Kusunda
(kgh)			I/L			Upper Tanudan Kalinga
kgi			I/L			Selangor Sign Language
kgj			I/L	Sino-Tibetan	मगर ढुट	Gamale Kham
kgk			I/L			Kaiwá
kgl			I/E			Kunggari
(kgm)			I/E	spurious language		Karipúna
kgn			I/L			Karingani
kgo			I/L			Krongo
kgp			I/L	Macro-Jê	kanhgág	Kaingang
kgq			I/L			Kamoro
kgr			I/L			Abun
kgs			I/L			Kumbainggar
kgt			I/L			Somyev
kgu			I/L			Kobol
kgv			I/L			Karas
kgw			I/L			Karon Dori
kgx			I/L			Kamaru
kgy			I/L			Kyerung
kha		kha	I/L		Khasi	Khasi
khb			I/L			Lü
khc			I/L			Tukang Besi North
khd			I/L			Bädi Kanum
khe			I/L			Korowai
khf			I/L			Khuen
khg			I/L			Khams Tibetan
khh			I/L			Kehu
khj			I/L			Kuturmi
khk			I/L			Halh Mongolian
khl			I/L			Lusi
khm	km	khm	I/L	Austroasiatic	ខ្មែរ	Central Khmer; Khmer
khn			I/L			Khandesi
kho		kho	I/H			Khotanese; Sakan
khp			I/L			Kapauri; Kapori
khq			I/L			Koyra Chiini Songhay
khr			I/L			Kharia
khs			I/L			Kasua
kht			I/L			Khamti
khu			I/L			Nkhumbi
khv			I/L			Khvarshi
khw			I/L			Khowar
khx			I/L			Kanu
khy			I/L			Kele (Democratic Republic of Congo)
khz			I/L			Keapara
kia			I/L			Kim
kib			I/L			Koalib
kic			I/L		kikapú	Kickapoo
kid			I/L			Koshin
kie			I/L			Kibet
kif			I/L	Sino-Tibetan	मगर ढुट	Eastern Parbate Kham
kig			I/L			Kimaama; Kimaghima
kih			I/L			Kilmeri
kii			I/E			Kitsai
kij			I/L			Kilivila
kik	ki	kik	I/L	Niger–Congo	Gĩkũyũ	Gikuyu; Kikuyu
kil			I/L			Kariya
kim			I/L		Тоъфа	Karagas
kin	rw	kin	I/L	Niger–Congo	kinyaRwanda	Kinyarwanda
kio			I/L		Cáuijo̱:gà	Kiowa
kip			I/L	Sino-Tibetan	मगर ढुट	Sheshi Kham
kiq			I/L			Kosadle; Kosare
kir	ky	kir	I/L	Turkic	Кыргыз	Kirghiz; Kyrgyz
kis			I/L			Kis
kit			I/L			Agob
kiu			I/L			Kirmanjki (individual language)
kiv			I/L			Kimbu
kiw			I/L			Northeast Kiwai
kix			I/L			Khiamniungan Naga
kiy			I/L			Kirikiri
kiz			I/L			Kisi
kja			I/L			Mlap
kjb			I/L			Kanjobal; Q'anjob'al
kjc			I/L			Coastal Konjo
kjd			I/L			Southern Kiwai
kje			I/L			Kisar
(kjf)			I/L	spurious language		Khalaj
kjg			I/L			Khmu
kjh			I/L	Turkic	Хакас тілі	Khakas
kji			I/L			Zabana
kjj			I/L			Khinalugh
kjk			I/L			Highland Konjo
kjl			I/L	Sino-Tibetan	मगर ढुट	Western Parbate Kham
kjm			I/L			Kháng
kjn			I/L			Kunjen
kjo			I/L			Harijan Kinnauri
kjp			I/L			Pwo Eastern Karen
kjq			I/L			Western Keres
kjr			I/L			Kurudu
kjs			I/L			East Kewa
kjt			I/L			Phrae Pwo Karen
kju			I/L			Kashaya
kjv			I/H		Kajkavski	Kaikavian Literary Language
kjx			I/L			Ramopa
kjy			I/L			Erave
kjz			I/L			Bumthangkha
kka			I/L			Kakanda
kkb			I/L			Kwerisa
kkc			I/L			Odoodee
kkd			I/L			Kinuku
kke			I/L			Kakabe
kkf			I/L	Sino-Tibetan		Kalaktang Monpa
kkg			I/L			Mabaka Valley Kalinga
kkh			I/L			Khün
kki			I/L			Kagulu
kkj			I/L			Kako
kkk			I/L			Kokota
kkl			I/L			Kosarek Yale
kkm			I/L			Kiong
kkn			I/L			Kon Keu
kko			I/L			Karko
kkp			I/L			Gugubera; Koko-Bera
kkq			I/L			Kaeku
kkr			I/L			Kir-Balar
kks			I/L			Giiwo
kkt			I/L			Koi
kku			I/L			Tumi
kkv			I/L			Kangean
kkw			I/L			Teke-Kukuya
kkx			I/L			Kohin
kky			I/L			Guguyimidjir; Guugu Yimidhirr
kkz			I/L		Dene Dzage	Kaska
kla			I/E			Klamath-Modoc
klb			I/L			Kiliwa
klc			I/L			Kolbila
kld			I/L			Gamilaraay
kle			I/L			Kulung (Nepal)
klf			I/L			Kendeje
klg			I/L			Tagakaulo
klh			I/L			Weliki
kli			I/L			Kalumpang
klj			I/L		Qalayce	Khalaj
klk			I/L			Kono (Nigeria)
kll			I/L			Kagan Kalagan
klm			I/L			Migum
kln			M/L			Kalenjin
klo			I/L			Kapya
klp			I/L			Kamasa
klq			I/L			Rumu
klr			I/L	Sino-Tibetan	खालिङ	Khaling
kls			I/L			Kalasha
klt			I/L			Nukna
klu			I/L			Klao
klv			I/L			Maskelynes
klw			I/L			Lindu; Tado
klx			I/L			Koluwawa
kly			I/L			Kalao
klz			I/L			Kabola
kma			I/L			Konni
kmb		kmb	I/L			Kimbundu
kmc			I/L			Southern Dong
kmd			I/L			Majukayang Kalinga
kme			I/L			Bakole
kmf			I/L			Kare (Papua New Guinea)
kmg			I/L			Kâte
kmh			I/L			Kalam
kmi			I/L			Kami (Nigeria)
kmj			I/L			Kumarbhag Paharia
kmk			I/L			Limos Kalinga
kml			I/L			Tanudan Kalinga
kmm			I/L			Kom (India)
kmn			I/L			Awtuw
kmo			I/L			Kwoma
kmp			I/L			Gimme
kmq			I/L			Kwama
kmr			I/L			Northern Kurdish
kms			I/L			Kamasau
kmt			I/L			Kemtuik
kmu			I/L			Kanite
kmv			I/L			Karipúna Creole French
kmw			I/L			Komo (Democratic Republic of Congo)
kmx			I/L			Waboda
kmy			I/L			Koma
kmz			I/L			Khorasani Turkish
kna			I/L			Dera (Nigeria)
knb			I/L			Lubuagan Kalinga
knc			I/L			Central Kanuri
knd			I/L			Konda
kne			I/L			Kankanaey
knf			I/L			Mankanya
kng			I/L			Koongo
(knh)			I/L	spurious language		Kayan River Kenyah
kni			I/L			Kanufi
knj			I/L			Western Kanjobal
knk			I/L			Kuranko
knl			I/L			Keninjal
knm			I/L			Kanamarí
knn			I/L		ಕೊಂಕಣಿ	Konkani (individual language)
kno			I/L			Kono (Sierra Leone)
knp			I/L			Kwanja
knq			I/L			Kintaq
knr			I/L			Kaningra
kns			I/L			Kensiu
knt			I/L			Panoan Katukína
knu			I/L			Kono (Guinea)
knv			I/L			Tabo
knw			I/L			Kung-Ekoka
knx			I/L			Kendayan; Salako
kny			I/L			Kanyok
knz			I/L			Kalamsé
koa			I/L			Konomala
(kob)			I/L			Kohoroxitari
koc			I/E			Kpati
kod			I/L			Kodi
koe			I/L			Kacipo-Bale Suri
kof			I/E			Kubi
kog			I/L			Cogui; Kogi
koh			I/L			Koyo
koi			I/L		перым-коми	Komi-Permyak
(koj)			I/L			Sara Dunjo
kok		kok	M/L		कॊंकणि	Konkani (macrolanguage)
kol			I/L			Kol (Papua New Guinea)
kom	kv	kom	M/L	Uralic	коми	Komi
kon	kg	kon	M/L	Niger–Congo	Kikongo	Kongo
koo			I/L	Niger–Congo?	Olhukonzo	Konzo
kop			I/L			Waube
koq			I/L			Kota (Gabon)
kor	ko	kor	I/L	Koreanic	한국어	Korean
kos		kos	I/L		Kosrae	Kosraean
kot			I/L			Lagwan
kou			I/L			Koke
kov			I/L			Kudu-Camo
kow			I/L			Kugama
(kox)			I/E	spurious language		Coxima
koy			I/L			Koyukon
koz			I/L			Korak
kpa			I/L			Kutto
kpb			I/L			Mullu Kurumba
kpc			I/L			Curripaco
kpd			I/L			Koba
kpe		kpe	M/L		kpele	Kpelle
kpf			I/L			Komba
kpg			I/L			Kapingamarangi
kph			I/L			Kplang
kpi			I/L			Kofei
kpj			I/L			Karajá
kpk			I/L			Kpan
kpl			I/L			Kpala
kpm			I/L			Koho
kpn			I/E			Kepkiriwát
kpo			I/L		Akpɔssɔ	Ikposo
(kpp)			I/L			Paku Karen
kpq			I/L			Korupun-Sela
kpr			I/L			Korafe-Yegha
kps			I/L			Tehit
kpt			I/L			Karata
kpu			I/L			Kafoa
kpv			I/L			Komi-Zyrian
kpw			I/L			Kobon
kpx			I/L			Mountain Koiali
kpy			I/L		нымылг'эн йилыйыл, чав'чывэн йилыйил	Koryak
kpz			I/L			Kupsabiny
kqa			I/L			Mum
kqb			I/L			Kovai
kqc			I/L			Doromu-Koki
kqd			I/L			Koy Sanjaq Surat
kqe			I/L			Kalagan
kqf			I/L			Kakabai
kqg			I/L			Khe
kqh			I/L			Kisankasa
kqi			I/L			Koitabu
kqj			I/L			Koromira
kqk			I/L			Kotafon Gbe
kql			I/L			Kyenele
kqm			I/L			Khisa
kqn			I/L			Kaonde
kqo			I/L			Eastern Krahn
kqp			I/L			Kimré
kqq			I/L			Krenak
kqr			I/L			Kimaragang
kqs			I/L			Northern Kissi
kqt			I/L			Klias River Kadazan
kqu			I/E			Seroa
kqv			I/L			Okolod
kqw			I/L			Kandas
kqx			I/L			Mser
kqy			I/L			Koorete
kqz			I/E			Korana
kra			I/L			Kumhali
krb			I/E			Karkin
krc		krc	I/L		Къарачай-Малкъар	Karachay-Balkar
krd			I/L			Kairui-Midiki
kre			I/L	Macro-Jê	panãra pẽẽ	Panará
krf			I/L			Koro (Vanuatu)
(krg)			I/L			North Korowai
krh			I/L			Kurama
kri			I/L			Krio
krj			I/L			Kinaray-A
krk			I/E			Kerek
krl		krl	I/L		karjala	Karelian
(krm)			I/L			Krim
krn			I/L			Sapo
krp			I/L	Atlantic–Congo	Durop	Durop
(krq)			I/L			Krui
krr			I/L			Krung
krs			I/L			Gbaya (Sudan)
krt			I/L			Tumari Kanuri
kru		kru	I/L			Kurukh
krv			I/L	Austroasiatic		Kavet
krw			I/L			Western Krahn
krx			I/L			Karon
kry			I/L			Kryts
krz			I/L			Sota Kanum
(ksa)			I/L			Shuwa-Zamani
ksb			I/L			Shambala
ksc			I/L			Southern Kalinga
ksd			I/L			Kuanua
kse			I/L			Kuni
ksf			I/L			Bafia
ksg			I/L			Kusaghe
ksh			I/L		Kölsch	Colognian
ksi			I/L			I'saka; Krisa
ksj			I/L			Uare
ksk			I/L		Kaáⁿze	Kansa
ksl			I/L			Kumalu
ksm			I/L			Kumba
ksn			I/L			Kasiguranin
kso			I/L			Kofa
ksp			I/L			Kaba
ksq			I/L			Kwaami
ksr			I/L			Borong
kss			I/L			Southern Kisi
kst			I/L			Winyé
ksu			I/L			Khamyang
ksv			I/L			Kusu
ksw			I/L	Sino-Tibetan	ကညီကျိာ်	S'gaw Karen
ksx			I/L			Kedang
ksy			I/L			Kharia Thar
ksz			I/L			Kodaku
kta			I/L			Katua
ktb			I/L			Kambaata
ktc			I/L			Kholok
ktd			I/L			Kokata; Kukatha
kte			I/L			Nubri
ktf			I/L			Kwami
ktg			I/E			Kalkutung
kth			I/L			Karanga
kti			I/L			North Muyu
ktj			I/L			Plapo Krumen
ktk			I/E			Kaniet
ktl			I/L			Koroshi
ktm			I/L			Kurti
ktn			I/L			Karitiâna
kto			I/L			Kuot
ktp			I/L			Kaduo
ktq			I/E			Katabaga
(ktr)			I/L			Kota Marudu Tinagas
kts			I/L			South Muyu
ktt			I/L			Ketum
ktu			I/L			Kituba (Democratic Republic of Congo)
ktv			I/L			Eastern Katu
ktw			I/E			Kato
ktx			I/L			Kaxararí
kty			I/L			Kango (Bas-Uélé District)
ktz			I/L	Kxʼa	ǃXun	Juǀʼhoan; Juǀʼhoansi
kua	kj	kua	I/L	Niger–Congo	kuanyama	Kuanyama; Kwanyama
kub			I/L			Kutep
kuc			I/L			Kwinsu
kud			I/L			'Auhelawa
kue			I/L			Kuman (Papua New Guinea)
kuf			I/L			Western Katu
kug			I/L			Kupa
kuh			I/L			Kushi
kui			I/L			Kalapalo; Kuikúro-Kalapálo
kuj			I/L			Kuria
kuk			I/L			Kepo'
kul			I/L			Kulere
kum		kum	I/L		Къумукъ	Kumyk
kun			I/L			Kunama
kuo			I/L			Kumukio
kup			I/L			Kunimaipa
kuq			I/L	Pano-Tacanan	Jaũn Àvo	Karipuna
kur	ku	kur	M/L	Indo-European	Kurdî	Kurdish
kus			I/L			Kusaal
kut		kut	I/L	Language isolate	Ktunaxa	Ktunaxa
kuu			I/L			Upper Kuskokwim
kuv			I/L			Kur
kuw			I/L			Kpagua
kux			I/L			Kukatja
kuy			I/L			Kuuku-Ya'u
kuz			I/E			Kunza
kva			I/L			Bagvalal
kvb			I/L			Kubu
kvc			I/L			Kove
kvd			I/L			Kui (Indonesia)
kve			I/L			Kalabakan
kvf			I/L			Kabalai
kvg			I/L			Kuni-Boazi
kvh			I/L			Komodo
kvi			I/L			Kwang
kvj			I/L			Psikye
kvk			I/L			Korean Sign Language
kvl			I/L			Kayaw
kvm			I/L			Kendem
kvn			I/L			Border Kuna
kvo			I/L			Dobel
kvp			I/L			Kompane
kvq			I/L			Geba Karen
kvr			I/L			Kerinci
(kvs)			I/L			Kunggara
kvt			I/L			Lahta; Lahta Karen
kvu			I/L			Yinbaw Karen
kvv			I/L			Kola
kvw			I/L			Wersing
kvx			I/L			Parkari Koli
kvy			I/L			Yintale; Yintale Karen
kvz			I/L			Tsakwambo; Tsaukambo
kwa			I/L			Dâw
kwb			I/L			Kwa
kwc			I/L			Likwala
kwd			I/L			Kwaio
kwe			I/L			Kwerba
kwf			I/L			Kwara'ae
kwg			I/L			Sara Kaba Deme
kwh			I/L			Kowiai
kwi			I/L			Awa-Cuaiquer
kwj			I/L			Kwanga
kwk			I/L	Wakashan	Kwak̓wala	Kwak'wala; Kwakiutl
kwl			I/L			Kofyar
kwm			I/L			Kwambi
kwn			I/L			Kwangali
kwo			I/L			Kwomtari
kwp			I/L			Kodia
(kwq)			I/L			Kwak
kwr			I/L			Kwer
kws			I/L			Kwese
kwt			I/L			Kwesten
kwu			I/L			Kwakum
kwv			I/L			Sara Kaba Náà
kww			I/L			Kwinti
kwx			I/L			Khirwar
kwy			I/L			San Salvador Kongo
kwz			I/E			Kwadi
kxa			I/L			Kairiru
kxb			I/L			Krobu
kxc			I/L			Khonso; Konso
kxd			I/L			Brunei
(kxe)			I/L			Kakihum
kxf			I/L			Manumanaw; Manumanaw Karen
(kxg)			I/L			Katingan
kxh			I/L			Karo (Ethiopia)
kxi			I/L			Keningau Murut
kxj			I/L			Kulfa
kxk			I/L			Zayein Karen
(kxl)			I/L			Nepali Kurux
kxm			I/L		ខ្មែរលើ	Northern Khmer
kxn			I/L			Kanowit-Tanjong Melanau
kxo			I/E			Kanoé
kxp			I/L			Koli, Wadiyara
kxq			I/L			Smärky Kanum
kxr			I/L			Koro (Papua New Guinea)
kxs			I/L			Kangjia
kxt			I/L			Koiwat
(kxu)			I/L			Kui (India)
kxv			I/L			Kuvi
kxw			I/L			Konai
kxx			I/L			Likuba
kxy			I/L			Kayong
kxz			I/L			Kerewo
kya			I/L			Kwaya
kyb			I/L			Butbut Kalinga
kyc			I/L			Kyaka
kyd			I/L			Karey
kye			I/L			Krache
kyf			I/L			Kouya
kyg			I/L			Keyagana
kyh			I/L			Karok
kyi			I/L			Kiput
kyj			I/L			Karao
kyk			I/L			Kamayo
kyl			I/L			Kalapuya
kym			I/L	spurious language		Kpatili
kyn			I/L			Northern Binukidnon
kyo			I/L			Kelon
kyp			I/L			Kang
kyq			I/L			Kenga
kyr			I/L			Kuruáya
kys			I/L			Baram Kayan
kyt			I/L			Kayagar
kyu			I/L			Western Kayah
kyv			I/L			Kayort
kyw			I/L			Kudmali
kyx			I/L			Rapoisi
kyy			I/L			Kambaira
kyz			I/L			Kayabí
kza			I/L			Western Karaboro
kzb			I/L			Kaibobo
kzc			I/L			Bondoukou Kulango
kzd			I/L			Kadai
kze			I/L			Kosena
kzf			I/L			Da'a Kaili
kzg			I/L			Kikai
(kzh)			I/L			Kenuzi-Dongola
kzi			I/L			Kelabit
(kzj)			I/L			Coastal Kadazan
kzk			I/E			Kazukuru
kzl			I/L			Kayeli
kzm			I/L			Kais
kzn			I/L			Kokola
kzo			I/L			Kaningi
kzp			I/L			Kaidipang
kzq			I/L			Kaike
kzr			I/L			Karang
kzs			I/L			Sugut Dusun
(kzt)			I/L			Tambunan Dusun
kzu			I/L			Kayupulau
kzv			I/L			Komyandaret
kzw			I/E			Karirí-Xocó
kzx			I/E			Kamarian
kzy			I/L			Kango (Tshopo District)
kzz			I/L			Kalabra

== Sources ==
- "ISO 639-2 Registration Authority". Library of Congress.
- "ISO 639-3 Registration Authority". SIL International.
- Lewis, M. Paul; Simons, Gary F.; Fennig, Charles D., eds. (2016). "Ethnologue: Languages of the World" (19th ed.). Dallas, Texas: SIL International.
