= MCI =

MCI or mci may refer to:

== Organizations ==
=== Companies ===
- MCI Communications, originally Microwave Communications Inc., a corporation that operated as MCI from 1963 to 1998
  - MCI Inc., formerly called WorldCom, which acquired MCI Communications, and was later acquired by Verizon Communications
- MCI (recording studio gear), a manufacturer of multi-track audio tape recorders and mixing consoles for professional studio recording (officially Music Center Incorporated, later Music Consultants Incorporated)
- Mobile Telecommunication Company of Iran, the largest mobile phone operator in Iran
- Motor Coach Industries, a coach/bus manufacturing company
- Music Collection International, the music division of Video Collection International
- MCI, Frank Farian's record label

=== Education ===
- Maine Central Institute, a boarding school in Maine, United States
- Malvern Collegiate Institute, a secondary school in Toronto, Ontario, Canada
- Marine Corps Institute, a coursework of Marine Corps education and training programs
- Martingrove Collegiate Institute, a secondary school in Toronto, Ontario, Canada
- MCI Management Center Innsbruck, a privately organized business school in Innsbruck, Austria
- Medical Council of India, a former statutory body for establishing uniform and high standards of medical education in India
- Mennonite Collegiate Institute, a private religious school in Gretna, Southern Manitoba
- Middlefield Collegiate Institute, a secondary school in Markham, Ontario, Canada
- Museum Conservation Institute, of the Smithsonian Institution

=== Other organizations ===
- Ministry of Communications and Information, a ministry of the Government of Singapore
- Motek Cultural Initiative, a Toronto-based nonprofit organization promoting Israeli music and culture

== Science and technology ==
- Millicurie (mCi), 1/1000 of a curie, a non-SI unit of radioactivity
- Megacurie (MCi), 1,000,000 times a curie, a non-SI unit of radioactivity
- Macroinvertebrate Community Index, an index where the presence or lack of macroinvertebrates is used for monitoring stream health in New Zealand
- Magnetic current imaging, using a scanning SQUID microscope
- Malicious caller identification, a type of enhanced telephone service
- Mass-casualty incident, a medical emergency involving more patients than can be easily handled by the crews initially assigned to the incident
- Media Control Interface, an API for controlling multimedia peripherals connected to a Microsoft Windows or OS/2 computer
- Meta-circular evaluator, in computing
- Methylchloroisothiazolinone, in chemistry
- Mild cognitive impairment, a neurological affliction often associated with Alzheimer's disease
- Modulation contrast imaging, a term related to optical transfer function

== Art, entertainment, and media ==
- MasterChef Indonesia, an Indonesian televised cooking competition

== Other uses ==
- 1101, in Roman numerals
- Kansas City International Airport (IATA code), Missouri, United States
- Meal, Combat, Individual ration, the successor to the U.S. Army C-ration
- Michigan City station (Amtrak code), Indiana, United States
- Miss Chinese International Pageant, an annual pageant for international women of Chinese descent
- Monetary conditions index, a macroeconomic index number relevant for monetary policy
- Manchester City F.C., abbreviated as MCI
- Mese language, an ISO 639-3 code
- Missing Children Incident, an event in the lore of Five Nights At Freddy's
