= Keiga people =

Keiga
Total population
- 6,072 (In 1987)

Regions with significant populations
- Sudan South Kordofan

Languages
- Keiga

Religion
- Sunni Islam

Related ethnic groups
- Kanga, Tulishi

The Keiga people are a sub-ethnic group of the Nuba peoples in the Nuba Mountains of South Kordofan state, in southern Sudan. They speak Keiga, which belongs to the Kadugli–Krongo language family.

The Keiga people live north and northwest of Kadugli in South Kordofan. Their tradition says that all Keiga communities originated from Kulu sub-hill in Keiga Tummero hill. From there, they gradually spread over the present Keiga territory, the four hill communities of Tummero, Luban, al-Khayl, and Dameik. The Keiga people practice farming in the rainy season and also raise cattle. They have been in competition for land with Arabs in the area, sometimes escalating into violence.

Keiga people live in two major areas. These areas are Ambong and Koolo. Those who live in Ambong named themselves Kayikang ma Ambong i.e. the Keiga of Ambong, while those who live in Koolo named themselves Kayikang n Koolo i.e. the Keiga of Koolo. The two groups speak the Keiga language with different accents and sometimes different words and phrases. The Keiga traditional name in the pluralized form is Kayigang, as Tayigang in the singular form. Alike many names in the Nuba Mountains, Kayigang was altered to be Keiga. Dameik is one of the Ambong villages with four hamlets. Historically its name was Roofik; which derived from the name of a Kamda place name (Leinya Ma Roofik) translated as the hill of Roofik. The Dameik Village lies in the Keiga Ambong area, but the people there commonly speak the Dameik dialect which is far closer to the Kamda language.

== See also ==
- Index: Nuba peoples
