= Krongo =

Krongo may be,

- the Krongo Nuba people
- the Krongo language
