= Somba language =

Somba language may refer to:

- Somba, a dialect of the Somba-Siawari language

== See also ==
- Somba, the people who speak the languages of the Eastern branch of the Oti–Volta languages
