= SEJ =

Sej or SEJ may refer to:

- Sene language, a possibly extinct Papuan language
- Social Europe Journal
- Society of Environmental Journalists
- Scottish Educational Journal
