= Tulishi people =

Tulishi
Total population
- 8,628 (In 1977)

Regions with significant populations
- Sudan South Kordofan

Languages
- Tulishi

Religion
- Animism and Sunni Islam

Related ethnic groups
- Kanga, Keiga

Tulisi is an ethnic group in Sudan. They speak Tulisi, a Kathu language, and live south of the Nuba Hills.
