= Nomu =

Nomu may refer to:

- Nomu, a 1974 Telugu devotional film
- Nomu language, a Papuan language of Morobe Province, Papua New Guinea
- "Nomu", a 2015 song by Toronto band Good Kid
- Nomu, the mindless "artificial human" creations from My Hero Academia
- Saudi Parallel Market, also known as Nomu
