= Nunzen, Papua New Guinea =

Nunzen
- Location within Papua New Guinea
- Coordinates: 6°08′33.1″S 147°37′48.7″E
- Country: Papua New Guinea
- Province: Morobe Province

Languages
  - Main languages: Tok Pisin, Ono, English
- Time zone: UTC+10 (AEST)

Nunzen is a village located on the northern coast of Huon Peninsula, Papua New Guinea. It is located in Sialum Rural LLG, Morobe Province.

== History ==
The town was occupied by Imperial Japanese forces during World War II until they were defeated in the Huon Peninsula Campaign. The village was the site of brief fighting in December 1943 as the Japanese 20th Division retreated toward Sio with the Australian 9th Division and Papuan Infantry Battalion in pursuit.

The head office of the Bakesu Revival Church is located in the neighborhood of Menyamen. The Bakesu Revival Church is an Ono-language Christian revival church which split from the Evangelical Lutheran Church of Papua New Guinea in 1988.
