= Mape language =

Papuan language

Mape
- Native to: Papua New Guinea
- Region: Huon Peninsula, Morobe Province
- Native speakers: (1,700 cited 2000 census)
- Language family: Trans–New Guinea: Finisterre–Huon; Huon; Eastern Huon; Mape

Language codes
- ISO 639-3: mlh
- Glottolog: mape1249
- ELP: Mape

Mape is a Papuan language spoken in Morobe Province, Papua New Guinea. Dialects are Mape, Fukac, Naga, Nigac; the latter two may be extinct.
