= Kadugli language =

Kadu language spoken in Sudan

Kadugli
- Central Kadu
- Native to: Sudan
- Region: South Kordofan
- Ethnicity: Kadugli people, Katcha, Damba, Tumma
- Native speakers: 75,000 (2004)
- Language family: Nilo-Saharan?: Kadugli–Krongo; Central; Kadugli
- Dialects: Kadugli; Katcha; Miri; Damba; Tumma
- Writing system: Latin

Language codes
- ISO 639-3: xtc
- Glottolog: katc1249

Kadugli, also Katcha-Kadugli-Miri or Central Kadu, is a Kadu language or dialect cluster of the Nilo-Saharan language family spoken in South Kordofan, Sudan. Stevenson treats the varieties as dialects of one language, and they share a single ISO code, though Schadeberg (1989) treats them as separate languages.

== Dialects ==
There are five commonly cited varieties. Three of them are rather divergent, on the verge of being distinct languages:

- Katcha (Tolubi, Dholubi)
- Kadugli proper (Dakalla, Talla, Dhalla, Toma Ma Dalla, Kudugli, Morta)
- Miri

However, they share a single orthography and use the same literacy materials (Ethnologue).

Of the two other commonly cited varieties, Damba is somewhat closer to Kadugli, while Tumma appears to be a (sub)dialect of Katcha.

Villages in which the dialects are spoken according to the 22nd edition of Ethnologue:

- Katcha dialect: Belanya, Dabakaya, Farouq, Kafina, Katcha, and Tuna villages
- Kadugli dialect: ’Daalimo, Kadugli, Kulba, Murta, Takko, and Thappare villages
- Miri dialect: Hayar al-Nimr, Kadoda, Kasari, Kuduru, Kya, Luba, Miri Bara, Miri Guwa, Nyimodu, Sogolle, Tulluk, and Umduiu villages

== Phonology ==
=== Consonants ===
		Labial	Dental/ Alveolar	Retroflex	Palatal	Velar	Glottal
Plosive	voiceless	p	t̪	ʈ	c	k	(ʔ)
Plosive	voiced	(b)			ɟ		
Plosive	implosive	ɓ	ɗ				
Fricative		f	s				
Nasal		m	n		ɲ	ŋ	
Trill			r				
Approximant		w	l		j		

- [b] is heard as an allophone of /p/.

=== Vowels ===
	+ATR		-ATR		
	Front	Back	Front	Central	Back
Close	i	u	ɪ		ʊ
Mid		o	ɛ		ɔ
Open				a	
