= Huon languages =

Language family spoken in Papua New Guinea

Huon
- Geographic distribution: Huon Peninsula, Papua New Guinea
- Linguistic classification: Trans–New Guinea: Finisterre–Huon; Huon
- Subdivisions: Eastern; Western

Language codes
- ISO 639-3: –
- Glottolog: huon1246

The Huon languages are a language family, spoken on the Huon Peninsula of Papua New Guinea, that was classified within the original Trans–New Guinea (TNG) proposal, and William A. Foley considers their TNG identity to be established. They share with the Finisterre languages a small closed class of verbs taking pronominal object prefixes some of which are cognate across both families (Suter 2012), strong morphological evidence that they are related.

== Internal structure ==
Huon and Finisterre, and the connection between them, were identified by Kenneth McElhanon (1967, 1970). They are clearly valid language families. Huon contains two clear branches, Eastern and Western. The Western languages allow more consonants in syllable-final position (p, t, k, m, n, ŋ), while the Eastern languages have neutralized those distinctions to two, the glottal stop (written c) and the velar nasal (McElhanon 1974: 17). Beyond that, classification is based on lexicostatistics, which provides less precise classification results.

- Huon family
  - Eastern Huon branch
    - Huon Tip
      - Southeast Huon: Kâte, Mape
      - Sene
      - Masaweng River: Migabac, Momare
    - Kovai
    - Tobo-Kube
    - Dedua
  - Western Huon branch
    - Burum (Mindik), Borong (Kosorong)
    - Kinalakna, Kumokio
    - Mese, Nabak
    - Komba, Selepet–Timbe
    - Nomu
    - Ono
    - Sialum

Kâte is the local lingua franca.
