= Kanga people =

Kanga
Regions with significant populations
- Sudan South Kordofan

Languages
- Kanga

Religion
- Christianity

Related ethnic groups
- Keiga, Tulishi

Kanga is an ethnic group of Sudan. They numbered around 8,000 thousand in 1989. They live in Sudan in the Nuba Mountains Southwest of Kadugli and belong to the Nuba. The Kanga speak Kanga, a Nilo-Saharan language.
