= Kaba So language =

Bongo–Bagirmi language of Chad

Kaba So
- Kulfa
- Native to: Chad
- Native speakers: (7,100 cited 1993 census); 4,030 Koulfa, 2,200 Kurumi, 910 Bara (1993 census)
- Language family: Nilo-Saharan?: Central Sudanic; Bongo–Bagirmi; Kaba; Kaba So
- Dialects: Bara; Kulfa; Kurumi

Language codes
- ISO 639-3: kxj
- Glottolog: kulf1238
- ELP: Kulfa

Kaba So, also known as Kulfa after its primary dialect, is a Bongo–Bagirmi language of Chad. It is nearly intelligible with Kaba Na, which is used as a second language.
