= Burum language =

Huon language spoken in Papua New Guinea

Burum
- Mindik
- Native to: Papua New Guinea
- Region: Huon Peninsula, Morobe Province
- Native speakers: (9,000 cited 2000 census)
- Language family: Trans–New Guinea: Finisterre–Huon; Huon; Western Huon; Burum
- Dialects: Somba; Siawari

Language codes
- ISO 639-3: bmu
- Glottolog: buru1306

Burum (also known as Yaknge or Somba-Siawari after its two dialects and Mindik in the language itself) is a Papuan language spoken in Morobe Province, Papua New Guinea. Its closest related language is Borong (also known as Kosorong).

== Phonology ==
=== Consonants ===
Consonants
		Labial	Alveolar	Palatal	Velar	
		Labial	Alveolar	Palatal	plain	lab.
Plosive	unvoiced	p	t		k	kʷ
Plosive	voiced	b	d		g	gʷ
Affricate	unvoiced		ts			
Affricate	voiced		dz			
Nasal		m	n		ŋ	
Trill			r			
Fricative		f	s		ɣ	
Approximant			l	j		w

- /p, t, k/ are aspirated word initially and unreleased word finally. Between vowels, they are /w, r, h/.
- /kʷ/ and /gʷ/ are rarely [kp], [gb] in some dialects.
- /ɣ/ is [h] word initially.

=== Vowels ===
Monophthongs
	Front	Central	Back
Close	i		u
Mid	e	ə	o
Open			ɑ

Burum also has 14 diphthongs: /iɑ/, /iu/, /ei/, /eu/, /əi/, /əu/, /oi/, /oe/, /ou/, /ɑi/, /ɑu/, /ui/, /ue/, and /uɑ/.

== Orthography ==
Orthography
Uppercase letters	A	B	D	E	F	G	H	I	J	K	L	M	N	Ŋ	O	P	Q	R	S	T	U	W	Gw	Y	Z	Ö
Lowercase letters	a	b	d	e	f	g	h	i	j	k	l	m	n	ŋ	o	p	q	r	s	t	u	w	gw	y	z	ö
IPA	/ɑ/	/b/	/d/	/e/	/f/	/ɡ/	/ɣ/	/i/	/dz/	/k/	/l/	/m/	/n/	/ŋ/	/o/	/p/	/kʷ/	/r/	/s/	/t/	/u/	/w/	/gʷ/	/j/	/t͡s/	/ə/

- ⟨f⟩ occurs in loanwords.
- Weakened /p, t, k/ are written ⟨w, r, h⟩, as pronounced.
