= Kaba languages =

Kaba
- Sara Kaba
- Geographic distribution: CAR, Chad
- Linguistic classification: Nilo-Saharan?: Central Sudanic; Bongo–Bagirmi; Kaba
- Subdivisions: Kaba Deme; Kaba Na; Kulfa

Language codes
- ISO 639-3: –
- Glottolog: sara1348 (Sara-Kaba) kulf1238 (Kulfa)

The Kaba languages, also called Sara Kaba but not to be confused with the Sara languages, comprise three to five languages of Chad and the Central African Republic. They are Bongo–Bagirmi languages of the Central Sudanic language family.

The most populous Kaba languages are Kaba Deme and Kaba Naa (Kaba Na, Kaba Nar), spoken by about forty thousand people apiece. Others are Kaba proper (Ta Sara), Kaba/Sara Dunjo, and Kulfa (Kaba So, Kurmi). It is not clear that Naa, Dunjo, and Kaba proper (Ta Sara) are actually distinct languages. Kulfa speakers are ethnically distinct.

The terms "Kaba" and "Sara" are generic and often interchangeable, and do not correspond to the somewhat arbitrarily named Kaba and Sara branches of Central Sudanic. Kabba and Kabba Laka, for example, are Sara languages, and many of the Kaba languages go under the names "Kaba", "Sara", and "Kaba Sara".
