= Momare language =

Papuan language

Momare
- Native to: Papua New Guinea
- Region: Huon Peninsula
- Ethnicity: 800 (2020 census)
- Native speakers: (undated figure of 10) not in daily use
- Language family: Trans–New Guinea: Finisterre–Huon; Huon; Eastern Huon; Momare

Language codes
- ISO 639-3: msz
- Glottolog: moma1243
- ELP: Momare

Momare is a moribund Papuan language of Morobe Province, Papua New Guinea.
