= Sialum Rural LLG =

Local-level government in Papua New Guinea

- Location within Papua New Guinea
- Coordinates: 6.094271°S 147.603382°E
- Country: Papua New Guinea
- Province: Morobe Province
- Time zone: UTC+10 (AEST)

Sialum Rural LLG is a local-level government (LLG) of Morobe Province, Papua New Guinea.

== Wards ==
- 01. Gitua
- 02. Kumukio
- 03. Sialum (Sialum language speakers)
- 04. Gitukia
- 05. Kukuya
- 06. Kangkeu
- 07. Rua
- 08. Nungen (including the village of Nunzen)
- 09. Kanome
- 10. Ririwo
- 11. Karako
- 12. Zankoa
- 13. Wandokai
- 14. Walingai
- 15. Rebafu
- 16. Zange Fifi
- 17. Zuzumau
- 18. Masa
- 19. Kingarenau
- 20. Siwea
