= Tumtum language =

Kadu language of Sudan

Tumtum
- Native to: Sudan
- Region: South Kordofan
- Native speakers: 17,000 (2022)
- Language family: Nilo-Saharan?: Kadu; Kadugli–Krongo; Eastern; Tumtum
- Dialects: Karondi; Talassa; Tumtum

Language codes
- ISO 639-3: tbr
- Glottolog: tumt1243
- ELP: Tumtum
- Tumtum is classified as Severely Endangered by the UNESCO Atlas of the World's Languages in Danger.

Tumtum is a Nilo-Saharan language of the Kadu branch spoken in South Kordofan, Sudan. Dialects are Karondi (Kurondi, Korindi), Talassa, and Tumtum proper.
