= Timbe language =

Papuan language

Timbe
- Native to: Papua New Guinea
- Region: Huon Peninsula, Morobe Province
- Native speakers: (11,000 cited 1991)
- Language family: Trans–New Guinea: Finisterre–Huon; Huon; Western Huon; Timbe

Language codes
- ISO 639-3: tim
- Glottolog: timb1251

Timbe is a Papuan language spoken in Morobe Province, Papua New Guinea. Women and older men are monolingual.

== Phonology ==
=== Consonants ===
		Labial	Dental/ Alveolar	Palatal	Velar	Glottal
Plosive	voiceless	p	t̪		k	
Plosive	voiced	b	d̪		ɡ	
Plosive	prenasal	ᵐb	ⁿ̪d̪		ᵑɡ	
Nasal		m	n̪		ŋ	
Fricative			s			h
Lateral			l			
Approximant		w		j		

- /b, d̪, ɡ/ can be lenited as [β, ɾ~r, ɣ] in intervocalic positions.
- /t̪, d̪/ are heard as [tʃ, dʒ] when following /ŋ/.

=== Vowels ===
	Front	Back
High	i	u
Mid	e	o
Low	a	ɔ
