= Sialum language =

Papuan language of Papua New Guinea

Sialum
- Native to: Papua New Guinea
- Region: Huon Peninsula
- Ethnicity: 1,000 (2000)
- Native speakers: (400 cited 2000)
- Language family: Trans–New Guinea: Finisterre–Huon; Huon; Western Huon; Sialum

Language codes
- ISO 639-3: slw
- Glottolog: sial1240

Sialum is a Papuan language of Sialum Rural LLG (6.094271°S 147.603382°E), Morobe Province, Papua New Guinea.
