= Migabac language =

Papuan language of Papua New Guinea

Migabac
- Native to: Papua New Guinea
- Region: Huon Peninsula
- Native speakers: 2,600 (2010)
- Language family: Trans–New Guinea: Finisterre–Huon; Huon; Eastern Huon; Migabac

Language codes
- ISO 639-3: mpp
- Glottolog: miga1241

Migabac is a Papuan language spoken in Morobe Province, Papua New Guinea.

== Phonology ==
=== Vowels ===
	Front	Central	Back
Close	i		u
Mid	e		o
Open		a	

=== Consonants (orthographic) ===
	Labial	Alveolar	Palatal	Velar	Labiovelar	Labialized velar	Glottal
Voiceless plosive	p	t		k	kp	kw	-c
Voiced plosive	b	d		g	gb		
Nasal	m	n		ng			
Voiced affricate		dz					
Voiceless fricative	f	s					h
Lateral approximant		l					
Central approximant			y		w		
