= Hoava language =

Austronesian language spoken in the Solomon Islands

Hoava
- Native to: Solomon Islands
- Region: Marovo Lagoon (Nggerasi Lagoon), New Georgia Island
- Native speakers: (460 cited 1999)
- Language family: Austronesian: Malayo-Polynesian; Oceanic; Northwest Solomonic; New Georgia – Ysabel; New Georgia; Hoava
- Dialects: Hoava; Kusaghe; Njela

Language codes
- ISO 639-3: hoa – inclusive code Individual code: ksg – Kusaghe
- Glottolog: hoav1238
- ELP: Hoava
- Hoava is classified as Vulnerable by the UNESCO Atlas of the World's Languages in Danger.

Hoava is an Oceanic language spoken by 1000–1500 people on New Georgia Island, Solomon Islands. Speakers of Hoava are multilingual and usually also speak Roviana, Marovo, Solomon Islands Pijin, English.

== Dialects ==
Hoava has a distinct dialect, Kusaghe.

== History ==
Hoava is an Austronesian language that is spoken mostly on the island of New Georgia. New Georgia is a mountainous island, 85 kilometres long and 41 kilometres wide at its widest part, with a total area of 2,145 square kilometres (828 mi^{2}), covered with dense rainforests. The island was involved in a series of World War II battles, later named the New Georgia Campaign, which lasted from June 20 to November 3, 1943.

== Population ==
Hoava is spoken in three known locations: Western Province, New Georgia Island, and North Marovo lagoon, but mainly New Georgia Island. According to a 1986 census there are about 2,360 speakers of the language, but as of the 1999 census, the language is spoken by 460 people, suggesting a huge decline in the number of speakers.

== Endangerment ==
=== Materials ===
There are not many materials written in Hoava. The only material of outside world access is a guide to grammar by Karen Davis and a storybook, which is only beginning to fall out of use. There are translations of the Bible and stories but not much else is known about surviving materials.

=== Vitality ===
According to Ethnologue, Hoava has a 6b (Yellow) endangerment status. "Intergenerational transmission is in the process of being broken, but the childbearing generation can still use the language so it is possible that revitalization efforts could restore transmission of the language in the home". Without intergenerational transfer, main outlet uses will soon be destroyed or fade away while other languages take its place. With the decrease of L1 speakers, the value of the language in the community will only drop until it is no longer applicable to the community. Combined with the low number of speakers, if no action is to take place, Hoava will fade to away into disuse.

== Phonology ==
=== Consonants ===
Hoava uses 16 consonants in its phoneme system, /p, t, b, d, s, β, m, n, r, l, dʒ, k, g, ɣ, ŋ, h/.

		Bilabial	(Post) alv	Velar	Glottal
Plosive	voiceless	p	t	k	
Plosive	voiced	b	d	g	
Nasal		m	n	ŋ	
Fricative		β	s	ɣ	h
Affricate			ʤ		
Approximant			l		
Trill			r		

=== Vowels ===
Hoava uses five vowels: /i, ɛ, a, ɔ, u/. There is no phonemic distinction of vowel length, although vowels can be lengthened when stressed. The vowels can be combined into pairs with the weight of two syllables.

	Front	Back
High	i	u
Mid	ɛ	ɔ
Low	a	

=== Syllable structure ===
Hoava has an open syllable structure of (C)V. Two vowels occurring together are counted as two syllables, since they function as such for transitive marking rules. For many Oceanic languages of the Austronesian family group it is common that words do not end in consonants.

== Morphology ==
=== Reduplication ===
Reduplication is frequently used in Hoava as a method of word formation, to express intensification, and to form the progressive aspect of a verb. Reduplication is used to create words denoting entities related to the referent of the source word, either as part of the entity, or having a resemblance to it, or being a metaphorical extension".

- bui 'lost'; bu-bui 'forgot'
- yasa 'jump'; yasa-yasa 'jumping'

=== Pronouns ===
==== Personal pronouns ====
Information in the following sections is based on Karen Davis's 2003 Grammar.

In Hoava there exist three sets of characteristics in order to distinguish which personal pronoun is to be used. This includes whether the pronoun is first, second or third person; the plurality needed; whether it is singular or plural and whether it is inclusive or exclusive.

Personal pronouns
		Singular	Plural
1st person	exclusive	rao	gami
1st person	inclusive	rao	gita
2nd person		goe	gamu
3rd person		i(sa)	ria

There are a number of extra circumstances and exceptions which are also present when discussing the use of personal pronouns. One specific example of this is the third-person singular form isa, which is used as an emphatic (forcible) form or used to refer to a particular topic. Speakers of Hoava tend to use sa for a more general pronoun.

The third-person pronoun eri is used with a dual form created by using the number 'two' karu after a plural pronoun. A trial form is also created by using the number 'three' prefix ka-hike. The dual forms are obligatory whereas trial forms can be replaced by a simple plural.

Forms specific for four people are common when it is significant to know that four people were involved. The number 'four' follows the pronoun with the number prefix added, e.g. gita ka-made, gami ka-made. Other numbers can be substituted into a sentence in the same matter. When these dual or numerical forms are used, it is most commonly at the start of a narrative to add the names of the others in the group. This does not include the speaker themselves. These pronoun forms can come before a noun phrase in apposition.

Sagele pule mae eri karu.
go.up return come PRO:3PL two
'They (two) came back up.'

Some other characteristics to note with the use of pronouns in Hoava are that pronouns can be followed by demonstratives and by the restrictive particle qa; an example of this can be seen below.

There exist some cases in Hoava in which it is not completely necessary for a pronoun to be present or where exceptions to the use of pronouns exist. Firstly, it is common for the pronoun to be dropped from a sentence completely once it has been made clear who is being referred to, or if it is clear who is being referred to by other information such as object markers. Also, the dropping of pronouns referring to animate objects is predominantly done with first-person singular and plural and second-person plural pronouns in object position, as the object marker on the verb is the same as the pronoun.

Inanimate objects in Hoava do not often have a pronominal reference, a construction which resembles a pronoun to identify the object. However, it is possible to use a pronoun for an inanimate object even though it is rare.

In Hoava there exist no reflexive forms of the pronouns. In order to create the same meaning as a reflexive, the verb pule (meaning 'return') is used. "There is no subject or object pronoun used, other than the object marker on the applicative suffix...in any of the sentences elicited with the pule used in this manner."

Vaquru teqe pule-ni-rao qa.
new cut return-AP-1SG REST
'I've just cut myself.'

As seen in the example above, pule has been used with the applicable suffix and the singular exclusive first-person pronoun rao to create the meaning of the reflexive form 'I've'. Also, the pronoun is followed by the restrictive particle qa, which is a characteristic that was mentioned earlier to sometimes occur with the use of pronouns.

The morpheme tale- can also be used in the instances mentioned above, but rather than performing a reflexive function, it acts as an emphasis that no other people were involved apart from the speaker.

Vaquru teqe pule-ni-a tale-na.
new cut return-AP-3SG alone-3SG
'(She) has just cut herself.'

Within the lexicon of Hoava there are some verbs which have an inherent reflexive meaning built in and therefore the use of an extra form which suggests that it is reflexive is not needed. These are verbs which automatically mean performing an action to oneself, such as hele 'wash oneself' or viraka 'scratch (oneself)'.

==== Demonstrative pronouns ====
In Hoava there exists a three-way spatial differentiation of deixis. This includes proximal, close to the speaker; distal, close to the hearer; and remote, distant for the speaker and the hearer. Of the three sets of demonstratives in Hoava, two sets concern the use of pronouns: a set of long forms that are used as both noun modifiers and as demonstrative pronouns and another set which is restricted to being used only as demonstrative pronouns. An extra set of 'near to hearer' long demonstratives is also used both as a noun modifier and demonstrative pronoun. These sets all have both singular and plural forms which can be used.

Long demonstratives
	Singular	Plural
proximal (close to speaker)	heni	heri
distal (close to hearer)	sani	sari
remote (distant)	hunai	huari

These long demonstratives can act as demonstrative pronouns at the beginning of a noun phrase.

An example of the use of long demonstratives is as follows:

Heri ria nikana vihe.
PROX:PL ART:PL man choose
'These are the chosen men.'

It is more common in Hoava for the morphemes isana and tiara to be used in place as demonstrative pronouns in favour of the singular distal demonstratives sani and the plural sari. It is also not common for the remote demonstratives Huani and Huari to be used.

Hoava has a set of short demonstratives, which are a group of particles found after the noun head of a noun phrase. They have the noun-modifying function of adding a sense of definiteness and they may also signify tense. They can be used with common nouns, names, and pronouns.

Short demonstratives
	Singular	Plural
Close	ni	ri
Distant	na	ra
Remote/past	so	ro

For example, a short demonstrative follows a personal pronoun:

Kolo, na sa taveti-a gamu na?
friend ART what do.TR-3SG PRO:2PL DEM
'Friend, what are you doing?'

The long demonstratives mentioned above cannot occur after the emphatic particles ba and ga as another set of emphatic demonstrative pronouns exist for that case. This other set is used also in questions or as an alternative to the long forms.

Emphatic demonstratives
		Singular	Plural
Visible	Near speaker	pi	piri
Visible	Near hearer	sana	sara
Visible	Distant	pu	puru
Not visible		si	siri

Na sa heni? {} Na binu ba sana.
ART what PRO:SG {} ART lime EMPH DIST:SG
'What is this?' 'That's lime!'

==== Possessive pronouns ====
Hoava has a set of possessive pronouns which are used at the head of a noun phrase before the item which is being possessed. They are used in cases of exclusive possession.

Possessive pronouns
		Singular	Plural
1st person	exclusive	qua	mami
1st person	inclusive	qua	nada
2nd person		mua	mi
3rd person		nana	dia

Mami gugusu
POSS:1PL.EX village
'our village'

Na dia sanu koe-di
ART POSS:3PL thing old-3PL
'Their old things'

=== Person marking ===
Hoava has two optional articles, E and se, which may or may not be used with personal names or personified animals and birds. These articles are used before the name and although Se is more likely to be used over E, neither example is completely necessary and can be dropped.

{Samu Gobe} misianare tami gami
{Samu Gobe} teacher POSS:1PL.EX PRO:1PL.EX
'Our teacher was Samu Gobe.'

== Negation ==
Hoava has four types of sentential negation; kipu, kae, kahi and maki. All of these negative particles are placed before the predicate.

=== The negator kipu ===
The negator kipu expresses factual negation, whereby the speaker claims that what they are saying is correct. As shown below, kipu can be used in past and present events. These are asserted to be factual.

Kipu gilalí rao vivine-di ria ra.
NEG know.TR:3PL PRO:1SG story-3PL PRO:3PL DEM
'I don't know the stories of them.'

Saonae kipu pule sa loa-na.
long.time NEG return ART.SG spouse-3SG
'Her husband did not return for a long time.'

Kipu isa qa sa pakupaku.
NEG PRO:3SG REST ART:SG necklace
'It's not the necklace.'

However, kipu can also be used to indicate future events that are expected to be true. Note that kipu can both precede and follow the future particle.

Pula ve, koni kipu ta-va-mate.
if like FUT NEG PASS-CAUS-be.dead
'If so, (he) will not be killed.'

Kipu koni tavetí ria ba sara.
NEG FUT make.TR:3PL PRO:3PL EMPH those
'They will not make those.'

Below, kipu is placed after the definite article of a nominal predicate:

Se Matakale sagi na kipu tu-na sa nikana so.
ART M. TOP ART NEG child-3SG ART:SG man PAST:SG
'Matakale, he was not a son of man.'

In cases where a noun phrase is placed before the verb phrase or noun phrase predicate, kipu is not fronted.

Ria pa Vareso, ria kipu ṉaní sa.
PRO:3PL PRP V. PRO:3PL NEG eat.TR:3PL PRO:3SG
'Those from Vareso, them he did not eat.'

Na koburu isana kipu tiqu-a hinaquru.
ART child that NEG tough-TR:3SG girl
'That child, girls didn't touch him.'

Kipu can also be found within imperative clauses:

Veko-a, kipu ilisoqo-a.
leave-TR:3SG NEG hurt-TR:3SG
'Leave him, don't hurt him.'

=== The negator kae ===
The negator kae is occasionally shortened in Kusaghe to ke. It is used to emphasise events and states that are not possible, not allowed or which run counter to the usual state of affairs.

Kae is used to mark events and states that are not possible due to some factor which prevents their occurrence.

Isa sa pu kae dugili-ni-a Pilipi.
PRO-3SG PRO:3SG REL NEG be.deaf-AP-3SG Pilipi
'That's what stops Pilipi from being deaf.'

Prohibitions can also use kae. Similar to kipu which can be used with imperatives, kae can also be used to display everyday imperatives which are generally used towards children.

Kae kabo.
NEG cry
'Don't cry.'

Kae do=dola la-ia ṉina goe se Maqiqo na.
NEG REDUP=stare go-TR:3SG possibly PRO:2SG ART Mangginggo DEM
'Don't you go staring at that Mangginggo.'

Another use of kae is when an event of state is not the expected one, such as an event that was expected to happen but did not.

Kae atu velu ba rao so.
NEG go.to.you yesterday EMPH PRO:1SG PAST:SG
'I did not come to you yesterday.'

Kae can also be used for hypothetical events that are not generally expected to occur.

Pula vena kae ta-poka labete, doluru kasitoṉa heri, koni uke qa sa kabasa.
if SIM NEG PASS-be.nailed board all thing these FUT fall REST ART:SG house
'If boards, all these things, are not nailed, the house will fall.'

Contradictory statements is often expressed using the phrase kae gua, which means 'not so, not as stated'.

“Vegoa, solodia goe ni?” gua isa. “Kari, solodia kae gua.”
how soldier PRO:2SG DEM said PRO:3SG no soldier NEG said
'“What, are you a soldier?” he said. “No, (I'm) not a soldier.”'

=== The negator kahi ===
Kahi which means 'not yet' is a negator used to express the likelihood that an event or state will occur, despite not having taken place yet at the point in time referred to. Kahi, like the other negative particles, can be seen to precede the verb phrase.

Kipu hana ṉani pu kahi varavara, mi varavara paki tu tiqe ṉani qa.
NEG anyhow bite COND not.yet pray but pray first REST then bite REST
'(You) don't eat if have not yet prayed, but pray first and then eat.'

=== The modal negator maki ===
Maki is a modal negative particle which expresses the desire of the speaker that negative consequences of an event do not occur. It is placed immediately before the verb phrase.

Maki ta-ṉani leboto.
NEG:WARN PASS-bite machete
'Don't be hurt by the machete.'

Maki uke goe.
NEG:WARN fall PRO:2SG
'Don't you fall.'

== Syntax ==
=== Basic word order ===
In traditional typology Hoava is a verb–subject–object (VSO) language. There are some modifications to this particular pattern for focusing and topicalization purposes.

== Vocabulary ==
=== Indigenous vocabulary ===
- hore 'canoe'
- leboto 'bushknife'
- igana 'fish'
- inebara 'feast'
- pirae 'now'
- tavete 'make'
- keke 'one'
- mae 'come'
- toka 'follow'
- puta 'sleep'
- gua 'did'
- heleana 'river'
- ko 'be'
- tala 'where'
- la 'go'
- koburu 'child'
- ome 'see'

=== Numerals ===
Hoava has a decimal system of numbering.

1. keke 'one'
2. karua 'two'
3. hike 'three'
4. made 'four'
5. lima 'five'
6. onomo 'six'
7. zuapa 'seven'
8. vesu 'eight'
9. sia 'nine'
10. manege 'ten'

== Sources ==
- Davis, Karen (2003). A Grammar of the Hoava language, Western Solomons. Pacific Linguistics 535. Canberra: Pacific Linguistics. doi:10.15144/PL-535. hdl:1885/146158. ISBN 978-0-85883-502-3.
