= Dedua language =

Language spoken in Morobe Province, Papua New Guinea

Dedua
- Native to: Papua New Guinea
- Region: Huon Peninsula, Morobe Province
- Ethnicity: 8,900 (2000 census?)
- Native speakers: (6,500 cited 2000 census)
- Language family: Trans–New Guinea: Finisterre–Huon; Huon; Eastern Huon; Dedua

Language codes
- ISO 639-3: ded
- Glottolog: dedu1240

Dedua is a Papuan language spoken in Morobe Province, Papua New Guinea. Dialects are Dzeigoc and Fanic.

== Phonology ==
The plain linked text shows IPA, while the text in angle brackets shows the orthography. If no angle brackets are shown, the orthography is the same as the IPA.

=== Vowels ===
	Front	Back
Close	i	u
Mid	e	o
Open		a

=== Consonants ===
		Labial	Alveolar	Palatal	Velar	Labial–velar	Glottal
Plosive	voiceless	p	t		k	k͡p ⟨kp⟩	ʔ ⟨h/c⟩
Plosive	voiced	b	d		g	ɡ͡b ⟨gb⟩	
Nasal		m	n		ŋ ⟨ng⟩		
Fricative		f	s				
Affricate				dʑ ⟨dz⟩			
Trill			r				
Approximant				j ⟨y⟩		w	
