= Kaba language =

Bongo–Bagirmi language of Chad and the CAR

Kaba
- Sara Kaba
- Native to: Central African Republic, Chad
- Native speakers: (53,000 cited 1993–1996)
- Language family: Nilo-Saharan?: Central Sudanic; Bongo–Bagirmi; Kaba; Kaba
- Dialects: Dunje (Dendje), Mbanga (Banga), Na (Náà), Tie (Tiye)

Language codes
- ISO 639-3: Variously: kwv – Kaba Náà sbz – Sara Kaba (Ta Sara) ksp – Kaba
- Glottolog: sara1348 adds Deme

Kaba proper is a Bongo–Bagirmi language of Chad and the Central African Republic. It is one of several local languages that go by the names Kaba and Sara. There are three ISO codes, which Ethnologue acknowledges may be the same thing.

== Phonology ==
Consonants
	Labial	Alveolar	Palatal	Velar	Glottal
Plosive	p b	t d	(tʃ) dʒ	k g	
Implosive	ɓ	ɗ			
Prenasalized	ᵐb	ⁿd	ⁿdʒ	ᵑg	
Fricative		s			h
Nasal	m	n	ɲ	ŋ	
Approximant	w	l	j		

- /k/ can often be heard as a uvular plosive [q].
- /k/ can also often be pronounced as a fricative /x/ by some speakers.
- /ɗ/ is often interchangeable with [r], but is pronounced [ɗ] in careful speech, except word-finally, where it is pronounced [r].
- /tʃ/ is only found in one word.

Vowels
	Front	Central	Back
High	i iː		u uː
Mid-high	e eː		o oː
Mid-low	ɛ ɛː		ɔ ɔː
Low		a aː	

- Vowel length is often not regarded to be phonemic, but it is a contrastive feature in the verbal morphology.

Kaba has three tones: high, low, and mid.

== See also ==
- Kabba language
- Kaba languages
- Sara languages
