= Tumma people =

Sudanese ethnic group

Tumma, also known as Sangali, is an ethnic group in South Kordofan in Sudan. They speak Katcha-Kadugli-Miri, a Nilo-Saharan language. They live south of the Nuba Hills.
