= Kanga language =

Kadu language of Kordofan, Sudan

Kanga
- Native to: Sudan
- Region: South Kordofan
- Ethnicity: Kanga
- Native speakers: 17,000 (2022)
- Language family: Nilo-Saharan: Kadu; Kadugli–Krongo; Western; Kanga
- Writing system: Latin

Language codes
- ISO 639-3: kcp
- Glottolog: kang1288
- ELP: Kanga
- Kanga is classified as Severely Endangered by the UNESCO Atlas of the World's Languages in Danger.

Kanga is a Nilo-Saharan language of the Kadu branch spoken in South Kordofan, Sudan.

The Kufa-Lima dialect is spoken in Bilenya, Dologi, Lenyaguyox, Lima, Kilag, Kufa, Mashaish, and Toole villages, with Toole as the central village.

A preliminary grammar of the Kufa-Lima variety (termed "Kufo") has been published recently.

A phonological description of the Kufa-Lima variety (termed "Kufo") has been developed, and the vowel inventory has been investigated with acoustic phonetic evidence.
