= Kâte language =

Papuan language

Kâte
- Pronunciation: [kɔtɛ]
- Native to: Papua New Guinea
- Region: Huon Peninsula, Morobe Province
- Native speakers: 20,000 (2011)
- Language family: Trans–New Guinea: Finisterre–Huon; Huon; Eastern Huon; Kâte
- Writing system: Latin

Language codes
- ISO 639-3: kmg
- Glottolog: kate1253

Kâte is a Papuan language spoken by about 6,000 people in the Finschhafen District of Morobe Province, Papua New Guinea. It is part of the Finisterre–Huon branch of the Trans–New Guinea language family (McElhanon 1975, Ross 2005). It was adopted for teaching and mission work among speakers of Papuan languages by the Evangelical Lutheran Church of Papua New Guinea in the early 1900s and at one time had as many as 80,000 second-language speakers.

== Dialects ==
The name Kâte means 'forest', an epithet for the inlanders on the tip of the Huon peninsula, excepting the people living along the Mape River (Flierl and Strauss 1977). The coastal people to the south, mostly speaking Jabêm, are called Hâwec 'sea' and those to the north, speaking Momare and Migabac, are called Sopâc 'grass'. These were geographical rather than language names. The indigenous glossonyms referred to smaller linguistics units that can be called dialects. McElhanon (1974: 16) identifies five dialects at the time of earliest mission contact in 1886, each named according to how they pronounce a common word or phrase.

- Wana ('where?'), the southernmost dialect
- Wamorâ ('why?')
- Mâgobineng ('they are saying it') or Bamotâ ('why?'), nearly extinct in 1974
- Parec, already extinct by 1974
- Wemo ('what?') or Wena, adopted as the mission lingua franca

Wana and Wemo are nearly identical, but they differ considerably from Mâgobineng and Wamorâ, to such an extent that these might be considered to be three closely related languages. Parec was probably a transitional dialect between Wemo and Wamorâ. The Kâte dialects formed a chain with the neighboring Mape dialects. All dialects of the chain are being supplanted by Wemo (Suter 2014: 19).

== Phonology ==
=== Vowels ===
Kâte distinguishes six vowels. The low back vowel â (representing /ɔ/) sounds like the vowel of UK English law or saw (Pilhofer 1933: 14). Length is not distinctive.

	Front	Central	Back
High	i		u
Mid	e		o
Low		a	ɔ

- /e/ is heard as [ɛ] when before sounds /t͡s ɾ ʔ/ as well as nasal consonants.
- /ɔ/ can also be heard in sporadic variation as [ɒ].

=== Consonants ===
The glottal stop, written -c, only occurs after a vowel and Pilhofer first describes it as a vowel feature that distinguishes, for instance, bo 'sugarcane' from boc 'very' and si 'planting' from sic 'broth'. However, McElhanon (1974) notes that final glottal stop is barely phonemic in the Wemo dialect, but corresponds to a wider variety of syllable-final consonants in Western Huon languages (-p, -t, -k, -m, -n, -ŋ), which are neutralized (to -c, -ŋ) in the Eastern Huon languages, including Kâte. Pilhofer (1933) writes the lateral flap with an l, but Schneuker (1962) and Flierl and Strauss (1977) write it with an r.

The fricatives f and w are both labiodentals, according to Pilhofer (1933), but bilabials, according to Flierl and Strauss (1977). Alveopalatal z and ʒ are affricates, [ts] and [dz] respectively, but they otherwise pattern like the stops, except that z only occurs between vowels, while ʒ occurs morpheme-initially (Flierl and Strauss 1977: xv). Both Pilhofer (1933: 15) and Flierl and Strauss (1977) describe the labiovelars q and ɋ as coarticulated and simultaneously released [kp] and [gb], respectively. (The letter ɋ is a curly q with hooked tail that cannot properly be rendered if it is missing from system fonts.)

		Labial	Dental	Alveolar	Dorsal	Labiovelar	Glottal
Nasal		m	n		ŋ		
Stop	voiceless	p	t	t͡s	k	k͡p	ʔ
Stop	voiced	b	d	d͡z	g	ɡ͡b	
Stop	prenasal	ᵐb	ⁿd	ⁿd͡z	ᵑɡ	ᵑɡ͡b	
Fricative	voiceless	f		s			h
Fricative	voiced	w					
Approximant		w			j		
Liquid				ɾ			

- /d/ in word-medial position is heard as a flapped [d̆].
- /f/ before vowels /i, e/ is heard as a bilabial [ɸ].
- /j/ can also be heard as a fricative [ç] when before front vowels.
- /ɾ/ can be heard as a voiced lateral [ɺ] when before front vowels.
- /w/ can be heard as a fricative [β] when before vowels /u, o, ɔ/.

== Morphology ==
=== Pronouns ===
==== Free pronouns ====
Unlike pronouns in most Papuan languages, Kâte free pronouns distinguish inclusive and exclusive in the 1st person, presumably due to Austronesian influence. However, this distinction is not maintained in pronominal affixes. The table of free pronouns is from Pilhofer (1933: 51-52). Personal pronouns are only used to refer to animate beings. Demonstratives are used to refer to inanimates.

Like nouns, free pronouns can occur in subject or object positions in clauses, although the longer form of the singular pronouns (noni, goki, eki) can only occur in subject position (Schneuker 1962: 28). Like nouns, free pronouns can also occur with directional affixes and case-marking postpositions, as in no-raonec 'from me'. go-raopec 'toward you', nâhe-hec 'with him and me', jaŋe tâmiric 'without them'. The forms in parentheses ending in -c are "emphatic pronouns" and can be added to regular pronouns, as in go gahac 'you yourself' or jahe jahac 'they themselves'.

The free pronouns can also be appended to nouns to indicate

1. number, as in ŋic jaŋe (man 3pl) 'the men' and qaqazu nâŋe (teacher 1pl) 'we teachers';
2. definiteness, as in ŋokac e (woman 3sg) 'the woman';
3. person, as in qaqazu-ge no (teacher-2sg 1sg) 'me your teacher'.

A free pronoun coreferent with the head noun frequently marks the end of a relative clause and the resumption of the matrix sentence, as in:

ŋic monda-o ware-wec e ʒira mi fo-wec
man Monday-on come-3SG.FPST 3SG here not sleep-3SG.FPST
'the man who came on Monday did not stay here'. (Schneuker 1962: 31-32)

Free pronouns
		Singular	Dual	Plural
1st person	exclusive	no(ni) (nahac)	nâhe (nâhâc)	nâŋe (nâŋâc)
1st person	inclusive		nâhâc	nâŋâc
2nd person		go(ki) (gahac)	ŋohe (ŋahac)	ŋoŋe (ŋaŋac)
3rd person		e(ki) (jahac)	jahe (jahac)	jaŋe (jaŋac)

==== Genitive pronouns ====
Kâte has two types pronominal genitives: possessive suffixes on nouns, and preposed free pronouns suffixed with -re after final vowels or -ne after forms ending in -c (glottal stop) (Pilhofer 1933: 54-57; Schneuker 1962: 27-32). The latter suffix resembles the invariable -ne that turns nouns into adjectives, as in opâ 'water' > opâ-ne 'watery', hulili 'rainbow' > hulili-ne 'rainbow-colored', hâmoc 'death' > hâmoc-ne 'dead', or fiuc 'theft' > fiuc-ne 'thievish' (Pilhofer 1933: 49). Examples of preposed possessive pronouns include no-re fic 'my house'; no nahac-ne fic 'my very own house'; e-re hâmu 'his/her coconut palm'; jaŋe-re wiak 'their concern/matter' (Schneuker 1962: 28).

Possessive suffixes
	Singular	Dual	Plural
1st person	-nane	-nâhec	-nâŋec
2nd person	-ge	-ŋekic	-ŋeŋic
3rd person	-ticne/-ne	-jekic	-jeŋic

==== Direct object suffixes ====
Direct object (accusative) suffixes come between verb stems and the subject-marking suffixes. Simple vowel-final verb stems are obligatorily affixed with -c before accusative suffixes, except when the 3rd person singular object suffix is zero. Compare mamac-zi hone-c-gu-wec 'father saw me' vs. mamac-zi hone-wec 'father saw him/her'. (Pilhofer 1933: 38-43; Schneuker 1962: 29-30)

Accusative suffixes
	Singular	Dual	Plural
1st person	-(c)nu-	-(c)nâfo-	-(c)nâpo-
2nd person	-(c)gu-	-(c)ŋofa-	-(c)ŋopa-
3rd person	-	-(c)jofa-	-(c)jopa-

Naru e ŋokac jajahec bafi-c-jofa-wec.
girl 3SG woman two help-c-3DU.ACC-3SG.FPST
'The girl helped two women.' (Schneuker 1962: 30)

==== Indirect object suffixes ====
Indirect object (dative) suffixes come between dative verb stems and the subject-marking suffixes (Pilhofer 1933: 40-43; Schneuker 1962: 30),

Dative suffixes
	Singular	Dual	Plural
1st person	-nare-	-nâcte-	-nâre-
2nd person	-gare-	-ŋacte-	-ŋare-
3rd person	-cne-	-jacte-	-jare-

Neŋgoc-ge-zi nânâ ba-ware-gare-wec me?
mother-2SG-ERG food hold-come-2SG.DAT-3SG.FPST Q
Did your mother bring you some food?' (Schneuker 1962: 31)

=== Verb morphology ===
==== Final (independent) verbs ====
Each finite independent verb is suffixed to show tense and the grammatical person of the subject. There are five tense forms: present, near past, far past, near future, and far future. Animate subjects are marked for three persons (1st, 2nd, 3rd) and three numbers (singular, dual, plural), although the same suffixes are used for both 2nd and 3rd person dual and plural. Inanimate subjects are only marked as 3rd person singular. Durative aspect can be conveyed by adding -e- before the present tense marker or -ju- before the near past tense marker. Two hortative moods can be signaled by subtracting final -mu from the near future tense suffix (to elicit more immediate responses) or substituting a different but similar set of final subject markers (to elicit responses over longer-terms). (Pilhofer 1933: 26-32)

Present tense (± durative -e-)
	Singular	Dual	Plural
1st person	-(e)kopac	-(e)koperec	-(e)ŋgopeneŋ
2nd person	-(e)komec/-kic	-(e)kopirec	-(e)ŋgopieŋ
3rd person	-(e)kac	-(e)kopirec	-(e)ŋgopieŋ

Near past tense (± durative -ju-)
	Singular	Dual	Plural
1st person	-(ju)pac	-(ju)perec	-(ju)mbeneŋ
2nd person	-(ju)mec	-(ju)pirec	-(ju)mbieŋ
3rd person	-(ju)jec	-(ju)pirec	-(ju)mbieŋ

Far past tense
	Singular	Dual	Plural
1st person	-po	-pec	-mbeŋ
2nd person	-meŋ	-pic	-mbiŋ
3rd person	-wec	-pic	-mbiŋ

Near future tense (> hortative without -mu)
	Singular	Dual	Plural
1st person	-pe-mu	-nac-mu	-naŋ-mu
2nd person	-c-mu	-nic-mu	-niŋ-mu
3rd person	-oc-mu	-nic-mu	-niŋ-mu

Far future tense (rarely used)
	Singular	Dual	Plural
1st person	-zo-kopac	-zo-koperec	-nʒo-ŋgopeneŋ
2nd person	-zo-komec/-zo-kic	-zo-kopirec	-nʒo-ŋgopieŋ
3rd person	-zo-kac	-zo-kopirec	-nʒo-ŋgopieŋ

Far future hortative
	Singular	Dual	Plural
1st person	-ze-pac	-ze-perec	-nʒe-peneŋ
2nd person	-ze-mec	-ze-pirec	-nʒe-pieŋ
3rd person	-ze-jec	-ze-pirec	-nʒe-pieŋ

==== Medial (dependent) verbs ====
Kâte displays canonical switch-reference (SR) verb morphology. Coordinate-dependent (clause-medial) verbs are not marked for tense (or mood), but only for whether their actions are sequential, simultaneous, or durative in relation to the next verb in the SR clause chain. If the subject is the same (SS) as that of the next verb, its person and number is not marked. Verbs are suffixed for person and number only when their subject changes (DS). One dependent verb may be marked for both Durative and Simultaneous if its duration is extended enough to overlap with the beginning of the event described by the next clause. (Pilhofer 1933: 35-36) The examples come from Schneuker (1962).

Same-subject (SS) suffixes
Sequential (SEQ)	-râ
Simultaneous (SIM)	-huc
Durative (DUR)	-ku

Hata-o ra-huc homa moc hone-po.
road-on go-SIM.SS snake one see-1SG.FPST
'Going along the road I saw a snake.' (1962: 98)

Sequential subject-change (SEQ.DS)
	Singular	Dual	Plural
1st person	-pe	-pere	-pene
2nd person	-te	-pire	-pie
3rd person	-me	-pire	-pie

Hoe he-me gie behe-mbeneŋ.
rain hit-SEQ.3SG work abandon-1PL.PST
'We quit work when it rained.' (1962: 115)

Simultaneous subject-change (SIM.DS)
	Singular	Dual	Plural
1st person	-ha-pe	-ha-pere	-ha-pene
2nd person	-ha(ŋ)-tec	-ha-pire	-ha-pie
3rd person	-ha-me	-ha-pire	-ha-pie

Go gie-o ju-haŋ-tec neŋgoc-ge-zi ware-jec.
2SG work-at stay-SIM-2SG mother-2SG-ERG come-3SG.PST
'Your mother came while you were at work.' (1962: 105)

Durative subject-change (DUR.DS)
	Singular	Dual	Plural
1st person	-ku-pe	-ku-pere	-ku-pene
2nd person	-ku-te	-ku-pire	-ku-pie
3rd person	-ku-me	-ku-pire	-ku-pie

Hoe he-ku-me hata sâqore-wec.
rain hit-DUR-3SG road go.bad-3SG.FPST
'It rained a long time and the road became a mess.' (1962: 123)

Durative/Simultaneous subject-change (DUR.SIM.DS)
	Singular	Dual	Plural
1st person	-ku-ha-pe	-ku-ha-pere	-ku-ha-pene
2nd person	-ku-ha-te	-ku-ha-pire	-ku-ha-pie
3rd person	-ku-ha-me	-ku-ha-pire	-ku-ha-pie

Woŋec ŋe-ku-ha-pe fisi-mbiŋ.
wait dwell-DUR-SIM-1SG arrive-3SG.FPST
'After I had been waiting a long time, he appeared.' (1933: 36)

==== Other verbal affixes ====
===== Adverbial affixes =====
A small class of adverbial intensifying affixes can be added before final inflectional suffixes (Pilhofer 1933: 81-82). Examples include -fâre- 'all, together'; -jâmbâŋke- 'truly'; -hâmo- 'well, thoroughly'; saricke- 'well, skillfully'; sanaŋke- 'firmly, permanently'; -(b)ipie- 'futilely, in vain'. Sentence examples from Schneuker (1962: 154-158) follow.

No motec jaza-fâre-pac
1SG boy tell-all-1SG.PST
'I told all the boys.'

Motec jaŋe mamasiri e-jâmbâŋke-mbiŋ
boy 3PL play do-truly-3PL.FPST
'The boys really played.'

Nânâ mi ʒâ-hâmo-kac
food not cook-thoroughly-3SG.PRES
'The food isn't cooked thoroughly.'

Fic kecʒi-zi ŋe-sanaŋke-ocmu
house this-ERG last-permanently-3SG.FUT
'This house will last forever.'

Soŋaŋ-zi dâŋ mu-ipie-wec
elder-ERG word speak-in.vain-3SG.FPST
'The elder spoke in vain.'

== Evolution ==
Below are some Kâte (Wemo dialect) reflexes of proto-Trans-New Guinea proposed by Pawley (2012):

proto-Trans-New Guinea	Kâte (Wemo dialect)
*ma- ‘NEG clitic’	mi
*masi ‘orphan’	mɔsiŋ
*me(l,n)e ‘tongue’	(na)meŋ
*mundun ‘internal organs’	munduŋ ‘egg’
*mV(k,ŋ)V[C] + t(e,i)- ‘vomit’	maŋuzo
*(m,mb)elak ‘light, lightning’	bɔriʔ ‘glitter, flash of lightning, etc.’
*amu ‘breast’	ameʔ
*[nd,s]umu[n,t]V ‘hair’	tsiminuŋ ‘stiff coarse hair’
*kumV- ‘die’	hɔmozo
*(n)iman ‘louse’	imeŋ
*na ‘1SG’	no
*na- ‘eat’	nɔ-
*ni ‘1PL’	ne(n) ‘1PL’, ne(t) ‘2DU’
*kan(a,e)ne ‘left (side)’	(?) kpana
*mundun ‘internal organs’	munduŋ ‘egg’
*mbalaŋ ‘flame’	bɔruŋ
*mb(i,u)t(i,u)C ‘fingernail’	butoŋ
*mbeŋga(-masi) ‘orphan’	bekɔ ‘widow and child’
*sambV ‘cloud’	sambɔŋ ‘sky’
*mbena ‘arm’	me
*(mb,p)ututu- ‘to fly’	(?) fururuʔ
*si(mb,p)at[V] ‘saliva’	tofeʔ
*tVk- ‘cut, cut off’	tɔʔ(ne)
*(nd,t)a- ‘take’	lomedial
*mundun ‘internal organs’	munduŋ ‘inner yolk of egg’
*(ŋg,k)atata ‘dry’	(?) kereŋke
*sambV ‘cloud’	sambɔŋ ‘sky’
*masi ‘widow’	masiŋ
*si(mb,p)at[V] ‘saliva’	(?) tofeʔ
*ŋga ‘2SG’	go
*mbeŋga(-masi) ‘orphan’	bekɔ ‘widow and child’
*kumV- ‘die’	hɔmo
*ka(m,mb)(a,u)na ‘stone’	(?) kpana
*kV(mb,p)(i,u)t(i,u) ‘head’	(?) kpit(seʔ)
*(m,mb)elak ‘light, lightning’	bɔriʔ ‘glitter, flash of lightning, etc.’
