= Kovai language =

Language

Kovai
- Native to: Papua New Guinea
- Region: Umboi Island, Morobe Province
- Native speakers: 6,000 (2011)
- Language family: Trans–New Guinea: Finisterre–Huon; Huon; Kovai

Language codes
- ISO 639-3: kqb
- Glottolog: kova1243

Kovai (Kobai, Kowai) is a Papuan language spoken on Umboi Island, halfway between mainland Papua New Guinea and the island of New Britain, and mostly within the caldera of that volcanic island.

== Phonology ==
=== Vowels ===
	Front	Central	Back
Close	i		u
Mid	e		o
Open		a	

- Vowels may be heard as lax [ɪ ɛ ʌ ɔ ʊ] when in closed syllables.

=== Consonants ===
		Labial	Alveolar	Palatal	Velar
Plosive	voiceless	p	t		k
Plosive	voiced	b			ɡ
Nasal		m	n		ŋ
Fricative	voiceless		s		
Fricative	voiced		z		
Trill			r		
Approximant		w	l	j	

- In word-final position /b ɡ/ can be heard as devoiced [b̥ ɡ̊], and may also be realized as fricatives [β ɣ] in intervocalic positions.
