= Kusaghe dialect =

Dialect of Hoava

Kusaghe
- Native to: Solomon Islands
- Region: north New Georgia Island
- Native speakers: (2,400 cited 1999)
- Language family: Austronesian: Malayo-Polynesian; Oceanic; Northwest Solomonic; New Georgia – Ysabel; New Georgia; Roviana–Kusaghe; Hoava; Kusaghe
- Dialects: Kusaghe; Njela

Language codes
- ISO 639-3: ksg
- Glottolog: kusa1251

Kusaghe is a dialect of Hoava, an Oceanic language, spoken by about 2,400 people on New Georgia Island, Solomon Islands.
