= Komba language =

Language of Papua New Guinea

Komba
- Neng Den
- Native to: Papua New Guinea
- Region: Huon Peninsula, Morobe Province
- Native speakers: (15,000 cited 2000)
- Language family: Trans–New Guinea: Finisterre–Huon; Huon; Western Huon; Komba

Language codes
- ISO 639-3: kpf
- Glottolog: komb1273

Komba is a Papuan language spoken in Morobe Province, Papua New Guinea.
