= Mesem language =

Huon language spoken in Papua New Guinea

Mesem
- Native to: Papua New Guinea
- Region: Huon Peninsula, Morobe Province
- Native speakers: (4,000 cited 1997 census)
- Language family: Trans–New Guinea: Finisterre–Huon; Huon; Western Huon; Mesem

Language codes
- ISO 639-3: mci
- Glottolog: mese1244

Mesem (Mesẽ) is a Papuan language spoken in Morobe Province, Papua New Guinea.

== Names ==
The alternate names for Mesem are Mese, Momalili, and Momolili.

== Phonology ==
=== Consonants ===
The table below shows Mesem's consonantal phonemes:

	Bilabial		Alveolar		Velar	
Nasal	m		n		ŋ	
Plosive	p	b	t	d	k	ɡ
Fricative	s, z					
Approximant	j					
Lateral approximant	l					

The language also has /w/, which is a voiced labio-velar fricative, not an approximant.

=== Vowel ===
The table below shows Mesem's vowel phonemes:

	Front	Central	Back
Close	i		u
Mid	e	ʉ	o
Open		a	

== Orthography ==
Mesem alphabet
a	ã	b	d	e	ẽ	g	i	ĩ	k	l	m	n
ng	o	õ	p	s	t	u	ũ	ʉ	ʉ̃	w	y	z
