= Sene language =

Papuan language

Sene
- Native to: Papua New Guinea
- Region: Huon Peninsula
- Extinct: 1980s
- Language family: Trans–New Guinea: Finisterre–Huon; Huon; Eastern Huon; Sene

Language codes
- ISO 639-3: sej
- Glottolog: sene1263
- ELP: Sene

Sene is an extinct Papuan language spoken in Morobe Province, Papua New Guinea.
