= Motek Cultural Initiative =

Israeli-Canadian cultural organization

- Let the sounds of Israel inspire the world!
- Founded: July 2011 by Ravid Dahan in Canada
- Type: Non-profit; NGO
- Location: Toronto, Ontario, Canada
- Fields: Israeli music concerts, Israeli musician productions, media attention, public reputation management
- Website: www.motektoronto.com

Motek Cultural Initiative was established in 2011 in Toronto, Ontario, Canada in order to showcase Israeli music. Its programs include annual galas, concerts, music festivals, workshops, lectures, advocacy events, and Q&A sessions. Motek is Hebrew slang for "Sweetheart". Like "Mon Cheri", and "Habibi" it is a gender-neutral term of endearment.

== History ==
Upon moving to Canada from Israel, it became evident to Motek's founder, Ravid Dahan, that few organizations in North America were celebrating Israeli musical artists in their programming, even though there was a growing demand for it in Jewish and world music communities. Having worked with the most prominent talents, including Israel's top-ten musical artists, Ravid created Motek to promote Israeli music while bridging the gap between local Jewish and Israeli communities. The charity hosts an annual gala in Toronto venues.

== Events ==
Event	Date
A Night for Gilad Shalit	March 15, 2009
Celebrate Tel Aviv's 100th anniversary	June 4, 2009
Celebration of Multicultural World Music	November 4, 2009
Toronto's biggest Purim Party	February 28, 2010
Nuit Blanche Arts Festival	October 2, 2010
MOTEK's Fan Member Event	February 2010
Celebration of Israeli Independence Day	April 20, 2010
Legendary Musician Shalom Hanoch	March 3, 2011
Purim Party	March 12, 2011

== First annual gala ==
On March 18, 2012, Motek's inaugural gala and concert featured The Idan Raichel Project, accompanied by a 10-piece orchestra. The concert, held at the Queen Elizabeth Theatre (Toronto) in Toronto had a sold-out crowd of 1,500. The Moroccan themed after party featured belly-dancers, DJ's, and authentic cuisine.

== Second annual gala ==
On April 28, 2013, Tel-Aviv was transported to Toronto with Motek's Is Rock second annual gala featuring rock band Mashina, hip-pop band Hadag Nahash and Yael Deckelbaum. The celebration of Israeli culture gave audiences music, cuisine and a market place.

== Third annual gala ==
On May 10, 2014, Motek hosted its third annual gala in association with Massey Hall. An audience of 2,500 enjoyed a Canadian/Israeli experience with a fusion of Middle Eastern, West African, Latin American, Indian and Caribbean sounds. Musicians included The Idan Raichel Project, singer Raichel, and a 10-piece orchestra.

== Fourth annual gala ==
On May 7, 2015 Motek hosted its fourth annual gala, featuring Shlomi Shabat accompanied by a 12 piece ensemble. The concert was held at the Queen Elizabeth Theatre (Toronto) in Toronto.

== Sponsorship ==
Motek offers sponsorship opportunities to fund the distribution of Israeli artists in North America.
