= Kinalakna language =

Papuan language

Kinalakna
- Native to: Papua New Guinea
- Region: Huon Peninsula
- Native speakers: (310 cited 2000 census)
- Language family: Trans–New Guinea: Finisterre–Huon; Huon; Western Huon; Kinalakna

Language codes
- ISO 639-3: kco
- Glottolog: kina1251
- ELP: Kinalakna

Kinalakna is a Papuan language of Morobe Province, Papua New Guinea.
