= Nomu language =

Papuan language of Papua New Guinea

Nomu
- Native to: Papua New Guinea
- Region: Huon Peninsula
- Native speakers: (400 cited 2000 census)
- Language family: Trans–New Guinea: Finisterre–Huon; Huon; Western Huon; Nomu

Language codes
- ISO 639-3: noh
- Glottolog: nomu1240

Nomu is a Papuan language of Morobe Province, Papua New Guinea.
