= Tobo-Kube language =

Papuan language

Kube-Tobo
- Native to: Papua New Guinea
- Region: Huon Peninsula, Morobe Province
- Native speakers: (7,500 Kube (2000 census), 2,230 Tobo cited 1980 census)
- Language family: Trans–New Guinea: Finisterre–Huon; Huon; Eastern Huon; Kube-Tobo

Language codes
- ISO 639-3: Either: kgf – Kube tbv – Tobo
- Glottolog: kube1244

Kube (Hube) and Tobo, also Mongi, are a Papuan language spoken in Morobe Province, Papua New Guinea. They are mutually intelligible and 95% lexicostatistically cognate. Dialects of Kube include Kurungtufu and Yoangen (Yoanggeng).

The Kube alphabet includes the letter Q with hook tail, ⟨Ɋ ɋ⟩.

== Phonology ==
=== Vowels ===
| | Front | Central | Back |
|---|---|---|---|
| High | i | | u |
| Mid | e | ə | o |
| Low | | a | |

=== Consonants ===
| | Labial | Alveolar | Palatal | Velar | Labiovelar | Glottal |
|---|---|---|---|---|---|---|
| Voiceless plosive | p | t | | k | k͡p | ʔ |
| Voiced plosive | b | d | | ɡ | ɡ͡b | |
| Nasal | m | n | | ŋ | | |
| Voiceless affricate | | t͡s | | | | |
| Voiced affricate | | d͡z | | | | |
| Fricative | f | s | | | | h |
| Trill | | r | | | | |
| Lateral | | l | | | | |
| Approximant | | | j | | w | |
