= Tulishi language =

Kadu language of Kordofan, Sudan

Tulishi
- Kuntulishi
- Native to: Sudan
- Region: South Kordofan
- Ethnicity: Tulishi
- Native speakers: 2,500 (2007)
- Language family: Nilo-Saharan: Kadugli–Krongo; Western; Tulishi
- Dialects: Logoke; Turuj; Tulishi; Kamdang; Minjimmina
- Writing system: Latin

Language codes
- ISO 639-3: tey
- Glottolog: tuli1249
- ELP: Tulishi
- Tulishi is classified as Severely Endangered by the UNESCO Atlas of the World's Languages in Danger.

Tulishi (Kuntulishi, Thulishi, Tulesh) is a Kadu language spoken in South Kordofan. Dialects are Tulishi proper and Kamdang.

== Dialects and locations ==
Ethnologue (22nd edition) lists dialects as:

- Tulishi, Kamda (Kamdang)
- Dar El Kabira (Logoke, Minjimmina, Truj, Turuj)

The Dar el Kabira and Kamdang dialects are reportedly similar.

Villages are Aabiisa, Aliyooro Manadaha, Jebels Tulishi, Kamdang, Kirakaati, Laati, Lawwa, Nattilongke, Ntukungnge, and Thudhi in South Kordofan state.
