= Keiga language =

Kadu language of Kordofan, Sudan

Keiga
- Keiga-Timero
- Native to: Sudan
- Region: South Kordofan
- Ethnicity: Keiga
- Native speakers: (6,100 cited 1984)
- Language family: Nilo-Saharan?: Kadu; Kadugli-Krongo; Keiga
- Dialects: Demik; Aigang
- Writing system: Latin

Language codes
- ISO 639-3: kec
- Glottolog: keig1242
- ELP: Keiga
- Keiga is classified as Severely Endangered by the UNESCO Atlas of the World's Languages in Danger.

Keiga, Yega, or Deiga is a Nilo-Saharan language of the Kadu branch spoken in South Kordofan, Sudan. Dialects are Demik (Rofik) and Keiga proper (Aigang).

Keiga is a VSO language. Reh (1994) instead uses the name Deiga or Dayga, with a prefix d- instead of the place prefix k-.

== Demographics ==
Stevenson (1956; 1957) originally called the language Keiga, after the places where it is mainly spoken, namely Keiga Timmero, Keiga al-Kheil and Keiga Lubun. The local name for the language is sani m-aigaŋ 'speech of Keiga' (Stevenson 1956: 104). Stevenson (1956: 104) considers it to be a language cluster consisting of two dialects, Keiga proper and Demik, with a total number of approximately 7,520 speakers (with 1,504 taxpayers).

=== Villages ===
Keiga is spoken in the following villages according to the 22nd edition of Ethnologue:

- Ambong (Àmbóŋ) area: Ambong, Ambongadi, Arungekkaadi, Bila Ndulang, Kandang, Kuluwaring, Lakkadi, Roofik, Saadhing, Taffor, and Tingiragadi villages
- Lubung (Lùbúŋ) area: Kuwaik, Miya Ndumuru, Miya Ntaarang, Miya Ntaluwa, Semalili, and Tungunungunu villages
- Tumuro (Tʊ̀mʊ̀rɔ̀) area: Jughuba, Kayide, Koolo, and Tumuro villages

Blench (2005) identified three dialects, which are Àmbóŋ, Lùbúŋ, and Tʊ̀mʊ̀rɔ̀.

Àmbóŋ villages are as follows. Only Taffor, Kantang, Lak ka aati, and Arungek ka aati villages were reported by Blench (2005) to be inhabited. The rest were abandoned due to the Sudanese Civil War.

Orthographic	IPA	Official name
Ambong	ə̀mbɔ́ŋ	
Taffor	Tə̀ffɔ́r	Jighaiba
Saadhing	Sə́ə́ɖɪ̀ŋ	
Ambong ka aati	ə̀mbɔ̀ŋ kà ə̀ə̀tɪ́	
Kulwaring	Kʊ̀lwə̀rɪ̀ŋ	
Kantang	Kə̀ntə̀ŋ	
Tinkira ka aati	Tɪ́nkɪ̀rə̀ kə́ ə́ə́tɪ̀	
Lak ka aati	Lə̀k kə́ ə́ə́tɪ̀	Turlake
Arungek ka aati	ə̀rʊ́ŋɛ́k kə́ ə́ə́tɪ̀	Shihaita
Mutuju	Mʊ̀tʊ̀jʊ́	

Lùbúŋ villages are as follows. Only Küwëk is inhabited.

Orthographic	IPA	Official name
Küwëk	Kùwék	Kuwaik
Miya Ntarang	Mìyà ntáráŋ	
Miya Ntaluwa		
Tungunungunu		
Se Malili		
Miya Ntumuro		

Tʊ̀mʊ̀rɔ̀ villages are as follows. Only Koolo is inhabited.

Orthographic	IPA
Koolo	Kɔ́ɔ́lɔ̀
Kayëtë	
