= Ono language =

Papuan language

Ono
- Native to: Papua New Guinea
- Region: Huon Peninsula, Morobe Province
- Native speakers: 10,000 (2011)
- Language family: Trans–New Guinea: Finisterre–Huon; Huon; Western Huon; Ono

Language codes
- ISO 639-3: ons
- Glottolog: onoo1246

Ono is a Papuan language spoken in Morobe Province, Papua New Guinea. It is spoken as a second language by a couple thousand speakers of related languages.
