= Krongo Nuba people =

The Krongo Nuba, also known as Korongo, are a sub-ethnic group of the Nuba peoples in the Nuba Mountains of South Kordofan state, in southern Sudan. They speak the Krongo language, a Nilo-Saharan language. They are mostly Catholic. There were 21,688 Krongo in 1984, although the number has since increased.

The Krongo live in the Korongo Hills south of the Nuba Mountains. The etymology for Korongo is possibly derived from the name of a high (uninhabited) hill in the northern Nuba Mountains named Dogorongo.

== See also ==
- Nuba peoples
