= Kumukio language =

Huon language spoken in Papua New Guinea

Kumokio
- Native to: Papua New Guinea
- Region: Huon Peninsula
- Native speakers: (1,100 cited 2000 census)
- Language family: Trans–New Guinea: Finisterre–Huon; Huon; Western Huon; Kumokio

Language codes
- ISO 639-3: kuo
- Glottolog: kumu1247

Kumokio is a Papuan language of Morobe Province, Papua New Guinea.
