= Kabba language =

Sara language spoken in central Africa

Kaba
- Kabba of Gore
- Native to: Central African Republic, Chad
- Ethnicity: Sara people
- Native speakers: (72,000 Kaba in CAR cited 1996, and 11,000 in Chad cited 1971)
- Language family: Nilo-Saharan?: Central Sudanic; Bongo–Bagirmi; Sara languages; West; Kaba

Language codes
- ISO 639-3: ksp
- Glottolog: kaba1281

Kaba (Kabba), or Kabba of Goré, is a language of the Sara people in Central African Republic and Chad, with around 100,000 speakers.

There are several languages named Kaba, which is a local generic term approximately equivalent to Sara. Kaba of Gore is confusing classified as a Sara rather than as a Kaba language.

Kabba is a tonal language. There are three tones, High (H) Mid (M) and Low (L).

== Phonology ==
=== Consonants ===
		Labial	Alveolar	Palatal	Velar	Glottal
Nasal		m	n	ɲ	(ŋ)	
Plosive	voiceless	p	t		k	(ʔ)
Plosive	voiced	b	d		g	
Plosive	prenasal	ᵐb	ⁿd		ᵑɡ	
Plosive	implosive	ɓ	ɗ			
Affricate	voiceless		(ts)	tʃ		
Affricate	voiced		(dz)	dʒ		
Affricate	prenasal		(ⁿdz)	ⁿdʒ		
Fricative			s			(h)
Tap			ɾ			
Lateral			l			
Approximant		w		j		

- The glottal stop [ʔ] is only heard in word-initial position, before vowels.
- /h/ occurs only in limited distribution.
- Sounds /t, d, ⁿd/ are heard in complimentary distribution with affricate sounds [ts, dz, ⁿdz] when in word initial position before /i/.
- /ɗ/ may have a retroflex [ɽ] or trill [r] allophone, when in intervocalic positions.
- /ɾ/ may also be heard as a retroflex [ɽ] in free variation.
- [ŋ] occurs as an allophone of /n/ when before a velar stop, or when at the end of root words or morphemes.

=== Vowels ===
Oral vowels
	Front	Central	Back
Close	i iː	(ɨ)	u uː
Close-mid	e eː	ə	o oː
Open-mid	ɛ ɛː	ə	ɔ ɔː
Open		a aː	

- /ə/ is heard as [ɨ] when in CVCV open syllables.

Nasal vowels
	Front	Central	Back
Close	ĩ		ũ
Mid	ɛ̃	ə̃	ɔ̃
Open		ã	
