= Krongo language =

Kadu language of Kordofan, Sudan

Krongo
- Dimodongo
- Native to: Sudan
- Region: Kordofan
- Ethnicity: Krongo Nuba
- Native speakers: 54,000 (2022)
- Language family: Nilo-Saharan?: Kadugli–Krongo; Eastern; Krongo
- Writing system: Latin

Language codes
- ISO 639-3: kgo
- Glottolog: kron1241
- ELP: Krongo
- Krongo is classified as Definitely Endangered by the UNESCO Atlas of the World's Languages in Danger.

Krongo, also spelled Korongo or Kurungu and known as Dimodongo, Kadumodi, or Tabanya after local towns, is a Kadu language spoken in the South West of the Nuba Mountains in South Kordofan, Sudan.

Ethnologue lists Angolo, Tabanya, and Toroji in Krongo hills; and Buram, Damaguto, Dar, Dimadragu, and Dimodongo villages.

The speakers themselves refer to the language as "nìinò mó-dì", meaning "language from home".

According to research from 1985, Krongo speakers are usually farmers and live off of cultivating crops like sorghum, beans, sesame, peanuts and corn as well as keeping animals like cattle, sheep, pigs, goats and chickens.

A survey from the year 1976 states that other languages spoken in the surveyed region (here referred to as "Krongo" as well) are Arabic, Dinka, Hausa and very small amounts of other African languages. The most common of these is Arabic with 70% of the 443 surveyed people stating to speak the language, although most of them do not speak it as their mother language. It is rather being used as a lingua franca at the market than at home.

According to the survey, there is a high rate of illiteracy among the people in the Krongo region. Many of the younger children do not know Arabic yet – 90.3% of the people claimed to have learned it after their early childhood. The schools (khalwas) use Arabic as a language of instruction though, which is probably the reason why few of the Krongo people go to school. The majority of the people with a formal education are people who speak Arabic as their mother language and/or men.

The Krongo, like other Nuba, are predominantly Muslim people.

== Phonology ==
The language of Krongo contains both phonemic long and short consonants and vowels.

Short Consonant Phonemes
	Labial	Dental/Alv.	Retroflex	Palatal	Velar
Plosives	/p/	/t/	/ʈ/	/c/	/k/
Implosives	/ɓ/ b	/ɗ/ d			
Fricatives	/f/	/s/		/ʃ/ sh	
Nasals	/m/	/n/		/ɲ/	/ŋ/
Liquids		/l/, /r/			
Semivowels	/w/			/j/ y	

Long Consonant Phonemes
	Labial	Dental/Alv.	Retroflex	Palatal	Velar	Glottal
Plosives	/pp/	/nt/ /tt/	/nʈ/ /ʈʈ/	/nc/ /cc/	/nk/ /kk/	/ʔ/
Implosives	/nɓ/ /ɓɓ/	/nɗ/ /ɗɗ/				
Fricatives	/ff/	/ss/				
Nasals	/mm/	/nn/		/ɲɲ/	/ŋŋ/	
Liquids		/ll/, /rr/				
Semivowels	/ww/			/jj/		

Short Vowel Phonemes
	[+ATR]		[-ATR]	
	[-back]	[+back]	[-back]	[+back]
[+high]	/i/	/u/	/ɪ/	/ʊ/
[+low]		/o/	/a/	
unclear phoneme status	/e/			

Long Vowel Phonemes
	[+ATR]		[-ATR]	
	[-back]	[+back]	[-back]	[+back]
[+high]	/iː/ ii	/uː/ uu		/ʊː/ ʊʊ
[+low]		/oː/ oo	/aː/ aa	
unclear phoneme status	/eː/ ee			

=== Vowels ===
The vowels are divided into the two vowel harmony groups +ATR and -ATR. It is unclear what group /e/ belongs in because it is being used to replace either /ɪ/ or the combination of /j/ and /a/, which are similar sounding. The word for "two" for example can either be written -yáarè or -yáaryà. Unlike /ɪ/, /e/ can also be used in the same word as [+ATR]-vowels though.

The placement of /o/ and /a/ in the vowel harmony groups is based on the circumstance that /o/ can only be found in the same word with [+ATR]-vowels and /a/ can only be found in the same word with [-ATR]-vowels. They are both also found in words together with only consonants and/or with /e/.

=== Consonants ===
In front of long consonants, only short vowels are used. Glottal stops are grammatically treated like long consonants. They occur, for example, in the singular personal pronouns: àʔàŋ 'I', ùʔùŋ 'you', ìʔìŋ 'he'. Out of the long consonants, only /ff/ is known to occur at the beginning of words, as in ffà 'tree'. The long consonant /ŋŋ/ is very rare, but occurs for example in the word àŋŋá 'we'. /p/ and /pp/ are rare as well. They occur for example in loan words from Arabic.

The consonants /k/, /ŋ/, /s/, /t/, and /ʈ/ are palatalized under certain conditions when in front of the vowels /i/ or /ɪ/ or the semivowel /j/. That means that their pronunciation shifts from the back of the mouth to the palatal region to a certain degree, depending on the consonant, on whether it's /j/ or one of the vowels and depending on if it's an initial consonant or within the word.

/ŋ/ is completely palatalized in front of all three sounds, so that it becomes the palatal nasal /ɲ/. For example:

ŋ- + ɪdɪnà	→ ɲídínà	'and he uplifts'	
ŋ- + íicì	→ ɲíicì	'and he is tall'	
ŋ- + yúŋwà	→ ɲúŋwà	'and he is alone'	the /j/ is dropped

For the other mentioned consonants, complete palatalization is only obligatory in front of /j/. In front of /i/ and /ɪ/, it is optional for the velar plosives within a morpheme, but in the initial position they cannot be fully palatalized. For /s/, palatalization is always optional. Thus the pronunciation of the word síkà could look like this:

[sígà] → not palatalized, or

[sʲígà] → palatal secondary articulation, or

[ʃígà] → complete palatalization, change to the palatal fricative.

These palatalization patterns apply to the long consonants as well.

== Syntax ==
Apart from the subject and the direct object, all nominal phrases are being marked with a case prefix according to the verb.
