= Borong language =

Huon language spoken in Papua New Guinea

Borong
- Kosorong
- Native to: Papua New Guinea
- Region: Huon Peninsula, Morobe Province
- Native speakers: (2,200 cited 2000)
- Language family: Trans–New Guinea: Finisterre–Huon; Huon; Western Huon; Borong

Language codes
- ISO 639-3: ksr
- Glottolog: boro1279

Borong is a Papuan language spoken in Morobe Province, Papua New Guinea. Dialects are Kosorong and Yangeborong.

== Phonology ==
=== Consonants ===
Borong has twenty consonants.

		Bilabial	Labio-dental	Alveolar	Palatal	Velar	Labial-velar
Plosive	Voiceless	p (Note: /p, t, k/ are always aspirated [pʰ, tʰ, kʰ] syllable-initially.)		t		k	kp
Plosive	Voiced	b		d		g	gb
Nasal		m		n		ŋ (Note: /ŋ/ is the only consonant that appears word-finally.)	
Trill				r			
Affricate	Voiceless			ts			
Affricate	Voiced			dz			
Fricative			f	s		h (Note: The source uses ⟨h⟩, which is placed in the velar column despite a glottal column in the original table.)	
Approximant				l	j		w

=== Vowels ===
Borong has five short vowels, five long vowels, and a variety of vowel sequences.

Monophthongs
	Front	Central	Back
High	i iː		u uː
Mid	e eː		o oː
Low		a aː	

Vowel sequences
	/i/	/e/	/a/	/o/	/u/
/i/	/ii/	/ie/	/iɑ/	/io/	—
/e/	/ei/	/ee/	/ea/	/eo/	/eu/
/a/	/ɑi/	/ae/	/aa/	/ao/	/ɑu/
/o/	/oi/	—	/oa/	/oo/	/ou/
/u/	—	/ue/	/uɑ/	—	/uu/

== Example ==
Example story
Borong	English
Wala eeŋanoŋ somataurunana lokaeŋ ama laligogo: Mera dologa iyoŋonoŋ somariigi asa jigonoŋ ama oŋoŋ ikawanoŋ neneya kuuya suu ama oŋoŋgi ragi kema laligoŋ kambaŋgia megi. Ii tororo bao gbamo kooŋ komaŋ megi kouro gomaŋtiiŋa rii oroŋ ragi gomaŋ tiiro bao qeŋ ooŋ kotoŋ bao gbamo mendeeŋ oŋoŋgi neŋ kondeeŋ kema kaŋ laligogo. Kianda.	Formerly our leaders made like this: As their young males grew, they were put into the boy's house. All food was forbidden from them. They lived there until an appointed time. Then they took a pig, taros, dancing hats and kundu drums and came forth together, sang and danced the whole night until morning. Then they killed the pig, cooked and cut it into pieces, shared the pig and the taros and gave them to eat. They ate as much as they could and left the leftovers and went home. That's it.
