= Kadu languages =

Small language family of southern Sudan

Kadu
- Tumtum; Kadugli–Krongo
- Geographic distribution: Nuba Mountains of Sudan
- Linguistic classification: Nilo-Saharan?: Kadu
- Subdivisions: Western; Central (Kadugli); Eastern

Language codes
- Glottolog: kadu1256
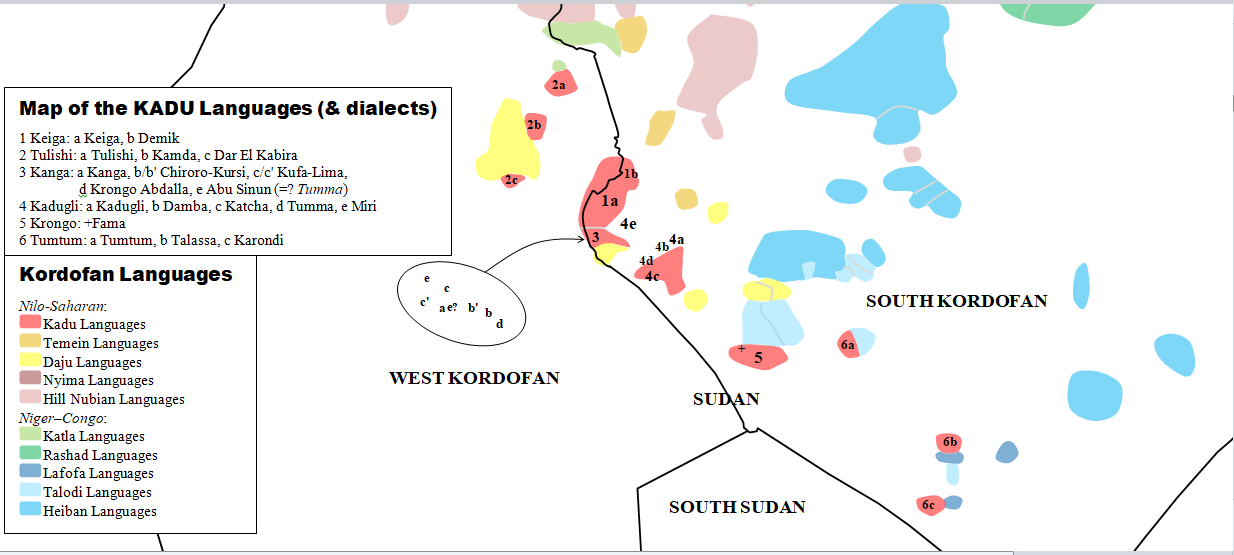

The Kadu languages, also known as Kadugli–Krongo or Tumtum, are a small language family of the Kordofanian geographic grouping, once included in Niger–Congo. However, since Thilo Schadeberg (1981), Kadu is widely seen as Nilo-Saharan. Evidence for a Niger-Congo affiliation is rejected, and a Nilo-Saharan relationship is controversial. A conservative classification would treat the Kadu languages as an independent family.

== Classification ==
Blench (2006) notes that Kadu languages share similarities with multiple African language phyla, including Niger-Congo and Nilo-Saharan, suggesting a complex history of linguistic convergence and contact. However, more recently, Blench states that Kadu is almost certainly Nilo-Saharan, with its closest relationship being with Eastern Sudanic.

Like the Nilotic, Surmic, and Kuliak languages, Kadu languages have verb-initial word order. However, most other languages of the Nuba Mountains, Darfur, and the Sudan-Ethiopia border region have verb-final word order.

== Branches ==
There are three branches:

- Kadu
  - Western: Tulishi, Keiga, Kanga
  - Central: Kadugli (incl. Miri, Katcha)
  - Eastern: Krongo, Tumtum

== Classification ==
Hall & Hall (2004), based on Schadeberg (1987), classify the languages as follows.

- Kadu
  - Keiga
  - - - Kamda, Tulishi
      - - - Damba, Kadugli
          - Miri
          - Katcha, Tuna
        - - Kanga, Kufa, Kursi, Lima, Shororo
          - Krongo-Abdullah, Tumma
    - - Krongo-Tabanya
      - Kurondi, Talasa, Tumtum

Dafalla (2000) compares 179 cognates in Kadugli, Kamda, Kanga, Katcha, Keiga, Kufa, Miri, Shororo-Kursi, and Tulishi. Dafalla's (2000) results are similar to those of Schadeberg (1989).

== Reconstructions ==
Some Kadu quasi-reconstructions by Blench (2006):

Gloss	Proto-Kadu
bone	**-kub-
to cut, split	**deŋ-
to dance, sing, play	**bila
give	**-ɲa
head	**-tu
rat, mouse	**-fɛ
five	**turu

== Comparative vocabulary ==
Sample basic vocabulary for Kadu languages:

Language	name of language	name of people	name of locality	eye	eyes	ear	ears	nose	tooth	teeth	tongue	tongues	mouth	mouths	blood	bone	bones	tree	trees	water	eat (imperative)	name	names
Mudo	t̪u-muɗo	ka-muɗo		áyye	ɲéne (e ~ ɪ)	neesɔ	kisínɛ	ɔ́ŋgɔ́rɔk/n-	t̪íŋíni	ííni	ëëdɔ	niŋgɔ́ɔ́dɔ	níínɔ	niináádi	(t̪iŋ-)/aríída	gúba	gubúúni	nde-aadí	k-aadí	ɓííd̪í	urí	ɛrɛ	nɛ́ŋgɛ́rɛ
Yegang	sani ma-yɛgaŋ; d̪-ayga	ka-yɛgaŋ	ɗi ma-yɛgaŋ; k-ɛɛgaŋ	ayyɛ	nigɛ́ɛ́nɛ́	nɔɔsɔ ~ nɔssɔ	anɔ́ɔ́sɔ́	ɓ-/arwɔk (nostril)	t̪ɪŋɪnɪ	kɪɪnɪ	t̪aŋʊɗɔ	anɗɔ́ɔ́nɛ́	niinʊ	namnáád̪í	arid̪ʊ	t̪úŋʊ́ɓa	kooɓá	t̪aŋaɗí	kaaɗí	ɓiid̪i	kurɪ́	ɛrɛ	kɛrɛ́ɛ́nɛ́
Kufo	t̪iŋ-guufɔ	kud̪u maa-guufɔ	kuufɔ	ɛɛ	iyyɛ	nɛɛsɔ́	íʃinɛ	mɔɔrɔ/níŋgɔrɔ	nd̪iŋiní	ŋiini	ŋɔɗɔ	ní-ŋáɗɔ	niinɔ	nitti	r̀ɗʊ	kuɓa	kuɓɔɔni	ffa	fáád̪ánɛ	ɓeeʃi	ʊʊri	ɛɛrɛ	nigirɛɛnɛ
Miri	ti-miri, t̪umma maa-miri	kad̪u maa-miri, kad̪u maa-faɗɔ	ɲɲa maa-miri	ɔɔyɛ	iiyɛ	nɛɛsɔ	isinɛ́	úmb-/nugúŋg-ɔrɔk (nostril)	t̪í-ŋíni	ŋíni	(ŋ)ŋáɗɔ	nagáŋgáɗɔ	niinɔ	niginíínɔ	ariid̪u	t̪uŋuɓa	kuɓʊʊní	ffa	nááfa	ɓiid̪i	ágúrri	ɛɛrɛ	nigirɛɛnɛ
Talla	t̪in-d̪alla	kaa-d̪alla	t̪alla	ayyɛ	iyyɛ	naasɔ	isinɛ́	ámb-/nigáŋg-árɔk	t̪-iŋŋini	iŋŋini	áŋdáɗuk	ni-ŋ́gɔɗɔ	niinɔ	niginíínɔ	ariid̪ʊ	t̪iŋguba	kuba	ffa	nááfa	ɓiid̪i	oori	ɛɛrɛ	nigirɛɛnɛ
Tolibi	t̪ʊn-d̪uunu, t̪umma maa-d̪uunu; t̪olibi[11]	ku-d̪uunu	ku-d̪uunu	ɔɔe	iyye	nɛɛsɔ	iisɛ́nɛ́	ḿbarɔ/nʊgʊ́mbárɔ	t̪íŋ-gini	ii-gini	ŋ́gɔɗɔ	nugúŋgɔ́ɗɔ	niinɔ	náá-, nɛ́ɛ́-níínɔ	(ǹd̪ɛ́!ríídó)/á!ríídó	kʊɓa	kʊɓooní	affá	nnááfa	ɓiid̪i	aguri	ɛɛrɛ	nɪgɛrɛɛnɛ́
Sangali	t̪umma ka-saŋaali	ka-saŋaali	ka-saŋaali	aaya	iiyɛ	naasɔ	easana	ɓ-/nag-ɔŋgɔ́rɔ	cíɲ(g)ini	ágini	a-ŋgɔ́ɗɔ	nɔ-, (n)agʊ-niinʊ	niinʊ	naginíínʊ	ariid̪ʊ	t̪ʊ́gʊ́ɓííní	kúɓííní	fa	afáád̪ana	ɓííjí (j ~ d̪)	agúrí	(ɛ)áárá	nɛgɛ́ráána
Krongo	niinʊ mɔ-ɗi	kad̪u mɔ-ɗi		ɓalí-m-ɔyʊ	(kalí-m-)iiyʊ	nɛaasʊ	nísinɛ	amʊ́ʊ́ni/nɪgámʊʊni	t̪ɪn-jɪnɪ	ɪ-jɪnɪ	cɔɔɗɔ	níjɔɔɗɔ	niinɔ	munɔ́ɔ́d̪i	ʌ́ríd̪ɔ	kúɓʊ́ʊ́í	nugúɓʊ́ʊ́ní	ffa	náfat̪ani	ɓiid̪i	ágʊ́rɪ	yaari	nigíɲaari
Talasa	t̪alasa	kaa-d̪alasa		ayyɛ	kilyá-m-íyyɛ	nɛɛsɔ	nɛ́sínɛ	a-mʊ́ʊ́nɛ/nɛ́ga-	t̪i-giní	níd̪í-giní	t̪ɔŋɔɗɔ́	nid̪ɔ́ŋɔɗɔ́	niina	nim̀naad̪i	ard̪a	kʊ́ɓʊ́ʊ́ní	nʊ́gʊ́ɓʊ́ʊ́ní	ffa	nááfa	ɓiigi	aguri	ɛɛrɛ	

=== Numerals ===
Comparison of numerals in individual languages:

Language	1	2	3	4	5	6	7	8	9	10
Katcha (1)	ŋkɔ́tɔ́	ɛɛɾa	íd̪ɔːna	iɡiiso	it id̪úmú	it id̪úmú úfúń ŋkɔ́tɔ́	it id̪úmú úfúń ɛɛɾa	it id̪úmú úfúń íd̪ɔːna	it id̪úmú úfúń iɡiiso	ad̪aɓaaɡa
Kadugli (Talla dialect) (2)	ŋ́ɡɔ̀ʈɔ̀k / 'ŋ́ɡàʈɔ̀k	ɛ́ːrà	ɔ̀'dɔ́ːnà	í'ɡízò	ù'dúmːù	ǹ̩dɪ̀nà'nɔ́ːɡɔ̀	ʈìˈmízò	ùdúmːúˈdɪ̀stà	ìˈzántà	ɔ̀ˈlɔ́ːnà
Keiga	t̪ɔ́l	arʲáŋ	t̪ɔ̀na	kisːo	t̪ʊ́mʊ	t̪ʊmaɲúŋɡʊ	aŋɗʊ́rkà	abːa	t̪aɲuŋɡaʲ	amdí
Krongo	t-yuŋwa	t-yáaryà	t-yóotòonò	t-yóocìisò	àrwá-tì-nìisò (litː 'hit/beat-SGT-hand')	àttì kí-tì nyúŋwá	àttì kí-tì nyáaryà	àttì kí-tì nyóotòonò	àttì kí-tì nyóocìisò	àttì kí-tì n-árwá-tì-nìiso
Tulishi (Kamda dialect)	kɔ̀ʈːɔ̀k	kɑ̀ːrɑ́ʔ	tɔ́ːnɑ̀ʔ	tíːsòʔ	tʊ̀mːʊ̀ʔ	rɔ̀sːɑ̀ʔ	kɔ́rɖɑ́ʈːɑ̀ʔ	ɑ̀ʈːɑ́ʔ	kɔ́rómɑ́dɔ̀ɓːɑ́	tɔ̀ɓːɑ́ʔ

== See also ==
- Kadu word lists (Wiktionary)

== Notes and references ==
- Dafalla, Rihab Yahia. 2000. A Phonological Comparison of the Katcha Kadugli Language Groups in the Nuba Mountains. M.A. Dissertation, University of Khartoum.
- Schadeberg, Thilo C. 1981. "The Classification of the Kadugli Language Group". Nilo-Saharan, ed. by T. C. Schadeberg and M. Lionel Bender, pp. 291–305. Dordrecht: Foris Publications.
