= Kaba Deme language =

Bongo–Bagirmi language spoken in central Africa

Dem
- Kaba Démé
- Native to: Chad, Central African Republic
- Native speakers: (40,000 in Chad cited 1993) unknown number in CAR
- Language family: Nilo-Saharan?: Central Sudanic; Bongo–Bagirmi; Kaba; Dem

Language codes
- ISO 639-3: kwg
- Glottolog: sara1322

Kaba Démé (Kaba ’Dem, Ta Sara, Sara Deme), or just Dem, is a Bongo–Bagirmi language of Chad and the Central African Republic. It is one of several local languages that go by the names Kaba and Sara.
