= List of military units of Clark Air Base =

Military units of Clark Air Base consisted primarily of United States Army and United States Air Force organizations.

== Major units assigned ==
=== Pre World War II (1919–1940) ===
- 3d Aero Squadron (Observation)*, 2 December 1919 – 14 May 1921

Redesignated 3d Squadron*, 14 May 1921 – 25 January 1923
Redesignated 3d Pursuit Squadron*, 25 January 1923 – 16 June 1938

- 28th Squadron (Bomb), 1 September 1922 – 4 June 1923

28th Bombardment Squadron*, 16 June 1938 – 24 December 1941

=== World War II (1941) ===
- Philippine Department Air Force (September – October 1941)
  Redesignated Far East Air Force (28 October – 24 December 1941)
  - V Bomber Command, 14 November – 24 December 1941
  - 20th Pursuit Squadron, July – December 1941 (P-40B)
  - 14th Bombardment Squadron 16 September 1941 – 1 January 1942 (B-17)
  - 24th Pursuit Group, 1 October – 20 December 1941 (P-40B)
  - 19th Bombardment Group, 26 October – 24 December 1941 (B-17)
  - 30th Bombardment Squadron 23 October – 20 December 1941 (B-17)
  - 93d Bombardment Squadron 23 October – 20 December 1941 (B-17)

=== World War II (1945) ===
- Advance Echelon, Headquarters, Fifth Air Force*, 10 February – 1 April 1945

Redesignated Fifth Air Force 1 April – 30 June 1945

V Bomber Command, – 4 March August 1945
V Fighter Command, – 4 March August 1945

Headquarters, 13th Air Force, 1 January – 20 May 1946
475th Fighter Group, 28 February – 20 April 1945 (P-38)
22d Bombardment Group, 12 March – 4 August 1945 (B-24)
43d Bombardment Group, 16 March – 26 July 1945 (B-24)
317th Troop Carrier Group, 17 March – 24 August 1945
91st Reconnaissance Wing, 24 March – 30 July 1945
421st Night Fighter Squadron, 26 April – 5 August 1945
433d Troop Carrier Group, 31 May – 11 September 1945
35th Fighter Group, 19 April – 28 June 1945 (P-51D)
421st Night Fighter Squadron, 26 April 1945 – 16 July 1945 (P-61)
312th Bombardment Group, May–August 1945 (B-32)
6th Reconnaissance Group, 1 May – 31 July 1945
345th Bombardment Group, 12 May – 25 July 1945
54th Troop Carrier Wing, June–September 1945 (C-47)
201st Mexican Fighter Squadron, June–September 1945 (P-47D)
419th Night Fighter Squadron 10 January 1946 – 7 May 1946 (P-61)
US Navy Fleet Air Wing Seventeen, 26 February – 31 December 1945
(Disestablished in Japan, 2 January 1945)

Patrol Bombing Squadron VPB-104 (PB4Y-1 Liberators), 1 March – 25 October 1945
Patrol Bombing Squadron VPB-119 (PB4Y-2 Privateers), 2 March – 30 October 1945
ACORN-34 : CBMU 606 / CASU 57 / CASU 9.1

310th Bombardment Wing, 23 August – 21 October 1945

=== Postwar Years (1946–1949) ===
- 29th Air Service Group*, 16 February 1946 – 1 January 1947
  - Headquarters, 313th Bombardment Wing 15 March 1946 – 15 June 1948
    - 6th Bombardment Group (VH) 28 January 1946 – 1 June 1947 (B-29)
    - 504th Bombardment Group (VH) 6 March – 15 June 1946 (B-29)
    - 505th Bombardment Group (VH) 14 March – 30 June 1946 (B-29)
    - 9th Bombardment Group (VH) 15 April 1946 – 9 June 1947 (B-29)
- 358th Air Service Group*, 1 January 1947 – 1 July 1949
  - 18th Fighter Wing 16 September 1947 – 1 December 1950 (P/F-47, P/F-51, RB-17G, RB-29 (F-2))
  - Headquarters, 13th Air Force, 1 May 1949 – 2 December 1991
- 24th Air Depot Wing*, 1 July 1949 – 1 December 1950
  - 6204th Photo Mapping Squadron, 16 September 1949 – 1 June 1953
  - 6208th Depot Wing 17 December 1949 – 1 September 1952

=== Cold War (1950–1991) ===
- 6200th Air Base Wing*, 1 December 1950 – 1 February 1953
  Redesignated 6200th Air Base Group, 1 February 1953 – 10 April 1959
  - 581st Air Resupply and Communications Wing 18 July 1952 – 7 September 1953
  - 24th Air Depot Wing, 1 December 1950 – 16 February 1954
  - 6424th Air Depot Wing 16 February – 25 November 1954
  - 26th Fighter-Interceptor Squadron 11 November 1954 – 9 April 1959
  - 509th Fighter-Interceptor Squadron 9 April 1959 – 24 July 1960
- 405th Fighter Wing*, 10 April 1959 – 16 September 1974
  - 64th Fighter-Interceptor Squadron (10 June 1966 – 15 December 1969) F-102A Delta Dagger
  - 509th Fighter-Interceptor Squadron (9 April 1959 – 15 December 1969) Converted from F-86D to F-102A 10 June 1966
  Both F-102 squadrons rotated between Clark and Bien Hoa Air Base and Da Nang Air Base, South Vietnam. Rotational TDY also to Don Muang Royal Thai Air Force Base, Thailand. Inactivated December 1969.
  523rd Tactical Fighter Squadron (20 November 1965 – 31 August 1973) F-100D, F-4C/D Phantom II
  Initially equipped with F-100D, converted to F-4D in 1970. Detachment of squadron maintained at Ching Chuan Kang Air Base, Taiwan. Deployed detachment of F-4Ds to 432d TRW, Udorn Royal Thai Air Force Base during 1972 North Vietnamese Easter Offensive.
  - 69th Military Airlift Support Group 8 July 1966 – 1 January 1972
- 463d Tactical Airlift Wing 15 Dec 1965 – 31 December 1971
  - 29th Tactical Airlift Squadron (C-130B, Tail Code: QB)
  - 772d Tactical Airlift Squadron (C-130B, Tail Code: QF)
  - 773d Tactical Airlift Squadron (C-130B, Tail Code: QG)
  - 774th Tactical Airlift Squadron (C-130B, Tail Code: QW)
    Most aircraft deployed on rotating basis to Tan Son Nhut and Cam Ranh Air Bases, South Vietnam
  - 20th Operations Squadron (C-118, C-124) 1968–1971
- 374th Tactical Airlift Wing (C-130) 15 November 1973 – 30 June 1989
  - 20th Aeromedical Airlift Squadron (C-9)
  - 21st Tactical Airlift Squadron (C-130E)
  - 776th Tactical Airlift Squadron (C-130E) (closed 1975)
- 624th Airlift Wing/624th Tactical Airlift Wing (C-130) 1 July 1989 – 19 December 1991
  - 8th Mobile Aerial Port Squadron (C-130)
  - 624th Aerial Port Squadron (C-130/C-141)
- 3d Tactical Fighter Wing*, 16 September 1974 – 19 December 1991
  - 3rd Civil Engineering Squadron
  - 3rd Security Police Group
    - 3rd Security Police Squadron
    - 3rd Law Enforcement Squadron
    - 6009 Security Police Training Squadron
- 353rd Special Operations Group, April 1989-June 1991 (USSOOCOM/AFSOC)
  - 1st Special Operations Squadron, MC-130H
  - 17th Special Operations Squadron, MC-130P
  - 31st Special Operations Squadron, MH-53J
- 1961st Communications Group (Air Force Communications Command) 1950s - June 1991
- A detachment of United States Air Force Electronic Security Command
- Armed/American Forces Radio Television Service (Far East Network Philippines)
  - 6120th Broadcasting Squadron 1962–1971
  - (re-designated 6204 Broadcasting Squadron 1971–1974)
  - (re-designated 6204 AEROSS 1974–1976)
  - (re-designated Detachment 1, 6204 Broadcasting Squadron 1976-1981?)
  - (re-designated Detachment 1 Air Force Pacific Broadcasting Squadron 1981?-1991

.* Performed Host Unit Mission

== Military units before WWII ==
Clark Air Base was originally established as Fort Stotsenburg in Sapang Bato, Angeles, Pampanga in 1903 under control of the U.S. Army. Officers' quarters and water system constructed 1910–1911 and a flying school was created in 1912. Construction of steel hangars and a dirt air strip 1917–1918; a portion of Ft Stotsenburg officially set aside for the Aviation Section of the Signal Corps and named Clark Fld, September 1919.

The 3d Aero Squadron was assigned to Clark Field in December 1919 and for the next decade functioned as an observer training unit flying a wide variety of mono and biplanes.

In 1922, the 28th Squadron (Bomb) was assigned as a defense force for the Philippines.

Clark served as a landing field for medium bombers and accommodated half of the heavy bombers stationed in the Philippines during the 1930s. In the late summer and fall of 1941, many aircraft were sent to Clark in anticipation of war with Imperial Japan. Six B-17Cs and 29 B-17Ds were serving with the 19th Bombardment Group based at Clark The 14th Bomb Squadron of the 19th Bombardment Group had been transferred to the Philippines in September 1941 in a spectacular trans-Pacific flight to Clark Field, and two more squadrons had flown to Clark in October.

== Military units during WWII ==
Clark and its subordinate airfield at Del Monte were the only airfields in the Philippines capable of heavy bomber operations at the outbreak of World War II.

News of the Pearl Harbor attack was received at about 3 am on 8 December in the Philippines. According to the previously agreed upon plan, if hostilities were to break out, an attack on Japanese bases in Formosa was to be immediately carried out by the 19th Bombardment Group's Fortresses. On 8 December, there were 35 USAAC B-17s in the Philippines, with two squadrons at Clark Field on Luzon with a total of 19 planes, and two squadrons at Del Monte on Mindanao 500 miles to the south with the other 16 B-17s.

For reasons which are still unclear even today, the planned raid on Formosa was delayed. Instead, in order to prevent them from being destroyed on the ground by a Japanese air attack, all flyable B-17s based at Clark Field had been ordered into the air and to patrol the waters around Luzon. In the meantime, General Lewis H. Brereton, General MacArthur's air commander, finally got approval to carry out the strike against Japanese bases on Formosa, and the B-17s were recalled to Clark. When the Fortresses returned to Clark, three of them were equipped with cameras for reconnaissance and the remainder were loaded up with 100-lb and 300-lb bombs in preparation for the planned mission to Formosa.

The three reconnaissance B-17s were taxiing out for the initial photographic mission to Formosa when about 200 Japanese aircraft struck. Unfortunately, all the P-40 fighters had been recalled for refueling and were on the ground. At the end of the day's action, it was apparent that the Japanese had won a major victory. The effective striking power of Far East AF had been destroyed, the fighter strength had been seriously reduced, most B-17 maintenance facilities were demolished, and about 80 men were killed. The sole surviving B-17 had not taken off on the morning alert and had been taken up in the air while the rest were being prepared for the Formosa raid. The Fortresses at Del Monte 500 miles to the south were out of range of the Zeros from Formosa and were left untouched.

At Clark Field, three or four of the damaged B-17s were put back into service. They were joined by the B-17s from Del Monte. By 9 December, reconnaissance missions were being undertaken by the 19th Bombardment Group in search of the Japanese fleet. Also, the 17th Pursuit Squadron (Interceptor), 24th Pursuit Group (Interceptor), based at Nichols Field were transferred to Clark with P-40's.

On 10 December, a Japanese convoy was spotted, and five B-17s were dispatched. This was the first American bombardment mission of World War II. No fighter opposition was encountered, and some hits were recorded on the transports.

That same day, a B-17C piloted by Captain Colin P. Kelly dropped bombs from high altitude on what the crew thought to be a Japanese battleship. Hits were recorded, and a tremendous explosion was observed. Kelly's plane was immediately pounced upon by Zeros, one of which was flown by Saburō Sakai, who was later to become a famous ace. Kelly guided his heavily damaged plane back towards Clark Field. He ordered the crew to parachute to safety, but before Kelly himself could leave, the aircraft exploded, and Kelly was killed.

When the surviving crew was questioned, the report was flashed out that they had sunk the Japanese battleship Haruna, and the mission was hailed as a great victory. Captain Kelly was posthumously awarded the Distinguished Service Cross by President Franklin Roosevelt for his heroism and was written up in glowing press reports. However, information revealed in the immediate postwar years revealed that the Haruna was nowhere near the area at that time and that the ship most likely struck was the cruiser Ashigari, and it was only fairly lightly damaged by the attack.

On 12 December, about 100 Japanese aircraft again hit Clark. The airfield is severely damaged, and plans were made to evacuate the facility. On the 19th, the air echelon of the 93d Bombardment Squadron (Heavy), 19th Bombardment Group (Heavy) were transferred from Clark to Batchelor Field near Darwin, Northern Territory, Australia with B-17's. The ground echelon was attached to the 5th Interceptor Command (Provisional) and sent to fight as infantry on Luzon and Mindanao Islands. On Christmas Eve, HQ 19th Bombardment Group (Heavy) and the air echelon of the 28th Bombardment Squadron (Heavy) were transferred from Clark to Batchelor Field with B-17's. The ground echelon of the 28th were dispatched to fight as infantry on Luzon and Mindanao.

The remaining aircraft and personnel at Clark were evacuated to Australia by 31 December 1941. The base was overrun by Japanese forces less than a week later in early January 1942.

=== Japanese occupation ===
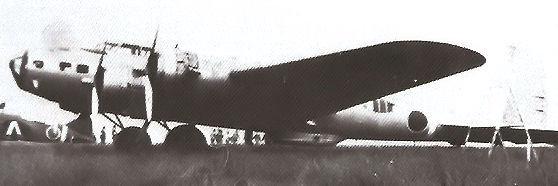
Boeing B-17D Fortress 40-3095 formerly of 11th Bomb Group, 61st Bomb Squadron after being captured at Clark Field, Philippines and being repaired by Japanese. Eventual fate of this aircraft is unknown

During the period of Japanese occupation, Clark was known as Mabalacat Airfield, and several auxiliary airfields constructed and used. Lilly Hill, located near the center of the base (15*11'35.96"N 120*32'05.14"E), was excavated to allow tunnels to be built into its sides for the storage of fuel and munitions in an attempt to protect them from air raids. After the war Lilly Hill (named for the Papanga word for lonely) was so dangerous, because of the large number of unexploded bombs, the jungle was allowed to overtake the hill for a decade. When it was finally reclaimed at least one Japanese fighter aircraft was found to have crashed there. The Japanese also dug tunnels and built stone revetments in the ridge line at the north side of Clark (15*13'03.83"N 120*32'05.14"E). The Americans later built their northern bomb storage facility at the east end of the ridge, the horse stables on the southern side, the rifle range to the north, and the "Elephant cage" to the west.

The airfield was fortified with several Type 88 75 mm AA Guns. Several USAAF B-24 Liberator bombers flying over Clark were shot down by these weapons.

Following the surrender of Bataan in April 1942, American and Filipino prisoners were marched past the main gate of the airfield during the Bataan Death March

In late 1944, with the tide of the war turning against the Japanese, Vice Admiral Takijirō Ōnishi decided to form a suicide attack force, the Special Attack Unit. In a meeting at Mabalacat, on 19 October 1944, Onishi told officers of the 201st Flying Group headquarters that he believed the only way to retain control of the Philippines was to put 250-kg bombs on A6M Zero fighter planes and crash them into U.S. carriers, to wreak havoc on the U.S. Fleet and disable them for weeks.

Commanded by Ōnishi, the first Kamikaze missions were launched from Clark Air Base. The first volunteers were 23 pilots of the Imperial Japanese Navy's 201st Kōkūtai, 1st Air Fleet. These were divided into four separate groups: Shikishima, Yamato, Asahi and the Yama Yukio Seki units.

At 07:25 on 25 October 1944, the Shikishima unit departed Clark led by Lieutenant Yokjo Seki. At 10:45 am they attacked U.S. ships stationed at Leyte, Philippines during the Battle of Leyte Gulf. Five Zeros, led by Seki, and escorted to the target by leading Japanese ace Hiroyoshi Nishizawa, attacked several escort carriers. One Zero attempted to hit the bridge of the USS Kitkun Bay but instead exploded on the port catwalk and cartwheeled into the sea. Two others dove at USS Fanshaw Bay but were destroyed by anti-aircraft fire. The last two ran at the USS White Plains, however one, under heavy fire and trailing smoke, aborted the attempt on the White Plains and instead banked toward the USS St. Lo, plowing into the flight deck. Its bomb caused fires that resulted in the bomb magazine exploding, sinking the carrier.

=== 1945 recapture ===
Clark Air Base was recaptured by Americans in January 1945 after three months of fierce fighting. Elements of the Sixth U.S. Army cleared most Japanese from the Fort Stotsenburg-Clark Field area and flying activity commenced using the least damaged runway while the field still drew Japanese fire on 25 January 1945; saboteurs and infiltrators sporadically damaged parked aircraft until 10 February 1945.

Clark was used as an operational base for several groups in the closing months of the war in the southwest Pacific. Operational units flying from Clark were:

- 475th Fighter Group (P-38 Lightning) - flew many missions to support ground forces on Luzon during the first part of 1945. Also flew escort missions to China and attacked railways on Formosa.
- 22d Bombardment Group (Heavy) (B-24 Liberator) - Bombed Japanese airfields, shipping, and oil installations in Borneo, Ceram, and Halmahera.
- 43d Bombardment Group (Heavy) (B-24) - Struck industries, airfields, and installations in China and Formosa; and supported ground forces on Luzon.
- 35th Fighter Group (P-51D Mustang) - Operated in support of ground forces on Luzon. Also escorted bombers and completed some fighter sweeps to Formosa and China.
- 421st Night Fighter Squadron (P-61 Black Widow) - Flew night intruder missions against Japanese airfields and ground installations. Also provided protection of B-29 bases on Saipan against night attacks and flew combat air patrols and interception missions.
- 312th Bombardment Group - Performed operational combat testing of Consolidated B-32 Dominator Bomber. The first combat mission took place on 29 May 1945 with a strike against a Japanese supply depot in Luzon's Cagayan Valley. This raid was followed by a series of attacks on Japanese targets in the Philippines, in Formosa, and on Hainan Island in the Tonkin Gulf.

== Military units during the Cold War ==
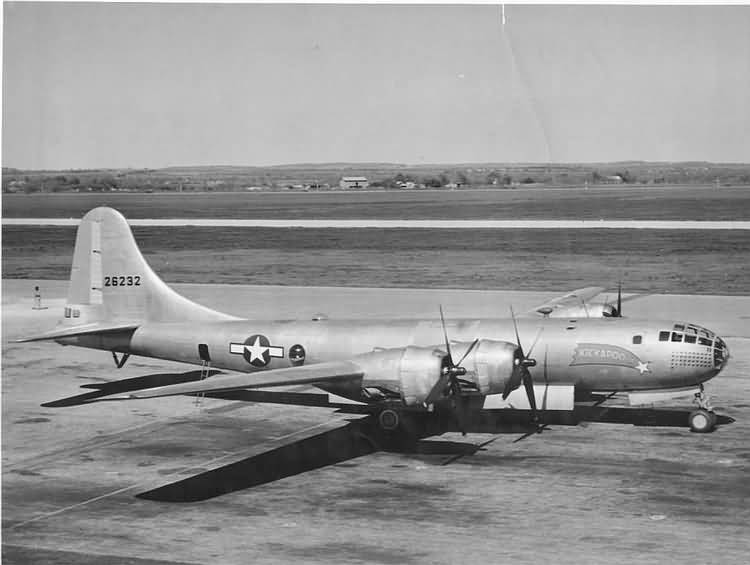
B-29 Superfortress

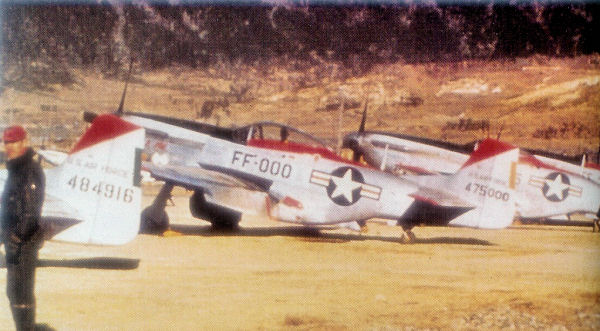
18th TFW F-51Ds in Korea

With the end of the war in September 1945, Clark became an immediate dumping ground for aircraft of all types from inactivating fighter and bomber units in the southwest Pacific. Aircraft were flown to Clark and the pilots (along with aircrews and maintenance and support personnel) would get on transports back to the United States for discharge. Many of the aircraft (some almost brand-new) were scrapped although low-hour planes were retained and flown back to the United States storage fields and mothballed.

The 20th Air Force 313th Bombardment Wing with four Boeing B-29 Superfortress (6th, 9th, 504th, 505th) Very Heavy bomb groups were reassigned from North Field (Tinian) on 13 March 1946. Between 1946 and 15 June 1948, all of these groups were reassigned or inactivated:

- 6th Bombardment Group -> Kadena AB, Okinawa (1 June 1947)
- 9th Bombardment Group -> Harmon Field, Guam, (9 June 1947)
- 504th Bombardment Group -> Inactivated 15 June 1946.
- 505th Bombardment Group -> Inactivated 30 June 1946.

On 14 March 1947, the U.S. and the Philippines signed the Military Bases Agreement which provided for use of Clark Air Base until the year 2046 (later amended by the 1966 Rusk-Ramos agreement to 1991).

The 18th Fighter Group was assigned to Clark on 16 September 1947. The 18th was the major Far East Air Force unit in the Philippines in the immediate postwar years, flying a mixture of fighter (P/F-47, P/F-51, F-80), and reconnaissance (RB-29, RB-17G) aircraft. The 18th Flew patrols and trained with P-80 Shooting Stars, with the distinction of being the first overseas fighter unit to be jet-equipped. On 20 January 1950, the wing was re-designated the 18th Fighter-Bomber Wing. As a result of the Korean War, the 18th was reassigned from Clark to Pusan AB, South Korea on 1 December 1950.

During the Korean War, the 6204th Photo Mapping Squadron was deployed for three months in 1950 performing aerial mapping of both North and South Korea before being replaced. The unit flew adapted Boeing B-17s (as RB-17Gs) for photographic mapping by having its bombing equipment deleted and replaced by photographic equipment. Some cameras were installed in the nose and in the aft fuselage as well.

During the Korean War and First Indochina War (1950–1954), the 581st Air Resupply and Communications Wing performed psychological warfare and unconventional operations. Conducted limited operations in French Indochina in 1953 with C-119, B-29, C-54, and C-118 aircraft.

During the immediate postwar years and throughout the 1950s, Clark's mission was that of a major supply and maintenance depot for Far East Air Forces (later Pacific Air Forces) along with being a command base with Headquarters, 13th Air Force taking up residence in 1949. 13th Air Force would remain at Clark until its closure in 1991.

The 39th Air Division at Misawa AB, Japan deployed the 26th, and later the 509th Fighter-Interceptor Squadrons to Clark from 1954 to 1960 flying F-86D and F Sabres to provide air defense of the Philippine Islands.

=== 405th Fighter Wing ===
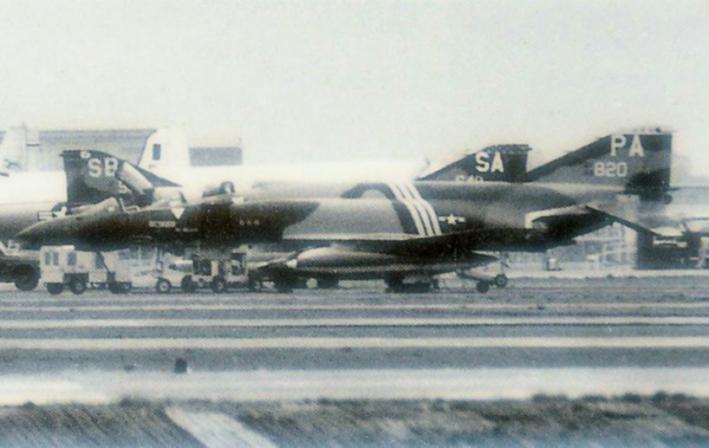
F-4C 64-0820 1st TFS 405th FW, Clark AB February 1975

A change of mission occurred at Clark with the activation of the 405th Fighter Wing on 4 September 1959, replacing the 6200th Air Base Wing. The mission changed from that of being a support depot and maintenance facility to that of an operational fighter wing.

The mission of the 405th was to provide air defense and offensive fighter operations in the Philippines, Taiwan and other Far Eastern points. The wing had numerous TDY squadrons attached over its operational lifetime at Clark. The following operational squadrons assigned to the wing were:

- 510th Tactical Fighter Squadron (9 April 1959 – 16 March 1964) F-100D Super Sabre
- 8th Bombardment Squadron (18 November 1964 – 15 January 1968) B-57A Canberra
- 13th Bombardment Squadron (18 November 1964 – 15 January 1968) Martin B-57A

Both Bombardment Squadrons reassigned to 35th TFW, Phan Rang Air Base, South Vietnam, January 1968.

- 64th Fighter-Interceptor Squadron (10 June 1966 – 15 December 1969) F-102A Delta Dagger
- 509th Fighter-Interceptor Squadron (9 April 1959 – 15 December 1969) Converted from F-86D to F-102A 10 June 1966

Both F-102 squadrons rotated between Clark and Bien Hoa Air Base and Da Nang Air Base, South Vietnam. Rotational TDY also to Don Muang Royal Thai Air Force Base, Thailand. Inactivated December 1969.

- 523rd Tactical Fighter Squadron (20 November 1965 – 31 August 1973) F-100D, F-4C/D Phantom II
  Initially equipped with F-100D, converted to F-4D in 1967. Detachment of squadron maintained at Ching Chuan Kang Air Base, Taiwan. Deployed detachment of F-4Ds to 432d TRW, Udorn Royal Thai Air Force Base during 1972 North Vietnamese Easter Offensive.
- 1st Test Squadron (30 April 1970 – 16 September 1974) F-4C/D
- 90th Tactical Fighter Squadron (15 December 1972 – 16 September 1974) F-4D/E/G
- 774th Tactical Airlift Squadron (31 December 1971 – 15 September 1972) C-130 Hercules, C-118

During the Vietnam War, the wing provided air defense training for Royal Thai Air Force personnel, from Don Muang Royal Thai Air Force Base, Thailand from November 1961 – February 1966. From mid-1962 until the end of the conflict in Southeast Asia, the wing frequently deployed assigned and attached components to bases in Thailand and South Vietnam for air defense and combat operations under operational control of other organizations.

When not so involved, components trained in air defense and other tactical exercises in Taiwan and the Philippines. During July–August 1972, provided extensive flood relief to Philippine areas inundated by monsoon rains. During February–March 1973, provided medical, logistical, and administrative support for former American prisoners of war, on their way to the United States from North Vietnam.

=== 3d Tactical Fighter Wing ===
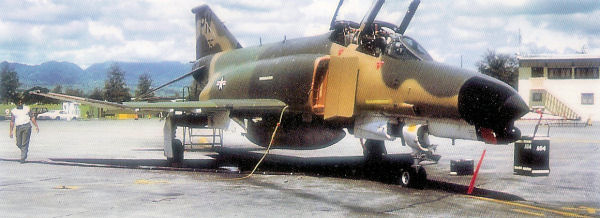
McDonnell Douglas F-4E-42-MC Phantom Serial 69-0275 of the 90th TFS/3d TFW Clark AFB, Philippines, 1979

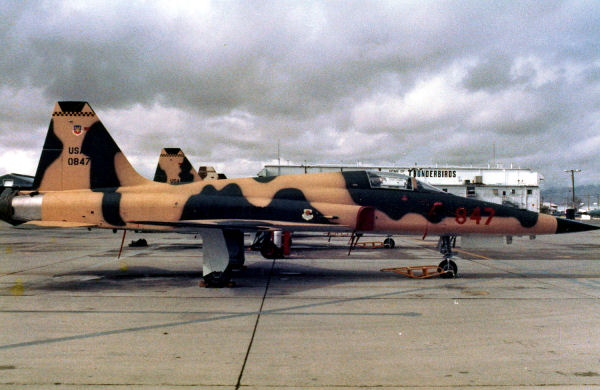
Northrup F-5E Tiger IIs of the 26th Training Aggressor Squadron at Clark AB, serial 73-0847 in foreground

After the end of the Vietnam War, the 3d Tactical Fighter Wing was reassigned to Clark without personnel or equipment from Kunsan AB, South Korea on 16 September 1974, replacing the 405th Fighter Wing which was inactivated in place.

The 3d TFW assumed the mission of the former 405th and provided tactical air defense of the Philippines. It participated in frequent operational exercises and evaluations. Between 5 April and 31 May 1975, the wing used its facilities as a staging area for Operations Babylift (evacuation of Vietnamese Orphans from South Vietnam to the United States) and New Life (Evacuation of Vietnamese Adults to the United States for resettlement). Provided PACAF aircrews with realistic training in dissimilar aerial combat and current intelligence on enemy air-to-air capabilities and tactics, 1976–1989.

Operational squadrons of the 3d TFW were:

- 1st Test Squadron (16 September 1974 – 30 September 1978) F-4E
- 90th Tactical Fighter Squadron (16 September 1974 – 16 December 1991) F-4E/G
  Converted to "Wild Weasel" role in 1979 when converting to F-4G.
- 3d Tactical Fighter Squadron (1 December 1975 – 16 December 1991) F-4E
- 26th Aggressor Squadron (2 January 1976 – 21 February 1990) (T-38/F-5E)

The 3d Tactical Fighter Wing was placed on non-operational status with the evacuation of Clark in June 1991.

- The 3d TFS was inactivated 19 December 1991 at Clark. Moved without personnel or equipment and reassigned to 343d FW, Eielson AFB, Alaska as 3d Fighter Training squadron.
- The 90th TFS inactivated 29 May 1991 at Clark. Moved without personnel or equipment and reassigned to 21st TFW, Elmendorf AFB, Alaska as an F-15E Squadron

The Wing deployed six F-4Es to Turkey for Operation Desert Storm in early 1991 where they flew some of that aircraft's last combat sorties.

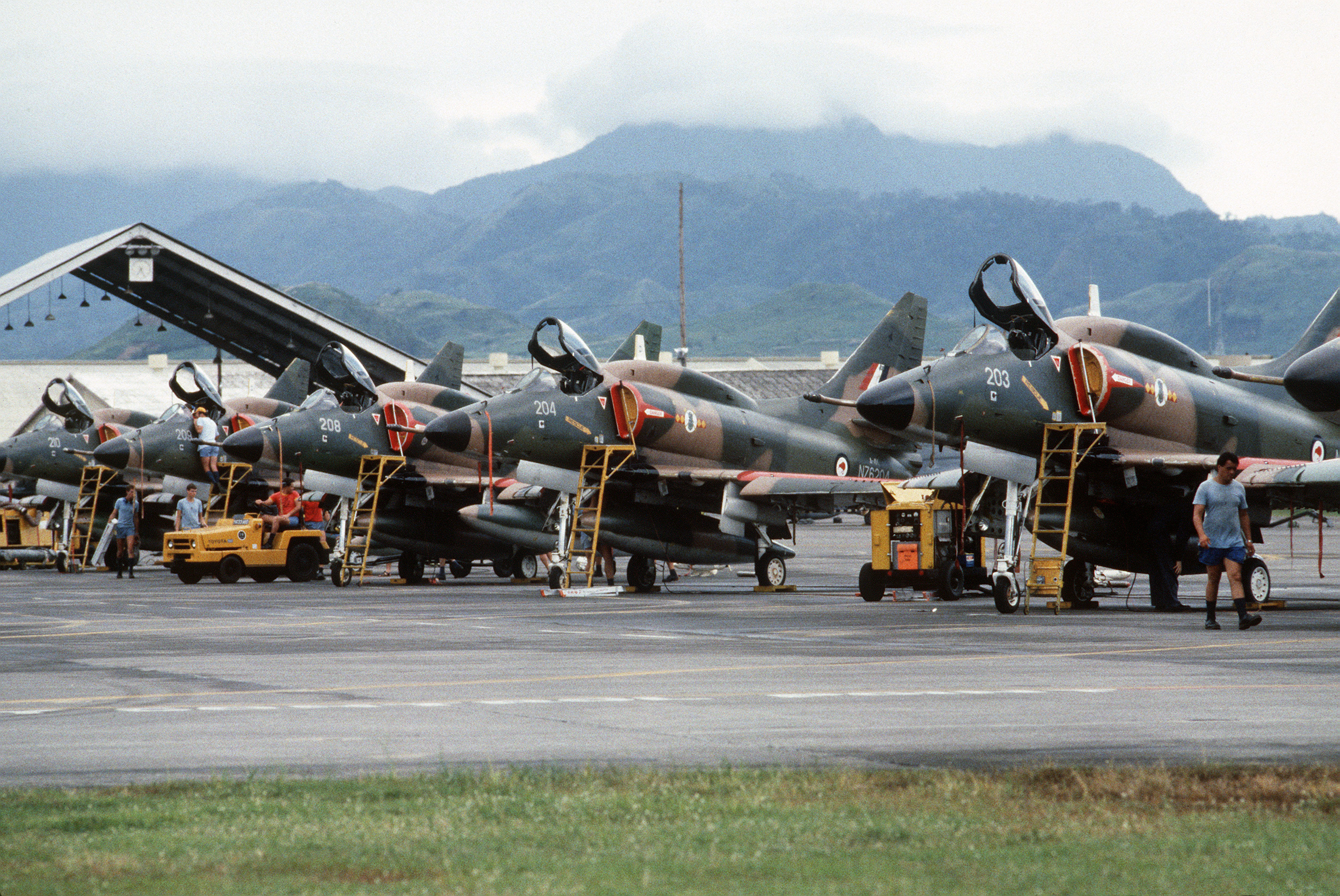
Douglas A-4K Skyhawk aircraft of No. 75 Squadron, Royal New Zealand Air Force, are serviced on the flight line during Exercise Cope Thunder '84-7 on 10 September 1984 at Clark Air Base

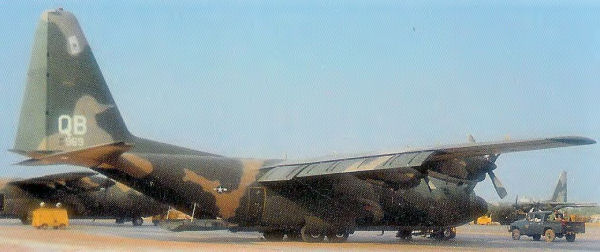
C-130B of the 463d TAW at Ton Son Nuht AB, SVN, 1969

=== Tactical Airlift ===
Between 1968 and 1989, PACAF, and starting in 1974, Military Airlift Command operated a theater airlift capability from Clark.

The 463d Tactical Airlift Wing rotated C-130 squadrons between Clark and Tan Son Nhut Air Base, South Vietnam during the Vietnam War. After the war, the 374th Tactical Airlift Wing operated C-130s within the theater, as well as Aeromedical Evacuation flights.

== See also ==
- History of Clark Air Base
