= 20th Intelligence Squadron =

20th Intelligence Squadron

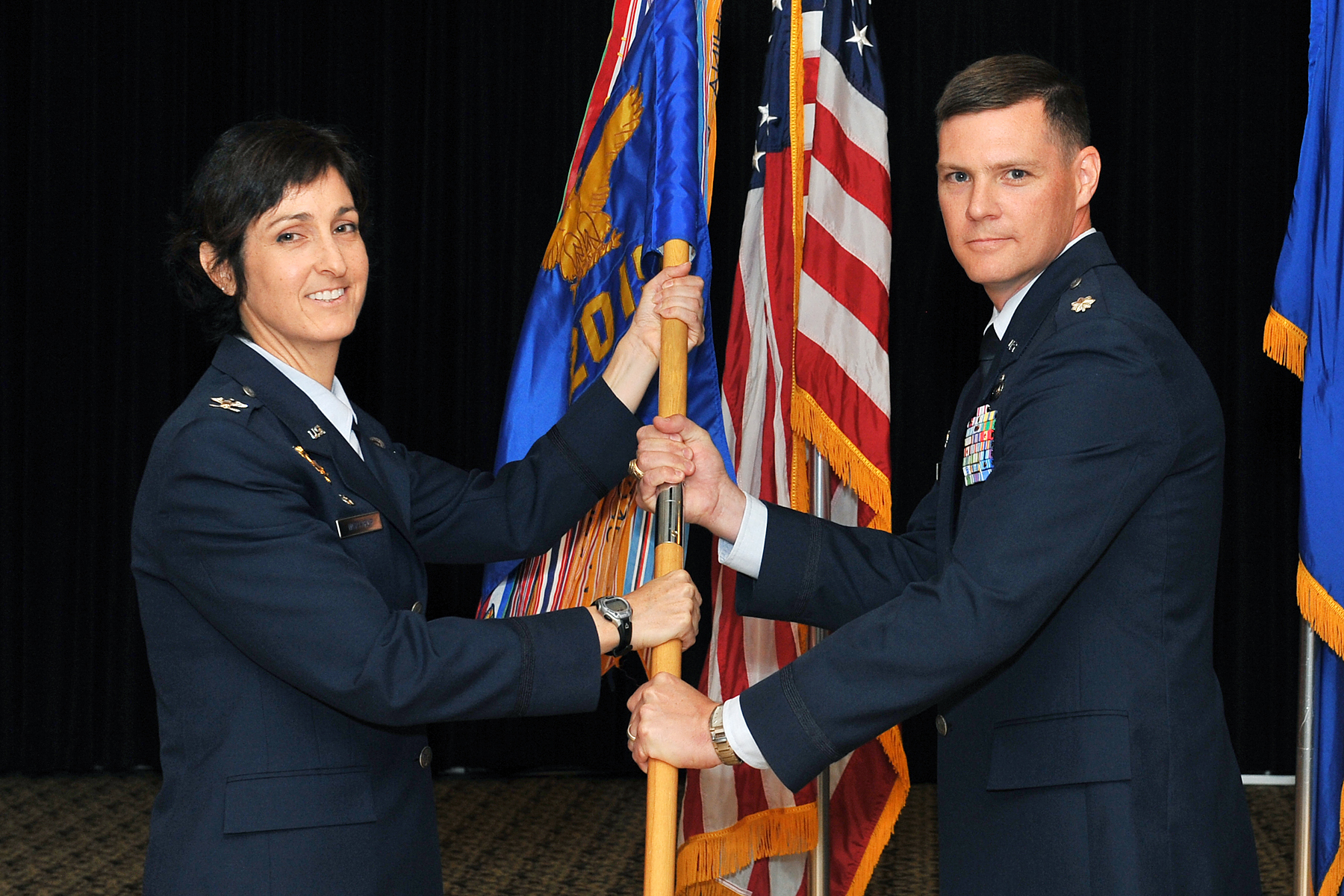
- Col Carol Northrup, Air Force Targeting Center commander, passes the squadron guidon to incoming commander, Lt Col Patrick Sutherland (2011)
- Active: 1942–1946; 1947–1951; 1954–1967; 1992–present
- Country: United States
- Branch: United States Air Force
- Role: Intelligence
- Size: Squadron
- Part of: Air Combat Command
- Garrison/HQ: Offutt Air Force Base
- Mascot(s): Yosemite Sam
- Engagements: Southwest Pacific Theater; Vietnam War
- Decorations: Distinguished Unit Citation; Presidential Unit Citation; Air Force Outstanding Unit Award with Combat "V" Device; Air Force Meritorious Unit Award; Air Force Outstanding Unit Award; Air Force Organizational Excellence Award; Philippine Republic Presidential Unit Citation; Republic of Vietnam Gallantry Cross with Palm

Insignia
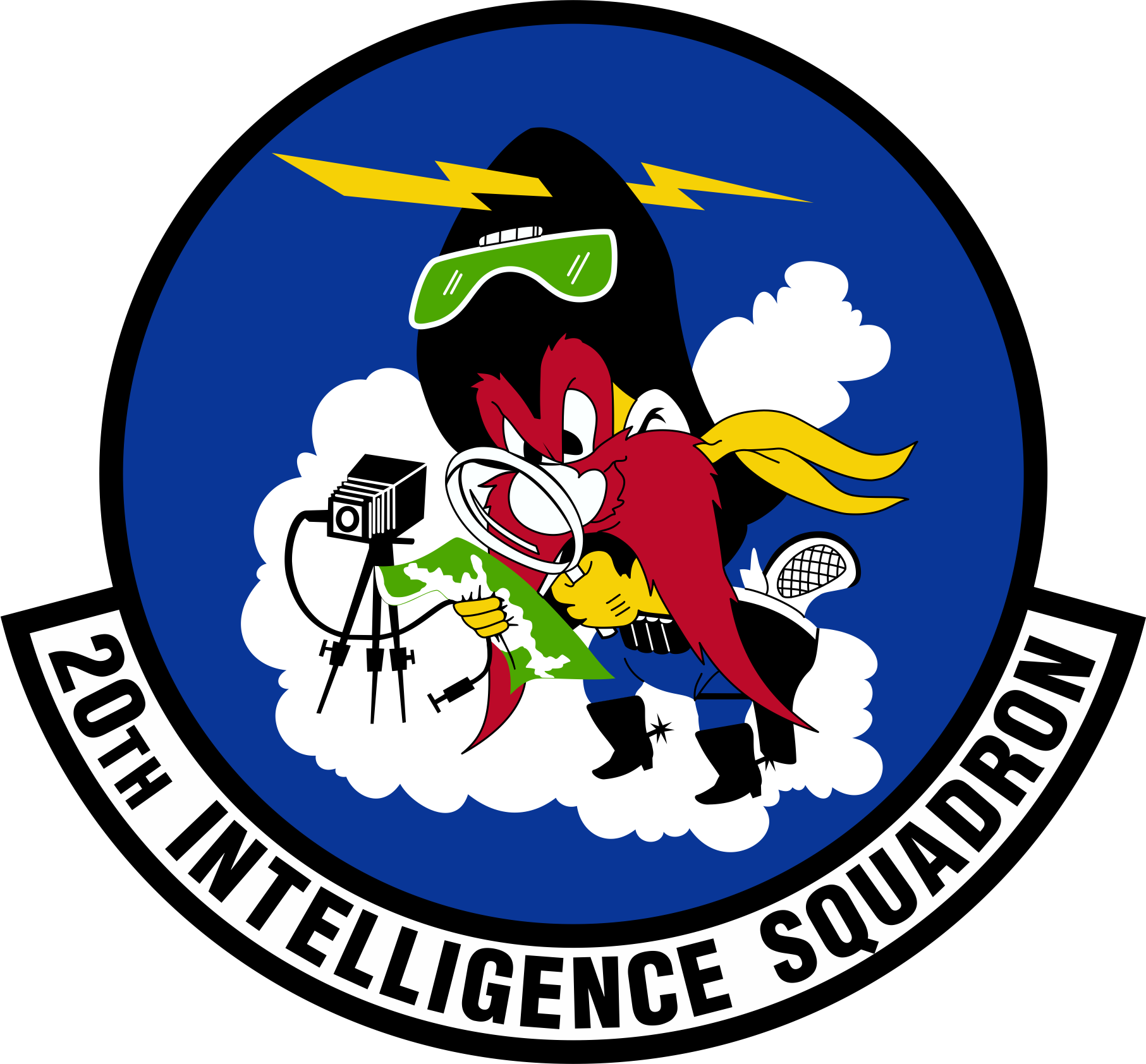
- 20th Intelligence Squadron emblem (approved 7 July 1958)

The 20th Intelligence Squadron is a United States Air Force unit, assigned to the 363d Intelligence, Surveillance, and Reconnaissance Group at Offutt Air Force Base, Nebraska. It has served at Offutt since June 1992, when it was activated as the 20th Air Intelligence Squadron.

The squadron was first activated as the 20th Photographic Mapping Squadron in July 1942. In September 1943, it moved to the Southwest Pacific Theater, engaging in combat mapping missions until V-J Day, moving forward with Allied forces through New Guinea, the Philippine Islands and the Ryuku Islands, earning a Distinguished Unit Citation and a Philippine Republic Presidential Unit Citation. It briefly served with the occupation forces before inactivating in June 1946. As the 20th Reconnaissance Squadron (later 20th Strategic Reconnaissance Squadron), it served in the reserve from 1947 until it was mobilized for the Korean War in 1951. It was inactivated shortly after being called to active duty and its personnel and equipment were used to bring other units up to strength.

The squadron was activated at Shaw Air Force Base, South Carolina in March 1954 as the 20th Tactical Reconnaissance Squadron. It trained in reconnaissance missions, deploying to MacDill Air Force Base during the Cuban Missile Crisis. In 1965, the squadron moved to Southeast Asia, where it flew combat reconnaissance missions until inactivating in November 1967.

== Mission ==
The mission of the 20th is to provide prompt, precise intelligence enabling warfighters to safely engage and achieve global objectives. The 20th processes and analyzes raw electronic intelligence data, and prepares both operational and technical electronic intelligence reports and studies. The 20th is organized into three flights:

- The Target Material Flight produces precise coordinated measurements and mission-support materials for Air Force bomber, fighter and other airborne platforms engaged in exercise, training or actual combat operations.
- The Combat Applications Flight activities entail providing direct application support for specified combat customers. This includes an AIA node for operational dissemination of near-real time imagery to Air Force and Department of Defense users worldwide. The Combat Applications Flight is also Air Combat Command’s point of contact for permission survivability and threat assessments, target analysis, weaponizing support and post-mission combat assessments for the Conventional Air Launched Cruise Missile program.
- The Operations Flight provides the day-to-day operating support to the other flights within the 20th. These activities are dispersed though branches who perform the activities of planning, requirements management, systems maintenance, logistics support and resource management.

== History ==
=== World War II ===
The squadron was originally formed as the 20th Photographic Mapping Squadron in mid-1942. In these early years, the unit worked under several different names and was stationed in the Pacific Theater as an element of Fifth Air Force. The units operated a variety of photographic reconnaissance aircraft in the South Pacific, engaging in combat reconnaissance. It moved to Japan in 1945, carrying out postwar reconnaissance and mapping of the Japanese Home Islands and Korean Peninsula as part of the War Department's Post Hostilities Mapping Project. It was inactivated June 1946

=== Reserve and Korean War ===
The squadron was activated in the reserve in 1947 as the 20th Strategic Reconnaissance Squadron, a long range reconnaissance squadron. It was called to active duty during the Korean War at the start of May 1951. Its personnel were used as fillers for other United States Air Force units and it was inactivated two weeks later.

=== Cold War ===
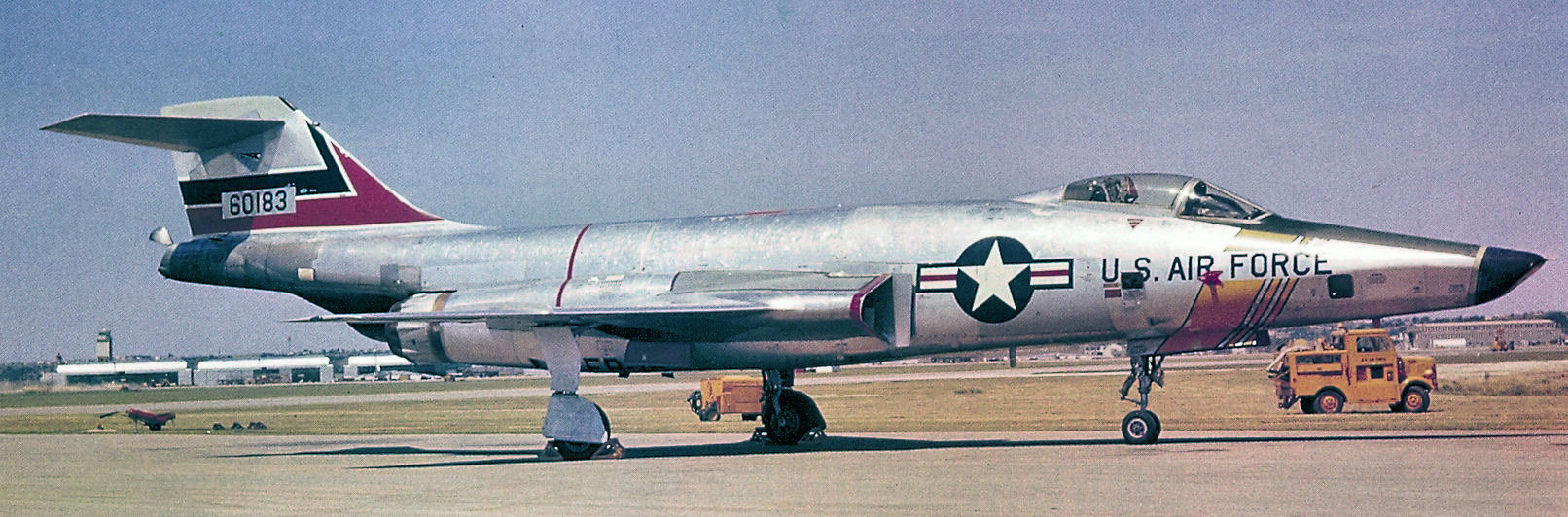
20th TRS McDonnell RF-101C 56-0183 at Shaw AFB, about 1960

The squadron was reactivated in the regular Air Force as the 20th Tactical Reconnaissance Squadron in 1954 under the 432d Tactical Reconnaissance Group as a Lockheed RF-80A Shooting Star reconnaissance training squadron at Shaw Air Force Base, South Carolina. It upgraded to Republic RF-84F Thunderflashes in 1955. The squadron transferred to operational missions in 1959 with reassignment to the 363d Tactical Reconnaissance Wing and re-equipped with McDonnell RF-101 Voodoos. The unit deployed to Florida in 1962 during Cuban Missile Crisis and flew tactical reconnaissance flights over Cuba during the Crisis. It returned to Shaw in late 1962. The squadron deployed to Tan Son Nhut Air Base, South Vietnam, 1963–1965 flying tactical reconnaissance in Southeast Asia. It was inactivated in 1967.

=== Intelligence operations ===
The squadron was reactivated and designated the 20th Air Intelligence Squadron under the newly formed Air Combat Command in 1992, at Offutt Air Force Base, Nebraska. A year later, it was redesignated as the 20th Intelligence Squadron.

== Lineage ==
- Constituted as the 20th Photographic Mapping Squadron on 14 July 1942

Activated on 23 July 1942
Redesignated 20th Photographic Squadron (Heavy) on 6 February 1943
Redesignated 20th Combat Mapping Squadron on 11 August 1943
Redesignated 20th Reconnaissance Squadron, Long Range (Photographic-RCM) (Note: Radio Countermeasures.) on 10 May 1945
Inactivated on 20 June 1946

- Redesignated 20th Reconnaissance Squadron, Night Photographic on 11 March 1947

Activated in the reserve on 25 July 1947
Redesignated 20th Strategic Reconnaissance Squadron, Photographic Mapping on 27 June 1949
Ordered to active service on 1 May 1951
Inactivated on 16 May 1951

- Redesignated 20th Tactical Reconnaissance Squadron, Photographic–Jet on 14 January 1954

Activated on 18 March 1954
Redesignated 20th Tactical Reconnaissance Squadronon 8 October 1966
Discontinued and inactivated 1 November 1967

- Redesignated 20th Air Intelligence Squadron on 1 June 1992

Activated 12 June 1992
Redesignated 20th Intelligence Squadron on 1 October 1993

=== Assignments ===
- 4th Photographic Group (later 4th Photographic Reconnaissance and Mapping Group, 4th Photographic Group), 23 July 1942 (attached to 6th Photographic Reconnaissance and Mapping Group (later 6th Photographic Reconnaissance Group, 6th Photographic Group) after 17 June 1943)
- 6th Photographic Group (later 6th Reconnaissance Group), 5 December 1943
- 91st Reconnaissance Wing, 10 November 1945
- V Bomber Command, 1 December 1945
- 314th Composite Wing, 31 May 1946 – 20 June 1946
- 66th Reconnaissance Group, 25 July 1947
- Tenth Air Force, 27 June 1949
- 311th Air Division, 21 July 1949
- Second Air Force, 1 November 1949 – 16 May 1951
- 432d Tactical Reconnaissance Group, 18 March 1954
- 432d Tactical Reconnaissance Wing, 8 February 1958 (attached to 363d Tactical Reconnaissance Wing after 8 April 1959)
- 363d Tactical Reconnaissance Wing, 18 May 1959
- 2d Air Division, 12 November 1965 (attached to 6240th Combat Support Group)
- 460th Tactical Reconnaissance Wing, 18 February 1966
- 432d Tactical Reconnaissance Wing, 18 September 1966 – 1 November 1967
- 480th Air Intelligence Group (later 480th Intelligence Group), 12 June 1992
- Air Combat Command Targeting and Intelligence Group, 2 June 2008
- Air Force Targeting Center, 7 December 2009
- 363d Intelligence, Surveillance, and Reconnaissance Group, 17 February 2015 – present

=== Stations ===
- Colorado Springs Army Air Base, Colorado, 23 July 1942 – 7 September 1943
- Sydney, Australia, 10 October 1943 (air echelon remained at Colorado Springs Army Air Base to c. 12 October 1943. then at Will Rogers Field, Oklahoma from 14 October 1943 to 26 January 1944)
- Archerfield Airport, Brisbane, Australia, 23 November 1943
- Port Moresby Airfield Complex, New Guinea, 10 December 1943
- Nadzab Airfield Complex, New Guinea, 14 February 1944 (operated primarily from Mokmer Airfield, Biak after 7 August 1944)
- Mokmer Airfield, Biak, 3 September 1944
- Dulag Airfield, Leyte, 15 November 1944 (operated from Mokmer Airfield, Biak to 22 January 1945, Tacloban Airfield, Leyte, Philippines, from 25 January–23 February 1945, McGuire Field, San Jose, Mindoro, Philippines, from 24 February–16 May 1945)
- Clark Field, Luzon, Philippines, 17 May 1945
- Okinawa, Ryukyu Islands, 4 August 1945
- Yokota Airfield, Japan, 27 October 1945 – 20 June 1946 (operated from: Tachikawa Airfield, Japan, December 1945 – April 1946, Johnson Air Base, Japan, after April)
- Newark Army Air Base, New Jersey, 25 July 1947
- Forbes Air Force Base, Kansas, 21 July 1949
- Barksdale Air Force Base, Louisiana, 10 October 1949 – 16 May 1951
- Shaw Air Force Base, South Carolina, 18 March 1954 – 12 November 1965 (operated from: MacDill Air Force Base, Florida, 21 October 1962 – 30 November 1962)
- Tan Son Nhut Airport, South Vietnam, 12 November 1965
- Udorn Royal Thai Air Force Base, Thailand, 1 April 1966 – 1 November 1967
- Offutt Air Force Base, Nebraska, 12 June 1992 – present

=== Aircraft ===
- North American B-25 Mitchell, 1942
- Boeing B-17 Flying Fortress, 1942–1943
- Consolidated B-24 Liberator, 1943–1946
- Consolidated F-7 Liberator, 1943–1946
- Lockheed RF-80 Shooting Star, 1954–1955
- Republic RF-84 Thunderflash, 1955–1958
- McDonnell RF-101 Voodoo, 1957–1967
