= Howard Knox Ramey =

United States Army Air Forces general

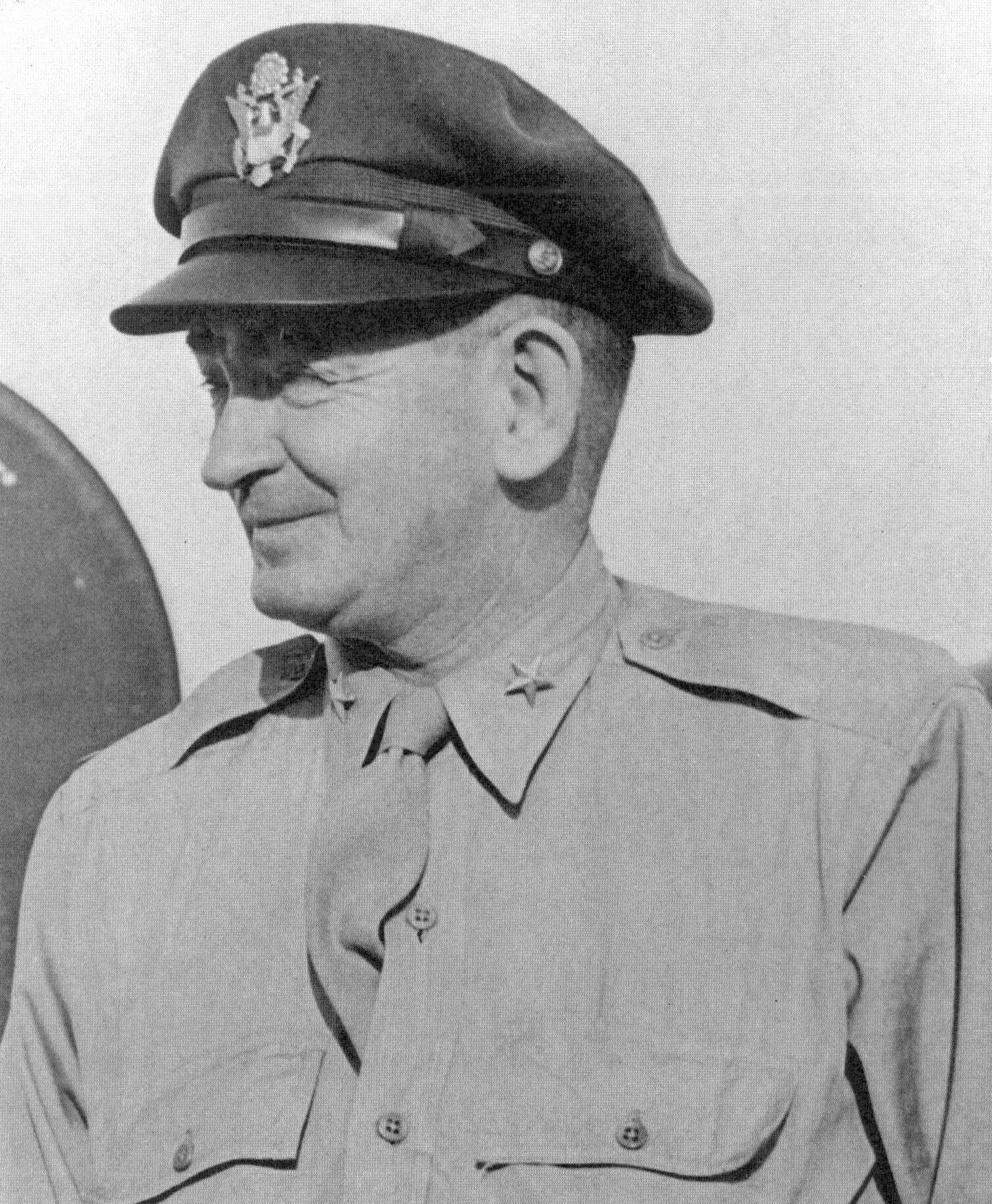
- Brigadier General Howard K. Ramey
- Born: October 14, 1896; Waynesboro, Mississippi
- Died: March 26, 1943 (aged 46); Torres Strait Islands
- Military career
- Allegiance: United States of America
- Branch: United States Army
- Service years: 1917–1943
- Rank: Brigadier General
- Commands: V Bomber Command; IV Bomber Command
- Conflicts: World War II: Battle of the Bismarck Sea
- Awards: Distinguished Service Cross; Distinguished Service Medal; Legion of Merit

Howard Knox Ramey (28 June 1896 – 26 March 1943) was a United States Army Air Forces general during World War II. Ramey learned to fly in 1918 during World War I and served as an instructor at the Air Corps Advanced Flying School and as a staff officer with the 1st Bombardment Wing between the wars. He was commander of the IV Bomber Command from 12 August 1942 to 8 November 1942, and was promoted to brigadier general on 17 September 1942. In November 1942, he became deputy commander of the Seventh Air Force in Hawaii. In January 1943, he became the commander of the V Bomber Command in Australia and Papua, which he led during the Battle of the Bismarck Sea. Later that March, he disappeared on a reconnaissance flight over the Torres Strait. Neither his aircraft nor his body has ever been found.

== Early life ==
Howard Knox Ramey was born in Waynesboro, Mississippi on 28 June 1896. He attended Mississippi Agricultural and Mechanical College from 1915 to 1917. In December 1917 he enlisted as a private first class in the Aviation Section, U.S. Signal Corps, in which he was commissioned as a second lieutenant on 20 April 1918.

== Between the wars ==
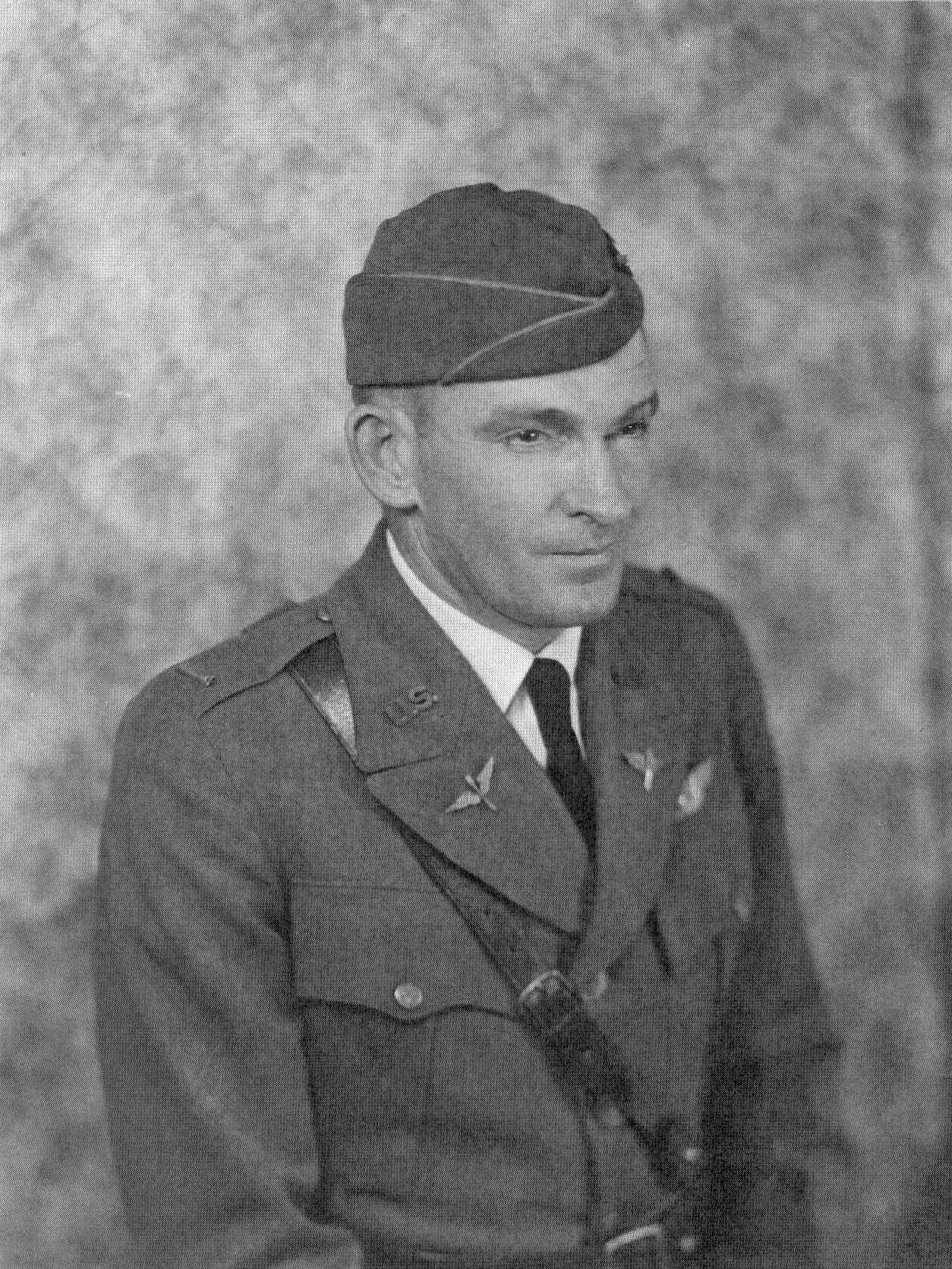
Lieutenant Howard Knox Ramey

In July 1920, Ramey received a permanent commission as a first lieutenant in the United States Army Air Service. He attended the Air Service Photography School in 1921, and became commander of the 6th Photo Section at Camp Nichols in the Philippines from January to October 1925. He then served as intelligence officer there until he returned to the United States in February 1927. He commanded the 22nd Photo Section at Kelly Field, San Antonio, Texas from 1927 to 1928, and was an instructor at the Air Corps Advanced Flying School there from 1928 to 1931.

After more than ten years as a first lieutenant, Ramey was finally promoted to captain on 1 March 1932. On 26 March 1934, Ramey was one of 35 American World War I military pilots who founded the Order of the Daedalians, a fraternal order of military pilots.

He attended the Air Corps Tactical School at Maxwell Field, Alabama, graduating in 1934, and then the Command and General Staff School at Fort Leavenworth, Kansas, graduating in 1936. Shortly afterwards, he was promoted to major on 16 June 1936. Ramey served as operations officer and assistant chief of staff for intelligence of the 1st Bombardment Wing at March Field, California from 1936 to 1941. He was promoted to lieutenant colonel on 30 December 1940.

== World War II ==
Ramey was deputy chief of staff for operations (G-3) of the Fourth Air Force from January to August 1942, with the rank of colonel from 5 January 1942. He was commander of the IV Bomber Command from 12 August 1942 to 8 November 1942, and was promoted to brigadier general on 17 September 1942. In November 1942, he became deputy commander of the Seventh Air Force.

Following the death of the commander of the V Bomber Command, Brigadier General Kenneth Walker, in an air raid over Rabaul in January 1943, the commander of the Fifth Air Force, Lieutenant General George Kenney asked Lieutenant General Henry H. Arnold, the chief of Army Air Forces to send Ramey to Australia as a replacement. The two men had known each other for years and Ramey had recently been on Kenney's staff when Kenney was commander of the Fourth Air Force. "I had a lot of confidence in him," Kenney later wrote, "and believed he would do a real job for me. Arnold replied the next day that I could have him." Ramey assumed command of V Bomber Command in January 1943. After the arguments over bombing tactics with Walker, Kenney was pleased that Ramey liked the skip bombing tactics the Fifth Air Force was developing. These tactics were put in practice with devastating effect at the Battle of the Bismarck Sea in March 1943.

== Death and legacy ==
On 26 March 1943, Ramey took off from Port Moresby in the B-17 Flying Fortress #41-24384, "Pluto", to carry out a scheduled seven-hour reconnaissance flight to Merauke and Horn Island. A message from the radio operator twenty minutes after take-off was the last that was ever heard from the aircraft. An extensive air search was conducted but no sign was found of the aircraft or the twelve men on board. Ramey was declared dead on 19 November 1945. He left behind a wife and two daughters. Ramey Air Force Base in Puerto Rico was named in his honour.

In February 2007, diver Ben Cropp reported that he had found the wreckage of the plane. However, the plane turned out to have been a misidentified C-47. The location of the wreck of "Pluto" remains unknown.
