= Bayug Airfield =

World War II airfield in Philippines

Bayug Airfield
- Part of Fifth Air Force
- Bayug Airfield (Philippines)

Site information
- Type: Military Airfield
- Controlled by: United States Army Air Forces

Location
- Coordinates: 10°59′05.41″N 124°54′41.31″E

Site history
- Built: 1943
- In use: 1943-1945

Bayug Airfield is a World War II airfield located in the east of Burauen, Leyte, Philippines, and to the west of San Pablo Airfield, to the north of the Marabong River in the province of Leyte, Philippines. It was closed after the war.

== History ==
Bayung (Bayug) was built by the Japanese during the occupation in 1943. The airfield was a single runway with a set of revetments, and taxiways in a V shape out from the main runway. It was seized by the Americans in November 1944 after the Leyte landing and turned into a command and control base, as well as an operational airfield housing reconnaissance units. With the end of the war, the base was closed and today the airfield has returned to its natural state.

Units assigned to Bayug airfield were:

- Headquarters, Fifth Air Force (20 November 1944-January 1945)
- Headquarters, V Bomber Command (November 1944-January 1945)
- Headquarters, V Fighter Command (November 1944-January 1945)
- Headquarters, 308th Bombardment Wing (22 October 1944 – 11 January 1945)
- Headquarters, 310th Bombardment Wing (14 November-15 December 1944)
- Headquarters, 85th Fighter Wing, (June 11945-July 1946)
- Headquarters, 91st Reconnaissance Wing (12 November 1944 – 28 January 1945)
- Headquarters, 54th Troop Carrier Wing (14 February–June 1945)
- 6th Reconnaissance Group (3 November 1944 – 1 May 1945)
- 71st Reconnaissance Group (5 November 1944 – 5 February 1945)

== See also ==
- USAAF in the Southwest Pacific
