= 6th Air Intelligence Squadron =

6th Air Intelligence Squadron
- Active: 1943–1947, 1981–1993
- Country: United States
- Branch: United States Air Force
- Role: Intelligence
- Part of: Pacific Air Forces
- Motto(s): Truly Ready (1982–1993)

Insignia
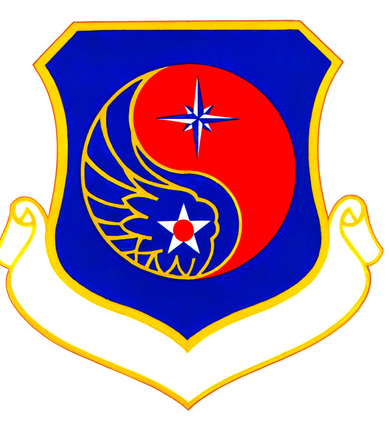
- 6th Tactical Intelligence Group emblem (approved 30 June 1982)

The 6th Air Intelligence Squadron is an inactive unit of the United States Air Force. Its last assignment was with Seventh Air Force, stationed at Osan Air Base, Korea. It was inactivated in 1993. The unit was originally established at Army Air Base, Colorado Springs, Colorado (later Peterson Air Force Base) as the 6th Photographic Group on 5 February 1943, under the command of Lt Waymond Davis. Later that year, the unit was redesignated the 6th Reconnaissance Group and deployed to the southwest Pacific as a component of the Fifth Air Force.

== History ==
=== World War II ===
The squadron was first activated in February 1943 at Army Air Base, Colorado Springs, Colorado, with the 25th, 26th and 27th Photographic Reconnaissance Squadrons assigned as its original components. The group trained at Colorado Springs until September 1943, when it began moving to the Southwest Pacific Theater

During World War II, the group operated primarily in the Southwest Pacific Theater and used Lockheed F-5 Lightnings and Consolidated F-7 Liberators to photograph Japanese airfields, harbors, beach defenses, and personnel areas in New Guinea, the Bismarcks, Borneo, and the southern Philippines. It reconnoitered target areas and enemy troop positions to provide intelligence for air force and army units. T\In 1944, the group was awarded the Distinguished Unit Citation and the Philippine Presidential Unit Citation for carrying out one of the most important and difficult assignments ever given to a photographic unit: to obtain 80,000 prints of Japanese defenses in the Philippines in eight days. The group's F-5s and F-7s risked enemy interception and braved severe tropical weather to complete their mission all without fighter escort. The action proved critical to the successful amphibious assault of the Philippines.

After moving to the Philippines in November 1944, flew missions to Formosa and China, engaged in mapping parts of Luzon and Mindanao], and provided intelligence for US ground forces concerning Japanese movements. The unit then moved to Okinawa until the war ended, and finally to mainland Japan, where it was inactivated on 27 April 1946. It was disbanded on 6 March 1947.

=== Intelligence operations ===
On 1 October 1981, the unit was reconstituted and reactivated as the 6th Tactical Intelligence Group at Osan Air Base, Republic of Korea. It was tasked to provide substantive Intelligence support to U.S. and Combined Forces Combat. The 6th Group thus brought together intelligence collection, analysis, targeting, production, and dissemination assets assigned to the 314th Air Division of Fifth Air Force and the Korean Tactical Air Control System. In February 1992, the group became part of the 51st Fighter Wing. In 1992 The group became a squadron and was transferred to the 5th Air Control Group. Later that same year the 6th Air Intelligence Squadron fell under operational control of Seventh Air Force when it replaced the 314th Air Division as the United States Air Force headquarters for Korea.

== Lineage ==
- Constituted as 6th Photographic Group on 5 February 1943

Activated on 9 February 1943
Redesignated: 6th Photographic Reconnaissance and Mapping Group c. 15 May 1943
Redesignated: 6th Photographic Reconnaissance Group on 11 August 1943
Redesignated: 6th Reconnaissance Group c. 4 May 1945
Inactivated on 27 April 1946
Disbanded on 6 March 1947
Reconstituted 31 August 1981 and redesignated 6th Tactical Intelligence Group

- Activated on 1 October 1981

Redesignated 6th Air Intelligence Squadron on 7 February 1992
Inactivated on 1 October 1993

=== Assignments ===
- Second Air Force, 9 February–September 1943
- V Bomber Command, 10 October 1943
- 5212th Reconnaissance Wing (Provisional), 1 March 1944
- 91st Reconnaissance Wing, 12 April 1944
- Fifth Air Force, 10 November 1945 – 27 April 1946
- 314th Air Division, 1 October 1991
- Seventh Air Force, 1 September 1986 – 6 February 1992
- 5th Air Control Group, subordinate to 51st Fighter Wing, 7 February 1992 – 1 October 1993

=== Stations ===
Headquarters and Ground Echelon:

- Army Air Base Colorado Springs, Colorado, 9 February–September 1943
- Sydney Airport, Australia, 10 October 1943
- Archerfield Airport (Brisbane), Australia, 27 November 1943
- Wards Airfield (5 Mile Drome), Port Moresby, New Guinea, 10 December 1943
- Nadzab Airfield, New Guinea, 17 February 1944
- Mokmer Airfield, Biak, Netherlands East Indies, August 1944
- Bayug Airfield, Leyte, Philippines, 3 November 1944
- Clark Field, Luzon, Philippines, 1 May 1945
- Okinawa, 31 July 1945
- Chofu Airfield, Japan, 27 September 1945
- Irumagawa Air Base, Japan, January-27 April 1946
- Osan Air Base, Korea, 1 October 1981 – 1 October 1993

(Air Echelon deployed at stations throughout Southwest Pacific)

=== Units assigned ===
- 8th Photographic Reconnaissance Squadron: 13 November 1943 – 27 April 1946 (attached to V Bomber Command after 10 December 1945)

Aircraft: P-38 (F-4/F-5), 1943–1946; B-26 (F-6), 1943–1944

- 20th Photographic Squadron (later 20th Combat Mapping Squadron, 20th Reconnaissance Squadron): attached 17 June 1943, assigned 5 December 1943 – 10 November 1945

Aircraft: B-24 (F-7), 1943–1946

- 25th Photographic Squadron (later 25th Photographic Reconnaissance Squadron, 25th Tactical Reconnaissance Squadron: 9 February 1943 – 27 April 1946 (attached to V Fighter Command after 10 February 1946)

Aircraft: P-38 (F-5), 1943–1945; B-25, 1944

- 26th Reconnaissance Squadron (later 26th Photographic Reconnaissance Squadron): 9 February 1943 – 21 November 1945 (attached to 308th Bombardment Wing after 22 October 1945)

Aircraft: P-38 (F-4), 1943 P-38 (F-5), 1944–1945

- 27th Reconnaissance Squadron (later 26th Photographic Reconnaissance Squadron): 9 February-9 October 1943

Aircraft: P-38 (F-4), 1943

- 36th Photographic Mapping Squadron (later 36th Photographic Reconnaissance Squadron): 23 December 1944 – 20 October 1945

Aircraft: P-38 (F-4), 1944–1945

== See also ==
- United States Army Air Forces in Australia
