= 91st Air Division =

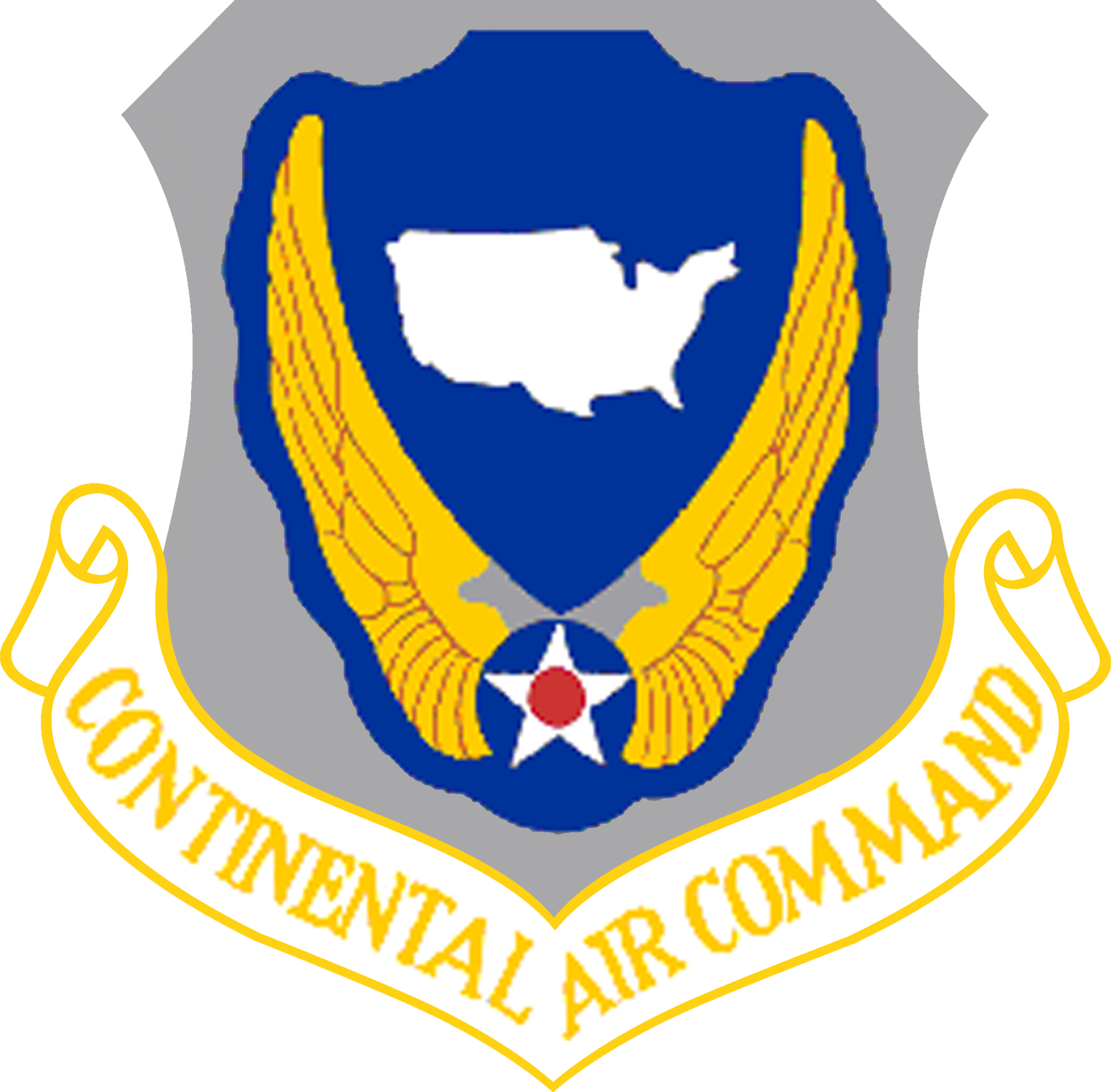
91st Air Division
- Active: 1943–1946; 1946–1949
- Country: United States
- Branch: United States Air Force
- Role: Command of reconnaissance forces
- Part of: Continental Air Command
- Engagements: Southwest Pacific Theater
- Decorations: Philippine Presidential Unit Citation

The 91st Air Division is an inactive United States Air Force organization. Its last assignment was with Continental Air Forces, assigned to First Air Force, being stationed at Newark Municipal Airport, New Jersey. It was inactivated on 24 June 1949.

== History ==
During World War II, the 91st Photographic Wing was the primary source of aerial photography and visual intelligence and mapping for Fifth Air Force in the Southwest Pacific theater. Its assigned units flying unarmed over enemy territory, "photographing Japanese airfields, harbors, beach defenses, and personnel areas in New Guinea, the Bismarcks, Borneo, and the southern Philippines. They also reconnoitered target areas and enemy troop positions to provide intelligence for Air Force and Army units."

"Liaison aircraft assigned to the wing rescued Allied fliers forced down in Pacific jungles, and evacuated wounded personnel from forward areas. Frequently fighters, assigned to subordinate units, attacked gun emplacements, bridges, supply dumps, and other installations in support of ground troops."

"In 1945, as the war with Japan came to a close, the subordinate units flew photographic missions over Kyūshū. After hostilities ceased, these flights continued, and the aerial photographs obtained helped to locate prisoner of war (POW) camps and in assessing damage done to the Japanese communications system." Inactivated in Japan during early 1946.

"Activated as part of the Air Force Reserve at Newark Airport, New Jersey in late 1946 controlling tactical reconnaissance units. The organization was redesignated as an Air Division in April 1948 as part of the realignment of the United States Air Force command echelon structure. It was primarily an administrative organization. It inactivated in 1949."

=== Lineage ===
- Established as the 91 Photographic Wing, Reconnaissance on 9 October 1943

Activated on 20 October 1943
Redesignated 91 Reconnaissance Wing on 20 June 1945.
Inactivated on 27 January 1946

- Activated in the Reserve on 20 December 1946

Redesignated 91 Air Division, Reconnaissance on 16 April 1948
Inactivated on 27 June 1949

=== Assignments ===
- Third Air Force, 20 October 1943 – 20 February 1944
- Army Service Forces, Port of Embarkation, 20 February – 30 March 1944
- Fifth Air Force, 30 March 1944
- Far East Air Forces (later, Pacific Air Command, U.S. Army), 8 August 1944 – 27 January 1946
- First Air Force, 20 December 1946 – 27 January 1949

=== Stations ===
- Will Rogers Field, Oklahoma, 20 October 1943
- Birmingham Army Air Base, Alabama, 9 November 1943 – 20 February 1944
- Nadzab Airfield, New Guinea, 30 March 1944
- Mokmer Airfield, Biak Island, Netherlands East Indies, 10 August 1944
- Bayug Airfield, Leyte, Philippines, 12 November 1944
- McGuire Field, Mindoro, Philippines, 28 January 1945
- Clark Field, Luzon, Philippines, 24 March 1945
- Okinawa, 30 July 1945
- Honshu, Japan, 5 October 1945 – 27 January 1946
- Newark Army Air Base (later Newark Municipal Airport), New Jersey, 20 December 1946 – 27 June 1949

=== Components ===
Groups

- 6th Reconnaissance Group: 12 April 1944 – 10 November 1945
- 66th Reconnaissance Group: 27 December 1946 – 27 June 1949
- 71st Reconnaissance Group: 1 May 1944 – 10 November 1945
- 74th Reconnaissance Group: 27 December 1946 – 27 June 1949.

Squadrons

- 17th Reconnaissance Squadron: attached c. 21 October – 10 November 1945
- 20th Reconnaissance Squadron: 10 November – 1 December 1945
- 25th Liaison Squadron: 15 April 1944 – 16 February 1945

=== Aircraft ===
- North American B-25 Mitchell, 1944–1945
- Martin B-26 Marauder, 1944
- Lockheed F-4 Lightning, 1944
- Lockheed F-5 Lightning, 1944–1945
- Stinson L-5 Sentinel, 1944–1945
- Cessna UC-78 Bobcat, 1944–1945
- Consolidated B-24 Liberator, 1945
- Douglas C-47 Skytrain, 1945

== Bibliography ==
- Maurer, Maurer, ed. (1983) [1961]. Air Force Combat Units of World War II (PDF) (reprint ed.). Washington, DC: Office of Air Force History. ISBN 0-912799-02-1. LCCN 61060979. Archived from the original (PDF) on 20 December 2016.
