= V Bomber Command =

- Active: 1941–1946
- Country: United States
- Branch: United States Air Force
- Type: Command of tactical aviation
- Engagements: Southwest Pacific Theater
- Decorations: Distinguished Unit Citation; Philippine Presidential Unit Citation

Commanders
- Notable commanders: Brig. Gen. Kenneth Walker (KIA); Brig. Gen. Howard K. Ramey (MIA)

The V Bomber Command is an inactive United States Army Air Forces unit. It was last assigned to Fifth Air Force, based at Irumagawa AB, Japan. It was inactivated on 31 May 1946.

During World War II the unit initially controlled Fifth Air Force bomber units in the Philippines. It was largely destroyed in the Battle of the Philippines, and withdrew to Australia at the end of December 1941, although elements of some units remained in the Philippines until April 1942. Re-equipped, the command provided command and control authority of Army Air Force bombardment organizations within the Fifth Air Force Area of Responsibility (AOR).

Afterward, the unit served with the occupation force in Japan before being inactivated in 1946.

== History ==
Participated in the defense of the Philippines in December 1941. Late in December the remaining bombers and some men were evacuated to Australia, and in January 1942 they were moved to Java to help delay the Japanese advance in the Netherlands Indies.

The command ceased to function in March 1942 (the AAF bombardment organizations in the Southwest Pacific being under the control of American-British-Dutch-Australian Command (ABDA) and later Allied Air Forces). Headquarters was remanned in September 1942 and shortly afterward it assumed control of AAF bombardment groups in Australia and New Guinea.

The command served in combat with Fifth Air Force until the end of the war. Brigadier General Kenneth N. Walker, who was killed during a mission over Rabaul on 5 January 1943, was awarded the Medal of Honor; he had repeatedly taken part in combat missions and had developed an effective technique for bombing when opposed by enemy interceptors and antiaircraft fire. After the war the command became part of the occupation force for Japan. Inactivated on 31 May 1946. Disbanded on 8 October 1948.

== Lineage ==
- Constituted as the 5th Bomber Command on 28 October 1941 (Note: Maurer indicates that the unit was constituted as the "V" Bomber Command. However, the unit was constituted and activated with an arabic number in its name. The use of roman numerals to designate Army Air Forces combat commands did not begin until September 1942. "Air Force Historical Research Agency Organizational Reconds: Types of USAF Organizations". Air Force History Index. 9 January 2008.)

Activated on 14 November 1941

- Redesignated V Bomber Command c. 18 September 1942

Inactivated on 31 May 1946
Disbanded on 8 October 1948

=== Assignments ===
- Fifth Air Force, 14 November 1941 – 31 May 1946

=== Stations ===
- Clark Field, Luzon, Philippines, 14 November 1941
- RAAF Base Darwin, Australia, December 1941
- Java, January–March 1942
- RAAF Base Townsville, Australia, 5 September 1942
- Jackson Airfield, Port Moresby, New Guinea, December 1942
- Nadzab Airfield, New Guinea, 21 February 1944
- Owi Airfield, Schouten Islands, Netherlands East Indies, c. 15 August 1944
- Bayug Airfield, Leyte, Philippines, November 1944
- McGuire Field, Mindoro, Philippines, January 1945
- Clark Field, Luzon, Philippines, March 1945
- Hamasaki (Motobu Airfield), Okinawa, August 1945
- Murayama, Japan, October 1945
- Irumagawa AB, Japan, c. 15 January – 31 May 1946

=== Units ===
Wings

- 314th Bombardment Wing: 30 May 1946 – 31 May 1946

Groups

- 3d Bombardment Group: 5 September 1942 – 31 May 1946
- 6th Reconnaissance Group: 10 October 1943 – 1 March 1944
- 19th Bombardment Group: 16 November 1941 – March 1942; September 1942 – 9 December 1942
- 22d Bombardment Group: 5 September 1942 – November 1945 (attached to 309th Bombardment Wing, 1–16 February 1944)
- 27th Bombardment Group: c. 20 November 1941 – 4 May 1942 (under operational control of American-British-Dutch-Australian Command after c. March 1942)
- 35th Fighter Group: 10 November 1945 – 25 May 1946
- 38th Bombardment Group*: 18 January – 1 August 1942
- 43d Bombardment Group: 5 September 1942 – 3 December 1945
- 49th Fighter Group: 10 November 1945 – 1 June 1946
- 71st Reconnaissance Group*: November 1943-1 March 1944
- 90th Bombardment Group: November 1942 – 23 November 1945
- 312th Bombardment Group: 16 January 1944 – 18 October 1945
- 345th Bombardment Group*: 5 June 1943 – 10 December 1945
- 380th Bombardment Group*: May 1943-20 February 1946
- 417th Bombardment Group*: 28 January 1944 – 1 November 1945
- 494th Bombardment Group: operational control 15 December 1944 – 28 January 1945

*Note; Does not include periods detached to combat wings

Squadrons

- 2d Emergency Rescue Squadron, 5 September – 7 October 1944
- 3d Emergency Rescue Squadron: operational control 26 August – 2 October 1944; assigned 21 November 1945 − 31 May 1946
- 8th Photographic Squadron (later 8th Photographic Reconnaissance Squadron): assigned 5 September 1942 – 13 November 1943; attached c. 10 December 1945, assigned c 27 April 1946 – 31 May 1946
- 20th Reconnaissance Squadron: 1 December 1945 – 31 May 1946
- 25th Liaison Squadron: 24 November – 13 December 1943
- 82d Tactical Reconnaissance Squadron: 1 February – 31 May 1946
- 157th Liaison Squadron: attached 25 November 1945, assigned 25 March – 1 June 1946
- 418th Night Fighter Squadron: attached 10 November 1945 – 20 March 1946
- 547th Night Fighter Squadron: attached 10 November 1945 – 20 February 1946

== See also ==
- United States Army Air Forces in Australia (World War II)
