= 314th Air Division =

Inactive US Air Force unit

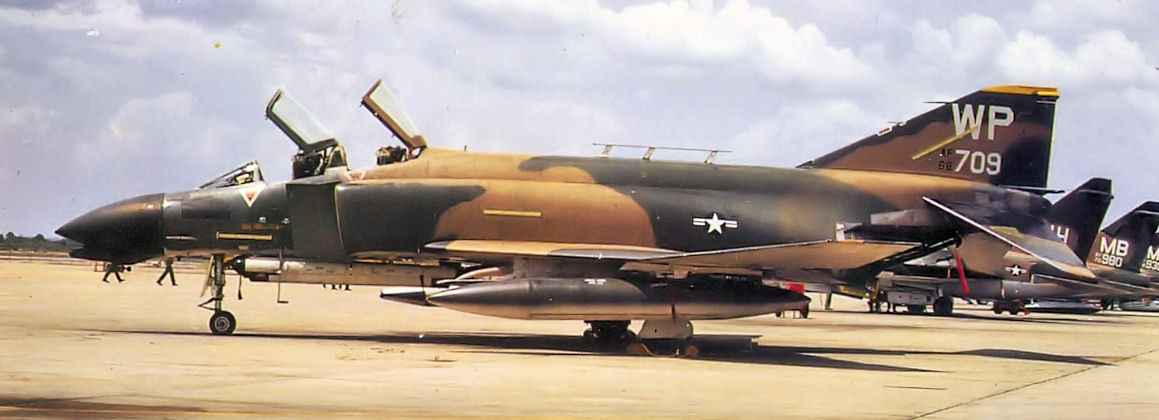
- F-4D Phantom of the 8th Tactical Fighter Wing, 1973 (Note: Aircraft is McDonnell F-4D-32-MC Phantom, serial 66-8709. This plane was sent to the Aerospace Maintenance and Regeneration Center on 6 October 1988 and to the Avon Park Air Force Range for use as a target on 26 August 1998. Baugher, Joe (18 July 2023). "1966 USAF Serial Numbers". Joe Baugher.)
- Active: 1944–1952; 1955–1986
- Country: United States
- Branch: United States Air Force
- Role: Command of tactical air forces
- Motto: Destructio ab Alto (Latin for 'Destruction from Above')
- Engagements: Pacific Theater of Operations
- Decorations: Air Force Outstanding Unit Award; Republic of Korea Presidential Unit Citation

Insignia
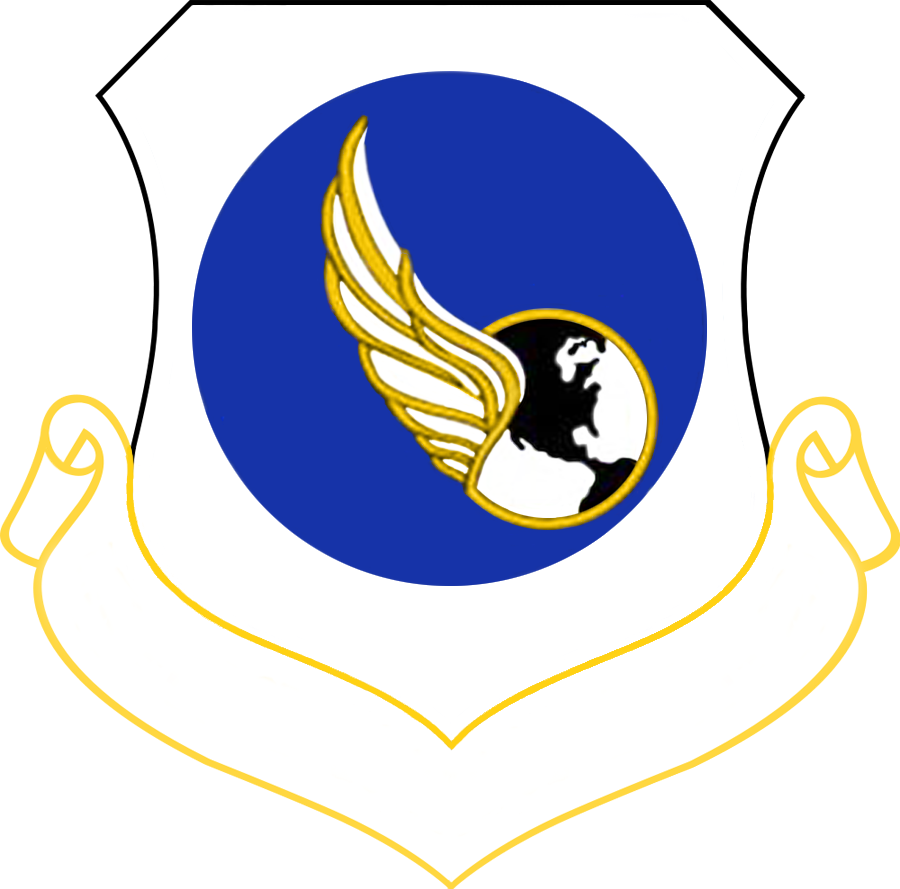
- 314th Air Division emblem (Note: Approved 9 May 1956. Description: On a shield argent a roundle [sic] azure, charged with a sphere of the field['s color], land areas sable edged or; a demi wing superimposed over the dexter area of the sphere of the first [color mentioned], highlighted or.)

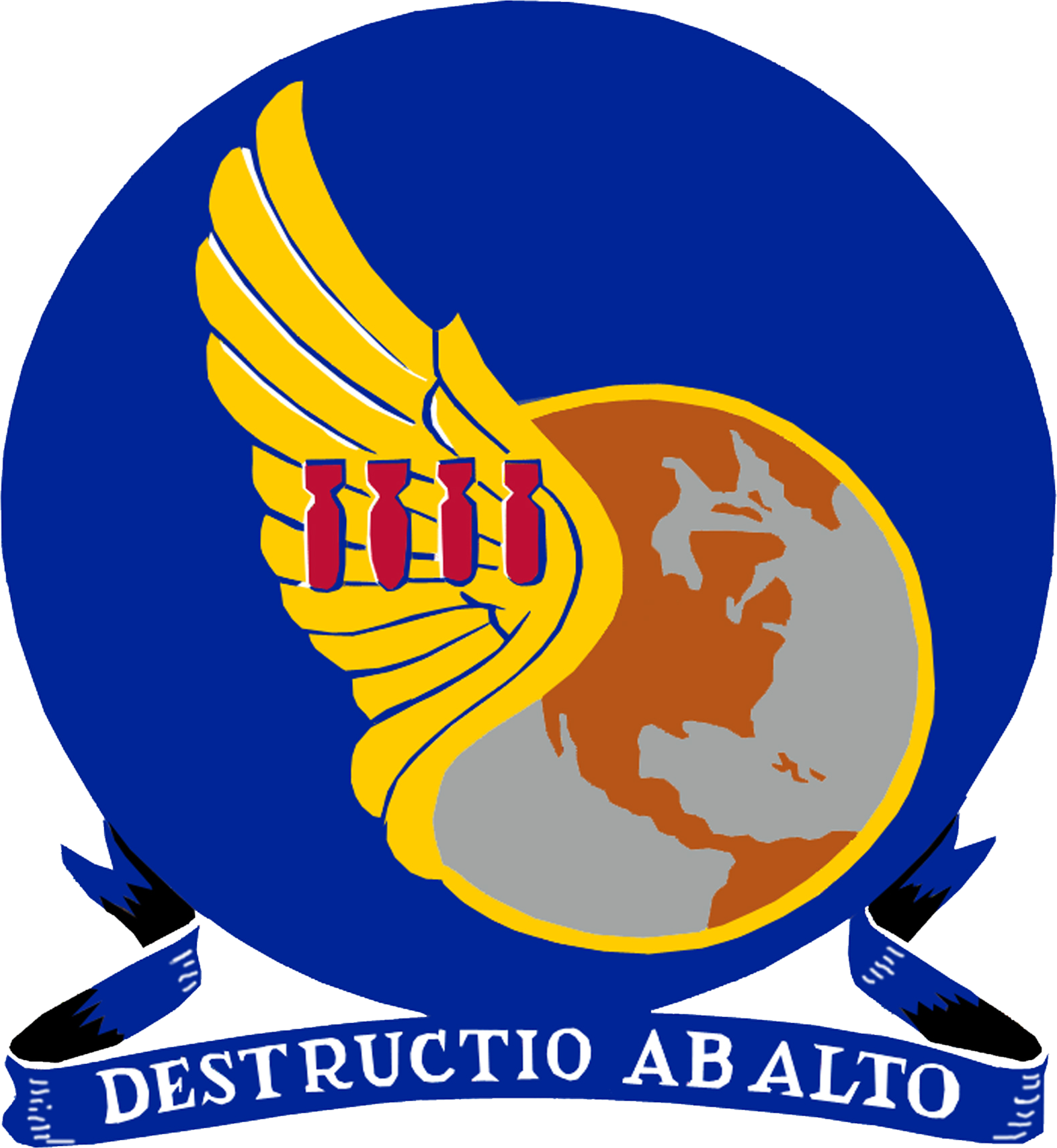
- 314th Bombardment Wing emblem (Note: Approved 20 January 1945. Description: on an ultramarine blue disc, in sinister base, a globe, proper, with silver water areas and brown land areas, fimbriated gold winged at dexter by a stylized wing of the last [color mentioned], charged with four aerial bombs gules, palewise, points to base.)

The 314th Air Division is an inactive United States Air Force unit. Its last assignment was with Pacific Air Forces at Osan Air Base, South Korea, where it was inactivated in September 1986.

The unit was first organized during World War II as the 314th Bombardment Wing, which was part of the Twentieth Air Force of the United States Army Air Forces. The 314th engaged in bombing operations against Japan using Boeing B-29 Superfortresses.

== History ==
=== World War II ===
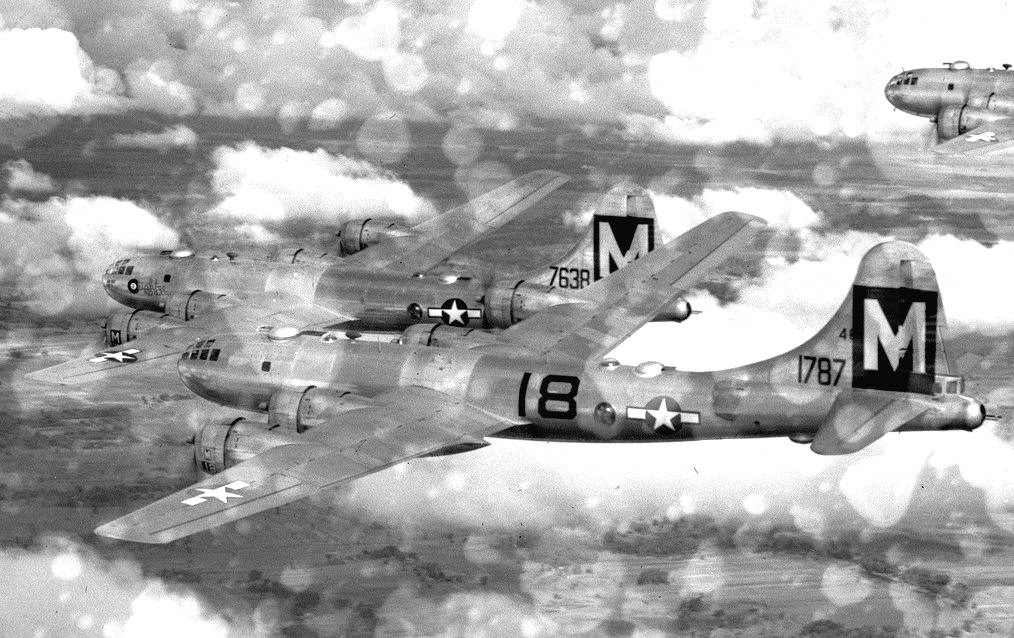
19th Bombardment Group B-29 Superfortresses 1945

The 314th Bombardment Wing was activated in July 1944 at Peterson Field, Colorado as a command organization for four Boeing B-29 Superfortress bombardment groups. The unit trained in Colorado while subordinate groups were trained in Kansas by the Second Air Force.

When training was completed the 314th moved to Guam in the Mariana Islands of the Central Pacific Area in January 1945 The 314th was the fourth B-29 wing assigned to XXI Bomber Command, Twentieth Air Force. Its mission was the strategic bombardment of the Japanese Home Islands and the destruction of its war-making capability. In the Marianas, the Wing commanded the 19th, 29th 39th and 330th Bombardment Groups. The 19th and 29th arrived in January; the 39th and 330th in February.

Its groups flew "shakedown" missions against Japanese targets on Moen Island, Truk, and other points in the Carolines and Marianas. The 19th began combat missions over Japan on 25 February 1945 with a firebombing mission over Northeast Tokyo; the 29th with a firebombing mission over central Tokyo on 9 March. The 39th's first mission was an attack of the Hodagaya Chemical Works in Koriyama on 15 April; the 330th hitting the same three days earlier on 12 April. The Division continued attacking urban areas until the end of the war in August 1945; its subordinate units conducted raids against strategic objectives, bombing aircraft factories; chemical plants; oil refineries; and other targets in Japan. The wing flew its last combat missions on 14 August when hostilities ended. Afterwards, the wing's B-29s carried relief supplies to Allied prisoner of war camps in Japan and Manchuria.

The 330th Bomb Group was relieved from assignment on 21 November, its personnel and equipment returning to the United States; the 39th in December. The other groups returned in May 1946. The Wing then moved to Johnson Army Air Base, Japan in mid-May 1946 to become part of the Fifth Air Force Occupation forces.

With the postwar consolidation of units, the organization was redesignated 314th Composite Wing in 1946, having both groups and squadrons of varying missions assigned to the wing. For approximately two years (1946–1948) the 314th served as one of Fifth Air Force's major components. "It maintained intensive training schedules, participated in training exercises and took part in the post-hostilities program of mapping Japan."

=== Korean War ===
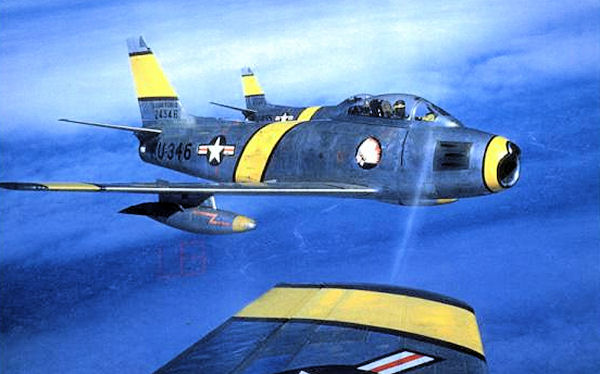
F-86s of the 4th Fighter-interceptor Wing 1951

Activated at Nagoya AB, Japan, on 1 December 1950 as the 314th Air Division, the organization immediately assumed the missions of the air defense of Japan, logistical support for Fifth Air Force during the Korean War, and airfield construction in Japan. Units under the Division's direct jurisdiction during the Korean War were the following:

- 4th Fighter-Interceptor Wing, F-86 Sabre (Air Defense)
- 374th Troop Carrier Wing, C-46 Commando; C-47 Skytrain (Airlift)
- 437th Troop Carrier Wing, C-46 Commando (Airlift)
- 452d Bombardment Wing, B-26 Invader (Tactical bombing in Korea)
- 41st Fighter-Interceptor Squadron, F-80 Shooting Star (Air Defense)
- 91st Strategic Reconnaissance Squadron, RB-45, RB-29, RB-50 (Strategic Reconnaissance)

On 1 March 1952 the 314th Air Division stood down, as part of a Far East Air Force reorganization. Its units were reassigned to other organizations.

=== Cold War ===
Reactivated in March 1955 at Osan Air Base, South Korea, the 314th Air Division was the primary command organization in South Korea for the next 30 years. "The division maintained assigned and attached forces at a high degree of combat readiness during the Cold War. In fulfilling its mission, the division supported numerous military exercises in the region, such as Commando Bearcat, Commando Jade, and Commando Night."

The Division was inactivated in 1986 and was replaced by the reactivated Seventh Air Force, which assumed all of its assigned assets.

== Lineage ==
314th Air Division

- Established as the 314th Bombardment Wing, Very Heavy on 15 April 1944.

Activated on 23 April 1944
Redesignated 314th Composite Wing on 15 April 1946
Inactivated on 20 August 1948

- Redesignated 314th Air Division on 21 November 1950

Activated on 1 December 1950
Inactivated on 1 March 1952

- Activated on 15 March 1955

Consolidated with Table of Distribution 314th Air Division on 1 July 1978
Inactivated on 8 September 1986

Table of Distribution 314th Air Division

- Established as the 314th Air Division on 13 August 1948

Organized on 18 August 1948
Discontinued on 1 March 1950
Consolidated with 314th Air Division on 1 July 1978

=== Assignments ===
- Second Air Force, 23 April 1944
- XXI Bomber Command, 8 June 1944
- Twentieth Air Force, 16 July 1945
- Fifth Air Force, 15 May 1946
- V Bomber Command, 30 May 1946
- Fifth Air Force, 31 May 1946 – 1 March 1950
- Fifth Air Force, 1 December 1950
- Far East Air Forces, 18 May 1951 – 1 March 1952
- Fifth Air Force, 15 March 1955 – 8 September 1986

=== Units assigned ===
==== World War II ====
- 19th Bombardment Group: c. 9 December 1944 – 15 May 1946
- 29th Bombardment Group: c. 9 November 1944 – 15 May 1946 (not operational after, 12 February 1946)

31st Air Service Group: c. 9 December 1944 – 15 May 1946

- 39th Bombardment Group: 18 February-27 December 1945

69th Air Service Group: c. 9 November 1944 – 15 May 1946
89th Air Service Group: 18 February-27 December 1945
90th Air Service Group: c. 9 Nov 1944-c. 21 November 1945

- 330th Bombardment Group: c. 9 Nov 1944-c. 21 November 1945

==== United States Air Force ====
Wings

- 3d Bombardment Wing (later 3d Tactical Fighter Wing): 18 August 1948 – 1 March 1950, 15 March 1971 – 16 September 1974
- 4th Fighter-Interceptor Wing: attached 22 December 1950 – 7 May 1951
- 8th Tactical Fighter Wing: 16 September 1974 – 8 September 1986
- 18th Fighter-Bomber Wing: 1 March 1955 – 31 January 1957
- 35th Fighter Wing (later 35th Fighter-Interceptor Wing): 18 August 1948 – 1 March 1950, 25 May 1951 – 1 March 1952
- 49th Fighter Wing (later 49th Fighter-Bomber Wing): 18 August 1948 – 1 March 1950
- 51st Fighter Wing (later 51st Composite Wing, 51st Tactical Fighter Wing): 1 November 1971 – 8 September 1986
- 58th Fighter-Bomber Wing: attached 15 March 1955 – 31 December 1956, assigned 1 January 1957 – 1 July 1958
- 116th Fighter-Bomber Wing: 24 July 1951 – 1 March 1952
- 374th Troop Carrier Wing: 1 December 1950 – 25 January 1951 (detached entire period)
- 437th Troop Carrier Wing: 1 December 1950 – 25 January 1951 (detached entire period)
- 452d Bombardment Wing: 1 December 1950 – 25 May 1951
- 6013th Operations Wing (Northern Area): 2 November 1951 – 1 March 1952
- 6014th Operations Wing (Central Area): 2 November 1951 – 1 March 1952
- 6015th Operations Wing (Southern Area): 2 November 1951 – 1 March 1952

Groups

- 3d Bombardment Group: 31 May 1946 – 18 August 1948
- 35th Fighter Group: 31 May 1946 – 18 August 1948
- 58th Tactical Missile Group: 24 April 1959 – 25 March 1962
- 71st Reconnaissance Group: 15 April 1947 – 18 August 1948 (not operational after 15 April 1947, detached after 31 October 1947)
- 6146th Air Force Advisory Group (Republic of Korea Air Force) (later 6146th Flying Training Group, 6146th Air Force Advisory Group): 15 March – 24 September 1955, 18 September 1956 – 1 April 1971

Squadrons

- 6th Night Fighter Squadron: 10 June 1946 – 20 February 1947 (detached after 7 September 1946)
- 8th Photographic Reconnaissance Squadron (later 8th Tactical Reconnaissance Squadron): Assigned 31 May 1946 – 28 February 1947 (not operational 31 May – 16 December 1946, detached 16 September – 16 December 1946), attached 28 February – c. 31 October 1947, attached 18 April 1949 – 1 March 1950
- 9th Reconnaissance Squadron: 20 June 1946 – 20 October 1947 (detached after 25 September 1946)
- 19th Tactical Air Support Squadron: 15 January 1972 – 30 September 1974
- 20th Reconnaissance Squadron: 31 May – 20 June 1946
- 41st Fighter-Interceptor Squadron: attached 1 December 1950 – 25 May 1951
- 56th Strategic Reconnaissance Squadron: attached 18 May 1951 – 1 March 1952
- 63d Bombardment Squadron: attached 1–29 September 1947
- 65th Bombardment Squadron: 1–29 January 1947
- 68th Fighter Squadron (later 68th Fighter-Interceptor Squadron): 1 December 1950 – 1 March 1952 (detached entire period)
- 82d Tactical Reconnaissance Squadron (later 82d Reconnaissance Squadron): 31 May 1946 – 28 February 1947; attached 28 February – November 1947
- 91st Strategic Reconnaissance Squadron: attached 18 May 1951 – 1 March 1952
- 157th Liaison Squadron: 31 May – 1 June 1946
- 310th Fighter-Bomber Squadron: 1–15 July 1958 (not operational)
- 334th Fighter-Interceptor Squadron: attached 7 May – 27 June 1951
- 335th Fighter-Interceptor Squadron: attached 20 September – 4 November 1951
- 336th Fighter-Interceptor Squadron: attached 27 June – 20 September 1951
- 339th Fighter Squadron (later, 339th Fighter-Interceptor Squadron): attached 15 December 1946 – 20 February 1947 (not operational); 20 February 1947 – 18 August 1948; assigned 1 December 1950 – 1 March 1952 (detached entire period)
- 342d Bombardment Squadron: attached 1 – 28 August 1947
- 431st Fighter Squadron: attached 1 March – unknown 1947
- 436th Bombardment Squadron: attached 1 – 30 May 1947
- 492d Bombardment Squadron: attached 2–30 July 1947
- 6156th Flying Training Squadron (Trans ROKAF): 15 March – 14 September 1955

=== Stations ===
- Peterson Field, Colorado, 23 April – 9 December 1944
- North Field, Mariana Islands, 16 January 1945 – 15 May 1946
- Johnson Army Air Base (later Johnson Air Force Base, Johnson Air Base), Japan, 15 May 1946 – 1 March 1950
- Nagoya Air Base, Japan, 1 December 1950 – 1 March 1952
- Osan Ni Air Base (later Osan Air Base), South Korea, 15 March 1955 – 7 November 1978, 1 April 1979 – 8 September 1986.
- Yong San, South Korea, 7 November 1978 – 1 April 1979

== See also ==
- List of United States Air Force air divisions
