= Frans Kaisiepo Airport =

Airport in Biak, Papua, Indonesia

Frans Kaisiepo International Airport Bandar Udara Internasional Frans Kaisiepo
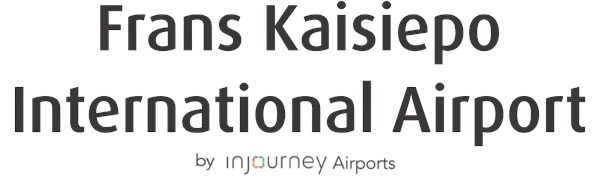

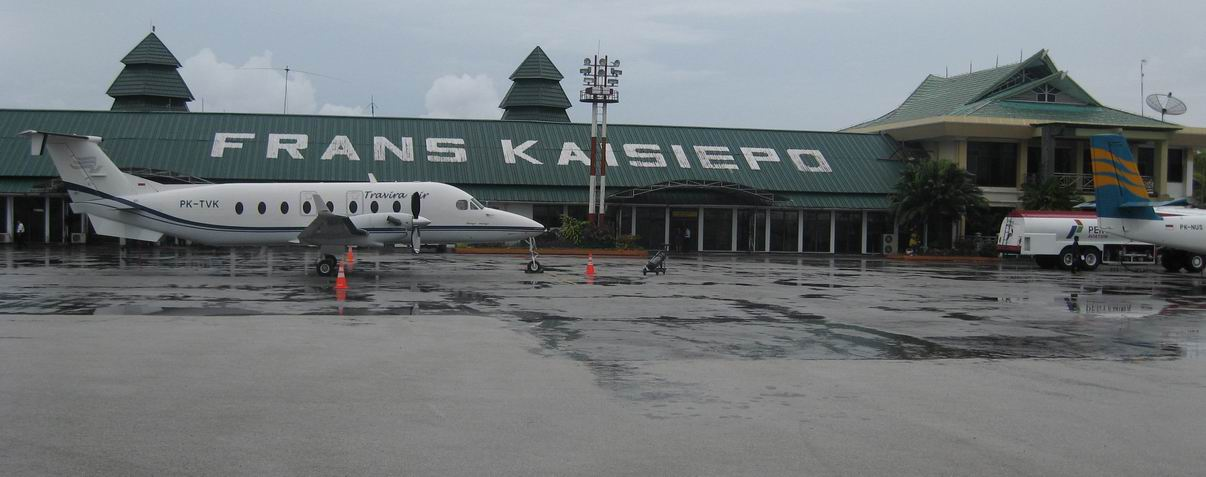
- IATA: BIK; ICAO: WABB

Summary
- Airport type: Public / Military
- Owner: Government of Indonesia
- Operator: InJourney Airports
- Serves: Biak and the surrounding areas of Yendidori, Adoki, Mandon and Saba
- Location: Biak, Biak Numfor Regency, Papua, Indonesia
- Time zone: WIT (UTC+09:00)
- Elevation AMSL: 14 m (46 ft)
- Coordinates: 01°11′24″S 136°06′27″E

Map
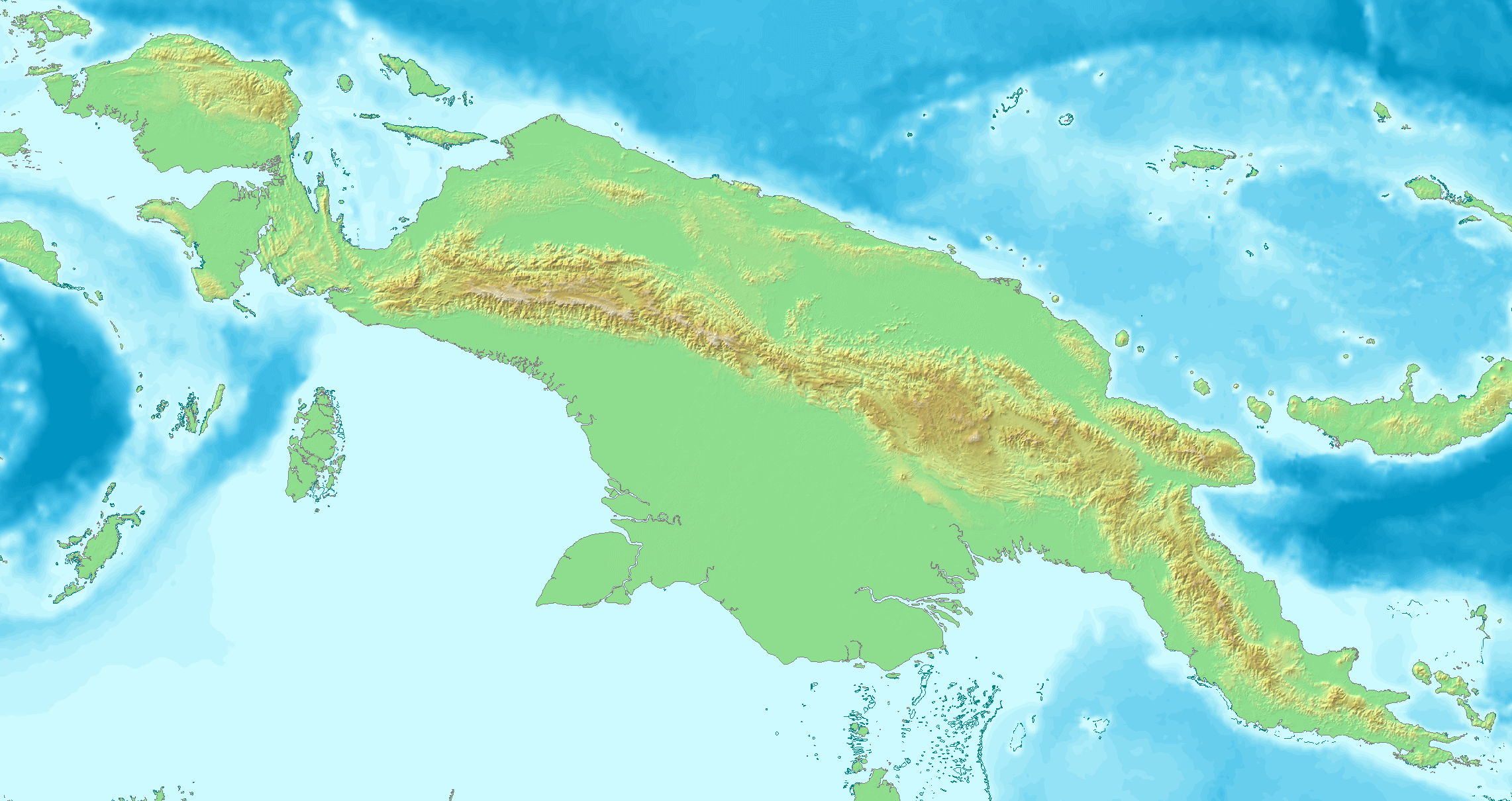
- Location in Western New Guinea Location in Indonesia Location in New Guinea

Runways
Direction	Length		Surface
Direction	m	ft	Surface
11/29	3,571	11,716	Asphalt

Statistics (2024)
- Passengers: 248,702 (▼16.43%)
- Cargo (tonnes): 805.90 (▲0.57%)
- Aircraft movements: 2,882 (▼14.05%)
- Source: DGCA

Frans Kaisiepo International Airport (IATA: BIK, ICAO: WABB), formerly known as Mokmer Airport, is an international airport serving Biak, the largest island in the Biak Archipelago, located in Biak Numfor Regency, Papua Province, Indonesia. The airport is named after Frans Kaisiepo (1921–1979), the fourth Governor of Papua and a designated National Hero of Indonesia who played a key role in the integration of Western New Guinea into Indonesia. The airport is situated approximately 3 km (1.9 miles) from Biak town center and serves as the main gateway to Biak and its surrounding islands. It currently operates regular domestic flights within Papua, including routes to Jayapura and Sorong, as well as to Makassar in South Sulawesi. In the past, the airport handled international flights to destinations such as Amsterdam via Tokyo, operated by KLM, and Los Angeles via Honolulu, operated by Garuda Indonesia. At present, however, the airport does not handle scheduled international services, except for occasional charter flights.

The airport area and runway are also shared with Manuhua Air Force Base, a Type A airbase of the Indonesian Air Force. The airbase is named after Major Lambertus Manuhua, an Indonesian Air Force commando who was killed in combat in 1962 during Operation Trikora. Since 13 June 2019, it has served as the home base of the 27th Air Squadron, which operates CN-235 transport aircraft. It is also the site of Naval Air Station Biak, a Class A facility of the Indonesian Navy’s Naval Aviation, which serves as the home base of the 800th Air Squadron, operating CN-235 maritime patrol aircraft.

== History ==
=== World War II ===
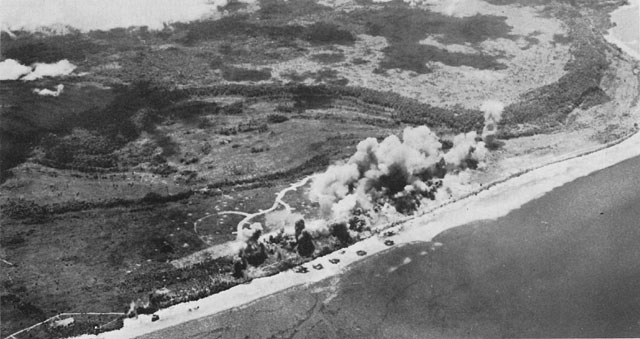
Mokmer Drome under heavy Allied bombardment, 1944

With the outbreak of World War II in the Asia–Pacific region, Japan began occupying New Guinea in 1942. As part of its war effort, the Japanese constructed a number of naval bases and military airfields across the region. On Biak Island, one such facility was built near the village of Ambroben, known as Mokmer Airfield. Constructed by the Japanese using rōmusha labor, the airfield featured a single coral-surfaced runway measuring 2,000 m by 40 m, with taxiways and revetments located to the north. Mokmer Airfield was successfully completed and became capable of supporting both single-engine and twin-engine military aircraft. Mokmer Airfield formed part of a larger complex of airfields on Biak Island—alongside Borokoe and Sorido—originally constructed by the Japanese. These airfields were considered highly strategic by the Japanese, as they supported the movement of troops, logistics, and other military operations against Allied forces in the Pacific Theater. The Allied forces also recognized the strategic importance of these airfields, as capturing the complex would enable them to launch attacks on Japanese positions in the Philippines, making it one of their primary objectives.

In anticipation of a possible landing on Biak, the airfield complex was heavily fortified by the Japanese. They devised an elaborate defensive strategy, allowing American forces to come ashore largely unopposed before advancing into a carefully prepared trap. This trap made use of a network of caves located west of Mokmer and east of Bosnek. The defensive system was designed to transform the area surrounding the vital airfields into a fortified network of caves and pillboxes, manned by riflemen and equipped with automatic weapons, artillery, and mortar batteries, as well as a company of Type 95 Ha-Go light tanks. The caves on the western side were interconnected by underground tunnels and were primarily constructed for combat purposes.

On 27 May 1944, Allied forces landed on Biak, marking the beginning of the Battle of Biak. The following day, they attempted to storm the airfield complex but were repulsed by heavy Japanese resistance and were eventually forced to withdraw. On 5 June, the 186th Infantry Regiment, with the 2nd Battalion of the 162nd Infantry Regiment attached, advanced to the eastern bases of the ridges overlooking Mokmer Strip. A coordinated assault was launched on 7 June, resulting in the capture of Mokmer Strip and the establishment of a beachhead to its south. However, Japanese resistance persisted—particularly from cave positions dominating the area—hindering efforts by engineers to improve the airfield. Engineering work resumed on 13 June but was again disrupted by Japanese counterattacks. Allied engineers were finally able to recommence sustained work on 20 June. Two days later, on 22 June, American forces broke through Japanese defenses and secured the coastal strip from Bosnek to Sorido, including the three airfields at Sorido, Borokoe, and Mokmer.

The Allies subsequently developed Biak into a major logistics base, constructing and rehabilitating several airfields across the area. On nearby Owi Island, U.S. engineers built multiple runways, while Mokmer Drome became operational by 22 June and was further improved and expanded with hardstandings for more than 100 aircraft through July and August. The airfields at Borokoe and Sorido were also redeveloped; however, work at Sorido was not completed due to limited manpower and unsuitable terrain. Although these airfields were not completed in time to support operations against the Marianas in June, they were later used in follow-on operations against the Palau Islands in September. Biak also served as a base for air strikes against targets in Mindanao and the Netherlands East Indies.

==== Major Allied units stationed on Biak Island ====
- 38th Bombardment Group (1–15 October 1944)
- 90th Bombardment Group (10 August 1944 – 26 January 1945)
- 345th Bombardment Group (July – 12 November 1944)
- 49th Fighter Group (5 June – 24 October 1944)
- 475th Fighter Group (14 July – 28 October 1944)
- 6th Reconnaissance Group (August – 3 November 1944)
- 71st Reconnaissance Group (8 August – 5 November 1944)
- 91st Reconnaissance Wing (10 August – 12 November 1944)
- 2d Combat Cargo Group (November 1944 – May 1945)
- 54th Troop Carrier Wing (5 October 1944 – 14 February 1945)
- 374th Troop Carrier Group (14 October 1944 – 28 May 1945)
- 375th Troop Carrier Group (14 October 1944 – 28 May 1945)

=== Dutch era ===
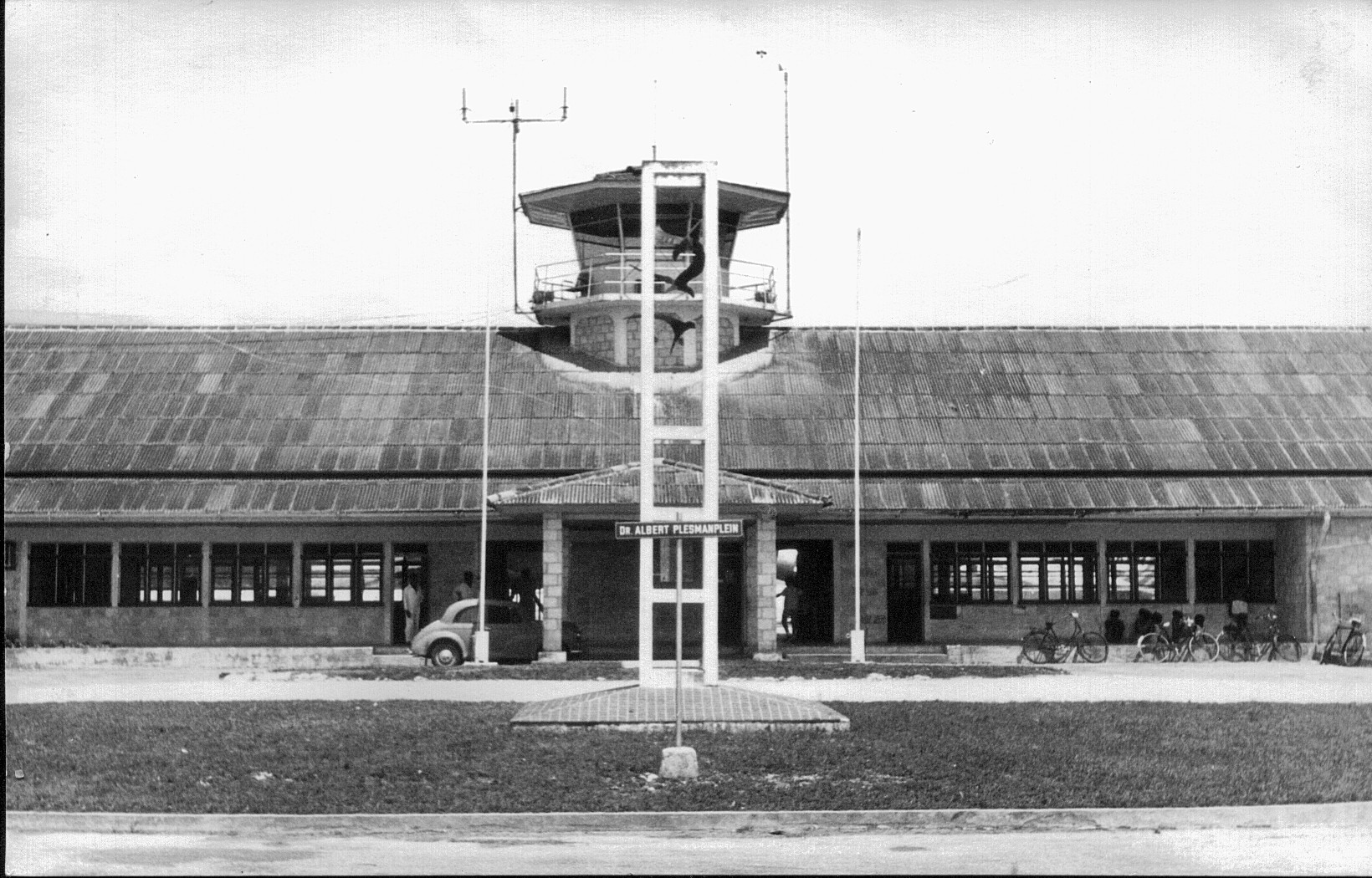
Mokmer Airport in 1961

Postwar, the airfield complex became a major reclamation site for surplus Allied aircraft of various types. The Dutch administration soon took control of the facilities. Sorido Airfield was effectively abandoned following the end of the war and has since been converted into a naval base operated by the Indonesian Navy. Following the Proclamation of Indonesian Independence in 1945, commercial flights began operating to and from Biak using Borokoe Airfield, which had a 2,000 m runway. Mokmer Airfield was not in use at the time, and this remained the case until 1951. In 1953, following a directive from the Governor of Netherlands New Guinea, Borokoe Airfield was closed to passenger traffic. The authorities then began searching for a new airport site, ultimately selecting the former RAAF and Allied airbase at Mokmer. Borokoe Airfield was later repurposed as a base for the Royal Netherlands Air Force in the late 1950s through the early 1960s, during the height of the Western New Guinea dispute, in anticipation of a possible Indonesian attack. The Dutch stationed a squadron of P-2V Neptune aircraft there, later reinforced with Hawker Hunter jets, and maintained operations until their withdrawal in 1962 following the transfer of Western New Guinea to Indonesia. After the Dutch withdrawal, the airfield was taken over by the Indonesian Air Force. On 21 April 1969, Borokoe Airfield was renamed Manuhua Airfield, although its aerial operations were later relocated to what is now Frans Kaisiepo Airport. By at least 1992, the airfield had fallen into disuse.

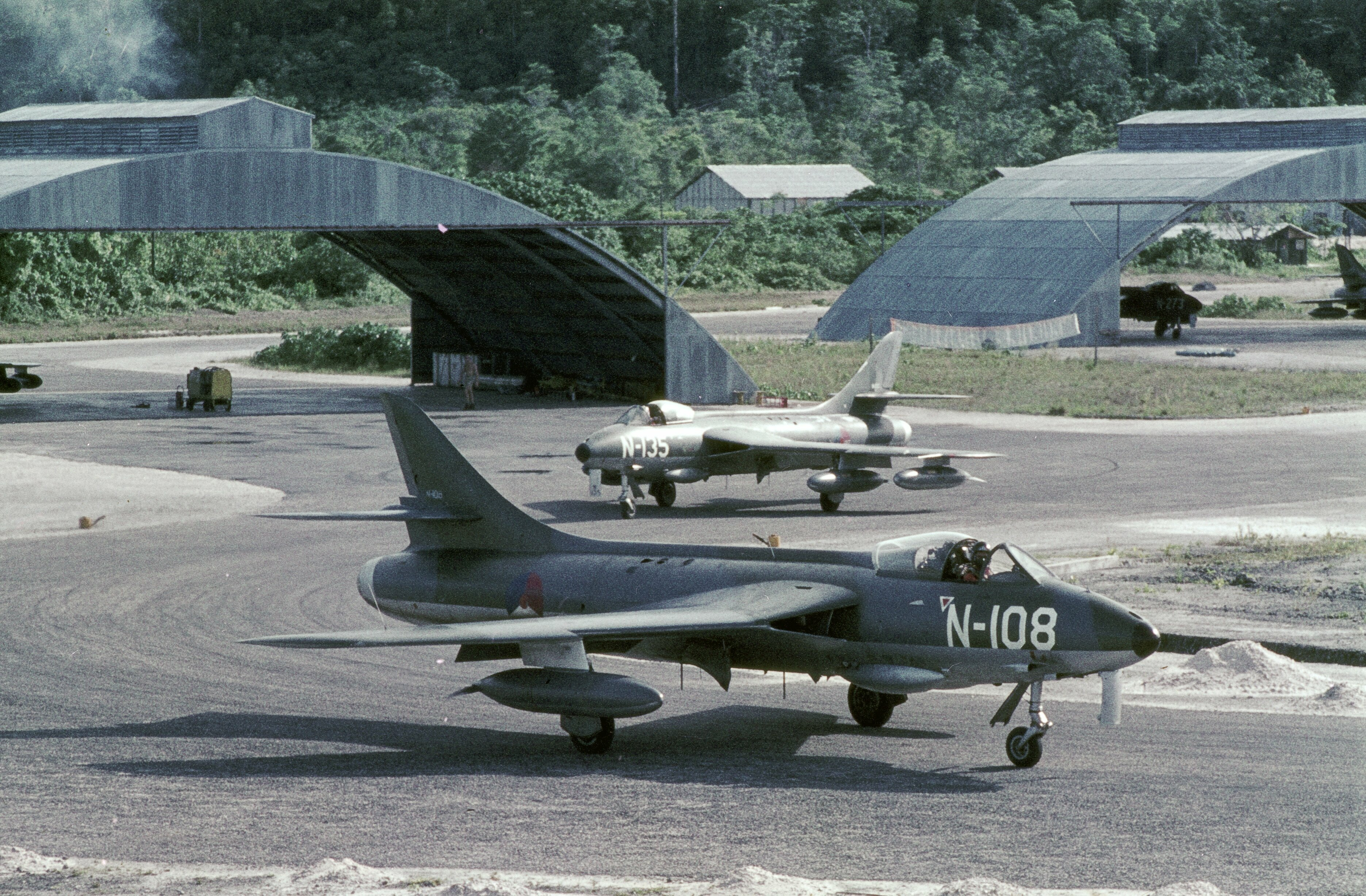
Dutch Hawker Hunter fighter jets in Mokmer Airport, September 1962

In 1952, the Bureau of Civil Aviation (Bureau Luchtvaart) began developing Mokmer Airfield for passenger traffic, with construction carried out in stages. The first phase, completed in 1953, was designed to accommodate Douglas DC-3 aircraft. To support the airport’s operations, the Dutch undertook several related developments, including the construction of a hotel located just a two-minute walk from the airfield. Built by the Dutch airline KLM, it was named the RIF Hotel. The foundation stone for the project was laid in 1952, reflecting plans to incorporate Biak into KLM’s international flight network. Subsequent development phases focused on upgrading Mokmer Airfield to handle larger aircraft such as the Douglas DC-8. Test landings began in December 1959, and a year later, KLM inaugurated the Biak–Tokyo–Amsterdam route. Prior to this, KLM had already operated the Amsterdam–Biak–Sydney route. At the same time, in 1955, the Dutch colonial authorities established NNGLM—commonly known as De Kroonduif—as a subsidiary of KLM to serve domestic routes within Western New Guinea, with Mokmer Airfield functioning as its main hub. In addition to its scheduled services, Kroonduif also offered charter flights to remote and often inaccessible destinations, carrying a wide variety of passengers and cargo. By the late 1950s, the number of routes served by Kroonduif using the Douglas DC-3 Dakota aircraft from Biak had expanded, including destinations such as Hollandia, Manokwari, Ransiki, Sorong, Kebar, Kaimana, Numfor, Merauke, and Tanahmerah.

Following the New York Agreement signed between Indonesia and the Netherlands in 1962, Netherlands New Guinea was slated for transfer to Indonesian control. Between August 1962 and early 1963, a mass repatriation of Dutch nationals took place. During this period, Kroonduif operated at full capacity, transporting Dutch residents from cities such as Hollandia, Merauke, Manokwari, and Sorong to Biak. Mokmer Airfield became the final assembly point for Dutch citizens prior to their departure from the territory. All available KLM aircraft were mobilized for the evacuation, facilitating the return of both civilian and military personnel to the Netherlands via Bangkok, as the handover of sovereignty approached.

=== Modern era ===
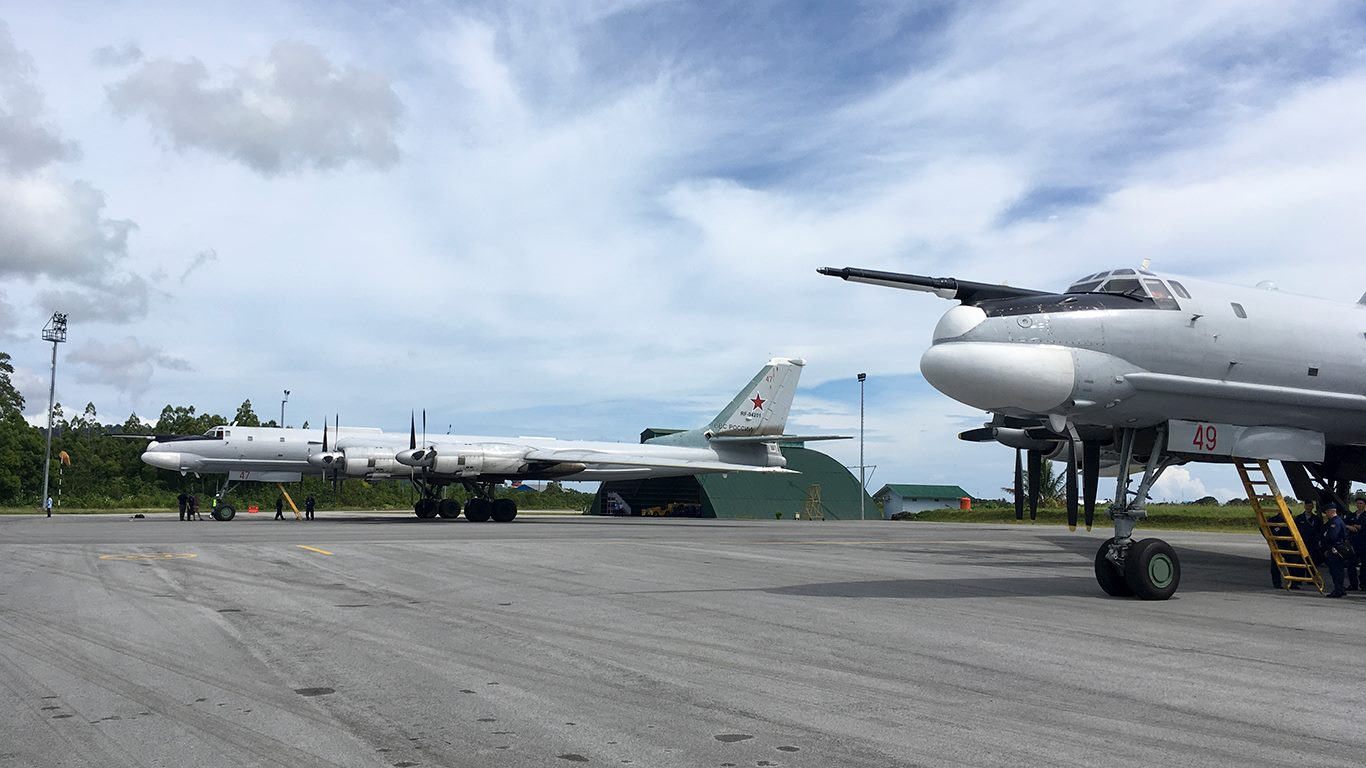
Two Russian Tu-95 bombers at Manuhua airbase, December 2017

Following its takeover by Indonesian authorities, the airport was renamed in 1984 in honor of Frans Kaisiepo, the fourth Governor of Irian Jaya and a native of Biak, who played a key role in the integration of Western New Guinea into Indonesia. In 1990, the airport’s management and operations were transferred to Angkasa Pura I, which was later rebranded as InJourney Airports.

From the 1980s through the 1990s, the airport served as an important stopover for long-haul flights, largely due to its strategic location near the Pacific Ocean and close to the equator. In 1996, Garuda Indonesia incorporated Biak into its trans-Pacific network, operating the Jakarta–Denpasar–Biak–Honolulu–Los Angeles route until 1998, which enabled direct connections from Biak to Honolulu, Hawaii.The airport also handled another international service on the Jakarta–Denpasar–Biak–Seattle route. Covering approximately 206 hectares, the airport features a runway measuring 3,570 m by 45 m, allowing it to accommodate wide-body aircraft. During this period, Garuda Indonesia operated McDonnell Douglas MD-11 aircraft at the airport, while even larger aircraft such as the Boeing 747-400 were capable of landing there. However, the Asian financial crisis in 1998 led to the suspension of these trans-Pacific routes. Since then, Frans Kaisiepo Airport has not hosted regular international flights.

In December 2017, two Tu-95 strategic bombers belonging to the Russian Air Force exercised at the Manuhua Air Force Base, prompting RAAF Base Darwin in Australia to raise its alert level.

In April 2024, the Ministry of Transportation revoked the airport’s international status due to the absence of international flights. The status was reinstated the following year, and the government has since announced plans to open new international routes from Biak to destinations including Papua New Guinea, Australia, Guam, Japan, Singapore, Malaysia, and the United States. International flight services resumed later that year, when Airnorth launched charter flights between Darwin and Biak.

== Facilities and development ==
The airport has a single runway measuring 3,570 m × 45 m, enabling it to accommodate wide-body aircraft such as the Boeing 747 and Airbus A330. It is supported by three taxiways measuring 110 m × 25 m, 105 m × 30 m, and 148 m × 25 m, respectively. The airport also features a single apron measuring 170 m × 89 m.

The airport’s terminal covers an area of 3,069 m² and is capable of handling up to 297,000 passengers annually. It also features a small cargo terminal with an area of 252 m². A renovation of the passenger terminal was completed in 2018. In the future, the cargo terminal will be expanded to a total area of 3,800 square meters. It will be equipped with two cold storage warehouses, each with a capacity of 5 tons, as well as a 60-square-meter transshipment warehouse with a capacity of 65 tons.

== Airlines and destinations ==
=== Passenger ===
Airlines	Destinations
Airnorth	Charter: Darwin
Lion Air	Jayapura, Makassar
Sriwijaya Air	Jayapura
Susi Air	Numfor
Trigana Air	Serui
Wings Air	Sorong

== Statistics ==
Annual passenger numbers and aircraft statistics
Year	Passengers handled	Passenger % change	Cargo (tonnes)	Cargo % change	Aircraft movements	Aircraft % change
2006	318,487	Steady	817.02	Steady	9,916	Steady
2007	308,610	▼3.10	916.59	▲12.19	11,230	▲13.25
2008	344,048	▲11.48	1,158.03	▲26.34	10,561	▼5.96
2009	313,326	▼8.93	1,192.01	▲2.93	9,997	▼5.34
2010	329,105	▲5.04	1,303.60	▲9.36	11,138	▲11.41
2011	448,141	▲36.17	1,233.78	▼5.36	12,427	▲11.57
2012	537,104	▲19.85	1,478.94	▲19.87	12,024	▼3.24
2013	429,758	▼19.99	1,329.44	▼10.11	12,420	▲3.29
2014	346,891	▼19.28	951.00	▼28.47	10,029	▼19.25
2015	361,410	▲4.19	910.05	▼4.31	8,331	▼16.93
2016	406,425	▲12.46	1,083.14	▲19.02	6,932	▼16.79
2017	435,861	▲7.24	1,289.55	▲19.06	6,590	▼4.93
2018	490,345	▲12.50	1,319.78	▲2.34	6,945	▲5.39
2019	309,467	▼36.89	979.36	▼25.79	5,376	▼22.59
2020	151,367	▼51.09	563.22	▼42.49	3,511	▼34.69
2021	186,442	▲23.17	778.90	▲38.29	4,114	▲17.17
2022	308,988	▲65.73	784.33	▲0.70	4,214	▲2.43
2023	297,589	▼3.69	801.34	▲2.17	3,353	▼20.43
2024	248,702	▼16.43	805.90	▲0.57	2,882	▼14.05
^{Source: DGCA, BPS}

== Accidents and incidents ==
- On 16 July 1957, KLM Flight 844, operated by a Lockheed L-1049E Super Constellation en route from Biak to Manila, crashed into Cenderawasih Bay shortly after takeoff from Mokmer Airport. Of the 68 occupants on board—59 passengers and 9 crew members—only 10 survived.

== See also ==
- USAAF in the Southwest Pacific
