= 54th Tactical Fighter Wing =

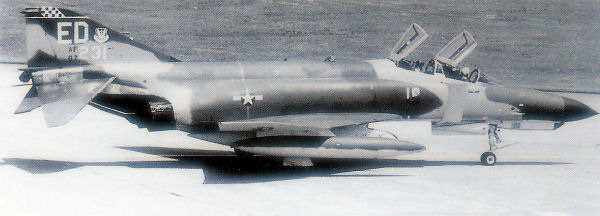
- 16th Tactical Fighter Squadron F-4E Phantom II (Note: Aircraft is McDonnell F-4E Phantom II, serial 67-0231 at Kusan AB, South Korea, in 1970.)
- Active: 1943–1946; 1946–1950; 1970
- Country: United States
- Branch: United States Air Force
- Type: Wing
- Role: Fighter
- Engagements: Southwest Pacific Theater
- Decorations: Philippine Presidential Unit Citation

The 54th Tactical Fighter Wing is an inactive United States Air Force unit. Its last assignment was with the Pacific Air Forces Fifth Air Force, at Kunsan Air Base, South Korea where it was inactivated on 31 October 1970.

During World War II, the 54th Troop Carrier Wing was a Fifth Air Force airlift wing that commanded five combat cargo and troop carrier groups in the South West Pacific Theater.

In the early postwar years, the 54th Fighter Wing commanded 56 units of the Air National Guard throughout the Southeastern United States.

== History ==
=== World War II ===
The 54th Troop Carrier Wing commenced air transport and medical air evacuation operations in support of Fifth Air Force on 26 May 1943. advancing as battle lines permitted.

"The wing employed Douglas C-47 Skytrains almost exclusively, but during late 1943 and much of 1944 also used 13 converted Boeing B-17E Flying Fortresses for armed transport missions in enemy-held territory. The 54th supported every major advance made by the allies in the Southwest Pacific Theater, operating from primitive airstrips carved from jungles and air-dropping cargo where airstrips unavailable."

"The unit took part in the airborne invasion of Nadzab, New Guinea, in September 1943 by dropping paratroopers of the 503rd Parachute Infantry Regiment as well as Australian engineers and heavy equipment. In July 1944, the wing dropped 1,418 paratroopers on Noemfoor Island to aid the Allied invasion forces. Then assumed the task of handling all freight and personnel moving in troop carrier aircraft in the Southwest Pacific, in addition to scheduled and unscheduled air movement of cargo and troops, and air evacuation of wounded personnel."

"Some Curtiss C-46 Commandos began operating within the wing in late 1944, and during 1945 large numbers of C-46s were used in addition to C-47s. By late 1944 and during the early months of 1945, most wing missions were flown to the Philippines. In February 1945, the wing flew three more airborne operations, all in the Philippines, to help encircle Japanese concentrations. Wing C-47s dropped napalm on Carabao Island, in Manila Bay, in March 1945."

"When hostilities ended, the wing moved the entire 11th Airborne Division (11,300 personnel) from the Philippines to Okinawa on short notice, and then began transporting occupation forces into Japan. During September 1945, the wing also evacuated over 17,000 former prisoners of war from Japan to the Philippines."

"The wing served as part of the occupation forces in Japan from 25 September 1945 to about 26 January 1946, while continuing routine air transport operations and a scheduled courier service. Beginning in December 1945 and continuing into mid-1946, most of the wing's components were reassigned to other units or inactivated, and on 15 January 1946 the wing became a component of the Far East (soon, Pacific) Air Service Command."

Moving to the Philippines, the wing gained new components and flew scheduled routes between Japan, the Philippines, Australia, and the Hawaiian Islands. It was replaced by the 403d Troop Carrier Group on 31 May 1946 and was inactivated.

=== Air National Guard ===
Allotted to the National Guard to command units in the Southeastern region of the United States. Extended federal recognition and activated on 2 October 1946.

At the end of October 1950, the Air National Guard converted to the Wing Base Organization. As a result, the wing was withdrawn from the Air National Guard and inactivated on 31 October 1950. The 116th Fighter Wing was allotted to the state of Georgia, federally recognized and activated 1 November 1950; assuming the personnel, equipment and mission of the inactivated wing.

=== United States Air Force ===
"In June 1970, as the 54th Tactical Fighter Wing, was activated and replaced the 354th Tactical Fighter Wing at Kunsan Air Base, South Korea, assuming control of personnel and attached McDonnell F-4C Phantom II squadrons. Was inactivated on 31 October 1970 when the deployed F-4 squadrons returned to the United States and the base was placed in a non-flying status. Base operations personnel were absorbed by the 6175th Air Base Group."

=== Lineage ===
- Established as the 54th Troop Carrier Wing on 26 February 1943

Activated on 13 March 1943
Inactivated on 31 May 1946
Redesignated 54th Fighter Wing, and allotted to the National Guard on 1 June 1946 (Note: Ravenstein says "Air" National Guard, which did not exist until the Air Force became a separate service.)
Organized in the Georgia National Guard on 8 July 1946
Extended federal recognition on 2 October 1946
Ordered to active service on 10 October 1950
Inactivated, and returned to the control of the Department of the Air Force on 11 October 1950
Redesignated 54th Tactical Fighter Wing on 5 June 1970
Activated on 15 June 1970
Inactivated on 31 October 1970

=== Assignments ===
- Fifth Air Force, 13 March 1943
- Far East Air Service Command (later Pacific Air Service Command), 15 January – 31 May 1946
- Georgia National Guard, 8 July 1946
- Fourteenth Air Force, 10–11 October 1950
- Fifth Air Force, 15 June – 31 October 1970 (attached to Detachment 1, Headquarters Fifth Air Force [5th ADVON] until 30 September 1970)

=== Components ===
==== World War II ====
- 2d Combat Cargo Group, 13 December 1944 – 5 January 1946
- 317th Troop Carrier Group, 1 October 1943 – 15 January 1946
- 374th Troop Carrier Group, 26 May – 28 September 1943
- 375th Troop Carrier Group, 12 July 1943 – 15 January 1946
- 433d Troop Carrier Group, 4 October 1943 – 5 January 1946
- 1st Troop Carrier Squadron (Philippine Army), 26 January – 31 May 1946
- 9th Troop Carrier Squadron, 15 January – 15 February 1946
- 16th Tactical Fighter Squadron, 15 June – 7 September 1970
- 311th Troop Carrier Squadron, 15 February – 15 May 1946
- 316th Troop Carrier Squadron, 15 February – 25 March 1946
- 801st Medical Air Evacuation Squadron, after Bougainville Campaign
- 3rd Air Cargo Control Squadron, 24 November – 18 December 1944, 1 December 1945 – 5 January 1946

==== Georgia Air National Guard ====
- 116th Fighter Group, 9 September 1946 – 10 October 1950
- 117th Fighter Group, 1 October 1947 – 11 October 1950 (Alabama ANG)
- 118th Fighter Group, 2 October 1947 – 11 October 1950 (Tennessee ANG)
- 105th Fighter Squadron, 23 January 1947 – 2 October 1947 (Tennessee Air National Guard)
- 106th Bombardment Squadron, 1 November 1946 – 1 March 1947 (Alabama Air National Guard)
- 153d Fighter Squadron. 2 October 1946 – 1 October 1947 (Georgia Air National Guard)
- 155th Fighter Squadron, 23 December 1946 – 2 October 1947 (Tennessee Air National Guard)
- 156th Fighter Squadron, 2 October 1946 – 2 October 1947 (North Carolina ANG)
- 198th Fighter Squadron, 1 October 1947 – 11 October 1950 (Puerto Rico Air National Guard)

==== United States Air Force ====
- 16th Tactical Fighter Squadron, 15 June – 7 September 1970 (Attached)
- 478th Tactical Fighter Squadron, 15 June – 2 September 1970 (Attached)

=== Stations ===
Kunsan Air Force Base 1970-1982 F-4E Close Air Support/Reconnaissance. The F-4D/E started phasing out in to F-16A Falcons in 1982

- Archerfield Airport (Brisbane), Australia, 13 March 1943
- Wards Airfield 5 Mile Drome, Port Moresby, New Guinea, 3 May 1943
- Nadzab Airfield, New Guinea, 18 April 1944
- Mokmer Airfield, Biak, Netherlands East Indies, 5 October 1944
- Bayug Airfield, Leyte, Philippines, 14 February 1945
- Clark Field, Luzon, Philippines, June 1945
- Tachikawa Airfield, Japan, September 1945
- Manila, Luzon, 26 January – 31 May 1946
- Marietta Army Air Field (Later Marietta Air Force Base, Dobbins Air Force Base), Georgia, 8 July 1946 – 11 October 1950
- Kunsan Air Base, South Korea, 15 June – 31 October 1970

== See also ==
- United States Army Air Forces in Australia
