= James P. Ulm =

United States Air Force general

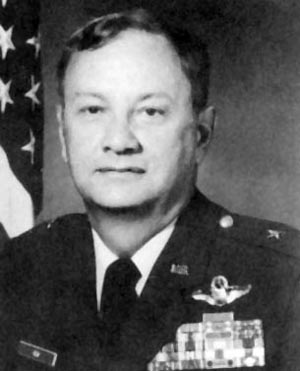
- Born: 1937 (age 88–89); Frankfort, Indiana
- Military career
- Allegiance: United States of America
- Branch: Air Force
- Service years: 1961–1991
- Rank: Brigadier General
- Commands: 14th Flying Training Wing; 8th Flying Training Squadron
- Conflicts: Vietnam War
- Awards: Legion of Merit; Distinguished Flying Cross; Meritorious Service Medal with three oak leaf clusters Air Medal with four oak leaf clusters.

James Paul Ulm is a retired brigadier general in the United States Air Force.

== Biography ==
Ulm was born in Frankfort, Indiana in 1937 and raised in Lakewood, Ohio. He graduated from George Washington University with a master's degree in 1973.

== Career ==
Ulm graduated from the United States Air Force Academy with a bachelor's degree in 1961. He then began training at Reese Air Force Base. After the completion of his training, he was stationed at McChord AFB. Ulm underwent further training in 1965 and was later stationed at Andersen Air Force Base. In 1968, he was deployed to serve in the Vietnam War and was assigned to Tuy Hoa Air Base.

After returning to the United States, he served at Military Airlift Command and the United States Air Force Academy. He then attended the Naval War College. In 1973, he was assigned to The Pentagon. From there, he became a recruiting squadron commander in Milwaukee, Wisconsin. In 1978, Ulm joined the 71st Flying Training Wing. During that time, he commanded the 8th Flying Training Squadron. In 1981, he began attending the Air War College.

From 1982 to 1983, he served as Deputy Commander for Operations of the 64th Flying Training Wing. He then became Director of Standardization and Evaluation of Air Training Command. In 1984, Ulm assumed command of the 14th Flying Training Wing. He returned to Air Training Command in 1987 as Inspector General. Later that year, he transferred to North American Aerospace Defense Command as Command Director. He became Vice Director of Combat Operations in 1989 and Director of the Planning Staff in 1990. Ulm retired in 1991.

Awards he received during his career include the Legion of Merit, the Distinguished Flying Cross, the Meritorious Service Medal with three oak leaf clusters and the Air Medal with four oak leaf clusters.
