= 26th Weapons Squadron =

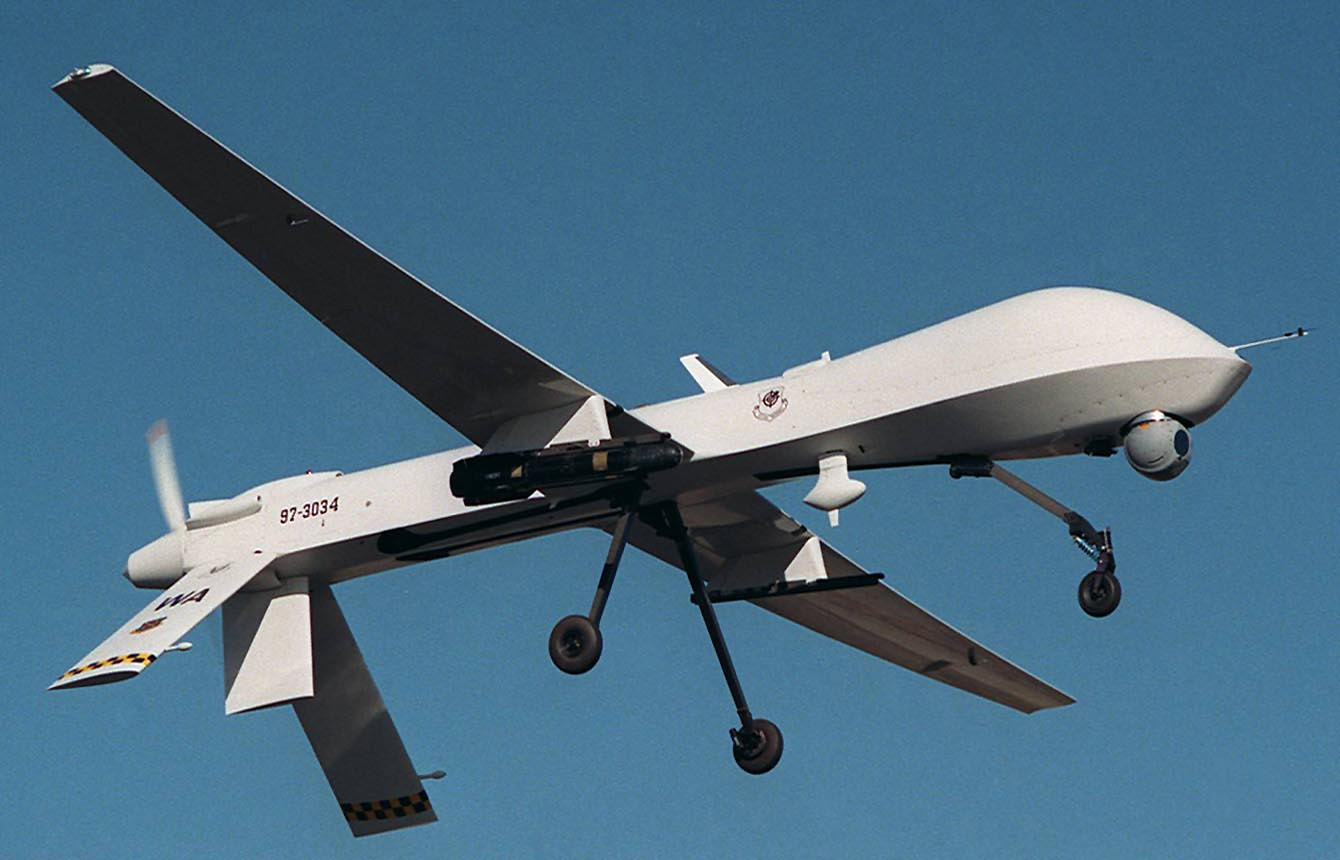
- 26th MQ-1 Predator Unmanned Aerial Vehicle in flight
- Active: 1941–1945; 1946–1959; 1990–1992; 2008–present
- Country: United States
- Branch: United States Air Force
- Type: Squadron
- Role: Advanced Unmanned Aerial Vehicle Training
- Part of: Air Combat Command
- Garrison/HQ: Nellis AFB, Nevada
- Nicknames: China Blitzers (1942–1945), Flying Horse Squadron (1945)
- Tail Code: "WA"
- Engagements: China-Burma-India Theater

- Decorations: Distinguished Unit Citation Air Force Outstanding Unit Award

Insignia
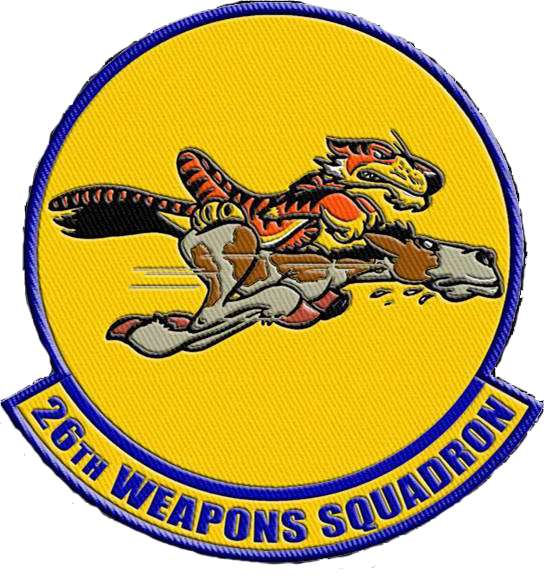
- 26th Weapons Squadron emblem (modified 28 January 2009)

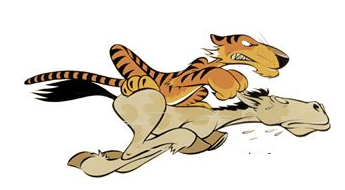
- 26th Fighter Squadron emblem (approved 30 March 1945)

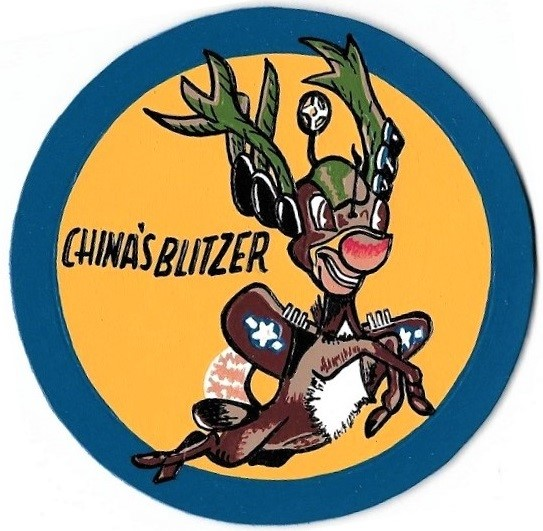
- 26th Fighter Squadron emblem (CBI Theater)

The 26th Weapons Squadron is a United States Air Force unit, assigned to the USAF Weapons School at Nellis Air Force Base, Nevada

== Overview ==
The 26th Weapons Squadron is the first unmanned aircraft systems weapons squadron, and specializes in training and producing MQ-9 Reaper pilots and sensor operators. Until its retirement in 2018, the squadron also conducted the same training for crews flying the MQ-1 Predator. Missions for the 26th Weapons Squadron are flown from Nellis Air Force Base, as opposed to Creech Air Force Base, where most UAS operations are currently underway.

== History ==
=== World War II ===
Activated as the 26th Pursuit Squadron at Hamilton Field, California in January 1941 as a Curtiss P-40 Warhawk pursuit squadron to defend the West Coast. Deployed to the China-Burma-India Theater in March 1942, initially arriving at Karachi, India moving via Australia and Ceylon. It was assigned to Tenth Air Force. The squadron defended the Indian terminus of the Hump airlift route over the Himalayas between India and China and airfields in that area, operating from the Assam Valley of northeast India. The squadron flew strafing, bombing, reconnaissance, and patrol missions in support of Allied ground troops during a Japanese offensive in northern Burma in 1943.

Moved to southeast China in October 1943, being assigned to Fourteenth Air Force. The squadron defended the Chinese end of the Hump route and air bases in the Kunming area. Attacked Japanese shipping in the Red River delta of Indochina and supported Chinese ground forces in their late 1944 drive along the Salween River. Was reequipped with North American P-51D Mustangs in 1945 to defend the eastern end of the route over the Hump, and to guard air bases in the Kunming area.

It returned to India in the fall of 1945 and sailed for the United States in November. Inactivated on 13 December 1945.

=== Cold War ===
Reactivated at Yontan Air Base Okinawa in 1946 and moved to Naha Air Base when Yontan closed in 1947. The squadron was assigned to the Twentieth Air Force, 301st Fighter Wing. The squadron served as part of the occupation force and provided air defense for Okinawa and the Ryukyu Islands until 1955, the 26th Fighter Interceptor Squadron Deployed to Tainan Air Base, Taiwan from 3 March – 2 April 1955. Pilots engaging in combat operations in Korean War, 1950–1953. Moved to Clark Air Base, Philippines in 1955, providing air defense of the Philippines until 1959 when inactivated due to budget restraints.

=== Pilot training ===
Conducted undergraduate pilot training at Vance Air Force Base, Oklahoma, 1990–1992, flying Northrop T-38 Talons until inactivated as part of the post Cold War shutdown.

=== Advanced UAV training ===
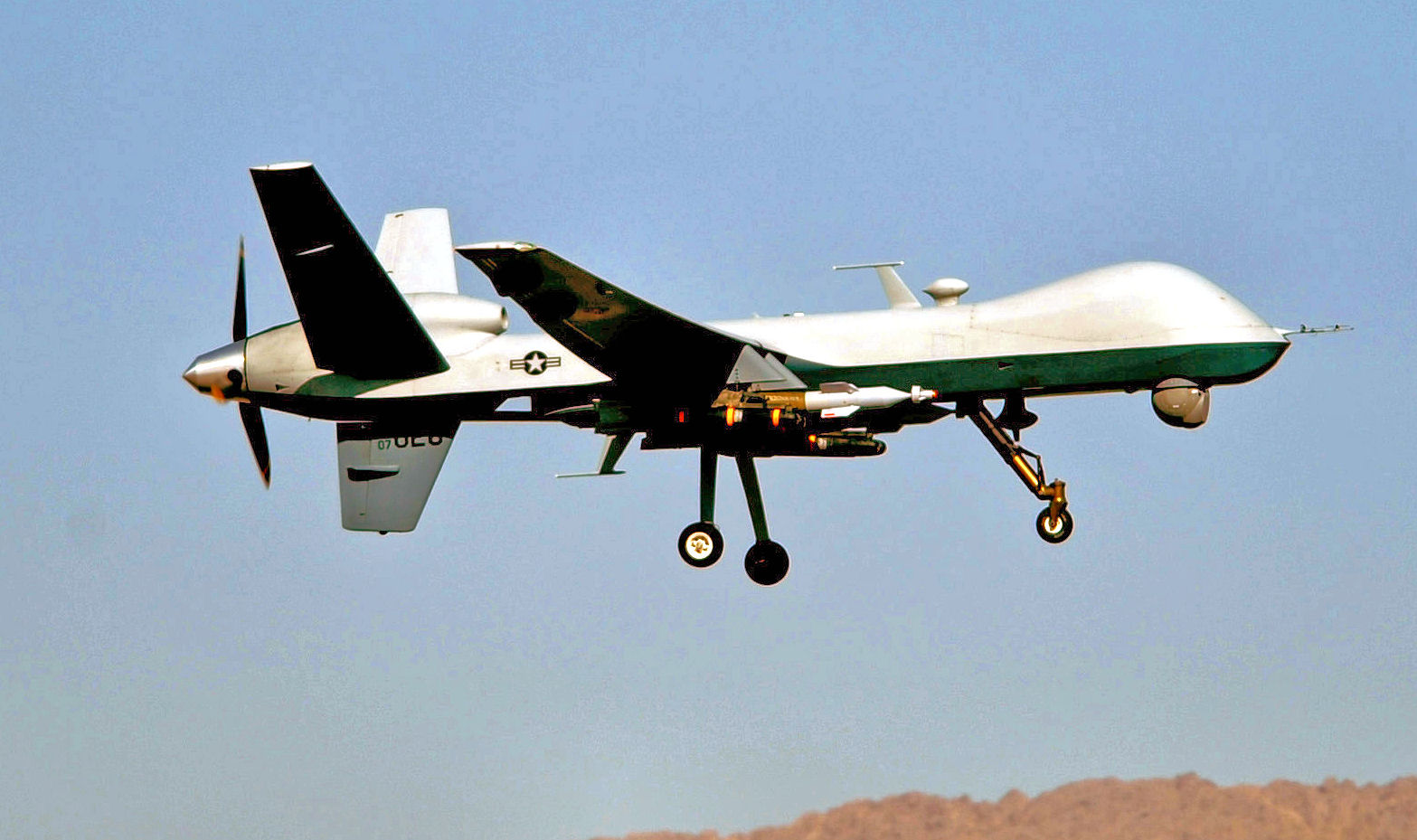
MQ-9 Reaper in Afghanistan

Reactivated in 2008 at Nellis AFB, Nevada as part of the USAF Weapons School, specializing in training and producing MQ-1 Predator and MQ-9 Reaper pilots and sensor operators.

== Lineage ==
- Constituted as the 26th Pursuit Squadron (Interceptor) on 20 November 1940

Activated on 15 January 1941
Redesignated 26th Pursuit Squadron (Fighter) on 12 March 1941
Redesignated 26th Fighter Squadron (Twin Engine) on 15 May 1942
Redesignated 26th Fighter Squadron on 1 June 1942
Inactivated on 13 December 1945

- Activated on 15 October 1946

Redesignated 26th Fighter Squadron, Jet-Propelled on 19 February 1947
Redesignated 26th Fighter Squadron, Jet on 10 August 1948
Redesignated 26th Fighter-Interceptor Squadron on 1 February 1950
Inactivated on 9 April 1959

- Redesignated 26th Flying Training Squadron on 13 December 1989

Activated on 19 January 1990
Inactivated on 1 October 1992

- Redesignated 26th Weapons Squadron on 18 September 2008

Activated on 30 September 2008

=== Assignments ===
- 51st Pursuit Group (later 51st Fighter Group), 15 January 1941 – 13 December 1945
- 51st Fighter Group (later 51st Fighter-Interceptor Group), 15 October 1946 (attached to 6302d Air Base Group, 20 September 1950, 6351st Air Base Wing, 25 June 1951, Thirteenth Air Force, 11 November 1954)
- Thirteenth Air Force, 1 October 1957
- 6200th Air Base Wing, 5 June 1958 – 9 April 1959
- 71st Flying Training Wing, 19 January 1990
- 71st Operations Group, 15 December 1991 – 1 October 1992
- USAF Weapons School, 30 September 2008 – present

=== Stations ===
- Hamilton Field, California, 15 January 1941
- March Field, California, 10 June 1941 – 11 January 1942
- Karachi Airport, India, 13 March 1942
- Dinjan Airfield, India, 10 October 1942
- Kunming Airport, China, c. 7 October 1943

Detachments operated from:

Nanning Airfield, China, c. 8 March – November 1944
Liangshan Airfield, China, – 20 May June 1944
Kweilin Airfield, China, 20–30 June 1944
Poseh Airfield, China, January 1945
Liangshan Airfield, China, January and March 1945
Laohokow Airfield, China, January–February 1945

- Nanning Airfield, China, 1 August 1945
- Loping Airfield, China, September–November 1945
- Fort Lewis, Washington, 12–13 December 1945
- Yontan Airfield, Okinawa, 15 October 1946
- Naha Air Base, Okinawa, 22 May 1947
- Clark Air Base, Luzon, Philippines, 11 July 1955 – 9 April 1959
- Vance Air Force Base, Oklahoma, 19 January 1990 – 1 October 1992
- Nellis Air Force Base, Nevada, 30 September 2008 – present

=== Aircraft ===
- Curtiss P-40 Warhawk, 1941–1944
- North American P-51 Mustang, 1944–1945
- Republic P-47 Thunderbolt, 1946–1947
- Lockheed F-80 Shooting Star, 1947–1954
- North American F-86D Sabre, 1954–1959
- Northrop T-38 Talon, 1990–1992
- General Atomics MQ-1 Predator, 2008–2018
- General Atomics MQ-9 Reaper, 2008–present
