= 82nd Reconnaissance Squadron =

US Air Force squadron

82d Reconnaissance Squadron
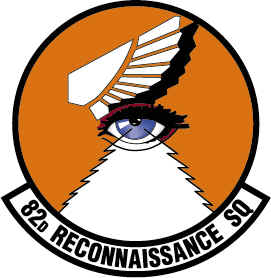
- 82d Reconnaissance Squadron Patch
- Active: 1 June 1937 – 1 April 1949; 24 January 1955 – 1 July 1957; 25 August 1967 – 30 September 1976; 2 October 1991 - present
- Country: United States
- Branch: United States Air Force
- Type: Reconnaissance and Surveillance
- Part of: Air Combat Command; 12th Air Force; 55th Wing; 55th Operations Group
- Garrison/HQ: Kadena Air Base
- Decorations: DUC AFOUA w/ V Device PPUC RVGC w/ Palm

The 82d Reconnaissance Squadron is part of the 55th Wing at Offutt Air Force Base, Nebraska, USA. It is geographically separated from the 55th, operating from Kadena Air Base in Japan. The squadron operates Boeing RC-135 aircraft flying reconnaissance missions.

== History ==
The 82d flew antisubmarine patrols off the California coast from 8 December 1941 to 16 August 1942. It went on to fly combat sorties in the Southwest and Western Pacific from 27 November 1943 to 15 August 1945.

On 11 January 1945, while flying an F-6D Mustang on an armed reconnaissance mission over northern Luzon in the Philippines, Captain William A. Shomo, the squadron commander at the time, sighted a Japanese formation of twelve fighters escorting a bomber. He attacked and succeeded in shooting down the bomber and six of the fighters while his wingman, Lieutenant Paul Lipscomb, shot down three more fighters. Shomo was awarded the Medal of Honor for this action.

The squadron flew strategic reconnaissance over Southeast Asia from August 1967 to March 1973.

=== Operations ===
- World War II
- Vietnam War

=== Lineage ===
- 82d Observation Squadron (1937–1942)
- 82d Observation Squadron (Medium) (1942)
- 82d Observation Squadron (1942–1943)
- 82d Reconnaissance Squadron (Fighter) (1943–1944)
- 82d Tactical Reconnaissance Squadron (1944–1947)
- 82d Reconnaissance Squadron, Photographic (Jet-Propelled) (1947–1948)
- 82d Tactical Reconnaissance Squadron, Photo-Jet (1948–1954)
- 82d Strategic Reconnaissance Squadron, Fighter (1954–1967)
- 82d Strategic Reconnaissance Squadron (1967–1991)
- 82d Reconnaissance Squadron (1991 – present)

== Assignments ==
- IX Corps Area (1937–1940)
- 4th Army (1940–1941)
- III Corps (1941)
- 4th Air Force (1941)
- 69th Observation Group (1941–1942)
- 71st Reconnaissance Group (1942–1946)
  - Attached: 35th Fighter Group (20 October 1945 – 9 February 1946)
- V Bomber Command (1946)
- 314th Composite Wing (1946–1947)
- 71st Tactical Reconnaissance Group (1947–1949)
- 71st Strategic Reconnaissance Wing (1955–1957)
- 3d Air Division (1967–1968)
- 4252d Strategic Wing (1968–1970)
- 376th Strategic Wing (1970–1976)
- 55th Wing (1991 – present)

== Stations ==
- Moffett Field, California (1937–1940)
  - Flight at: Brooks Field, Texas (28 June 1940 – 9 April 1941)
- Hamilton Field, California (1940–1941)
- Salinas, California (1941–1943)
- Esler Field, Louisiana (1943)
- Laurel Army Air Field, Mississippi (1943)
- Milne Bay, New Guinea (1943)
- Dobodura, New Guinea (1943–1944)
  - Detachment: Finschhafen, New Guinea (December 1943 - 19 April 1944)
- Saidor, New Guinea (1944)
- Biak (1944)
- Owi, Schouten Islands (1944)
- Morotai (1944–1945)
  - Air Echelon: San Jose, Mindoro (29 December 1944 – 17 January 1945)
- Lingayen, Luzon (1945)
- Ie Shima Airfield, Okinawa, (1945)
- Irumagawa Air Base, Japan (1945–1947)
- Yokota Air Base, Japan (1947–1949)
- Johnson Air Base, Japan (1949)
- Larson Air Force Base, Washington (1955–1957)
- Yokota Air Base, Japan (1967–1968)
- Kadena Air Base, Japan (1968–1976, 1991 – present)

== Aircraft operated ==
- O-31 (1937 - c. 1938)
- O-43 (1937 - c. 1938)
- O-47 (c. 1938 - 1940, 1941–1942)
- O-46 (1940–1942)
- O-49 Vigilant (1941–1942)
- O-52 Owl (1941–1942)
- A-20 Havoc (1942–1943)
- B-25 Mitchell (1942–1943, 1946)
- P-39 Airacobra (1942–1944)
- P-40 Warhawk (1942–1943, 1944–1945)
- F-6 Mustang (1944–1947)
- F-5 Lightning (1946)
- FP-80 Shooting Star (1947 - 1945)
- A-26 Invader (1946–1947)
- F-2 Expeditor (1947–1948)
- RF-61 Reporter (1949)
- RF-84 Thunderflash (1955–1957)
- RC-135 (1967–1976, 1991 – present)
