= 3rd Flying Training Squadron =

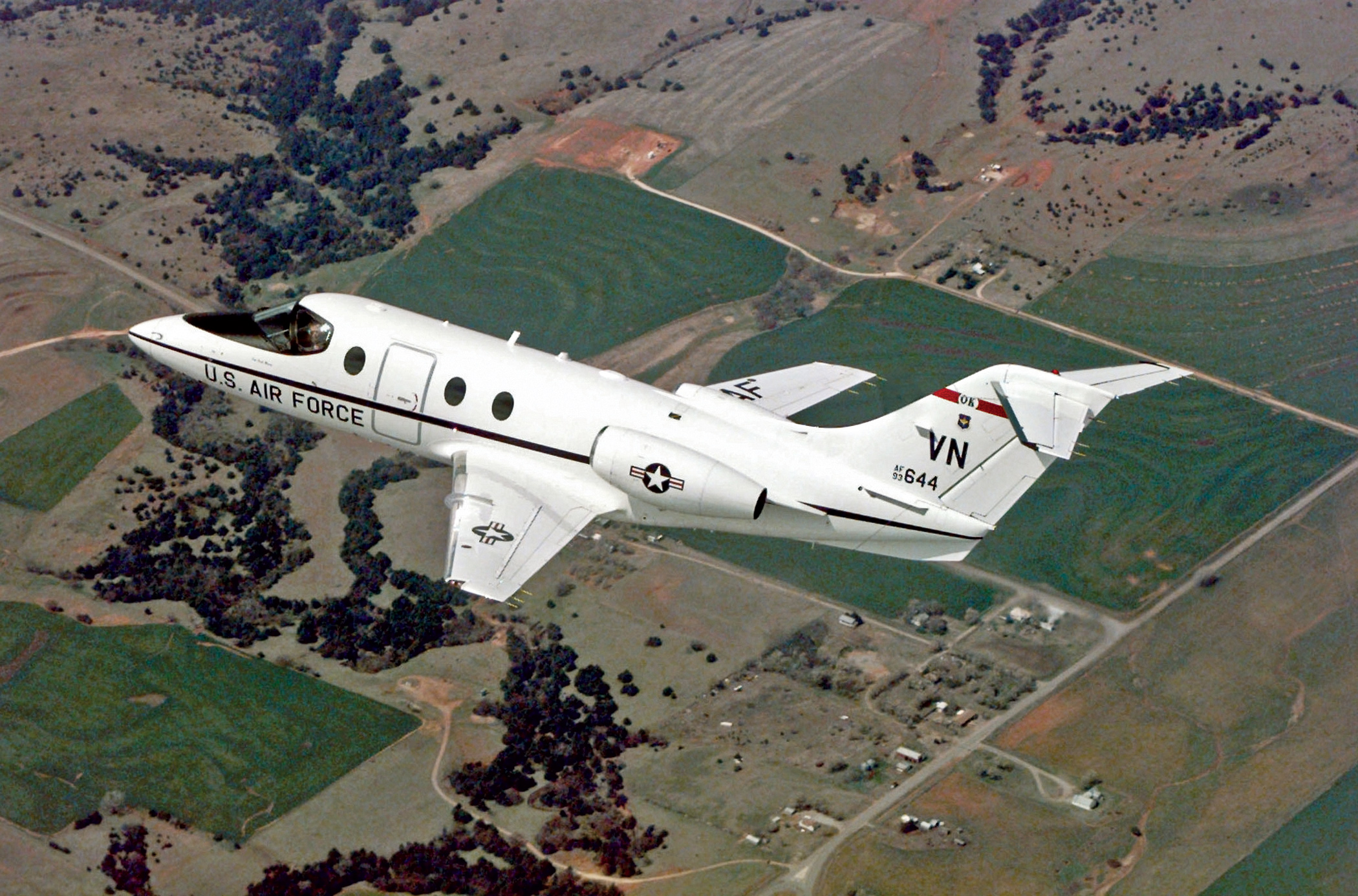
- T-1A Jayhawk, 3rd Flying Training Squadron
- Active: 1916–1919; 1919–1946; 1973–1993; 1994–2000; 2001–c. 2011; 2012–2026
- Country: United States
- Branch: United States Air Force
- Role: Pilot Training
- Engagements: World War II Battle of the Philippines
- Decorations: Distinguished Unit Citation; Air Force Outstanding Unit Award with Combat "V" Device; Philippine Presidential Unit Citation

Insignia
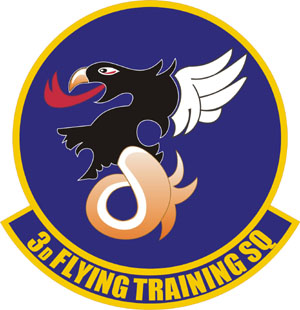
- 3rd Flying Training Squadron emblem (Note: Modified 18 September 1995.)

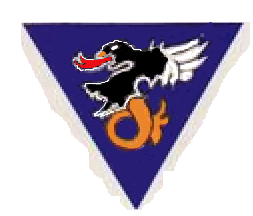
- 3rd Pursuit Squadron emblem (Note: Approved 24 February 1924.)

The 3rd Flying Training Squadron was part of the 71st Operations Group under the 71st Flying Training Wing. It operated the T-1A Jayhawk aircraft conducting advanced phase tanker/transport flight training.

The 3rd FTS was the third-oldest squadron in the Air Force, with over 95 years of service to the nation, its origins date to the organization of the 3rd Aero Squadron on 1 November 1916 at Fort Sam Houston, Texas. Deployed to the Philippines after World War I, during the 1941-1942 Battle of the Philippines, it was wiped out, with some of its personnel being forced by the Japanese to endure the Bataan Death March. It was not reactivated until 1973. The unit inactivated on 31 August 2026.

== History ==
=== Origins ===
The 3rd Flying Training Squadron dates to the organization of the 3rd Aero Squadron on 1 November 1916 at Fort Sam Houston, Texas. Most of the officers and men of the Squadron were transferred from the Aviation School at Rockwell Field, San Diego, California, where, at the time, all Army aviators were trained. There, it replaced the 1st Aero Squadron, whose members were sent to Columbus Airfield, New Mexico as part of the Punitive expedition against Pancho Villa. There, the squadron may have operated some Curtiss JN-3s and possibly some Curtiss N-8s, preparing them to be sent south to Columbus.

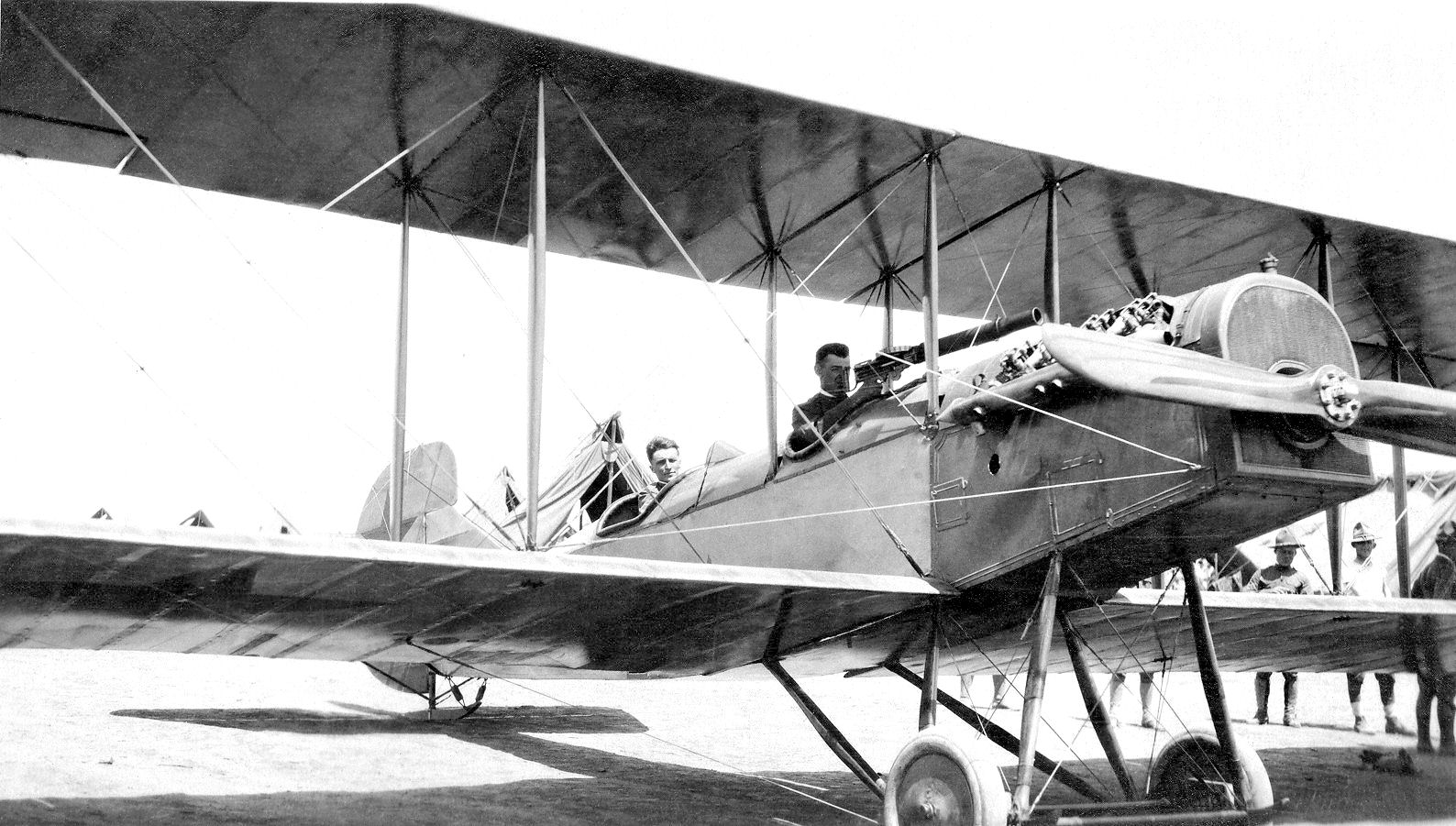
Curtiss R-2 assembly at Kelly Field, Texas, 1917

In December 1916, Congress authorized the lease of a 700-acre tract of land seven miles south of San Antonio, Texas for a new airfield to accommodate the rapidly expanding Aviation Section of the Signal Corps. By March 1917, men from the 3rd Aero Squadron were hard at work clearing the cotton plants from the land and laying foundations for hangars and mess halls at what would become Kelly Field. On 5 April 1917, one day before the United States entered World War I, four Curtiss JN-4 "Jennies" landed at the new field.

On 29 August 1917 the 3rd Aero Squadron left Kelly Field for Fort Sill, Oklahoma with 12 Curtiss R4 airplanes under the command of a Captain Weir to establish a new training airfield. The squadron was assigned to Henry Post Field (named after 2nd Lt. Henry B. Post who was killed in a plane crash in California in 1914). It was re-designated as Squadron A, Henry Post Field, Oklahoma. on 22 July 1918. At Post Field, the 3rd was most likely an observer training unit in support of the United States Army Field Artillery School. In September 1917, the 4th Aero Squadron was transferred to Post Field from Fort Sam Houston, as a second training squadron. The 3rd was ordered to transfer 135 men to the 4th to bring the squadron up to its authorized strength. The 3rd was redesignated as "Squadron A", with the 4th being redesignated as "Squadron B" in July 1918. Both squadrons were demobilized at the end of World War I on 2 January 1919.

=== Philippines Duty ===
The unit was re-formed as a new unit, designated as the 3rd Aero Squadron, on 13 May 1919 at Mitchel Field, New York. Many of the men were experienced mechanics and officers who had served either in France or at training units in the United States during World War I. After being organized, the squadron was transferred by train to San Francisco, California, where it boarded a ship bound for Manila, in the Philippine Islands, arriving on 18 August. The squadron was assigned to the Philippine Department, and was stationed initially at Camp Stotsenburg on Luzon. Some Dayton-Wright DH-4s, which were used as trainers during the war in the United States, arrived later in 1919 and were assigned to the squadron.

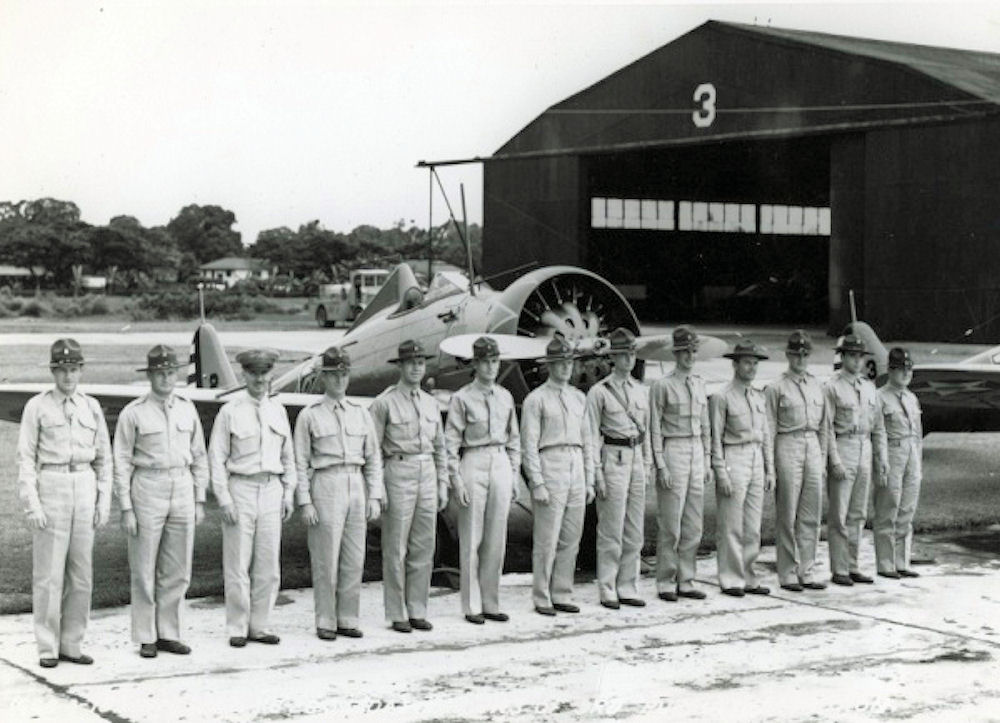
Officers of the 3rd Pursuit Squadron in formation in front of a squadron Boeing P-26 Peashooter, Clark Field, Luzon, Philippines, 1937.

On 10 March 1920, along with the 2d Aero Squadron, which had arrived in December 1919, the squadrons were organized into the 1st Group (Observation). On 14 March 1921, the squadron was re-designated as the 3rd Squadron (Pursuit), its mission was to provide coastal aerial defense as part of the 4th Composite Group, a re-designation of the 1st Group. In 1924, the squadron was formally consolidated with its World War I predecessor organization, giving it a history dating to 1 November 1916.

Exercises and maneuvers with Army ground forces and Naval forces were a regular and important part of its mission. In the Philippines, the squadron received a wide variety of second-line hand-me-down aircraft transferred from units in the United States during the austere years of Air Corps procurement during the 1920s and 1930s

As a result of the rising tensions with the Japanese Empire in 1940, the defenses of the Philippines were judged to be abysmal, and a reinforcement effort was made to defend the islands against any Japanese aggression. The 3rd had received P-26 Peashooters in 1937, the latest in the line of second-line aircraft. These obsolete aircraft were replaced in early 1941 with impressed export versions of the Seversky P-35 being designated EP-106 by the company that were manufactured for the Swedish Air Force. On 24 October 1940, President Franklin Roosevelt signed an executive order requisitioning all the undelivered EP-106 aircraft and impressing them into the USAAC. These were designated P-35A by the Army, and 40 planes were sent to the Philippines during 1941 to bolster the islands' defenses. The P-35As were replaced by Curtiss P-40 Warhawks in late 1941. On 1 September 1941, the squadron was moved to the new Iba Airfield, in an effort to disperse the fighter strength of the 4th Composite Group. On 1 November, it was assigned to the new 24th Pursuit Group in a reorganization of the Far East Air Force assets in the Philippines.

=== World War II ===
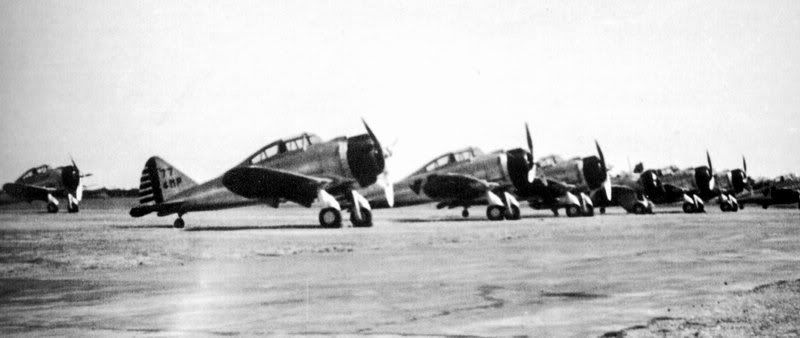
3rd Pursuit Squadron P-35As at Nichols Field, Luzon, Philippines.

The first word of the Japanese attack on Pearl Harbor was received by commercial radio between 0300 and 0330 hours local on 8 December 1941 in the Philippines. Within 30 minutes radar at Iba Field, Luzon plotted a formation of airplanes 75-miles (120-km) offshore, heading for Corregidor Island. P-40's from the squadron were sent out to intercept but made no contact. By 1130 hours, the fighters sent into the air earlier landed for refueling, and radar disclosed another flight of Japanese aircraft 70-miles (112-km) West of Lingayen Gulf, headed south. Fighters from the 3rd made another fruitless search over the South China Sea. The P-40's sent on patrol over the South China Sea returned to Iba with fuel running low at the beginning of a Japanese attack on the airfield. The P-40's failed to prevent the bombing but did manage to prevent the Japanese Zeros from a low-level strafe of the airfield and its ground support facilities. Zero low-level strafing had proved extremely destructive at Clark Field earlier that day. The RADAR facilities at Iba, however, were destroyed in the attack.

The P-40s that survived the initial Japanese attack were able to meet the Zeros on near equal terms, but the P-40 lacked the maneuverability of the lighter Japanese plane. On 9 December, the 3rd Pursuit Squadron was ordered to move to Nichols Field, to provide air defense of the Manila area. Bad weather delayed additional attacks until 10 December However, without any early warning Radar, the squadron received only a few minutes notice of a second major Japanese air attack focused on Nichols Field and the Naval facilities at Cavite. The remaining pilots prepared to meet the enemy formations. However, the standing patrols being flown had left those planes in the air low on fuel. The planes on alert took off to attempt interception however before they could reach the altitude of the attacking Japanese bombers, they were swarmed on by Zeros. Combats broke out across the sky and although outnumbered nearly three to one, the 3rd Pursuit pilots did well, downing more Japanese aircraft than they lost. However, as they ran out of fuel, they had to break off and land wherever they could find a field. By the end of the day, the strength of the entire 24th Pursuit Group consisted of twenty-two P-40s and eight P-35s.

With no supplies or replacements available from the United States, ground crews, with little or no spares for repairing aircraft, used parts which were cannibalized from wrecks. Essentials, such as oil, was reused, with used oil being strained through makeshift filters, and tailwheel tires were stuffed with rags to keep them usable. The aircraft which were flying and engaging the Japanese seemed to have more bullethole patches on the fuselage than original skin. On 12 December, Nichols Field was abandoned and the squadron operated from at temporary fields in northern Bataan, and later withdrawn on 8 January to "Bataan Field", located several miles from the southern tip of the peninsula.

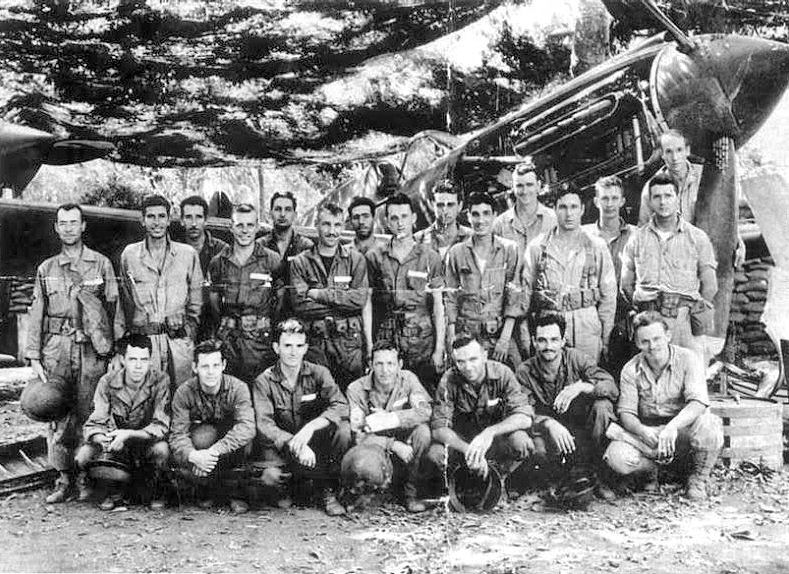
24th Pursuit Group Curtiss P-40E Warhawk Bataan Airfield 1942.

Bataan field consisted of a dirt runway, hacked out of the jungle by Army engineers in early 1941 and lengthened after the FEAF was ordered into Bataan. However, it was well camouflaged. It was attacked and strafed daily by the Japanese, however no aircraft were lost on the ground as a result of the attacks. Bataan Field was kept in operation for several months during the Battle of Bataan. The remaining pilots continued operations with the few planes that were left, cannibalizing aircraft wreckage to keep a few planes airborne in the early months of 1942. Many squadron members, unneeded to support the limited number of airplanes fought as infantry.

With the surrender of the United States Army on Bataan, Philippines on 8 April 1942, the remainder of the 24th Pursuit Group withdrew to Mindanao Island and began operating from Del Monte Airfield with whatever aircraft were remaining. Those remaining on Luzon that surrendered to the Japanese were subjected to the Bataan Death March.

The last of the group's aircraft were captured or destroyed by enemy forces on or about 1 May 1942. With the collapse of organized United States resistance in the Philippines on 8 May 1942, a few surviving members of the 3rd Pursuit Squadron managed to escape from Mindanao to Australia where they were integrated into existing units.

The unit was never remanned or equipped during the war. It was carried as an active unit until 2 April 1946.

=== Southeast Asia ===
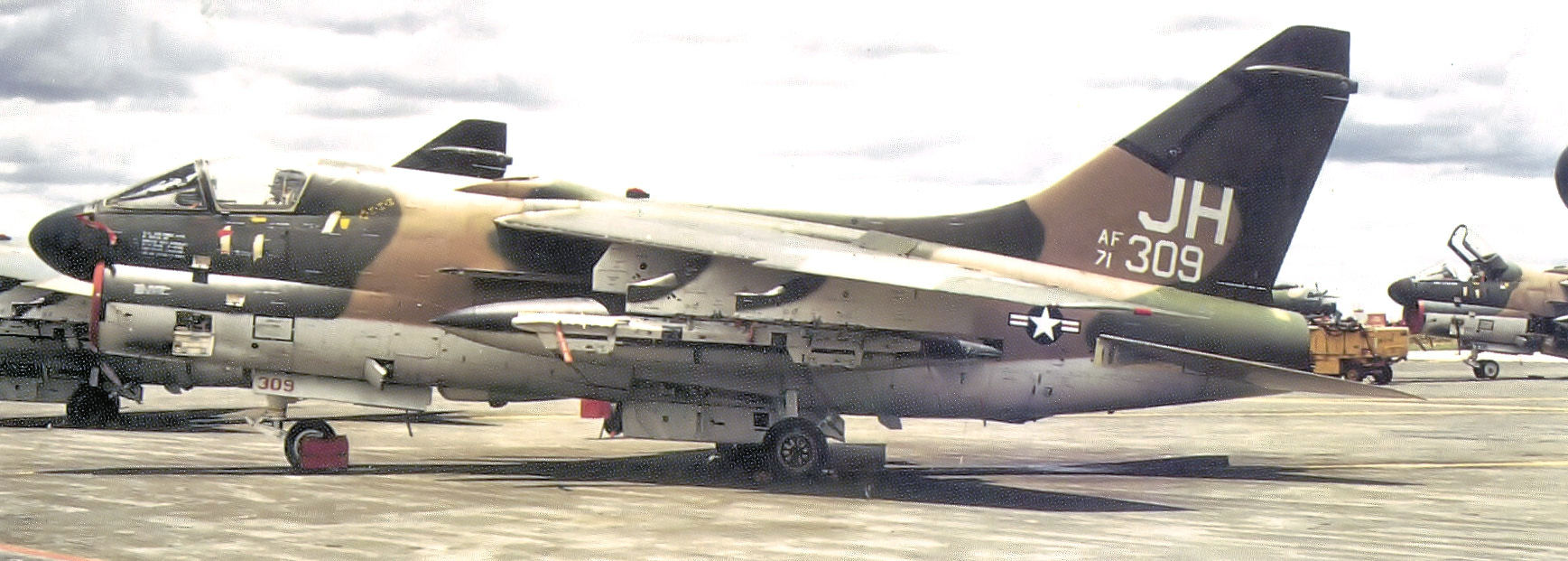
3rd Tactical Fighter Squadron A-7 Corsair (Note: Aircraft is A-7D-10-CV Corsair II serial 71-0309 at Korat Royal Thai Air Force Base in 1973. This plane was retired to AMARC as AE0206 15 September 1991.)

As a result of the successes of the A-7D Corsair II-equipped 354th Tactical Fighter Wing (Deployed) at Korat Royal Thai AFB, Thailand in the closing days of the Vietnam War, Headquarters, Pacific Air Forces requested the activation of a permanent A-7D squadron in Thailand. The Air Force, in turn, reactivated the 3rd as the 3rd Tactical Fighter Squadron at Korat on 15 March 1973, and the 354th transferred a squadron of its A-7Ds to the squadron, along with volunteer airmen who joined the host 388th Tactical Fighter Wing.

3rd TFS aircraft engaged in combat operations over Cambodia and Laos during the spring and summer of 1973, supporting friendly western governments in those nations against Communist aggression. A Congressional resolution mandated the end of United States combat over Indochina, effective 15 August 1973, and the 3rd TFS flew its last combat mission that date over Cambodia.

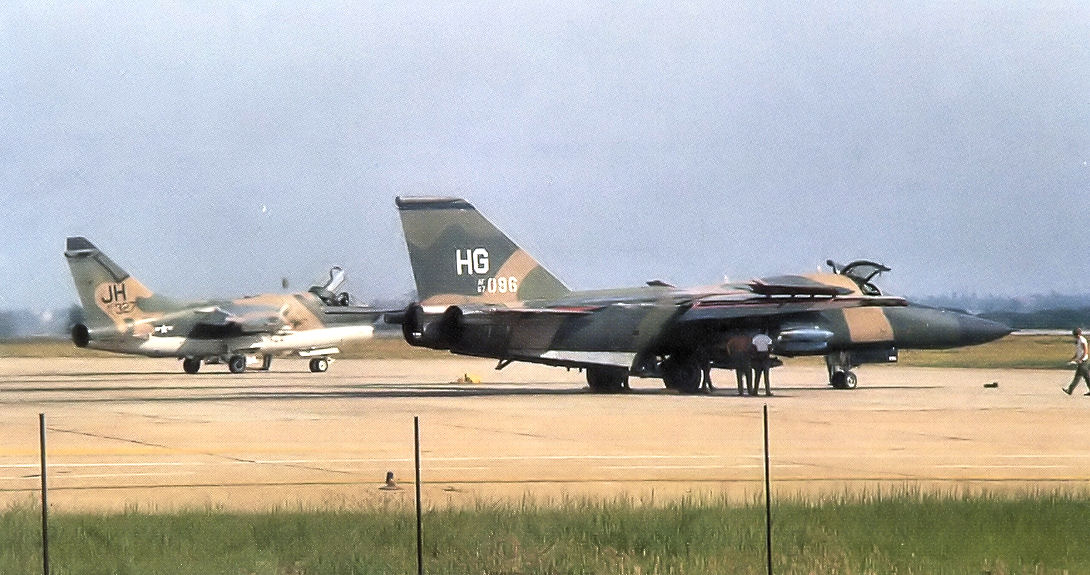
3rd Tactical Fighter Squadron A-7D (Note: Aircraft is LTV A-7D, serial 71-3027. 429th Tactical Fighter Squadron F-111A serial 67-0096 is also on the Korat Alert Ramp during the SS Mayaguez Operation in May 1975.)

With the end of active combat in Indochina, in March 1974, the 354th transferred several more aircraft to the 3rd TFS prior to its return to Myrtle Beach AFB. Squadron aircraft practiced bombing and intercept missions in western Thailand. A large exercise was held on the first Monday of every month, involving all USAF units in Thailand. "Commando Scrimmage" covered skills such as dog fighting, aerial refueling, airborne command posts and forward air controllers. These exercises were taken very seriously. The A-7D aircraft were pitted against the F-4 Phantom II aircraft in dissimilar air combat exercises. These missions were flown as a deterrent to the Communists in Vietnam as a signal that if the Paris Peace Accords were broken, the United States would use its airpower to enforce its provisions. The wars in Cambodia and Laos, however continued, and in the spring of 1975, Communist regimes took power in both of those nations.

3rd TFS A-7Ds along with other Thailand-based USAF aircraft provided air cover and escort during Operation Eagle Pull, the evacuation of Americans from Phnom Penh, Cambodia, and Operation Frequent Wind the evacuation of Americans and selected Vietnamese from Saigon, South Vietnam. On 14–15 May 1975, aircraft assigned to Korat (3rd TFS A-7D, 34th TFS F-4E, 428th TFS F-111A and 16th SOS AC-130) provided air cover in what is considered the last battle of the Vietnam war, the recovery of the SS Mayaguez after it was hijacked by the Cambodian Khmer Rouge communists.

=== 3rd Tactical Fighter Wing ===
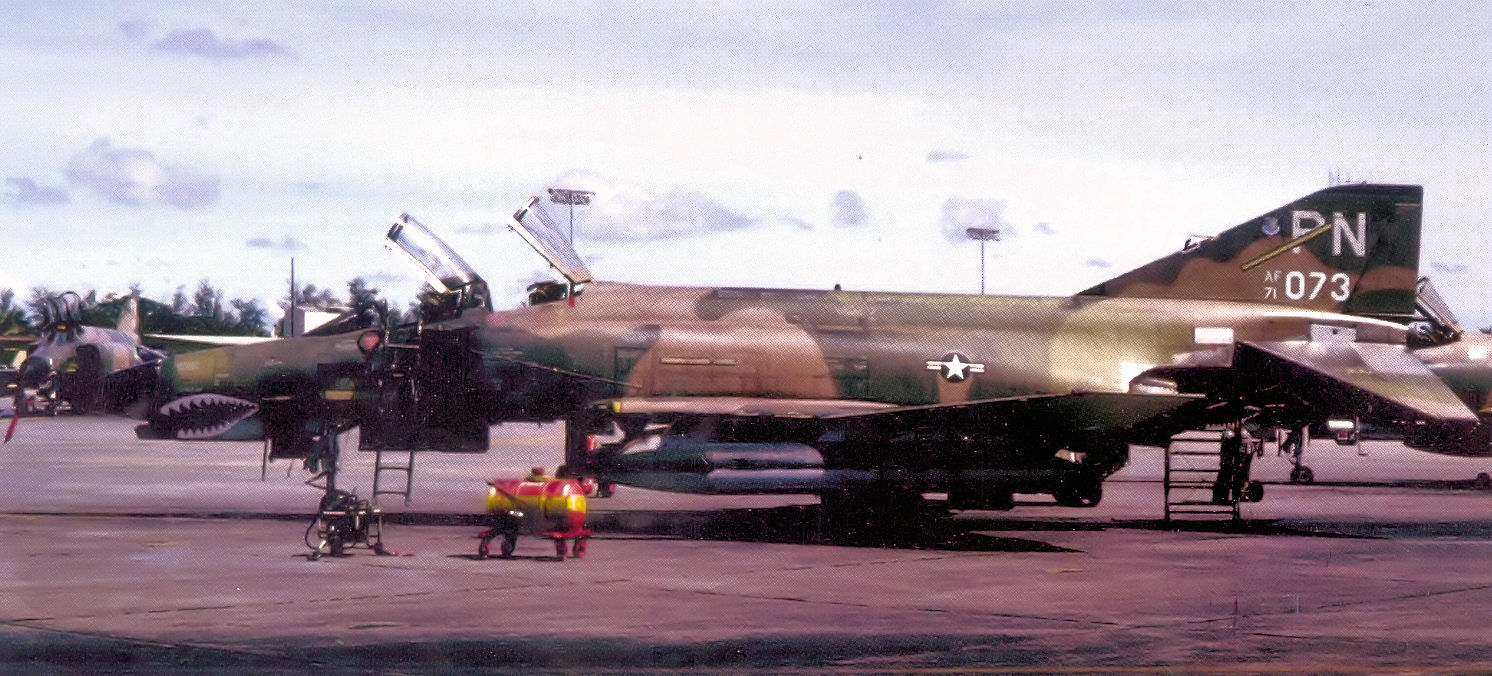
F-4E Phantom at Clark AB (Note: Aircraft is McDonnell Douglas F-4E-49-MC Phantom serial 71-1073, in 1976 1976. This plane was retired to AMARC as FP0649 5 April 1991. It was still on the AMARC inventory 15 January 2008.)

The USAF presence at Korat RTAFB ended in 1975, and on 15 December, the 3rd TFS was transferred to Clark Air Base, Philippines, replacing the 68th Tactical Fighter Squadron, which had been inactivated earlier. It was the first time the squadron had been assigned to the Philippines since the surrender of American forces on the islands in April 1942.

Upon its arrival at Clark, the A-7Ds were flown back to the United States to be transferred to the National Guard Bureau where they were reassigned to several Air National Guard squadrons. The 3rd was re-equipped with F-4E Phantom IIs that were transferred from other Thailand-based squadrons which were headed back to the United States. Throughout the late 1970s and the 1980s, the squadron deployed throughout the Pacific on exercises and supported the training requirements of other units.

=== Cope Thunder ===
The Mount Pinatubo eruption forced the 3rd TFW's hasty relocation to Elmendorf AFB, Alaska on 19 December 1991. The F-4Es of the 3rd TFS, however were retired and the squadron was transferred to Eielson AFB, Alaska without personnel or equipment, where it became part of the 343rd Wing. It was re-designated as the 3rd Fighter Training Squadron, and its mission became the administration of the COPE THUNDER arctic training program. It was equipped with UH-1N Huey helicopters for range support. It was inactivated on 20 August 1993 when the 354th Fighter Wing was moved to Eielson from the inactivated Myrtle Beach AFB, the personnel and equipment of the 3rd being re-designated as the 353rd Fighter Training Squadron. Ironically, it was the 363rd Tactical Fighter Squadron, deployed to Korat RTAFB, that transferred its A-7D Corsair IIs to the re-activated 3rd Tactical Fighter Squadron in March 1973 after decades of inactivation.

=== Air Education and Training Command ===
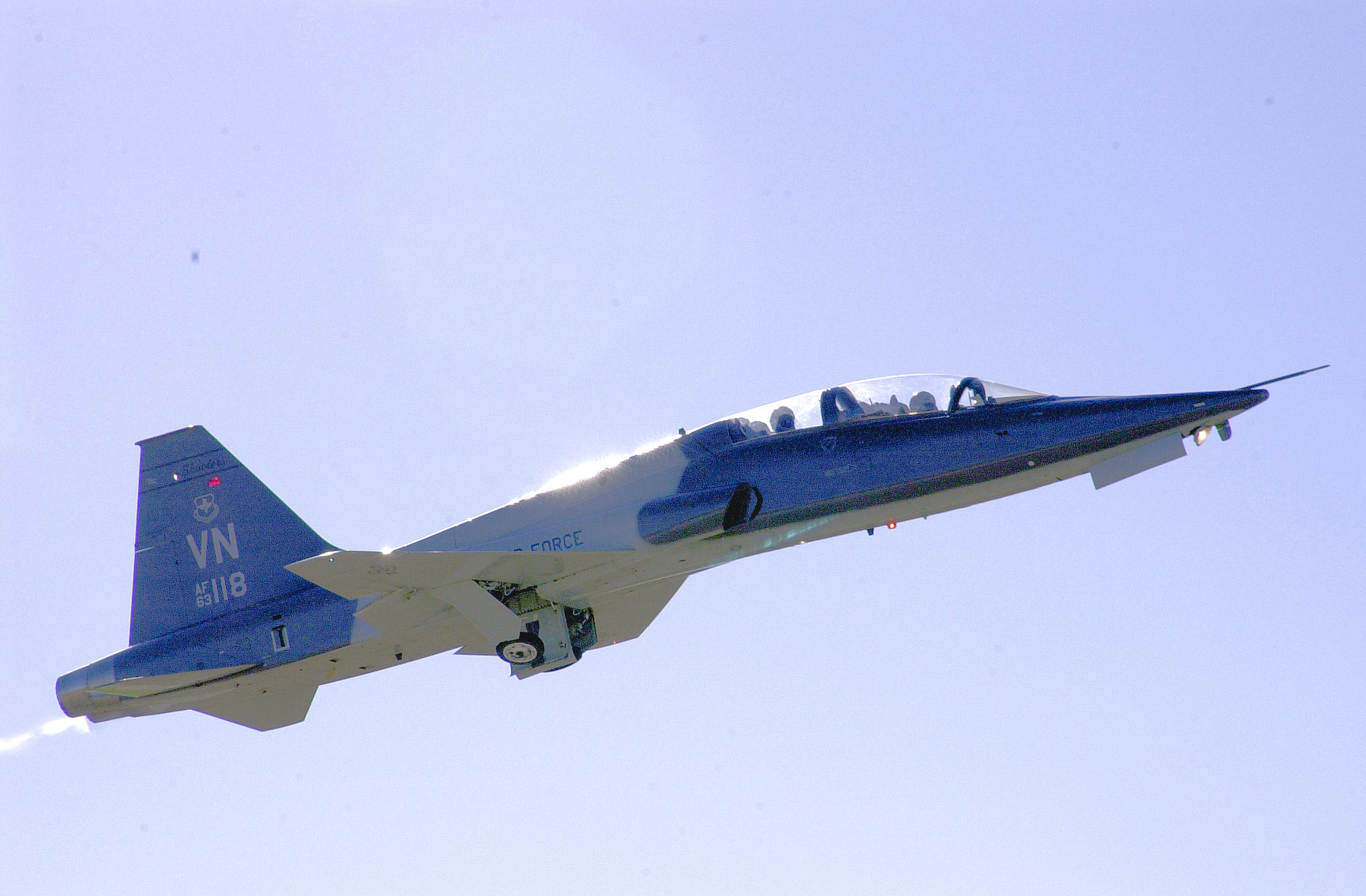
Squadron Northrop T-38A (Note: Aircraft is Northrop T-38A-50-NO Talon serial 63-8118.)

The 3rd Flying Training Squadron was reactivated on 1 April 1994 at Lackland Air Force Base, Texas. It was equipped with the Slingsby T-3A Firefly with a mission to conduct AETC's Enhanced Flight Screening Program. On 2 April 2001, it was transferred to Moody Air Force Base, Georgia where it became a T-6 Texan II primary flying training squadron as part of the 479th Flying Training Group. As a result of BRAC 2005, the 479th was inactivated on 21 July 2007. Its aircraft and equipment were redistributed to other AETC units.

The 3rd moved to Vance Air Force Base, Oklahoma later in April 2007 and was redesignated the 3rd Fighter Training Squadron to provide Introduction to Fighter Fundamentals training to fighter graduate students. The 3rd lost its IFF mission when the Air Force concentrated the training at three other bases in September 2011.

In September 2012, the 32d Flying Training Squadron was inactivated, and its T-1 Jayhawk training mission and personnel were taken over by the newly reactivated 3rd FTS at Vance in order to preserve the latter's heritage.

== Lineage ==
- Organized as the 3rd Aero Squadron on 1 November 1916

Redesignated as: Squadron A, Post Field on 22 July 1918
Demobilized on 2 January 1919
Reconstituted on 8 April 1924 and consolidated with 3rd Pursuit Squadron

- Organized as the 3rd Aero Squadron on 13 May 1919

Redesignated 3rd Squadron (Pursuit) on 14 March 1921
Redesignated 3rd Pursuit Squadron on 25 January 1923
Consolidated on 8 April 1924 with Squadron A, Post Field, Oklahoma
Redesignated 3rd Pursuit Squadron (Interceptor) on 6 December 1939
Inactivated on 2 April 1946

- Redesignated 3rd Tactical Fighter Squadron on 12 March 1973

Activated on 15 March 1973
Redesignated 3rd Fighter Training Squadron on 19 December 1991
Inactivated on 20 August 1993

- Redesignated 3rd Flying Training Squadron on 14 February 1994

Activated on 1 April 1994
Inactivated on 7 April 2000

- Activated on 2 April 2001

Redesignated 3rd Fighter Training Squadron on 8 May 2007
Inactivated c. September 2011

- Redesignated 3rd Flying Training Squadron on 14 September 2012

Inactivated 31 August 2026

=== Assignments ===
- Post Headquarters, Fort Sam Houston, 1 November 1916
- Post Headquarters, Kelly Field, May 1917
- Post Headquarters, Fort Sill, 30 August 1917
- Post Headquarters, Post Field, November 1917-2 January 1919
- Eastern Department, 13 May 1919

Attached to Post Headquarters, Mitchel Field

- Philippine Department, 18 August 1919
- 1st Observation (later, 4th Observation, 4th Composite) Group, 10 March 1920
- 24th Pursuit Group, 1 October 1941 – 2 April 1946
- 388th Tactical Fighter Wing, 15 March 1973
- 3rd Tactical Fighter Wing (later 3rd Wing), 15 December 1975

Attached to Thirteenth Air Force, 15–16 December 1975

- 343rd Wing, 19 Dec 1991
- 343rd Operations Group, 1 February 1992 – 20 August 1993
- 12th Operations Group, 1 April 1994 – 7 April 2000
- 479th Flying Training Group, 2 April 2001
- 71st Operations Group, 26 April 2007 – c. 30 September 2011, c. 14 September 2012–present

=== Stations ===
- Fort Sam Houston, Texas, 1 November 1916
- South San Antonio, Texas, May 1917
- Fort Sill, Oklahoma, 30 August 1917
- Post Field, Oklahoma, November 1917 - 2 January 1919
- Mitchel Field, New York, 13 May 1919
- Hazelhurst Field, New York, 29 May 1919 – 28 June 1919
- Manila, Luzon, Philippines, 18 August 1919
- Camp Stotsenburg, Luzon, Philippines, 2 December 1919
- Clark Field, Luzon, Philippines, 15 October 1920
- Nichols Field, Luzon, Philippines, 16 June 1938
- Iba Airfield, Luzon, Philippines, c. 1 September 1941
- Nichols Field, Luzon, Philippines, 9 December 1941
- Ternate NAS, Luzon, Philippines, c. 12 December 1941

Operated from Del Carmen Airfield, Luzon, Philippines, 12-c. 25 December 1941

- Bataan Airfield, Luzon, Philippines, c. 25 December 1941 – April 1942

Operated from Del Monte Airfield, Mindanao, Philippines, c. 8 April–May 1942

- Korat Royal Thai Air Force Base, Thailand, 15 March 1973
- Clark Air Base, Philippines, 15 December 1975 – 19 December 1991
- Eielson Air Force Base, Alaska, 19 December 1991 – 20 August 1993
- Lackland Air Force Base, Texas, 1 April 1994 – 7 April 2000
- Moody Air Force Base, Georgia, 2 April 2001
- Vance Air Force Base, Oklahoma, 26 April July 2007 – c. 30 September 2011, c. 14 September 2012–present

=== Aircraft ===
- R-4 (1917–1919)
- JN-4 Jenny (1917–1919)
- JN-6 Jenny (1917–1919)
- DH-4 (1919–1931)
- MB-3 (1923–1926)
- PW-9 (1926–1931)
- P-12 (1930–1937)
- O-2 (1931–1937)
- O-19 (1931–1937)
- P-26 Peashooter (1937–1941)
- P-35 Guardsman (1941)
- P-40 Warhawk (1941–1942)
- A-7 Corsair II (1973–1975)
- F-4 Phantom II (1975–1991)
- UH-1 Iroquois (1991–1993)
- T-3 Firefly (1994–2000)
- T-6 Texan II (2001–2007)
- T-38 Talon (2007–2011)
- T-1A Jayhawk (2012–present)

== Commanders ==
- Capt Charles T. Phillips, Mar 1921
- 1Lt Raphael Baez, Aug 1921
- Maj Adlai H. Gilkeson, 22 Oct 1921
- Maj John C. McDonnell, 19 Oct 1923
- Capt Earl H. DeFord, 10 Jul 1925
- 1Lt Frederick von H. Kimbel, 6 May 1926
- Maj Leo A. Walton, 23 Sep 1926
- Capt Lawrence P. Hickey, 18 May 1928
- Maj Ralph P. Cousins, 1 Jul 1928
- Maj John B. Brooks, 27 Jun 1930
- Capt Aubrey Hornsby, 15 May 1931
- Capt Leland R. Hewitt, 16 May 1932
- Maj Gerald E. Brower, 17 Oct 1932
- Maj Christopher W. Ford, 18 Aug 1935
- Maj Lloyd Barnett, 3 Mar 1937
- Capt Norris B. Harbold, 16 Jun 1938
- Capt Alden R. Crawford, 1 Jun 1939
- Unknown, Sep 1939
- Maj Robert Patterson, Apr 1941
- Maj William H. Maverick, 9 May 1941
- Capt Benjamin Putnam, 27 Aug 1941
- Capt William K. Horrigan, 29 Aug 1941
- 1Lt Henry G. Thorne 31 Oct 1941

Source: by Clay, Steven E., US Army Order of Battle 1919–1941 - Volume 3: The Services: Air Service, Engineers, and Special Troops, 1919–41

== See also ==
- List of American Aero Squadrons
