= 8th Flying Training Squadron =

United States Air Force unit

8th Flying Training Squadron

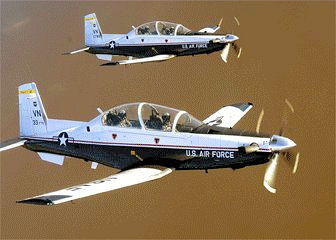
- T-6 Texan IIs from Vance AFB
- Active: 1942–1951; 1972–present
- Country: United States
- Branch: United States Air Force
- Role: Pilot Training
- Part of: Air Education and Training Command
- Garrison/HQ: Vance Air Force Base
- Engagements: Southwest Pacific Theater
- Decorations: Distinguished Unit Citation; Air Force Outstanding Unit Award; Philippine Presidential Unit Citation; Republic of Korea Presidential Unit Citation

Commanders
- Current commander: LtCol Deirdre Gurry

Insignia
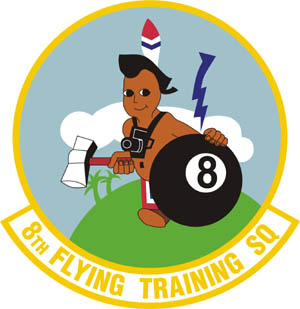
- 8th Flying Training Squadron emblem (Note: Approved 28 July 1990.) (Note: This emblem was based on the World War II emblem that apparently never received official approval. Maurer, pp. 48-49, cf. Endicott, p. 394.)

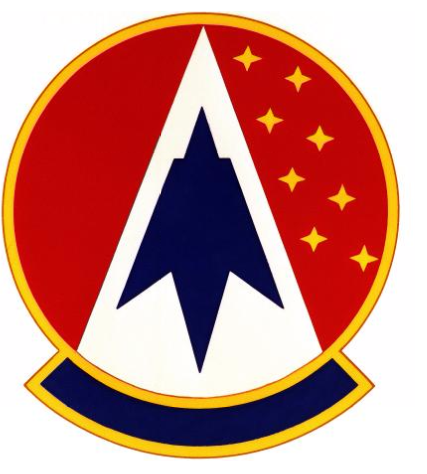
- 8th Flying Training Squadron emblem (Note: Approved 2 January 1973.)

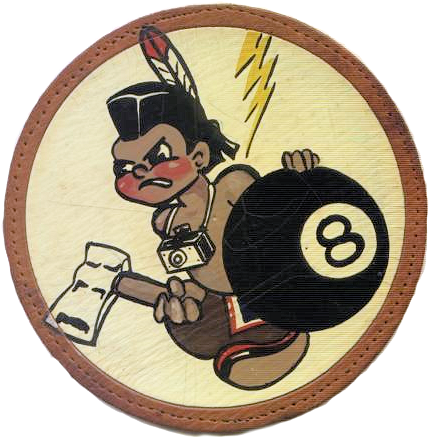
- 8th Photographic Reconnaissance Squadron emblem

The 8th Flying Training Squadron is part of the 71st Flying Training Wing based at Vance Air Force Base, Oklahoma. It operated during World War II and the Korean War, was inactivated in 1951, and reactivated in 1972. It currently conducts flight training using T-6A Texan II aircraft.

== Mission ==
Performs Joint Specialized Undergraduate Pilot Training with T-6A Texan II trainers.

== History ==
=== World War II ===
Activated in early 1942 under Fourth Air Force; after a brief organizational period in Southern California where it was equipped with reconnaissance P-38 Lightnings (F-4) it deployed to the Southwest Pacific Area, being assigned to Fifth Air Force in Australia.

Engaged in long-range tactical reconnaissance missions over New Guinea; later the Netherlands East Indies and in late 1944, over the Philippines in support of MacArthur's Island-Hopping campaign (1942–1945). After the Japanese capitulation in August 1945, became part of the Army of Occupation in Japan. It was not operational between April 1946 and July 1947.

=== Korean War ===
From 1947 to 1949 flew photographic mapping missions over Japan, Korea, Philippines and other areas of western Pacific. During the Korean War, the squadron flew tactical reconnaissance sorties over North and South Korea from, 29 June 1950 – 24 February 1951.

=== Flying training ===
The 8th has conducted undergraduate pilot training for active duty, Air National Guard, Air Force Reserve and selected foreign allies since 1 November 1972. Since the mid-1990s, the squadron has also conducted joint primary flight training for selected US Navy and US Marine Corps student naval aviators, with command of the squadron alternating between Air Force officers in the rank of lieutenant colonel and Navy officers in the ranks of commander.

== Lineage ==
- Constituted as the 8th Photographic Squadron on 19 Jan 1942

Activated 1 Feb 1942
Redesignated 8th Photographic Reconnaissance Squadron on 9 Jun 1942
Redesignated 8th Photographic Squadron (Light) on 6 Feb 1943
Redesignated 8th Photographic Reconnaissance Squadron on 13 Nov 1943
Redesignated 8th Tactical Reconnaissance Squadron, Night Photographic on 10 Aug 1948
Redesignated 8th Tactical Reconnaissance Squadron, Photo-Jet on 1 Aug 1949
Inactivated on 25 Feb 1951
Redesignated 8th Flying Training Squadron on 14 Apr 1972
Activated on 1 Nov 1972

=== Assignments ===
- IV Air Support Command, 1 Feb 1942
- Fifth Air Force, 29 Mar 1942 (attached to Allied Air Forces, Apr – Sep 1942)
- V Bomber Command, 5 Sep 1942
- 6th Photographic Group (later 6th Reconnaissance Group), 13 Nov 1943 (attached to V Bomber Command after c. 10 Dec 1945)
- V Bomber Command, 27 Apr 1946
- 314th Composite Wing, 31 May 1946
- 71st Reconnaissance Group (later 71st Tactical Reconnaissance Group), 28 Feb 1947 (attached to 314th Composite Wing until Nov 1947)
- Fifth Air Force, 1 Apr 1949
- 543d Tactical Support Group, 26 Sep 1950 – 25 Feb 1951
- 71st Flying Training Wing, 1 Nov 1972
- 71st Operations Group, 15 Dec 1991 – present

=== Stations ===
- March Field, California, 1 Feb – 14 Mar 1942

Two flights remained at March Field, CA, to 16 Jun 1942

- Essendon Airport, Melbourne, Australia, 7 Apr 1942
- Archerfield Airport (Brisbane), Australia, 24 Apr 1942
- Charters Towers Airfield, Australia, 2 May 1942
- Kila Airfield (3 Mile Drome), Port Moresby, New Guinea, 9 Sep 1942
- Nadzab Airfield, New Guinea, 16 Mar 1944

Operated from Biak after c. 11 Aug 1944

- Mokmer Airfield, Biak, 10 Sep – 20 Oct 1944
- Dulag Airfield, Leyte, Philippines, 4 Nov 1944

Air Echelon assigned to Clark Field, Luzon, Philippines, 19 May – 12 Aug 1945

- Motobu Airfield, Okinawa, 21 Jul 1945
- Chōfu Airfield, Japan, 28 Sep 1945
- Irumagawa Air Base, Japan, 25 Jan 1946
- Yokota Air Base, Japan, 25 Mar 1949

Detachment operated from Itazuke Air Base, Japan, from 29 Jun 1950

- Itazuke Air Base, Japan, 9 Jul 1950
- Taegu Air Base (K-2), South Korea, 2 Oct 1950
- Komaki Air Base, Japan

Operated from Taegu Air Base (K-2), South Korea, 26 Jan – 25 Feb 1951

- Vance Air Force Base, Oklahoma, 1 Nov 1972 – present

=== Aircraft ===
- Lockheed F-4 Lightning (1942–1944)
- Lockheed F-5 Lightning (1943–1946)
- Boeing B-17 Flying Fortress (1942–1943)
- Martin B-26 Marauder (1943–1944)
- North American F-6 Mustang (1946)
- North American P-51 Mustang (1946)
- Northrop P-61 Black Widow (1946)
- Northrop F-15A/RF-61C Reporter (1947–1949)
- Lockheed RF-80 Shooting Star (1949–1951)
- Cessna T-37 Tweet (1972–2006)
- Beechcraft T-6 Texan II (2006 – present)

=== Notable members ===
- Jeffrey B. Cashman, future Brigadier General.
- Fred Hargesheimer, pilot turned philanthropist to those who saved his life after he was shot down.
- James P. Ulm, future Brigadier General.
