= 25th Flying Training Squadron =

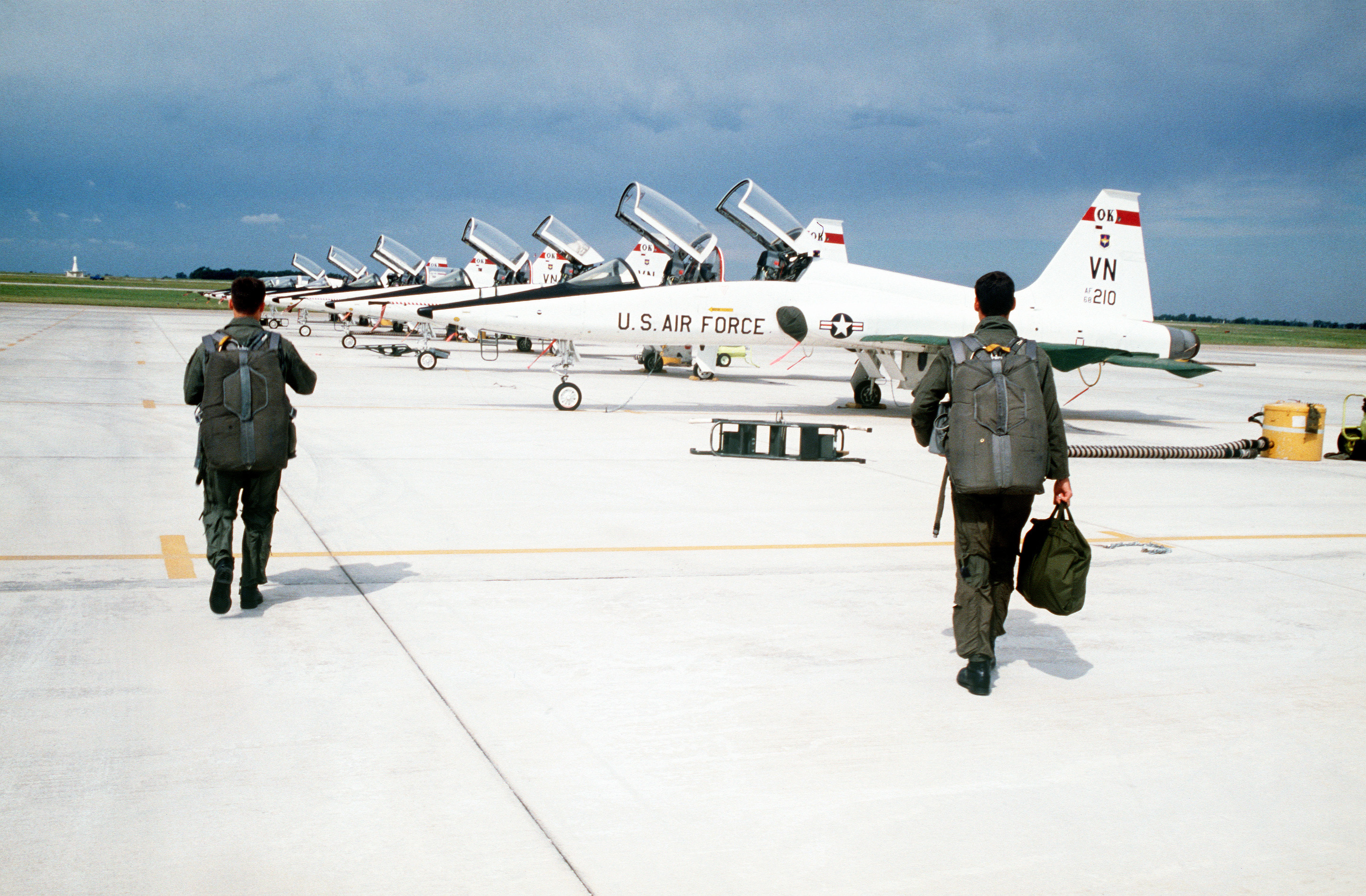
- Squadron instructor pilot and student walk towards T-38A Talons to begin flight training at Vance AFB (Note: Aircraft is Northrop T-38A-75-NO Talon serial 68-8210. This aircraft visible was later converted to an T-38C.)
- Active: 1943–1949; 1955–1957; 1972–present
- Country: United States
- Branch: United States Air Force
- Role: Pilot Training
- Part of: Air Education and Training Command
- Garrison/HQ: Vance Air Force Base
- Engagements: Southwest Pacific Theater
- Decorations: Distinguished Unit Citation; Air Force Outstanding Unit Award; Philippine Presidential Unit Citation

Insignia
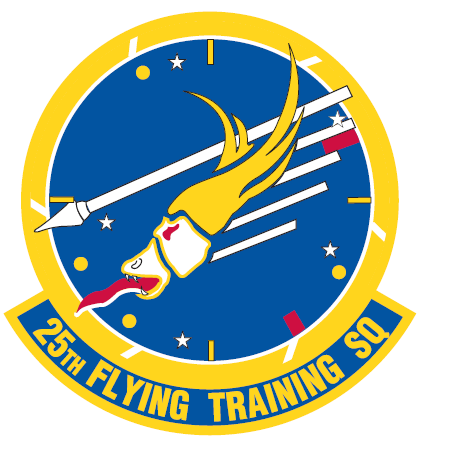
- 25 Flying Training Sq emblem (modified and reinstated 31 March 1995)

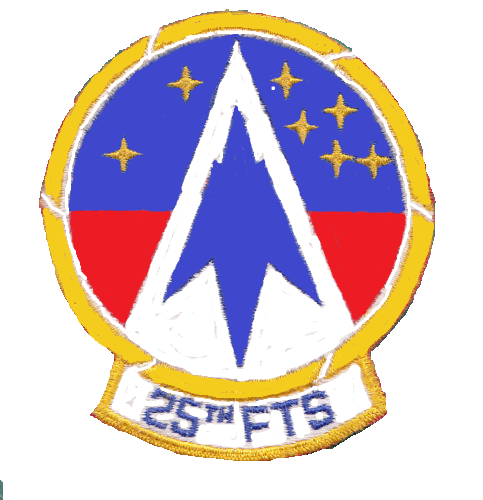
- 25th Flying Training Squadron emblem (approved 2 January 1973)

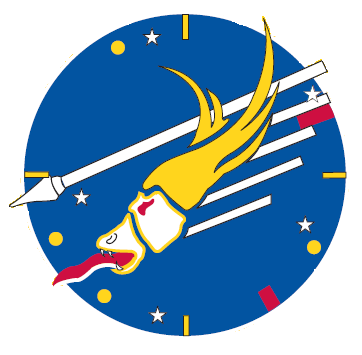
- 25th Photographic Reconnaissance Sq emblem (approved 13 May 1944)

The 25th Flying Training Squadron is part of the 71st Flying Training Wing based at Vance Air Force Base, Oklahoma. It operates Northrop T-38 Talon aircraft conducting flight training.

== Overview ==
The squadron has provided Undergraduate Pilot Training (UPT) for active duty, Air National Guard, Air Force Reserve, and selected foreign allies since 1 November 1972.

== History ==
The 25th flew combat reconnaissance missions in the Southwest and Western Pacific from, 5 February 1944 – 14 August 1945. It was active but not operationally manned or equipped from, November 1945 – February 1946. The squadron also conducted photographic reconnaissance in western United States between 1955 and 1957.

== Lineage ==
- Constituted as the 25th Photographic Reconnaissance Squadron on 5 February 1943

Redesignated 25th Photographic Squadron (Light) on 6 February 1943
Activated on 9 February 1943
Redesignated 25th Photographic Reconnaissance Squadron on 11 August 1943
Redesignated 25th Tactical Reconnaissance Squadron on 24 January 1946
Inactivated on 1 April 1949

- Redesignated 25th Strategic Reconnaissance Squadron, Fighter on 4 November 1954

Activated on 24 January 1955
Inactivated on 1 July 1957

- Redesignated 25th Flying Training Squadron on 14 April 1972

Activated on 1 November 1972

=== Assignments ===
- 6th Photographic Group (later 6th Photographic Reconnaissance and Mapping Group, 6th Photographic Reconnaissance Group 6th Photographic Group 6th Reconnaissance Group) Group, 9 February 1943 (attached to V Fighter Command after 10 February 1946)
- V Fighter Command, 27 April 1946
- 315th Composite Wing, 31 May 1946
- 71st Reconnaissance Group (later 71st Tactical Reconnaissance Group), 28 February 1947 – 1 April 1949 (attached to 315th Composite Wing until November 1947)
- 71st Strategic Reconnaissance Wing, 24 January 1955 – 1 July 1957
- 71st Flying Training Wing, 1 November 1972
- 71st Operations Group, 15 December 1991 – present

=== Stations ===
- Colorado Springs Army Air Base, Colorado, 9 February – 22 October 1943
- Sydney Airport, Australia, 19 November 1943
- Archerfield Airport, Brisbane, Australia, 25 November 1943 – 19 January 1944
- Lae Airfield, New Guinea, 3 February 1944
- Nadzab Airfield Complex, New Guinea, 7 February 1944
- Mokmer Airfield, Biak, Netherlands East Indies, 23 July – 16 November 1944
- Dulag Airfield, Leyte, Philippines, 24 November 1944
- San Jose Airfield, Mindoro, Philippines, 3 January 1944

Detachment at Dulag Airfield, Leyte, Philippines, to 6 February 1945
Air echelon at Clark Field, Luzon, Philippines, 14 June – 14 July 1945

- Motobu Airfield, Okinawa, 9 July 1945
- Chofu Airfield, Japan, 27 September 1945
- Itazuke Air Base, Japan, 10 February 1946
- Itami Airfield, Japan, 30 March 1946 – 1 April 1949
- Larson Air Force Base, Washington, 24 January 1955 – 1 July 1957
- Vance Air Force Base, Oklahoma, 1 November 1972 – present

=== Aircraft ===
- Lockheed F-5 Lightning (1943–1945)
- North American B-25 Mitchell (1944)
- North American F-6 Mustang (1946–1949)
- Stinson L-5 Sentinel (1946)
- Beechcraft F-2 Expeditor (1947–1948)
- Republic RF-84F Thunderflash (1955–1957)
- Northrop T-38 Talon (1972–present)
