= William A. Shomo =

United States Army Air Forces Medal of Honor recipient

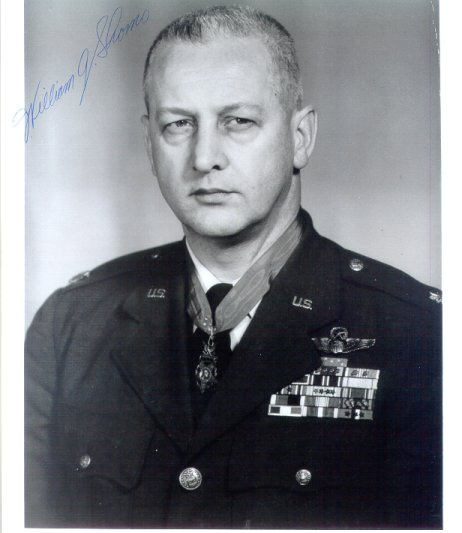
- Born: May 30, 1918; Jeannette, Pennsylvania, US
- Died: June 25, 1990 (aged 72); Pittsburgh, Pennsylvania, US
- Burial place: St. Clair Cemetery, Greensburg, Pennsylvania, US
- Military career
- Allegiance: United States
- Branch: United States Army Air Forces; United States Air Force
- Service years: 1941–1968
- Rank: Lieutenant Colonel
- Units: 82d Tactical Reconnaissance Squadron; 71st Reconnaissance Group
- Commands: 14th Fighter-Interceptor Squadron; 59th Fighter-Interceptor Squadron; 54th Fighter Group
- Conflicts: World War II
- Awards: Medal of Honor

William Arthur Shomo (May 30, 1918 – June 25, 1990) was a United States Army Air Forces fighter pilot during World War II. He is credited with eight victories during the conflict. Seven of these occurred during a single mission while flying a reconnaissance version of the P-51 Mustang, for which he received the Medal of Honor.

== Early life ==
Shomo was born on May 30, 1918, in Jeannette, Pennsylvania, to George Washington Shomo and Bertha May (née Uncapher) Shomo. He attended the Cincinnati College of Embalming and the Pittsburgh School of Embalming between 1937 and 1940, and then he worked as a mortician for a short time before enlisting in the Aviation Cadet Program of the United States Army Air Forces on August 18, 1941. His father's family was from the Johnstown, Pennsylvania, area and, prior to his father's birth, were survivors of the 1889 Johnstown Flood with his uncle, Adam Franklin "Frank" Shomo, being the last known living survivor of the flood.

== Military service ==
Shomo joined the United States Army Air Corps from Pittsburgh, Pennsylvania, in August 1941.

For over a year, Shomo was assigned to the 82nd Tactical Reconnaissance Squadron. His unit had moved from airstrip to airstrip along the northern coast of New Guinea and then to Morotai supporting General MacArthur's drive to the Philippines performing dangerous photo recon and ground attack missions. His squadron was equipped with older P-39 Airacobras and Curtiss P-40s, which were adequate for the photo recon/ground attack role, but too short-ranged to reach areas where they might encounter Japanese aircraft.

In December 1944, the squadron was given F-6Ds; P-51 Mustangs designed for armed photo reconnaissance. On 24 December, Shomo was put in command of the squadron and ordered to move it to Mindoro, an island off the southwest coast of Luzon, to support MacArthur's landing at Lingayen Gulf. During that landing on January 9, Shomo led his first combat mission in the squadron's new planes. The low-level reconnaissance was to gather intelligence on the air strength of Japanese in northern Luzon. They approached the Japanese airfield at Tuguegarao, where he scored his first air victory, an Aichi D3A "Val" dive bomber coming in on its final approach.

Shomo had been in the undertaker business before the war. He named all his aircraft "Snooks" (plus the appropriate numeral) to note this. The F-6D in which he won his Medal of Honor was "Snooks 5"; this aircraft was later lost while being flown by another pilot. The next F-6D was briefly "Snooks 6" but was changed to "The Flying Undertaker". Though Shomo flew more than 200 combat missions in World War II, he saw only a total of 14 enemy aircraft from his cockpit and destroyed eight of them.

=== Medal of Honor action ===
Two days after his first victory, on January 11, 1945, Captain Shomo and his wingman, Lieutenant Paul Lipscomb, were heading north for the Japanese airfields at Tuguegarao, Aparri, and Laoag, when they saw several enemy planes flying south at about 2,500 feet (760 m). Despite being outnumbered, they immediately pulled Immelman turns and found themselves behind 11 Kawasaki Ki-61 "Tonys" and one Nakajima Ki-44 "Tojo" escorting a Mitsubishi G4M "Betty" bomber.

On their first pass through the formation, Shomo closed to less than 40 yards (37 m) before opening fire. He shot down four Tonys, then came up under the bomber, firing into its belly. The bomber caught fire and began to lose altitude as its pilot attempted to crash-land the plane. Two of the Tonys escorting the bomber stayed with it as it went down. Shomo pulled up in a tight vertical spiral to gain altitude while the Tojo turned to engage him. The Japanese fighter fired until it stalled and slipped into the clouds. The Betty exploded as it bellied in, and the two escorting Tonys broke away, staying low. Shomo made a second diving pass at the two Tonys and downed them both. In under six minutes, Shomo had shot down seven enemy planes, becoming an "ace in one day." Meanwhile, his wingman shot down three of the remaining six planes. The three other Japanese planes fled.

By April 1, 1945, Shomo had been promoted to major and was awarded the Medal of Honor for leading an attack against heavy odds and destroying seven enemy aircraft.

== Postwar life ==
He would stay with the Air Force after the war and was promoted to lieutenant colonel on 20 February 1951. He then was assigned to Colorado and served in operations and training assignments for a year. In March 1952, he became Executive, Commander and Administrative Officer for the 175th Fighter Interceptor Squadron (FIS) at Rapid City Air Force Base (AFB), South Dakota. He directed combat operations at Headquarters 31st Air Division in St. Paul, Minnesota for about a year, and then became Commander of the 14th FIS at Sioux City, Iowa. He also commanded a similar squadron, the 59th FIS, at Goose Bay, Labrador in January 1955, and that June, led the squadron to victory in the Northeast Air Command Rocket Meet.

Lieutenant Colonel Shomo next became Commander of Headquarters, 473rd Air Defense Group and in July 1957 took over the 54th Fighter Group at the Greater Pittsburgh Airport. In January 1958, he became Executive Officer for HQ 79th Fighter Group at Youngstown Municipal Airport in Ohio. His last assignment was at Thule AFB, Greenland, with the 4683rd Air Defense Wing, before retiring in 1968.

Shomo died on 25 June 1990 and is buried in St. Clair Cemetery in Greensburg, Pennsylvania.

== Medal of Honor citation ==
SHOMO, WILLIAM A.

Maj. Shomo was lead pilot of a flight of 2 fighter planes charged with an armed photographic and strafing mission against the Aparri and Laoag airdromes. While en route to the objective, he observed an enemy twin engine bomber, protected by 12 fighters, flying about 2,500 feet above him and in the opposite direction Although the odds were 13 to 2, Maj. Shomo immediately ordered an attack. Accompanied by his wingman he closed on the enemy formation in a climbing turn and scored hits on the leading plane of the third element, which exploded in midair. Maj. Shomo then attacked the second element from the left side of the formation and shot another fighter down in flames. When the enemy formed for Counterattack, Maj. Shomo moved to the other side of the formation and hit a third fighter which exploded and fell. Diving below the bomber he put a burst into its underside and it crashed and burned. Pulling up from this pass he encountered a fifth plane firing head on and destroyed it. He next dived upon the first element and shot down the lead plane; then diving to 300 feet in pursuit of another fighter he caught it with his initial burst and it crashed in flames. During this action his wingman had shot down 3 planes, while the 3 remaining enemy fighters had fled into a cloudbank and escaped. Maj. Shomo's extraordinary gallantry and intrepidity in attacking such a far superior force and destroying 7 enemy aircraft in one action is unparalleled in the southwest Pacific area.

== See also ==
- List of Medal of Honor recipients
