= 71st Operations Group =

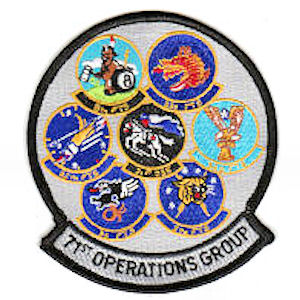
- Gaggle patch of 71st Operations Group squadrons
- Active: 1941–1946; 1947–1949; 1991–present
- Country: United States
- Branch: United States Air Force

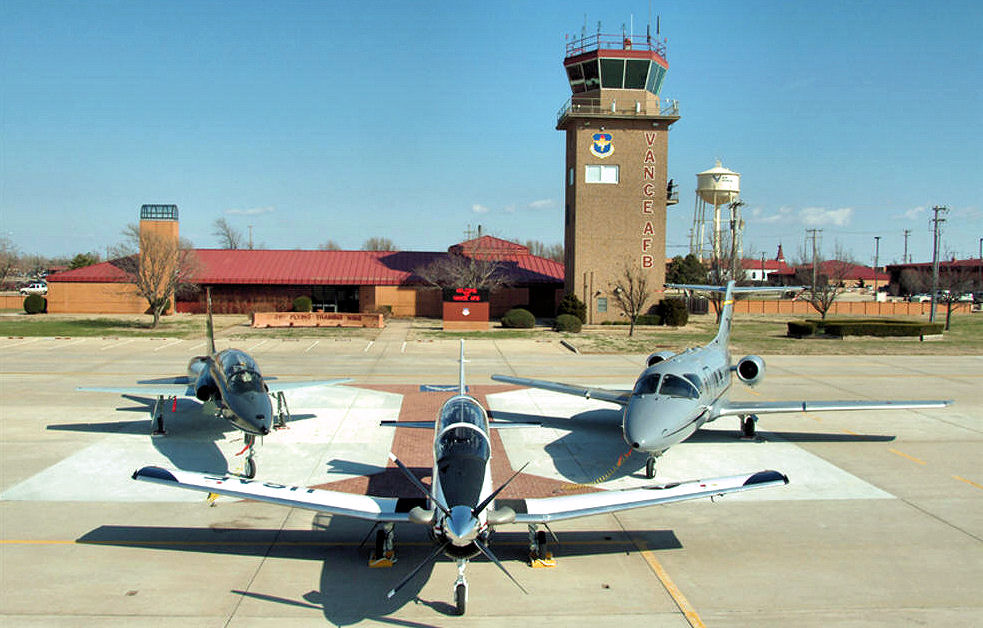
Aircraft of the 71st Operations Group. From left: A T-38 Talon, T-6A Texan II, and a T-1 Jayhawk are posed in front of the base control tower on the Vance flightline.

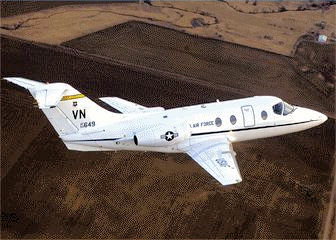
T-1 Jayhawk, 3d FTS

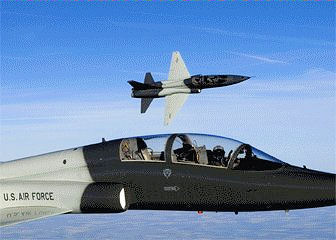
T-38 Talons, 25th FTS

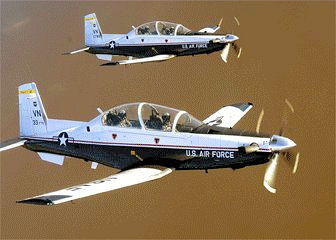
T-6A Texan II, 8th FTS

The 71st Operations Group (71 OG) is the operational flying component of the United States Air Force 71st Flying Training Wing. It is stationed at Vance Air Force Base, Oklahoma.

The group's World War II predecessor unit, the 71st Reconnaissance Group operated primarily in the Southwest Pacific Theater flying reconnaissance missions over New Guinea, New Britain, and the Admiralty Islands to provide target and damage-assessment photographs for air force units, It also bombed and strafed Japanese installation and shipping, supported Allied forces on New Guinea and Biak, flew courier missions, participated in rescue operations, and hauled passengers and cargo. The group moved to the Philippines in November 1944 and flew reconnaissance missions over Luzon to provide information for US forces on Japanese troops movements, gun positions, and supply routes. It was awarded the Philippine Presidential Unit Citation for its role in the liberation of the Philippines during 1944–1945. During the postwar years, the unit remained in the Far East and photographed areas of Japan and South Korea, which in 1950, provided much of the initial intelligence of the area when the Korean War broke out.

Major William A. Shomo of the 71st Reconnaissance Group awarded the Medal of Honor for his actions on 11 January 1945 sighting a formation of thirteen Japanese aircraft while leading 3 two-plane flight, Maj. Shomo attacked the superior enemy force and destroyed seven planes.

== Overview ==
The 71 OG conducts joint specialized undergraduate pilot training for over 410 U.S. Air Force, Navy, Marine Corps, and allied student pilots each year. The group utilizes over 200 T-6, T-1, T-38, and A T-38 aircraft, flies more than 55,000 sorties annually, and logs over 81,000 flying hours each year.

- 3rd Flying Training Squadron, T-1 Jayhawk
- 5th Flying Training Squadron, T-6A Texan II, T-1 Jayhawk, and T-38 Talon
- 8th Flying Training Squadron, T-6A Texan II
- 25th Flying Training Squadron, T-38 Talon
- 33rd Flying Training Squadron, T-6A Texan II
- 71st Operations Support Squadron

== History ==
For additional lineage and history, see 71st Flying Training Wing

The 71st Observation Group trained with B-25, P-38, and P-40 aircraft beginning in October 1941. It moved to California in December 1941 and flew antisubmarine patrols off the west coast, then moved to the Southwest Pacific in the fall of 1943 and flew reconnaissance missions over New Britain, New Guinea, and the Admiralty Islands from bases in New Guinea and Biak. It also flew combat mission against Japanese installations, airfields, and shipping, while supporting Allied ground forces on New Guinea and Biak. During that time, it flew courier missions, participated in rescue operations, and hauled passengers and cargo. From November 1944, the group flew reconnaissance missions over Luzon, supported ground forces, photographed and bombed airfields in Formosa and China, and attacked enemy shipping in the South China Sea.

Maj William A. Shomo earned the Congressional Medal of Honor for shooting down seven enemy aircraft on 11 January 1945. From Ie Shima in August 1945, the 71st attacked transportation targets on Kyushu and flew reconnaissance missions over southern Japan.

From February 1947 to August 1948, the group, equipped with reconnaissance aircraft, flew aerial photographing missions over Japan and southern Korea.

In December 1991, the 71st Operations Group assumed operational control over the 71st Flying Training Wing's T-37, T-38, and later T-1A aircraft, and provided undergraduate pilot training for USAF, Air National Guard, Air Force Reserve, and allied countries. The group provided initial flight training, and follow-on training for fighter, bomber and airlift/tanker aircraft.

=== Lineage ===
- Established as 71st Observation Group on 21 August 1941

Activated on 1 October 1941
Redesignated: 71st Reconnaissance Group on 2 April 1943
Redesignated: 71st Tactical Reconnaissance Group on 10 May 1944
Redesignated: 71st Reconnaissance Group on 20 May 1945
Inactivated on 1 February 1946

- Activated on 28 February 1947

Redesignated: 71st Tactical Reconnaissance Group on 18 August 1948
Inactivated on 1 April 1949

- Redesignated 71t Operations Group on 9 December 1991

Activated on 15 December 1991.

=== Assignments ===
- II Air Support Command, 1 October 1941
- IV Air Support (later, IV Ground Air Support) Command, March 1942
- II Air Support Command (later, II Tactical Air Division), August 1942
- V Bomber Command, November 1943
- 5212 Photographic Reconnaissance Wing (Provisional), 1 March 1944
- Fifth Air Force, 12 April 1944
- 91st Photographic Wing, Reconnaissance, 1 May 1944

Attached to: 310th Bombardment Wing, 9 January – 29 May 1945
Attached to: 309th Bombardment Wing, 29 May – 25 September 1945
Attached to: 310th Bombardment Wing, 25 September – 10 November 1945

- Fifth Air Force, 10 November 1945 – 1 February 1946
- 315th Composite Wing, 28 February 1947
- 314th Composite Wing, 15 April 1947
- 71st Tactical Reconnaissance Wing, 18 August 1948 – 1 April 1949
- 71st Flying Training Wing, 15 December 1991–present

=== Components ===
- 3d Flying Training Squadron: c. April 2007-present
- 7th Flying Training Squadron: 15 December 1991 – 1 October 1992
- 8th Photo Reconnaissance (later, 8th Tactical Reconnaissance; 8th Flying Training) Squadron: 28 February 1947 – 1 April 1949; 15 December 1991–present
- 17th Observation (later, 17th Reconnaissance) Squadron: 26 February 1942 – 1 February 1946
- 25th Observation (later, 25 Liaison) Squadron: 29 March 1942 – 16 February 1945
- 25th Tactical Reconnaissance (later 25th Flying Training) Squadron: 28 February 1947 – 1 April 1949; 15 December 1991–present
- 26th Flying Training Squadron: 15 December 1991 – 1 October 1992
- 31st Reconnaissance Squadron: attached, 27 October 1947 – 1 April 1949
- 32d Flying Training Squadron: 1 June 1995 – 14 September 2012
- 33d Flying Training Squadron: 1 October 1998-present
- 82d Observation (later, 82d Reconnaissance; 82d Tactical Reconnaissance) Squadron: 5 April 1942 – 1 February 1946; 28 February 1947 – 1 April 1949
- 102d Observation Squadron: 1 October 1941 – 29 March 1942
- 110th Observation (later, 110th Reconnaissance; 110th Tactical Reconnaissance) Squadron: 1 October 1941 – 20 October 1945
- 128th Observation Squadron: 1 October 1941-c. April 1942
- Flying Training Squadron Provisional, 26: 1 October 1994 – 1 June 1995.

=== Stations ===
- Birmingham Army Airfield, Alabama, 1 October 1941
- Salinas Army Air Base, California, 21 December 1941
- Rice Army Airfield, California, 18 August 1942
- Salinas Army Air Base, California, 19 October 1942
- Esler Field, Louisiana, 24 January 1943
- Laurel Army Airfield, Mississippi, 31 March – 24 September 1943
- Port Moresby Airfield Complex, New Guinea, 7 November 1943
- Nadzab Airfield Complex, New Guinea, 20 January 1944
- Mokmer Airfield, Biak, Netherlands East Indies, 8 August 1944
- Undetermined Locations, Leyte, Philippines, 5 November 1944
- Binmaley Airstrip, Luzon, Philippines, 2 February 1945
- Ie Shima Airfield, Okinawa, August 1945
- Chofu Airfield, Japan, 6 October 1945
- Tachikawa Airfield, Japan, 23 October 1945
- Irumagawa Air Base, Japan, c. 15 January – 1 February 1946
- Itami Air Base, Japan, 28 February 1947
- Johnson Air Base, Japan, 15 April 1947
- Yokota Air Base, Japan, 31 October 1947 – 1 April 1949
- Vance AFB, Oklahoma, 15 December 1991 – present

=== Aircraft ===
- O-38, 1941
- O-46, 1941–1942
- O-47, 1941–1942
- O-49 1941–1942
- O-52, 1941–1942
- L-2, 1941–1942
- A-20, 1942–1943
- F-5, 1942–1946
- P-38, 1942–1946
- B-25, 1942–1946
- L-5, 1943–1945
- L-4, 1944
- UC-61, 1944
- UC-78, 1944–1945
- F-6, 1945–1946
- P-39, 1942–1944
- P-40, 1942–1945
- P-51, 1946–1947
- F-15, 1947–1949
- F-2, 1947–1948
- RF-61, 1949
- T-37, 1991–2008
- T-6, 2007–present
- T-38, 1991–present
- T-1, 1994–present
