= Vance Air Force Base =

US Air Force base in Garfield County, Oklahoma

- Near Enid, Oklahoma in the United States of America
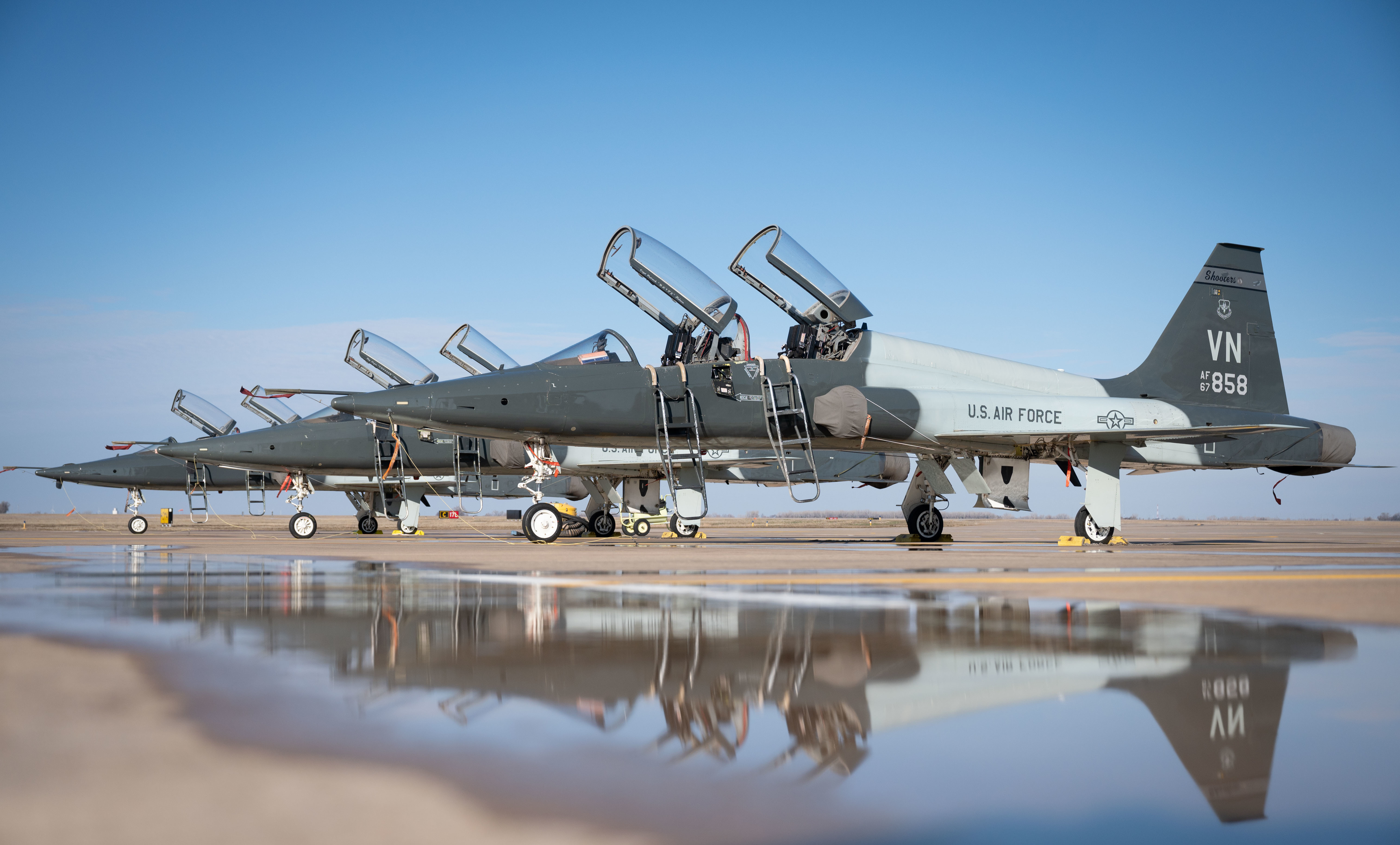
- T-38C Talons at Vance Air Force Base.

Site information
- Type: U.S. Air Force Base
- Owner: Department of Defense
- Operator: U.S. Air Force
- Controlled by: Air Education and Training Command (AETC)
- Condition: Operational
- Website: www.vance.af.mi

Location
- Location within North America Location within the United States Location within Oklahoma
- Coordinates: 36°20′21″N 97°54′59″W

Site history
- Built: 1941
- In use: 1941 – present

Garrison information
- Current commander: Colonel Charles D. Throckmorton IV
- Garrison: 71st Flying Training Wing (Host)

Airfield information
- Identifiers: IATA: END, ICAO: KEND, FAA LID: END, WMO: 723535
- Elevation: 398.3 metres (1,307 ft) AMSL
Runways
Direction	Length and surface
17R/35L	2,809.3 metres (9,217 ft) Porous European Mix
17C/35C	2,809.3 metres (9,217 ft) Porous European Mix
17L/35R	1,531.3 metres (5,024 ft) Concrete

Vance Air Force Base (IATA: END, ICAO: KEND, FAA LID: END) is a United States Air Force base located in southern Enid, Oklahoma, about 65 mi (105 km) north northwest of Oklahoma City. The base is named after local World War II hero and Medal of Honor recipient, Lieutenant Colonel Leon Vance.

The host unit at Vance is the 71st Flying Training Wing (71 FTW), which is a part of Air Education and Training Command (AETC). The commander of the 71 FTW is Colonel Charles D. Throckmorton IV. The vice-commander is Colonel Charles Schuck and the command chief is Chief Master Sergeant Brandon Smith.

== History ==
=== World War II ===
Lieutenant Colonel Leon Vance, Medal of Honor recipient.

Construction began on 12 July 1941 for a cost of $4,034,583. United States Army Air Corps project officer, Major Henry W. Dorr supervised the construction and developed the basic pilot training base. In 1941, for the sum of $1 a year, this land was leased from the city of Enid to the federal government as a site for a pilot training field, and on November 21 the base was officially activated. The installation was without a name, but was generally referred to as Air Corps Basic Flying School. The mission of the school was to train aviation cadets to become aircraft pilots and commissioned officers in the United States Army Air Forces (USAAF).

The facility was assigned to the USAAF Gulf Coast Training Center, with the Army Air Force Pilot School (Primary) activated (phase 1 pilot training), in which flight cadets were taught basic flight using two-seater training aircraft. Fairchild PT-19s were the primary trainer used.

It was not until 1942 that the base was officially named Enid Army Flying School, also known as Woodring Field. It was officially activated on 11 February 1942. On 8 January 1943, the War Department constituted and activated the 31st Flying Training Wing (Primary) at Enid and assigned it to the USAAF Central Flying Training Command. For the duration of the war, the basic phase of training graduated 8,169 students, while the advanced phase of training graduated 826.

As the demand for pilots decreased with the end of the war in Europe, the Enid Army Flying Field began ramping down pilot production and deactivated on 31 January 1947, by which time 9,895 USAAF pilots had earned wings there. In 1946, Alva, Oklahoma native Floyd E. Welsh, the War Surplus Property Officer in Washington, D.C., had pigeonholed the Enid AAF folder when it crossed his desk for disposal action. Two years later the Soviet Union blockaded Berlin, Germany, and U.S. president Harry S. Truman ordered an airlift to resupply the city. The United States Air Force (USAF), realizing a need for training facilities, asked Welsh if any World War II airfields remained in inventory. He exhumed the Enid AAF folder, and the base was reactivated on August 1, 1948, as Enid Air Force Base.

=== Cold War ===
Reactivated as Enid Air Force Base, the installation became one of several pilot training bases within the Air Training Command (ATC). Its initial mission was to provide training for advanced students in multi-engine aircraft. On July 9, 1949, in keeping with the USAF tradition of naming bases for deceased flyers, the base was renamed for Lieutenant Colonel Leon Robert Vance Jr., USAAF, an Enid native who was awarded the Medal of Honor in World War II.

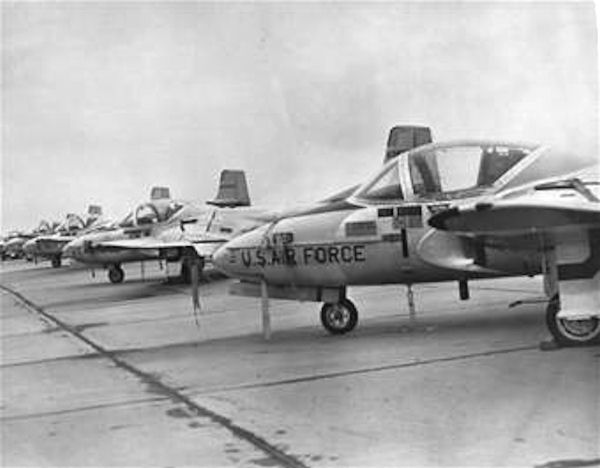
T-37s at Vance Air Force Base in 1971.

The first aircraft flown at Vance when it was still Enid AAF was the BT-13A, followed shortly by the BT-15. In 1944, advanced students flew the TB-25 and TB-26. Following the establishment of the United States Air Force as a separate service in September 1947, Enid AFB-turned-Vance AFB began conducting training in the AT-6 Texan and eventually the T-33 Shooting Star. The T-37 Tweet first flew at Vance AFB beginning in 1961, and the T-38 Talon in 1964 with Class 65-A as the USAF transitioned to its Undergraduate Pilot Training (UPT) system.

=== Post Cold War ===
In 1995 USAF officials announced that Vance would transition to the Specialized Undergraduate Pilot Training curriculum. Under SUPT, Vance students begin their training in the Beechcraft T-6 Texan II, followed by the T-1A Jayhawk for students identified for jet tanker, transport or large reconnaissance aircraft, and the T-38 Talon for fighter, bomber and other USAF fixed-wing aircraft.

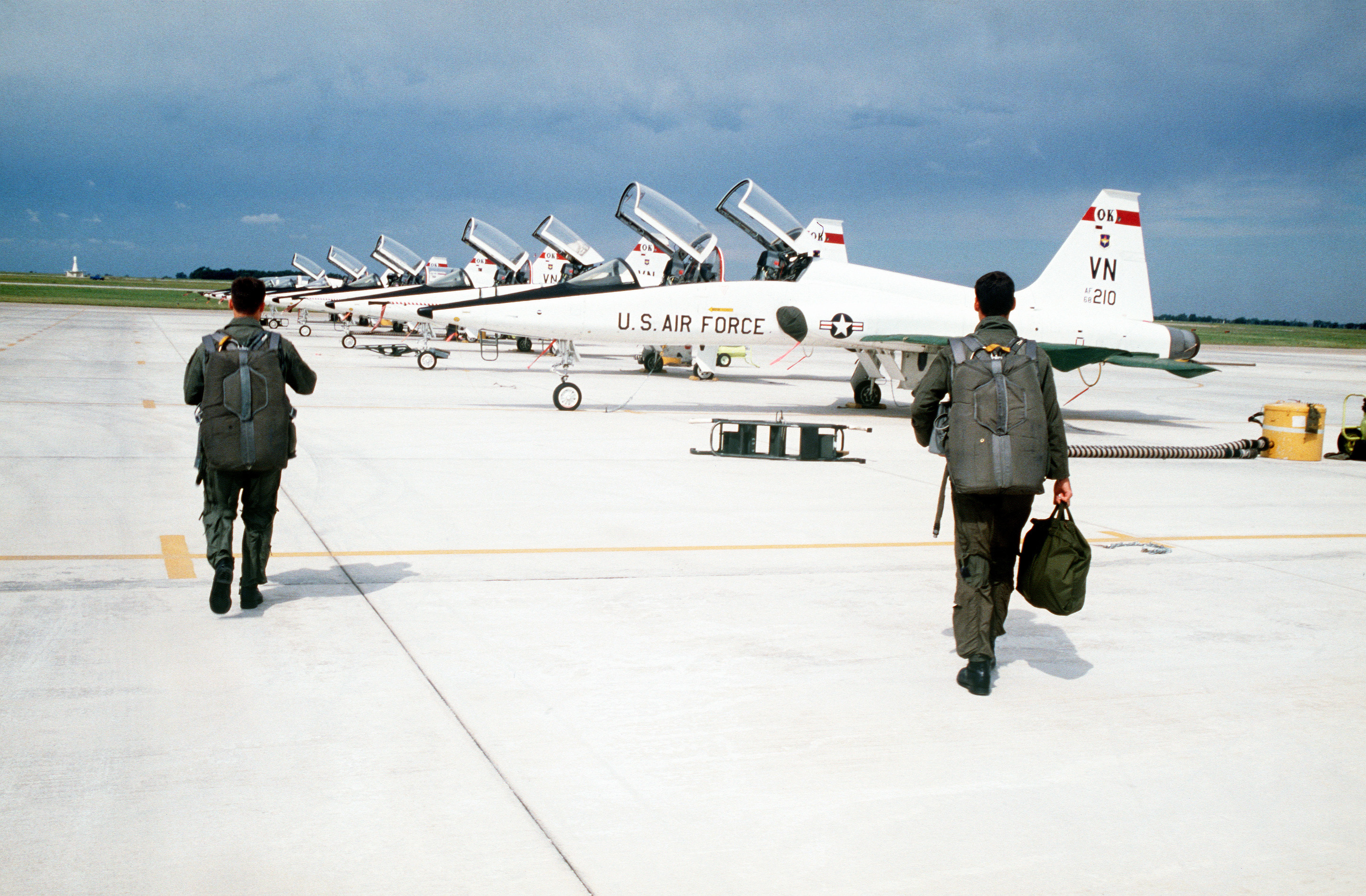
T-38A Talons of the 25th FTS at Vance AFB in November 1997.

With the introduction of the Joint Primary Aircraft Training System (JPATS) to Vance in 2005, the 71 FTW began transitioning from the T-37 to the newer T-6 Texan II. Joint training with the United States Navy (USN) and United States Marine Corps (USMC) began at Vance in 1996, with select USN and USMC strike jet student naval aviators obtaining all training at Vance in the T-37 and T-38 except for carrier qualification, which they subsequently complete in the T-45 Goshawk at Naval Air Station Meridian, Mississippi or NAS Kingsville, Texas. A number of senior naval aviators in the rank of commander have also served as squadron commander in the 71 FTW. Today, as of 2013, student naval aviators only undergo primary T-6 training at either Pensacola, FL or Corpus Christi, TX. The USN/USMC/United States Coast Guard (USCG) multi-engine maritime pipeline, the USN/USMC strike jet pipeline, or the USN/USMC/USCG rotary-wing and tilt-rotor pipeline are all held at their respective naval air stations in Florida, Texas or Mississippi.

All students practice basic patterns and landings at Kegelman Air Force Auxiliary Field located near Cherokee, Oklahoma. Vance is considered the second busiest RAPCON facility in the United States, behind Nellis AFB. Nellis AFB is open 24 hours, but Vance AFB has more traffic per hour.

The base's air park was moved to an area next to the main gate in 2010 to allow access to the public.

On April 23, 2026, a tornado passed through the southern perimeters of the base. Rated EF4 on the Enhanced Fujita scale, the violent tornado went over runway 35L and runway 35C's ALS before crossing US 81, impacting a nearby subdivision of homes along Gray Ridge Road. Numerous people were injured, though no fatalities were reported. The base was temporarily closed due to the tornado, until the following day on April 24.

=== Major Commands ===
- Gulf Coast Training Center (Air Corps), December 18, 1941 – January 23, 1942
- Air Corps Flying Training Comd, January 23, 1942 – March 15, 1942
- AAF Flying Training Comd, March 15, 1942 – July 31, 1943
- Army Air Forces Training Command, July 31, 1943 – July 1, 1946
- Air Training Command, July 1, 1946 – July 1, 1993
- Air Education and Training Command, July 2, 1993 – present

=== Base operating units ===
- 80th Air Base Sq, November 29, 1941 – June 13, 1942
- 80th Base HQ and Air Base Sq, June 13, 1942 – May 1, 1944
- 2518th AAF Base Unit (Pilot School, Basic), May 1, 1944 – February 4, 1945
- 2518th AAF Base Unit [Pilot School, Advanced-2E], February 4, 1945 – September 26, 1947
- 2518th AF Base Unit, September 26, 1947 – August 26, 1948
- 3575th Air Base Gp, August 26, 1948 – November 1, 1972
- 71st Air Base Gp, November 1, 1972 – present

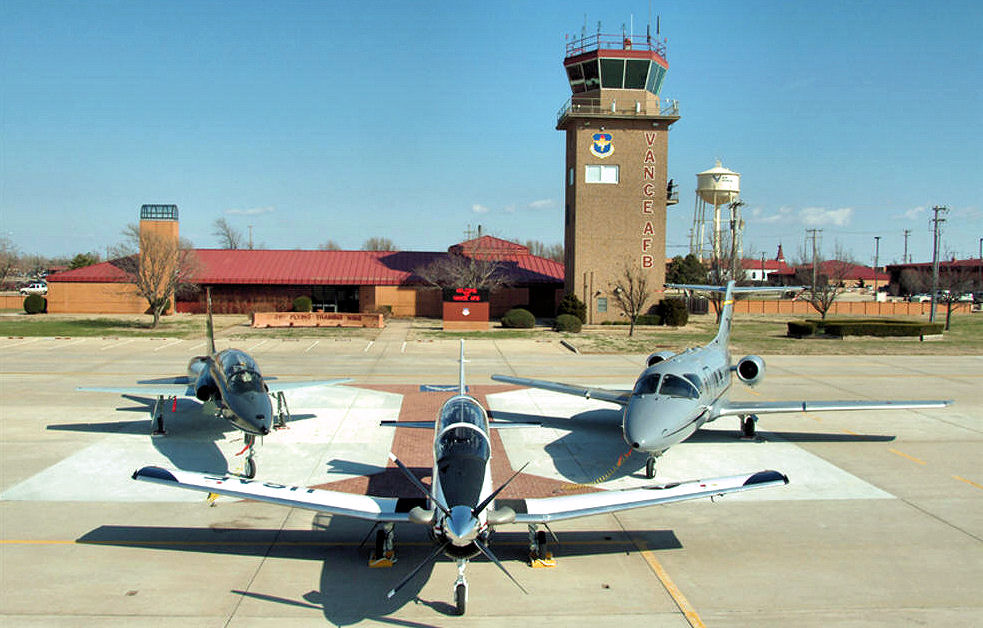
Aircraft of the 71st Flying Training Wing. From left: A T-38 Talon, T-6A Texan II, and a T-1 Jayhawk are posed in front of the base control tower on the Vance flightline.

=== Major units assigned ===
- 60th Air Base Group November 29, 1941 – December 20, 1942
- 31st Flight Training Wing January 16, 1943 – May 15, 1945
- 2518th Army Air Force/Air Force Base Unit May 1, 1944 – August 28, 1948
- 3575 Pilot Training Wing August 26, 1948 – November 1, 1972
- 8600 Pilot Training Wing June 27, 1949 – May 28, 1951
- 71st Flying Training Wing November 1, 1972 – present
- Enid Composite Squadron Civil Air Patrol

== Mission ==
The 71st Flying Training Wing trains pilots for the United States Air Force, Navy, Marine Corps, and its allies.

== Based units ==
Flying and notable non-flying units based at Vance Air Force Base.

Units marked GSU are Geographically Separate Units, which although based at Vance, are subordinate to a parent unit based at another location.

=== United States Air Force ===
Air Education and Training Command (AETC)

- Nineteenth Air Force
  - 71st Flying Training Wing (Host Wing)
    - Headquarters 71st Flying Training Wing
    - 71st Comptroller Squadron
    - 71st Operations Group
      - 3rd Flying Training Squadron – T-1A Jayhawk
      - 8th Flying Training Squadron – T-6A Texan II
      - 25th Flying Training Squadron – T-38C Talon
      - 33rd Flying Training Squadron – T-6A Texan II
      - 71st Operations Support Squadron
      - 71st Student Squadron
    - 71st Medical Group
      - 71st Healthcare Operations Squadron
      - 71st Operations Medical Readiness Squadron
      - 71st Medical Support Squadron
    - 71st Mission Support Group
      - 71st Installation Support Squadron
      - 71st Force Support Squadron
      - 71st Security Forces Squadron

Air Force Reserve Command (AFRC)

- 12th Flying Training Wing
  - 340th Flying Training Group
    - 5th Flying Training Squadron (GSU) – T-1A Jayhawk, T-38C Talon, T-6A Texan II

== Education ==
A facility of Enid Public Schools (EPS), Eisenhower Elementary School, is on-post. The majority of dependent children at the preschool and elementary level on-post attend this school. As of 2024 EPS was in the process of planning a new school building for Eisenhower ES.

Eisenhower Elementary feeds into Emerson Junior High School, and then Enid High School.

The facility does not have schools of the Department of Defense Education Activity (DoDEA).

== See also ==
- 32d Flying Training Wing (World War II)
- Air Training Command – Former U.S. Air Force training command
- Oklahoma World War II Army Airfields

== Other sources ==
- This article incorporates public domain material from the Air Force Historical Research Agency
- Manning, Thomas A. (2005), History of Air Education and Training Command, 1942–2002. Office of History and Research, Headquarters, AETC, Randolph AFB, Texas OCLC 71006954, 29991467
- Mueller, Robert (1989). Active Air Force Bases Within the United States of America on September 17, 1982. USAF Reference Series, Maxwell AFB, Alabama: Office of Air Force History. ISBN 0-912799-53-6
- Ravenstein, Charles A. (1984). Air Force Combat Wings Lineage and Honors Histories 1947–1977. Maxwell AFB, Alabama: Office of Air Force History. ISBN 0-912799-12-9.
- Shaw, Frederick J. (2004), Locating Air Force Base Sites, History’s Legacy, Air Force History and Museums Program, United States Air Force, Washington DC. OCLC 57007862, 1050653629
- Much of this text in an early version of this article was taken from pages on the Vance Air Force Base Website, which as a work of the U.S. Government is presumed to be a public domain resource.
