= 71st Flying Training Wing =

Unit of the US Air Force

71st Flying Training Wing

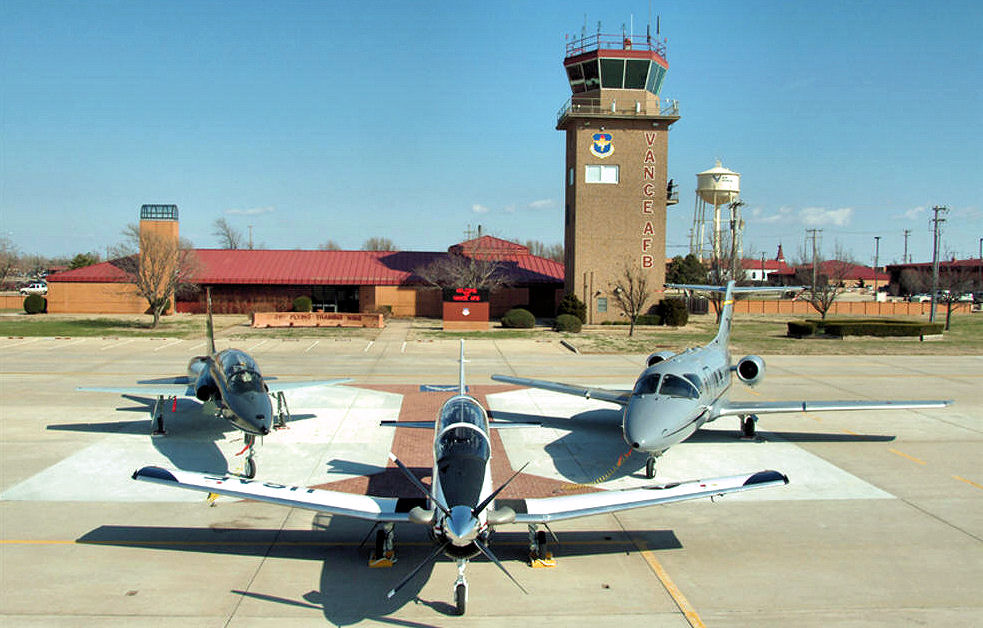
- 71st Flying Training Wing aircraft
- Active: 1948; 1955–1957; 1962–1971; 1972–present
- Country: United States
- Branch: United States Air Force
- Role: Pilot Training
- Size: About 1400 military and more than 1400 civilian employees
- Part of: Air Education and Training Command
- Garrison/HQ: Vance Air Force Base
- Decorations: Air Force Outstanding Unit Award

Commanders
- current commander: Colonel Joshua Lundeby
- Vice Commander: Colonel Sean M. Jones
- Command Chief Master Sergeant: Chief Master Sgt. Chasity V. Hert
- Notable commanders: Lloyd W. Newton

Insignia
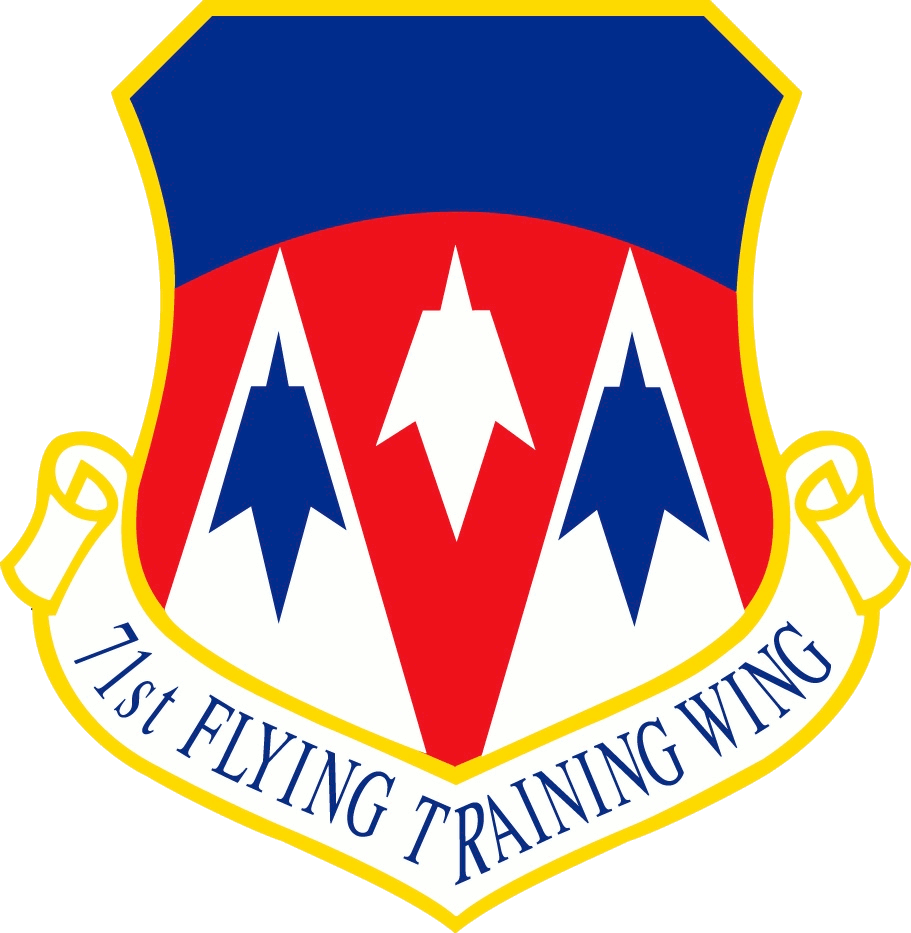
- 71st Flying Training Wing emblem (Note: Approved 12 September 1994.)

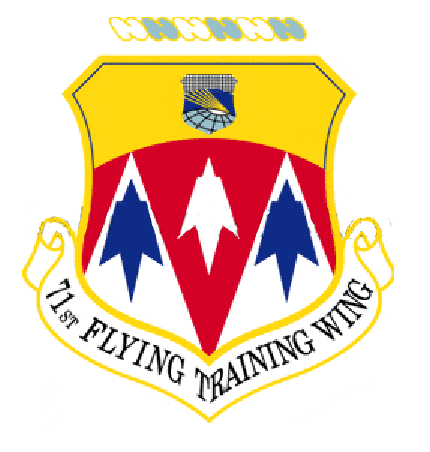
- 71st Flying Training Wing emblem (Note: Approved 2 January 1973. Description: Gules, in fess a stylized aircraft pilewise argent between two piles issuant from base of the like [color], each bearing a stylized aircraft palewise azure, on a chief arched of the last [color] a pair of wings displayed fesswise of the second [color] surmounted by an escutcheon blazoned azure, issuant from base a demi-sphere with axis bend bend sinisterwise, issuant from sinister base three rays pilewise in bend or, a chief arched argent grid lined sable, all within a diminished bordure or, the entire within a diminished bordure or. The escutcheon is the 71st Surveillance Wing emblem.)

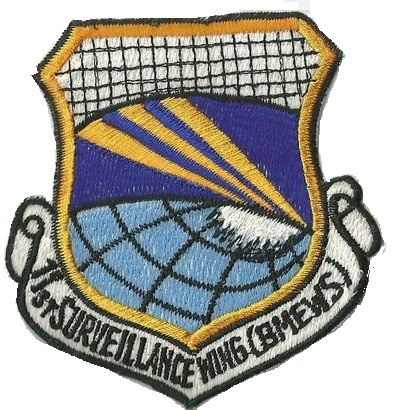
- Patch with 71st Surveillance Wing emblem (Note: Approved 22 January 1963.)
- Tail code: VN

The 71st Flying Training Wing is a United States Air Force unit assigned to Air Education and Training Command. Stationed as the host unit of Vance Air Force Base, it has conducted pilot training for the U.S. Air Force and allied nations since 1972.

The wing was briefly activated as the 71st Tactical Reconnaissance Wing in 1948 but was operational for only a few weeks before being discontinued. During the Cold War, as the 71st Strategic Reconnaissance Wing, it was a part of Strategic Air Command. The wing performed strategic reconnaissance and also tested a technique for launching small F-84K reconnaissance aircraft from GRB-36 bombers to extend the range of photographic reconnaissance and fighter escort. The testing ended in 1956, but the wing continued strategic reconnaissance until inactivated on 1 July 1957.

The wing was activated again in 1962 as the 71st Surveillance Wing. It operated and maintained systems to detect intercontinental ballistic missiles and sea-launched ballistic missile launches until it was inactivated in 1971. The wing was activated with its current mission a year later.

== Mission ==
The 71st Flying Training Wing conducts Joint Specialized Undergraduate Pilot Training. Its mission is to develop professional United States and allied nation pilots who are combat ready. It is responsible for training Air Force and allied student pilots for worldwide deployment and Aerospace Expeditionary Force support.

Joint Specialized Undergraduate Pilot Training is conducted in three phases. Phase I is preflight, Phase II is Primary and is conducted with the Beechcraft T-6 Texan II. Phase III may be either fighter-bomber track, conducted with the Northrop T-38 Talon or tanker-airlift track, conducted with the Raytheon T-1 Jayhawk.

== Units ==
- 71st Operations Group

3d Flying Training Squadron "Jayhawks" T-1 Jayhawk
5th Flying Training Squadron "Spittin' Kittens" Beechcraft T-6 Texan II, T-1 Jayhawk, Northrop T-38 Talon

The mission of the 5th is to train and provide a reserve of experienced instructor pilots to augment the Air Education and Training Command’s instructor cadre in the event of wartime mobilization.

8th Flying Training Squadron "8 Ballers" Beechcraft T-6 Texan II
25th Flying Training Squadron "Shooters" Northrop T-38 Talon
33d Flying Training Squadron "Dragons" Beechcraft T-6 Texan II
71st Operations Support Squadron "Ghostriders"
71st Student Squadron "Stucans"

- 71st Mission Support Group
- 71st Comptroller Squadron

== History ==
The 71st Observation Group trained with B-25, P-38, and P-40 aircraft beginning in October 1941. It moved to California in December 1941 and flew antisubmarine patrols off the west coast, then moved to the Southwest Pacific in the fall of 1943 and flew reconnaissance missions.

=== Initial activation ===
The wing was first activated at Kadena Air Base, Okinawa in August 1948 in the wing base reorganization of the United States Air Force, but was a viable entity for only a few days. Its tactical group was detached to the 32d Composite Wing and the wing had only one single reconnaissance squadron to perform photographic reconnaissance attached for its first week of existence. When the squadron was reassigned, the wing became non-operational and its manning was withdrawn. The wing was inactivated in late October.

=== Strategic Reconnaissance ===
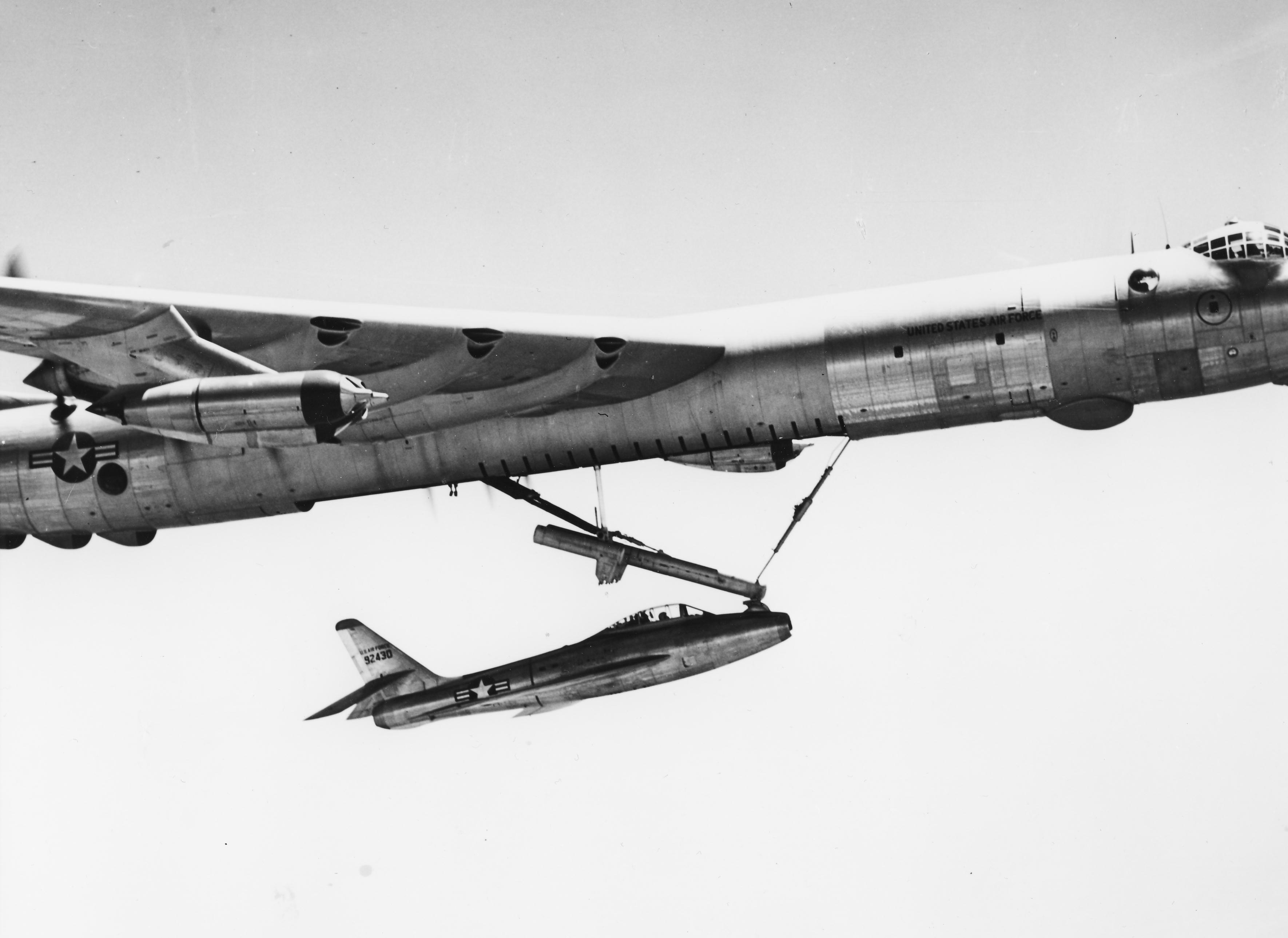
YF-84F docking with GRB-36

The wing was reactivated at Larson Air Force Base, Washington as the 71st Strategic Reconnaissance Wing. At Larson, it performed strategic reconnaissance and tested the FICON project to extend the range of photographic reconnaissance and fighter escort aircraft beginning in January 1955. FICON involved using an RF-84K, a version of the Republic RF-84F Thunderflash with a retractable "duck-bill" to enable it to be carried by a modified Convair B-36 Peacemaker to increase its range. The RF-84K was equipped with anhedral (downward-pointing) horizontal stabilizers to clear the bomb bay when in the stowed position.

The tests revealed that the "parasite" concept was achievable but not practical. Hook-ups with the GRB-36 were nearly impossible to achieve in turbulence and would likely be unworkable under combat conditions. In addition, ground clearance with the fighter mounted was around 6 inches when the RF-84K was equipped with external fuel tanks. The problem of drag was even worse. The stowed fighter reduced the range of the GRB-36 by five to ten percent.

In 1956 the entire FICON project was canceled, but the wing continued strategic reconnaissance until it was inactivated in 1957.

=== Missile warning ===
In 1962 the wing was activated again at Ent Air Force Base, Colorado as the 71st Surveillance Wing. It operated and maintained the Ballistic Missile Early Warning System, including sites in Alaska, Greenland, and England. It also operated the sea-launched ballistic missile detection and warning system and supported the USAF Spacetrack system, and monitored the over-the-horizon radar system, 1969–1971.

=== Flying training ===
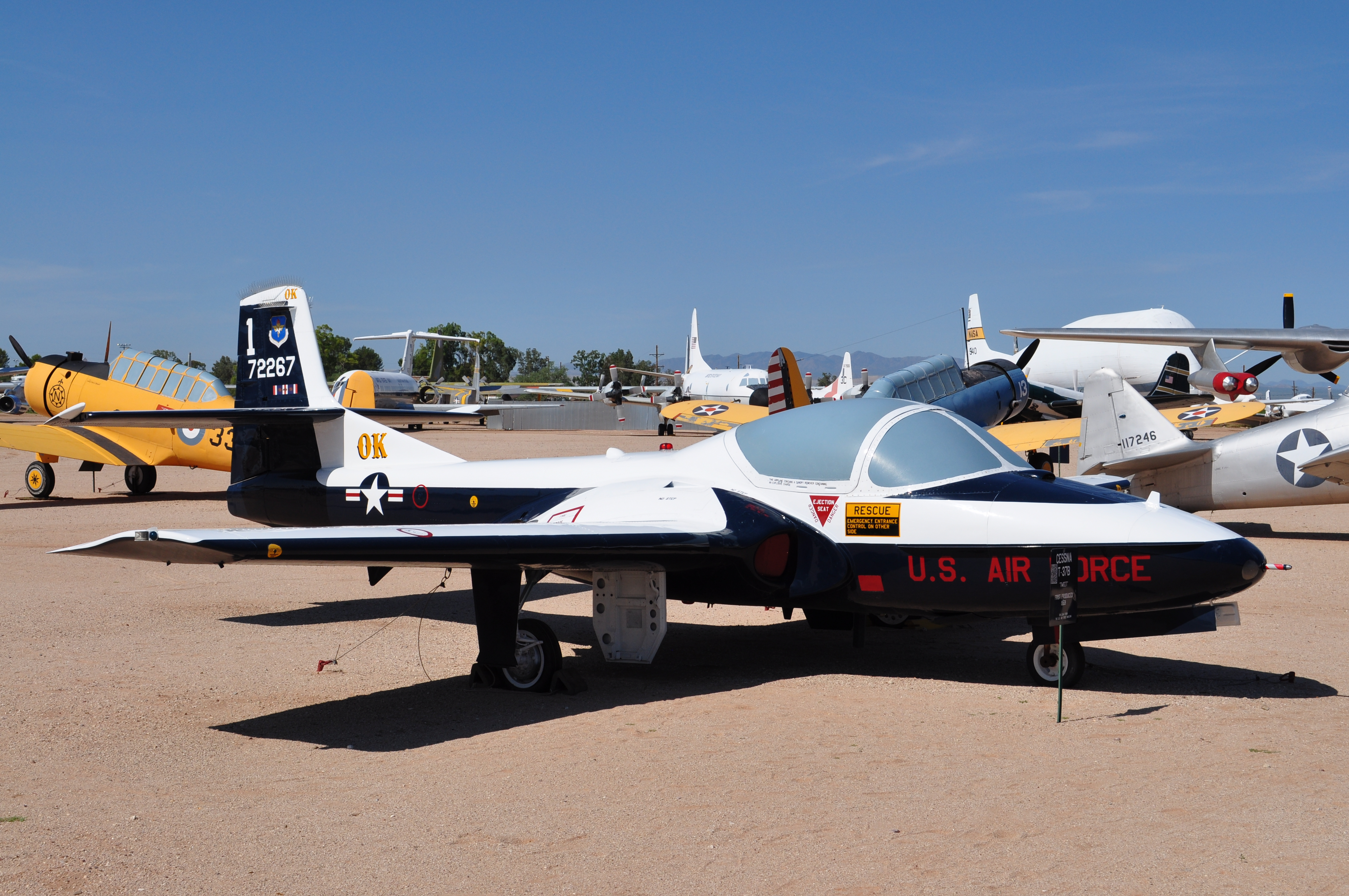
Wing Cessna T-37 (Note: Aircraft is Cessna T-37B serial 57-2267 taken at the Pima Air Museum)

The wing was redesignated the 71st Flying Training Wing and replaced the 3575th Pilot Training Wing at Vance Air Force Base, Oklahoma in November 1972, assuming control of the undergraduate pilot training for USAF, Air National Guard, Air Force Reserve, and allied countries there. In addition, it supported the Accelerated Co-Pilot Enrichment (ACE) program at numerous operating locations between 1978 and 1991. The wing provided initial flight training, and follow-on training for fighter, bomber and airlift/tanker aircraft crews for USAF, US Navy, Marine Corps and allied forces.

== Lineage ==
- Established as the 71st Tactical Reconnaissance Wing on 10 August 1948

Activated on 18 August 1948
Inactivated on 25 October 1948

- Redesignated 71st Strategic Reconnaissance Wing, Fighter on 4 November 1954

Activated on 24 January 1955
Inactivated on 1 July 1957

- Redesignated 71st Surveillance Wing (Ballistic Missile Early Warning System) and activated on 6 December 1961 (not organized)

Organized on 1 January 1962
Redesignated 71st Missile Warning Wing on 1 January 1967
Inactivated on 30 April 1971

- Redesignated 71st Flying Training Wing on 14 April 1972

Activated on 1 November 1972

=== Assignments ===
- 1st Air Division, 18 August – 25 October 1948 (attached to 32d Composite Wing after 24 August 1948)
- Fifteenth Air Force, 24 January 1955 – 1 July 1957
- Air Defense Command, 6 December 1961 (not organized)
- 9th Aerospace Defense Division, 1 January 1962
- Fourteenth Aerospace Force, 1 July 1968 – 30 April 1971
- Air Training Command (later Air Education and Training Command), 1 November 1972
- Nineteenth Air Force, 1 July 1993
- Air Education and Training Command, 12 July 2012
- Nineteenth Air Force, 1 October 2014 – present

=== Components ===
Groups

- 71st Tactical Reconnaissance Group (later 71st Operations Group): 18 August – 25 October 1948 (attached to 32d Composite Wing); 15 December 1991 – present

Squadrons

- 5th Flying Training Squadron: 16 February 1990 – 15 December 1991
- 7th Flying Training Squadron: 19 January 1990 – 15 December 1991
- 8th Flying Training Squadron: 1 November 1972 – 15 December 1991
- 12th Missile Warning Squadron, 1 January 1967 – 30 April 1971

Thule Air Base, Greenland

- 13th Missile Warning Squadron, 1 January 1967 – 30 April 1971

Clear Air Force Station, Alaska

- 23d Tactical Reconnaissance Squadron: attached 18–24 August 1948
- 25th Strategic Reconnaissance Squadron (later 25 Flying Training Squadron): 24 January 1955 – 1 July 1957; 1 November 1972 – 15 December 1991
- 26th Flying Training Squadron: 19 January 1990 – 15 December 1991
- 82d Strategic Reconnaissance Squadron: 24 January 1955 – 1 July 1957
- 91st Strategic Reconnaissance Squadron: 24 January 1955 – 1 July 1957

=== Stations ===
- Kadena Air Base, Okinawa, 18 August – 25 October 1948
- Larson Air Force Base, Washington, 24 January 1955 – 1 July 1957
- Ent Air Force Base, Colorado, 1 January 1962
- McGuire Air Force Base, New Jersey, 21 July 1969 – 30 April 1971
- Vance Air Force Base, Oklahoma, 1 November 1972 – present

=== Aircraft ===
- Boeing RB-17 Flying Fortress, 1948
- Boeing RB-29 Superfortress, 1948
- Republic RF-84F Thunderflash, 1955–1957
- Republic RF-84K (GRF-84) Thunderflash, 1955–1956
- Cessna T-41 Mescalero, 1972–1973
- Cessna T-37 Tweet, 1972–2006
- Northrop T-38 Talon, 1972–present
- Raytheon T-1 Jayhawk, 1994–present
- Beechcraft T-6 Texan II, 2004–present

== See also ==
- List of USAF Reconnaissance wings assigned to Strategic Air Command
- List of B-29 Superfortress operators
