= United States Army Air Forces in the South West Pacific Theatre =

Part of World War II

Airfields of the United States Army Air Force in the South West Pacific Theatre
- Part of World War II
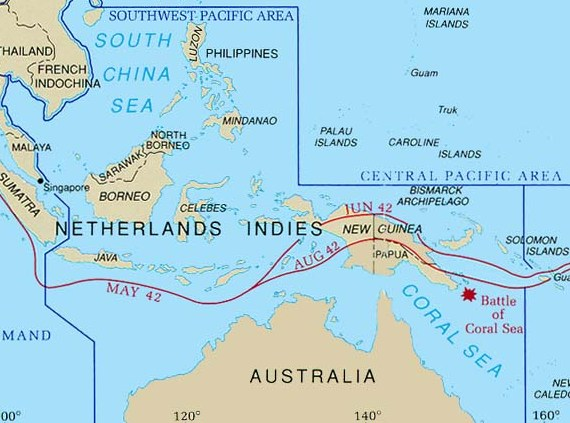
Date	1942–1945
Location	South West Pacific Theatre of World War II
Result	Allied victory over the Empire of Japan (1945)

During World War II, the United States Army Air Forces engaged in combat against the air, ground and naval forces of the Empire of Japan in the South West Pacific Theatre.

As defined by the United States Department of War, the South West Pacific theatre included the Philippines, the Dutch East Indies (excluding Sumatra), Borneo, Australia, the Australian Territory of New Guinea (including the Bismarck Archipelago), the western part of the Solomon Islands and some neighbouring territories. The theatre took its name from the major Allied command, which was known simply as the "South West Pacific Area".

The major USAAF combat organizations in the region was Fifth Air Force, based in Australia after the Battle of the Philippines (1941–42). From Australia, the Allied forces, led by General Douglas MacArthur, first moved north into New Guinea in 1942, then into the Netherlands East Indies in 1943, and returning to the Philippines in 1944 and 1945. Moving with the Allied ground forces, the USAAF Fifth Air Force established a series of airfields, some at existing facilities, but most were carved out of the jungle to provide tactical air support of the ground forces.

In addition to the Fifth Air Force units, elements of Seventh and Thirteenth Air Force advanced into the theatre as Japanese land and naval forces were driven out of the Central and South Pacific Areas.

== Airfields and major unit assignments ==
These airfields, and the headquarters of major units assigned (less Australia) were:

BISMARCK ARCHIPELAGO

- Cape Gloucester Strip, Cape Gloucester, New Britain Island (Emergency field)

05°27′33″S 148°25′57″E
8th Fighter Group, (20 February-13 March 1944)

35th Fighter Squadron, 20 February-13 March 1944
80th Fighter Squadron, 28 February-24 March 1944

- Jacquinot Bay Airport, New Britain Island (Fighter field)

05°39′03″S 151°30′25″E

- Momote Airdrome, Los Negros, Admiralty Islands (Main transport base)

02°03′42.80″S 147°25′26.94″E
HQ, Thirteenth Air Force, (15 June–12 September 1944)
HQ, XIII Bomber Command, (1 June-3 September 1944)
5th Bombardment Group, (Heavy) (13th AF) (7 April–16 August 1944)

23d Bombardment Squadron (Heavy), (16 April-29 August 1947)
31st Bombardment Squadron (Heavy), (20 April-19 August 1944)
72d Bombardment Squadron (Heavy), (15 April-18 August 1944)
394th Bombardment Squadron (Heavy), 13 April-24 August 1944

307th Bombardment Group (Heavy), (13th AF) (29 April–23 August 1944)

370th Bombardment Squadron (Heavy), (13 May-21 August 1944)
371st Bombardment Squadron (Heavy), (13 May-21 August 1944)
372d Bombardment Squadron (Heavy), (13 May-21 August 1944)
424th Bombardment Squadron (Heavy), (13 May-21 August 1944)

403d Troop Carrier Group, (13th AF) (30 August–3 October 1944)

63d Troop Carrier Squadron, (13 August-30 September 1944)

419th Night Fighter Squadron, (18th Fighter Group detachment), (13th AF) (27 June–18 August 1944)

- New Guinea

Port Moresby Airfield Complex

By 1944, Port Moresby had eight airfields, with units deploying their headquarters and squadrons around the area. Operational airfields in the area included Kila Airfield (3 Mile) for fighters and bombers; Wards Airfield (5 Mile) Airfield for heavy bombers and transport planes; Jackson Airfield (7 Mile) which was primarily a command base; Berry Airfield (12 Mile) a fighter and medium bomber base near Bomana; Schwimmer Airfield (14 Mile) for fighter and medium bomber base; Durand Airfield (17 Mile) another fighter and medium bomber base; Rogers Airfield (Rarona, 30 Mile), a fighter and medium bomber base, and Fishermans Airfield (Daugo), an emergency landing strip on offshore island.

Kila Airfield (3 Mile Drome), Port Moresby
09°29′24.92″S 147°11′31.19″E

Headquarters, 3d Bombardment Group (28 January – 20 May 1943)

8th, 13th, 89th, 90th Bomb Squadrons

8th Fighter Squadron (49th Fighter Group), 25 September – 15 April 1943
80th Fighter Squadron (8th Fighter Group), 21 March – 11 December 1943

Wards Airfield (5 Mile Drome), Port Moresby
09°26′36″S 147°13′12″E

Headquarters: V Fighter Command (December–January 1942)
Headquarters: 54th Troop Carrier Wing (3 May 1943 – 18 April 1944)
317th Troop Carrier Group (30 September 1943 – April 1944)
374th Troop Carrier Wing (December 1942-7 October 1943)
375th Troop Carrier Group (December 1942 – 7 October 1943)
6th Troop Carrier Squadron, 13 October 1942 – 2 October 1943
21st Troop Carrier Squadron, 18 February – 28 September 1943
22d Troop Carrier Squadron, 24 January – 4 October 1943
33d Troop Carrier Squadron, 28 December 1942 – 5 October 1943
6th Reconnaissance Group (10 December 1943 – 17 February 1944)
71st Reconnaissance Group (7 November 1943 – 20 January 1944)
320th Bombardment Squadron, 10 February – December 1943
321st Bombardment Squadron, 10 February – December 1943

Jackson Airfield (7 Mile Drome), Port Moresby
09°26′36″S 147°13′12″E

43d Bombardment Group (14 September 1942 – 10 December 1943)
90th Bombardment Group (10 February – December 1943)
345th Bombardment Group (5 June 1943 – 18 January 1944)
8th Fighter Group (16 May – 23 December 1943)
49th Fighter Group (9 October 1942 – March 1943)
348th Fighter Group (23 June – 16 December 1943)

Berry Airfield (12 Mile Drome), Port Moresby
09°23′19.78″S 147°14′42.82″E

8th Fighter Squadron (49th Fighter Group)

Schwimmer Airfield (14 Mile Drome), Port Moresby
09°22′25.56″S 147°13′56.82″E

13th Bombardment Squadron (3d Bombardment Group)
9th Fighter Squadron (49th Fighter Group)
39th Fighter Squadron (35th Fighter Group)

Durand Airfield (17 Mile Drome), Port Moresby
09°22′57.35″S 147°10′23.76″E

38th Bombardment Group (October 1942 – 4 March 1944)

Headquarters, 69th, 70th 71st, 405th Bomb Squadrons

13th Bombardment Squadron (3d Bombardment Group)
90th Bombardment Squadron (3d Bombardment Group)
499th Bombardment Squadron (345th Bombardment Wing)
7th Fighter Squadron (49th Fighter Group)

Rogers (Rarona) Airfield (30 Mile Drome), Port Moresby
09°02′37.12″S 146°53′40.32″E

35th Fighter Group (22 July 1942 – 15 August 1943)

Headquarters, 39th, 40th, 41st, Fighter Squadrons

7th Fighter Squadron (49th Fighter Group) P-40 Warhawk

Fishermans (Daugo Island) Airfield, Port Moresby
09°30′47.64″S 147°03′02.06″E

Built by the RAAF c. 1944 as an emergency airfield

Gurney Field (No. 1 Strip), Milne Bay
10°18′41″S 150°20′01″E

8th Fighter Group (18 September 1942 – February 1943)
418th Night Fighter Squadron (2–22 November 1943)
421st Night Fighter Squadron (4–27 January 1944)

No. 2 Strip, Milne Bay
10°18′42″S 150°15′42″E

Never used due to drainage problems.

Turnbull Field (No. 3 Strip), Milne Bay
10°18′14″S 150°23′20″E

Saidor Airfield, Madang Province
05°37′42.92″S 146°27′54.29″E

417th Bombardment Group (8 February – 9 September 1944)
58th Fighter Group (3 April – 30 August 1944)
348th Fighter Group (29 March 1944)

Dobodura Airfield Complex, Oro Province
The main Dobodura complex had eleven airstrips, most interconnected for taxiing purposes.
08°48′16.36″S 148°18′32.57″E

3d Bombardment Group (20 May 1943 – 3 February 1944)
22d Bombardment Group (9 October 1943 – 13 January 1944)
43d Bombardment Group (10 December 1943 – 4 March 1944)
90th Bombardment Group (December 1943 – 23 February 1944)
345th Bombardment Group (18 January – 16 February 1944)
417th Bombardment Group (7 February – 8 April 1944)
49th Fighter Group ( – 20 March November 1943)
58th Fighter Group (28 December 1943 – 3 April 1944)
475th Fighter Group (14 August 1943 – 24 March 1944)
418th Night Fighter Squadron (22 November 1943 – 28 March 1944)

Oro Bay (Cape Sudest) Airfield, Oro Province
08°40′16.37″S 148°24′42.44″E

308th Bombardment Wing (1 February – 2 July 1944)
417th Bombardment Group (28 January – 4 February 1944)
547th Night Fighter Squadron (5 September – 6 October 1944)

Nadzab Airfield Complex, Morobe Province
The Nadzab airfield complex included five separate airstrips, including a prewar airfield at Narakapor Plantation.
06°34′07.56″S 146°43′34.70″E

Headquarters: Fifth Air Force (15 June – 10 August 1944)
Headquarters: V Bomber Command (21 February – 15 August 1944)
Headquarters: V Fighter Command (January–July 1944)
91st Reconnaissance Wing (30 March – 10 August 1944)
54th Troop Carrier Wing (18 April – 5 October 1944)
3d Bombardment Group (3 February – 12 May 1944)
22d Bombardment Group (13 January – 11 August 1944)
38th Bombardment Group (4 March – 1 October 1944)
43d Bombardment Group (4 March – 2 July 1944)
90th Bombardment Group (23 February – 10 August 1944)
345th Bombardment Group (16 February – July 1944)
8th Fighter Group (14 March – 17 June 1944)
35th Fighter Group (5 October 1943 – 7 February 1944)
475th Fighter Group (24 March – 15 May 1944)
6th Reconnaissance Group (17 February – August 1944)
71st Reconnaissance Group (20 January – 8 August 1944)
374 Troop Carrier Group (1 September – 14 October 1944)
375th Troop Carrier Group (1 September – 14 October 1944)
433d Troop Carrier Group (25 August 1943 – 17 October 1944)
421st Night Fighter Squadron (27 January – 28 June 1944)
419th Night Fighter Squadron (Detachment) (13th AF) (26 June – 25 July 1944)

Finschafen Airfield (Dreger Field), Morobe Province
06°37′20.25″S 147°51′14.81″E

86th Fighter Wing (1 May – 1 August 1944)
8th Fighter Group (23 December 1943 – 20 February 1944)
49th Fighter Group (19 April – 17 May 1944)
348th Fighter Group (16 December 1943 – 29 March 1944)
317th Troop Carrier Group (April–June 1944)
418th Night Fighter Squadron (28 March – 12 May 1944)

Gusap Airfield, Morobe Province
06°03′12.93″S 145°57′37.25″E

85th Fighter Wing (25 February – 24 July 1944)
310th Bombardment Wing (1 February – 6 May 1944)
312th Bombardment Group (1 January – June 1944)
35th Fighter Group (7 February – 22 July 1944)
49th Fighter Group (20 November 1943 – 19 April 1944)

Lae Airfield, Morobe Province
06°43′59.58″S 146°59′44.90″E

309th Bombardment Wing (1 February – 3 March 1944)

Tsili Tsili (Tsile-Tsile) Airfield, Morobe Province
06°50′55.34″S 146°20′59.67″E

35th Fighter Group (15 August – 5 October 1943)

- Netherlands East Indies

Hollandia Airfield Complex, Papua Province
(Hollandia, Sentani and Cyclops Airfields, Sentani only airfield still in use)
02°34′36.93″S 140°30′58.72″E

Headquarters, Thirteenth Air Force (13 September–23, 1944)
308th Bombardment Wing (10 August – 22 October 1944)
310th Bombardment Wing (6 May – 18 September 1944)
85th Fighter Wing (24 July – 24 October 1944)
3d Bombardment Group (12 May – 16 November 1944)
42d Bombardment Wing (13th AF) (August–September 1944)
312th Bombardment Group ( – 19 June November 1944)
49th Fighter Group (17 May – 5 June 1944)
475th Fighter Group (15 May – 14 July 1944)
317th Troop Carrier Group ( – 17 June November 1944)
418th Night Fighter Squadron (12 May – 28 September 1944)
550th Night Fighter Squadron (13th AF) (14 December 1944 – 14 February 1945)

Wakde Airfield, Wakde, Papua Province
01°56′20.38″S 139°00′51.44″E

Headquarters, XIII Bomber Command (3 September – 17 October 1944)
5th Bombardment Group (13th AF) (17 August – 22 September 1944)
307th Bombardment Group (13th AF) (24 August – 18 October 1944)
348th Fighter Group (22 May – 26 August 1944)

Sansapor (March) Airfield, West Irian Jaya Province
00°25′05.71″S 132°11′32.50″E

Headquarters, XIII Fighter Command (15 August 1944 – 10 January 1945)
86th Fighter Wing (19 August 1944 – 16 January 1945)
18th Fighter Group (13th AF) (23 August 1944 – 13 January 1945)
347th Fighter Group (13th AF) (15 August – 19 September 1944)

Middleburg (Toem) Airfield, West Irian Jaya Province
00°22′13.53″S 132°11′42.57″E

86th Fighter Wing (4 August–19, 1944)
347th Fighter Group (13th AF) (19 September 1944 – 22 February 1945)
419th Night Fighter Squadron (13th AF) (21 August 1944 – 6 March 1945)
550th Night Fighter Squadron (DET) (13th AF) (31 December 1944 – 14 February 1945)

Kornasoren (Yebrurro) Airfield Noemfoor, Schouten Islands
00°56′08.80″S 134°52′19.51″E

Headquarters, Thirteenth Air Force (23 September – 29 October 1944)
309th Bombardment Wing (28 July – 9 November 1944)
5th Bomb Group (13th AF) (22 September – October 1944)
417th Bombardment Group (9 September – 6 December 1944)
58th Fighter Group (30 August 1944 – 3 April 1944)
348th Fighter Group (26 August 1944 – 16 November 1944)

Mokmer Airfield, Biak
01°11′24″S 136°06′27″E
38th Bombardment Group (1 October–15, 1944)
54th Troop Carrier Wing, 5 October 1944 – 14 February 1945)

2d Combat Cargo Group, November 1944 – May 1945

5th Combat Cargo Squadron, November–May 1945
6th Combat Cargo Squadron, November 1944-25 March 1945 (operated from Samar 8–25 March)
7th Combat Cargo Squadron, November 1944 – May 1945
8th Combat Cargo Squadron, January-18 March 1945

90th Bombardment Group (10 August 1944 – 26 January 1945)
345th Bombardment Group ( – 12 July November 1944)
49th Fighter Group (5 June – 24 October 1944)
475th Fighter Group (14 July – 28 October 1944)
6th Reconnaissance Group ( – 3 August November 1944)

71st Reconnaissance Group (8 August – 5 November 1944)
91st Reconnaissance Wing (10 August – 12 November 1944)

374th Troop Carrier Group (14 October 1944 – 28 May 1945)
375th Troop Carrier Group (14 October 1944 – 28 May 1945)
403d Troop Carrier Group (13th AF) (4 October 1944 – 25 June 1945)
419th Night Fighter Squadron (Det) (13th AF) (26 July – 27 November 1943)

Wama Airfield, Morotai
02°02′42.82″N 128°19′28.95″E

Headquarters, Thirteenth Air Force (29 October 1944 – 1 March 1945)
Headquarters, XIII Bomber Command (17 October 1944 – 27 August 1945)
5th Bomb Group (13th AF) (October 1944 – 5 March 1945)
38th Bombardment Group (15 October 1944 – 29 January 1945)
310th Bombardment Wing (18 September – 14 November 1944)
307th Bombardment Group (13th AF) (18 October 1944 – September 1945)
8th Fighter Group (19 September 20 December 1944)
35th Fighter Group (27 September 1944 – 20 January 1945)
4th Reconnaissance Group (13th AF) (12 December 1944 – September 1945)
418th Night Fighter Squadron (28 September – 26 December 1944)
419th Night Fighter Squadron (DET), (13th AF) (27 November 1944 – 16 March 1945)
550th Night Fighter Squadron (13th AF) (14 February – 7 April 1945)

Owi Airfield, Pulau Owi, Schouten Islands
01°14′38.75″S 136°12′42.44″E

Headquarters: Fifth Air Force (10 August – 20 November 1944)
Headquarters: V Bomber Command (15 August – November 1944)
Headquarters: V Fighter Command (July–November 1944)
308th Bombardment Wing (2 July – 10 August 1944)
309th Bombardment Wing (9 November 1944 – 8 February 1945)
22d Bombardment Group (11 August – 15 November 1944)
43d Bombardment Group (2 July – 15 November 1944)
8th Fighter Group (17 June – 19 September 1944)
35th Fighter Group (22 July – 27 September 1944)
418th Night Fighter Squadron (Detachment) (16 September – 5 October 1944)
421st Night Fighter Squadron (28 June – 25 October 1944)
547th Night Fighter Squadron (6 October – 31 December 1944)

- Philippine Islands (1944–1945 Campaign)

Binmaley Airstrip, Luzon
16°02′03.20″N 120°15′58.08″E
Temporary PSP airstrip on "Yellow Beach" as part of United States Army Lingayen Gulf landing on 9 January 1945. Dismantled after the war.

71st Reconnaissance Group (5 February – August 1945)

Clark Field, Luzon
15°11′09″N 120°33′37″E
Major United States Army airfield in the Philippines from 1919. Occupied by Imperial Japanese Army January 1942 – January 1945. Active USAF base from after liberation until 1991 when destroyed after Mount Pinatubo explosion.
Battle of the Philippines (1941–42)

V Bomber Command, 14 November – 24 December 1941
20th Pursuit Squadron, July – December 1941 (P-40B)
14th Bombardment Squadron 16 September 1941 – 1 January 1942 (B-17)
24th Pursuit Group, 1 October – 20 December 1941 (P-40B)
19th Bombardment Group, 26 October – 24 December 1941 (B-17)
30th Bombardment Squadron 23d – 20 October December 1941 (B-17)
93d Bombardment Squadron 23d – 20 October December 1941 (B-17)

Philippines Campaign (1944–45)

Headquarters, Fifth Air Force ( – 4 April August 1945)
Headquarters, V Bomber Command (March–August 1945)
Headquarters, V Fighter Command (March–August 1945)
Headquarters, XIII Bomber Command (27 August 1945 – 15 March 1946)
310th Bombardment Wing (23 August – 21 October 1945)
91st Reconnaissance Wing (24 March – 30 July 1945)
22d Bombardment Group (12 March – 4 August 1945)
43d Bombardment Group (16 March – 26 July 1945)
345th Bombardment Group (12 May – 25 July 1945)
35th Fighter Group (19 April – 28 June 1945)
475th Fighter Group (28 February – 20 April 1945)
6th Reconnaissance Group (1 May – 31 July 1945)
54th Troop Carrier Group (June–September 1945)
317th Troop Carrier Group (17 March – 24 August 1945)
433d Troop Carrier Group (31 May – 11 September 1945)
421st Night Fighter Squadron (26 April – 5 August 1945)

Floridablanca Airfield (Basa Air Base), Floridablanca, Luzon
14°59′11.34″N 120°29′32.99″E

312th Bombardment Group (19 April – 13 August 1945)
348th Fighter Group (15 May – 6 July 1945)

Laoag Airfield, Luzon
18°10′41.13″N 120°31′53.48″E

3d Air Commando Group, (April–August 1945)

Lingayen Airfield, Lingayen Luzon
16°02′06.21″N 120°14′29.81″E

309th Bombardment Wing (29 May – 12 October 1945)
38th Bombardment Group (29 January – 25 July 1945)
18th Fighter Group (13th AF) (13 January – 1 March 1945)
35th Fighter Group (10 April–19, 1945)
49th Fighter Group (25 February – 16 August 1945)
475th Fighter Group (20 April – 8 August 1945)
547th Night Fighter Squadron (18 January – 13 August 1945)

Mangaldan Airfield, Mangaldan, Luzon
16°04′00.62″N 120°24′03.67″E

35th Fighter Group (20 January – 10 April 1945)
58th Fighter Group (5 April–18, 1945)
312th Bombardment Group (10 February – 19 April 1945)
3d Air Commando Group (24 October – December 1944)

Nielson Field, Luzon
14°33′02.06″N 121°01′46.08″E

374 Troop Carrier Group, (28 May 1945 – 15 May 1946)
403d Troop Carrier Group (13th AF) (25 June 1945 – January 1946)

Porac Airfield, Porac, Luzon
15°04′21.43″N 120°32′32.95″E

58th Fighter Group (18 April – 10 July 1945)
375th Troop Carrier Group (20 May – August 1945)

San Marcelino Airfield, San Marcelino, Luzon
14°58′29.22″N 120°09′23.07″E

308th Bombardment Wing (11 January – 16 June 1945)
309th Bombardment Wing (8 February – 29 May 1945)
90th Bombardment Group (26 January – 10 August 1945)
345th Bombardment Group (13 February – 12 May 1945)
348th Fighter Group (4 February – 15 May 1945)
421st Night Fighter Squadron (25 October 1944 – 8 February 1945)
547th Night Fighter Squadron (December 1944 – 16 January 1945)

Puerto Princesa Airfield, Palawan
09°44′31.63″N 118°45′31.43″E

Headquarters, XIII Fighter Command, (1 March 1945 – November 1945)
42d Bombardment Group, (13th AF) (March 1945 – January 1946)
347th Fighter Group, (13th AF) (6 March – December 1945)
419th Night Fighter Squadron, (13th AF) (6 March 1945 – 10 January 1946)
550th Night Fighter Squadron (DET), (13th AF) (9 June–19, 1945)

Tanauan Airfield, Tanauan, Leyte
11°06′15.11″N 125°01′14.08″E

312th Bombardment Group (19 November 1944 – 10 February 1945)
433d Troop Carrier Group (19 January – 31 May 1945)

Bayug Airfield, Burauen, Leyte
10°59′05.41″N 124°54′41.31″E

Headquarters, Fifth Air Force (20 November 1944 – January 1945)
Headquarters, V Bomber Command (November 1944 – January 1945)
Headquarters, V Fighter Command (November 1944 – January 1945)
Headquarters, XIII Fighter Command (10 January – 1 March 1945)
308th Bombardment Wing (22 October 1944 – 11 January 1945)
310th Bombardment Wing (14 November – 15 December 1944)
85th Fighter Wing, (June 1945 – July 1946)
91st Reconnaissance Wing (12 November 1944 – 28 January 1945)
54th Troop Carrier Wing (14 February – June 1945)
6th Reconnaissance Group (3 November 1944 – 1 May 1945)
71st Reconnaissance Group (5 November 1944 – 5 February 1945)

Dulag Airfield, Dulag, Leyte
10°58′56.41″N 125°00′38.23″E
Liberated in November 1944

3d Bombardment Group (16 November – 30 December 1944)
22d Bombardment Group (15 November–26, 1944)
345th Bombardment Group (12 November 1944 – 1 January 1945)
475th Fighter Group (28 October 1944 – 5 February 1945)
2d Combat Cargo Group ( – 20 May August 1945)
317th Troop Carrier Group (17 November 1944 – 17 March 1944)
418th Night Fighter Squadron (14 November–30, 1944)

Tacloban Airfield, Tacloban City, Leyte
11°13′39″N 125°01′40″E

43d Bombardment Wing (15 November 1944 – 16 March 1945)
345th Bombardment Group (1 January – 13 February 1945)
417th Bombardment Group (6 December–22, 1944)
49th Fighter Group (24 October – 30 December 1944)
348th Fighter Group (16 November 1944 – 4 February 1945)
421st Night Fighter Squadron (25 October 1944 – 8 February 1945)
547th Night Fighter Squadron (9 November 1944 – 11 January 1945)

McGuire Field, San Jose, Mindoro
12°21′41.72″N 121°02′49.73″E

Headquarters, Fifth Air Force (January–April 1945)
Headquarters, V Bomber Command (January–March 1945)
Headquarters, V Fighter Command (January–March 1945)
Headquarters, Thirteenth Air Force (1 March 1945 – January 1946)
310th Bombardment Wing (15 December 1944 – 23 August 1945)
91st Reconnaissance Wing (28 January – 24 March 1945)
3d Bombardment Group (30 December 1944 – 6 August 1945)
380th Bombardment Group (20 February – 9 August 1945)
417th Bombardment Group (22 December 1944 – 17 August 1945)
8th Fighter Group (20 December 1944 – 6 August 1945)
49th Fighter Group (30 December 1944 – 25 February 1945)
58th Fighter Group (30 December 1944 – 5 April 1945)
475th Fighter Group (30 December 1944 – 6 August 1945)
375th Troop Carrier Group (27 February – 20 May 1945)
418th Night Fighter Squadron (26 December 1944 – 9 July 1945)
547th Night Fighter Squadron (December 1944 – 16 January 1945)
550th Night Fighter Squadron (13th AF)

Detachment: 8 March – 7 April 1945
Full Squadron: 7 April – 4 December 1945

San Roque Airfield (Moret Field), Zamboanga City, Mindanao
06°55′20.71″N 122°03′34.69″E

18th Fighter Group (13th AF) (4 May – 10 November 1945)
58th Fighter Group (18 November – 30 December 1944)
419th Night Fighter Squadron (DET), (13th AF) (18 March – 20 July 1945)
550th Night Fighter Squadron (DET), (13th AF) (28 May – August 1945)

Guiuan Airfield, Samar
11°02′03.93″N 125°44′23.47″E

5th Bombardment Group (13th AF) (5 March – December 1945)
22d Bombardment Group (20 January – 12 March 1945)

Sanga Sanga Airfield, Sulu
05°02′49.18″N 119°44′34.92″E

419th Night Fighter Squadron (DET), (13th AF) (20 June – 24 July 1945)

- Airfields used during the Battle of the Philippines (1941–42)

7th Bombardment Group
19th Bombardment Group
24th Pursuit Group

Bataan Airfield, Luzon

14°27′14.81″N 120°34′06.63″E (Approximate)

Del Carmen Airfield, Luzon
Del Monte Airfield, Mindanao

08°21′41.59″N 124°49′59.97″E (Approximate)

Iba Airfield, Luzon
Nichols Field, Luzon

== See also ==
- United States Army Air Forces in the Pacific War (1941–1945)
  - USAAF in Australia
  - USAAF in the Central Pacific
  - USAAF in the South Pacific
  - USAAF in Okinawa
