= 550th Fighter Squadron =

550th Fighter Squadron

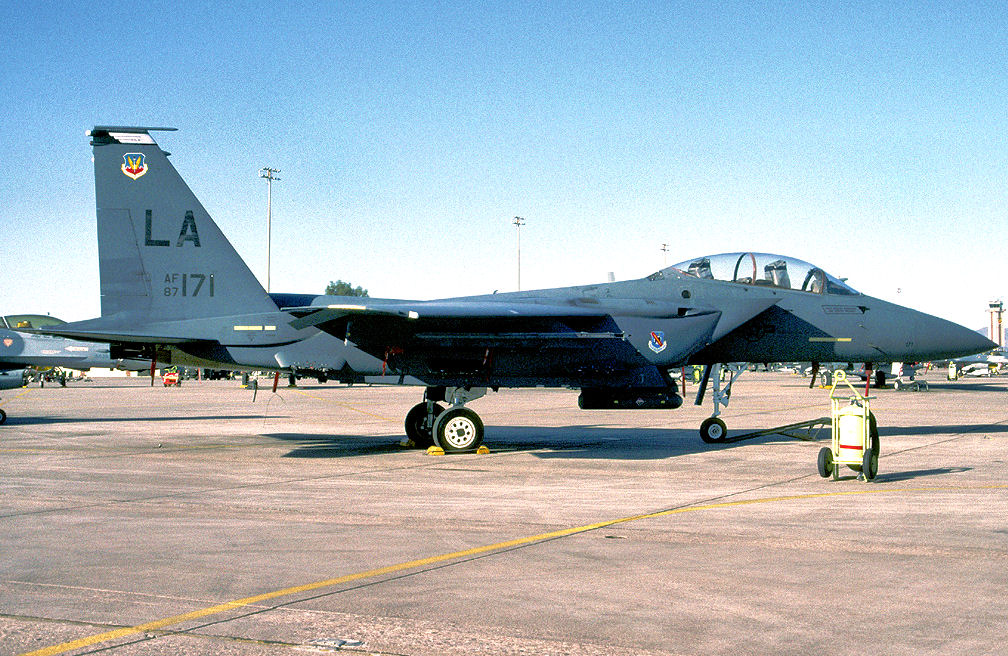
- 550th Tactical Fighter Training Squadron F-15E Strike Eagle (Note: Aircraft is McDonnell Douglas F-15E-44-MC Strike Eagle serial 87-171.)
- Active: 1944–1946; 1970-1991; 1994-1995, 2017-
- Country: United States
- Branch: United States Air Force
- Role: F-15C Replacement Training Unit
- Part of: Air Combat Command
- Nickname: Silver Eagles
- Colors: Silver and black
- Mascot: Eagle
- Engagements: World War II Asiatic-Pacific Theatre
- Decorations: Air Force Outstanding Unit Award; Philippine Presidential Unit Citation

Insignia
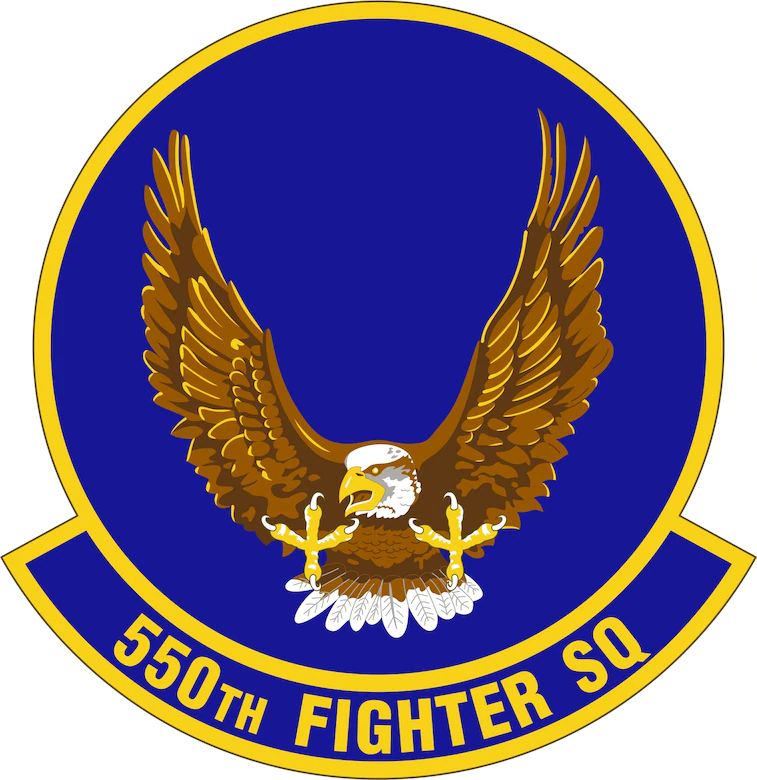
- 550th Fighter Squadron emblem (approved 26 June 2017)

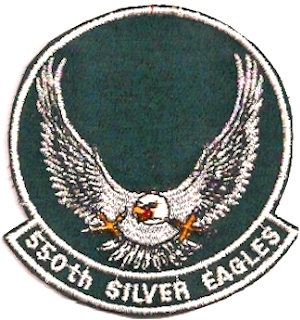
- Patch with 550th Tactical Fighter Training Squadron emblem (approved 10 April 1978)

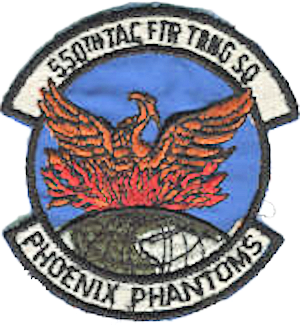
- Patch with 550th Tactical Fighter Training Squadron emblem (approved c. 1970)

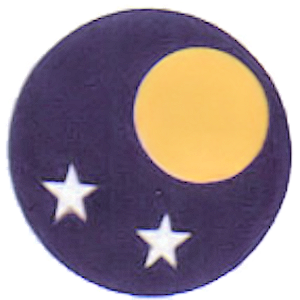
- Unofficial 550th Night Fighter Squadron emblem

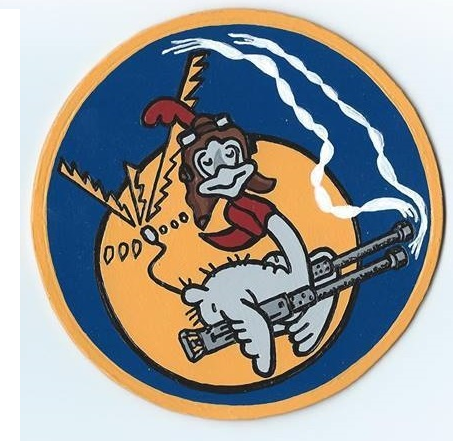
- Unofficial 550th Night Fighter Squadron emblem (variation)

The 550th Fighter Squadron is an active United States Air Force unit. Its current assignment is with 56th Operations Group, at Kingsley Field, Oregon.

The unit was originally formed as the 550th Night Fighter Squadron in 1944. After training, it was deployed to Thirteenth Air Force and ordered to the Netherlands East Indies to provide air defense interceptor protection against Japanese night air raids on American airfields. It later served in the Philippines Campaign where in addition to night interceptor missions it also flew day and night air interdiction missions against enemy troop movements, bridges and other targets of opportunity. It was inactivated in 1946.

The squadron was later activated in the Cold War as a McDonnell F-4 Phantom II Replacement Training Unit (RTU) at Luke Air Force Base, Arizona. It later transitioned to the McDonnell Douglas F-15A Eagle in the late 1970s continuing the RTU mission at Luke. It also performed interceptor training for Air Defense, Tactical Air Command pilots who flew the F-15 as an interceptor for NORAD committed units. It became a RTU for the F-15E Strike Eagle before being inactivated in 1995 when the F-15 was phased out from Luke after 21 years. In 2017, it was reactivated as a training squadron flying the F-15C based with the Oregon Air National Guard in Oregon.

== History ==
=== World War II ===
The squadron was established on 1 June 1944 as the 550th Night Fighter Squadron at Hammer Field, California. It was the last night fighter squadron organized by the Army Air Forces. All later night fighter training was for replacement pilots of existing units. It trained at various airfields in the San Joaquin Valley and was ready to deploy into combat by August.

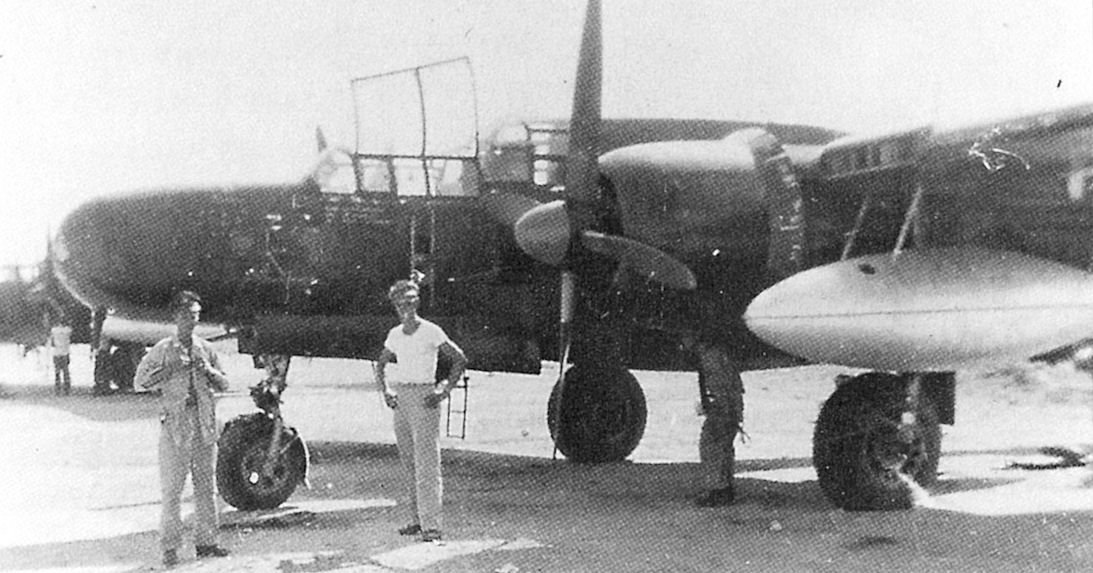
550th Night Fighter Squadron P-61 Black Widow carrying 310 gallon external wing tanks

Assigned to Thirteenth Air Force, arriving at Hollandia Airfield in the Netherlands East Indies part of New Guinea in December 1944. The squadron deployed to forward bases at Middleburg Airfield and Wama Airfield, but during 1945 aerial targets became increasingly rare, and the squadron turned to long range night-time intruding, carrying out the same mission as the aircraft they had originally been stalking, the P-61's long range enabled attacks on Japanese targets as far as the Philippines.

The unit moved to newly established bases in the Philippines in March, and the 550th began flying a number of direct infantry support missions, helping with the battle on Negros. Aircraft were modified in the field to accommodate 5-inch High Velocity Aircraft Rockets (HVAR). Rockets were used in the squadron's night intruder missions. It performed joint operations with the 418th Night Fighter Squadron during the invasion of Balikpapan on the east coast of Borneo in late June 1945; staging out of Sanga Sanga in the Sulu Archipelago. Performed pre-invasion intruder strikes, expending large numbers of 5-inch HVARS, and performing night air defense over the invasion Naval task force.

Combat ended by the end of July. Squadron personnel were largely released from service after the end of the war. In September, the squadron's aircraft were sent to Okinawa for reassignment. The squadron was inactivated in California in early 1946.

=== Replacement training ===
The squadron was redesignated the 550th Tactical Fighter Training Squadron and reactivated in 1970 at Luke Air Force Base, Arizona as a McDonnell F-4C Phantom II Replacement Training Unit (RTU), taking over the assets of the 4517th Combat Crew Training Squadron. Squadron aircraft carried tail code "LA" with a red fin cap. The task of the 550th was to take experienced pilots and weapon systems officers and train them to fly the F-4 as one of the main providers of fighter pilots for Tactical Air Command and fighter forces worldwide.

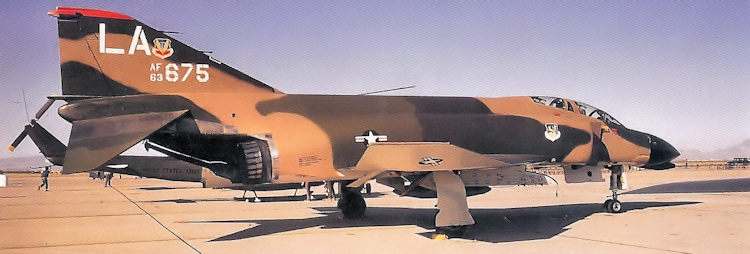
McDonnell F-4C-21-MC Phantom 63-7675 - 550th TFTS, March 1972

The 58th Tactical Training Wing served as the RTU for McDonnell Douglas F-15A Eagle operations during the initial phases of the introduction of the Eagle into service. The wing received its first TF-15A Eagle in November 1974, however problems with the reliability of the plane's Pratt & Whitney F100 engines led to the 550th not being equipped with the aircraft until 1977. The improved F-15C and D models arrived in 1982 for pilot training.

In the late 1980s, the McDonnell Douglas F-15E Strike Eagle ground attack version of the F-15 arrived at Luke, and the 550th was equipped with the new aircraft in March 1989, aircraft carrying a white fin cap. Once qualified the crews were then relocated to an operational squadron at the 4th Tactical Fighter Wing at Seymour Johnson Air Force Base, North Carolina. The squadron was inactivated in November 1991 as part of the phasedown of F-15 training at Luke.

However, the 555th Fighter Squadron stationed at Luke moved to Aviano Air Base, Italy in April 1994 as part of reorganization involving both United States Air Forces Europe and Air Combat Command. In its place the 550th Fighter Squadron was reactivated as an F-15E RTU squadron in March, assuming the 555th's aircraft and personnel, with the aircraft carrying black tail stripe with silver wings. However, by 1994 all F-15 air defense training had been concentrated at Tyndall Air Force Base, Florida, with the resident Luke F-15 Eagle squadrons reduced to just the 461st and 550th Fighter Squadrons flying the F-15E Strike Eagle. Looking at the costs made and efficiency it was decided to be much more cost effective to make the 58th Operations Group an all General Dynamics F-16 Fighting Falcon group. Therefore, it was decided that Strike Eagle training at Luke was to cease with assets transferred to the 4th Fighter Wing.

In late 1994 the F-15Es from the 550th started leaving Luke, and being reassigned to the newly formed 333d Fighter Squadron at Seymour Johnson. The last crews graduated at Luke in February 1995 and the last F-15E left Luke in March closing an era of 21 years of F-15s there. The 550th was inactivated on 31 March.

=== Associate training unit ===
In 2017, the 550th 'Silver Eagles' was reactivated to be part of the Total Force Integration (TFI) program. TFI is an acronym used to describe a military organization which has both reserve and active component members working side by side in the same organization for a common mission. They replaced Detachment 2, 56th Operations Group at Kingsley Field, Oregon.

The TFI was initiated after the Chief of Staff of the Air Force directed increased production of F-15C pilots. To achieve this goal the Air Force recognized the need for additional aircraft and manpower at the 173rd Fighter Wing, the sole Boeing F-15C Eagle training base for the USAF.

550th Fighter Squadron members fall under the command of the 56th Operations Group at Luke Air Force Base, Arizona, but operate out of Kingsley Field alongside the Oregon Air National Guard. The program is designed to bolster Kingsley's mission with additional Air Force active duty airmen stationed at the Air National Guard base in order to increase the number of pilots trained in a given period of time.

== Lineage ==
- Constituted as the 550th Night Fighter Squadron on 3 May 1944

Activated on 1 June 1944
Inactivated on 4 January 1946

- Redesignated 550th Tactical Fighter Training Squadron on 12 January 1970

Activated on 18 January 1970
Redesignated 550th Fighter Squadron on 1 November 1991
Inactivated on 14 November 1991

- Activated on 25 March 1994

Inactivated 31 March 1995

- Activated on 3 April 2017

=== Assignments ===
- Fourth Air Force, 1 June 1944 (attached to 319th Wing until 2 November 1944)
- Thirteenth Air Force, 2 December 1944
- XIII Fighter Command, 12 December 1944 – 4 December 1945 (attached to XIII Bomber Command 14 February 1945, 85th Fighter Wing 7 April–June 1945)
- 58th Tactical Fighter Training Wing (later 58th Tactical Training Wing), 18 January 1970
- 405th Tactical Training Wing, 29 August 1979
- 58th Operations Group, 1 October – 14 November 1991
- 58th Operations Group, 25 March 1994
- 56th Operations Group, 1 April 1994 – 31 March 1995
- 56th Operations Group, 3 April 2017

=== Stations ===
- Hammer Field, California, 1 June 1944
- Visalia Army Air Field, California, 25 August – 2 November 1944
- Hollandia Airfield Netherlands East Indies, 14 December 1944

Detachment operated from Middleburg Airfield, Netherlands East Indies, 31 December 1944 – 14 February 1945

- Wama Airfield, Morotai, Netherlands East Indies, 14 February 1945

Detachment operated from Tacloban Airfield, Leyte, Philippines, 8 March – 7 April 1945

- Tacloban Airfield, Leyte, Philippines, 7 April – 4 December 1945

Detachments operated from San Roque Airfield, Mindanao, Philippines, 27 April – 17 June 1945; Sanga Sanga Airfield, Sulu, Philippines, 28 May - August 1945; Puerto Princesa Airfield, Palawan, Philippines 9–19 June 1945

- Camp Stoneman, California, 3–4 January 1946
- Luke Air Force Base, Arizona, 18 January 1970 – 30 November 1991
- Luke Air Force Base, Arizona, 25 March 1994 – 31 March 1995
- Kingsley Field, Oregon, 3 April 2017 – present

=== Aircraft ===
- Beechcraft AT-10 Wichita, 1944
- Vultee BT-13 Valiant, 1944
- Lockheed P-38 Lightning, 1945
- Douglas P-70 Havoc, 1945
- Northrop YP-61 Black Widow, 1945
- Northrop P-61 Black Widow, 1945
- McDonnell F-4C Phantom II, 1971–1977
- McDonnell F-15A Eagle, 1977–1982
- McDonnell F-15B Eagle, 1977–1982
- McDonnell (later Boeing) F-15C Eagle, 1982–1989, 2017–present
- McDonnell (later Boeing F-15D Eagle, 1982–1989, 2017–present
- McDonnell Douglas F-15E Strike Eagle, 1989–1995

== See also ==
- 481st Night Fighter Operational Training Group
