= Berry Airfield =

Former airbase near Port Moresby, Papua New Guinea

Berry Airfield 12-Mile Drome
- Part of Fifth Air Force
- Located near Port Moresby, Papua New Guinea Berry Airfield (Papua New Guinea)

Site information
- Type: Military Airfield
- Controlled by: United States Army Air Forces

Location
- Coordinates: 09°23′19.78″S 147°14′42.82″E

Site history
- Built: 1944
- In use: 1944

Berry Airfield (also known as 12-Mile Drome) is a former World War II airfield near Port Moresby, Papua New Guinea. It was part of a multiple-airfield complex in the Port Moresby area, located 19 kilometres (12 mi) inland from Port Moresby.

Also known as "12 Mile Drome" or "Bomana Drome", the airfield was named "Berry Airfield" in honor of P-39D 41-7165 pilot Major Jack W. Berry on November 10, 1942.

== History ==
Berry Airfield was completed on May 15, 1943, however, there was little or no room for expansion without an extensive earth-moving project being put into action. The runway had an base of crushed rock and pit gravel approximately 200 millimetres (8 in) and was 1,372 by 46 m (4,500 by 150 ft). It also had 40 dispersal bays, and 4 alert areas that would accommodate 15 fighter aircraft.

Berry hosted many units during its operational use, however, the only long-term unit assigned was the 8th Fighter Squadron (49th Fighter Group) which flew P-39 Airacobras from July 20, 1942 - November 8, 1942.

Today, the road from Port Moresby runs over the top of the old main runway. The Bomana Police Training College is located at the site of the former strip, and the Bomana War Cemetery is at the far end of the strip. Some of the officer's and command tents for the airfield were located in the high ground around the former field. Some war debris is scattered around the area, including barrels, metal pieces, and other objects.

== See also ==
- USAAF in the Southwest Pacific
- Port Moresby Airfield Complex

Kila Airfield (3 Mile Drome)
Wards Airfield (5 Mile Drome)
Jackson Airfield (7 Mile Drome)

Schwimmer Airfield (14 Mile Drome)
Durand Airfield (17 Mile Drome)
Rogers (Rarona) Airfield (30 Mile Drome)
Fishermans (Daugo Island) Airfield
