= V Fighter Command =

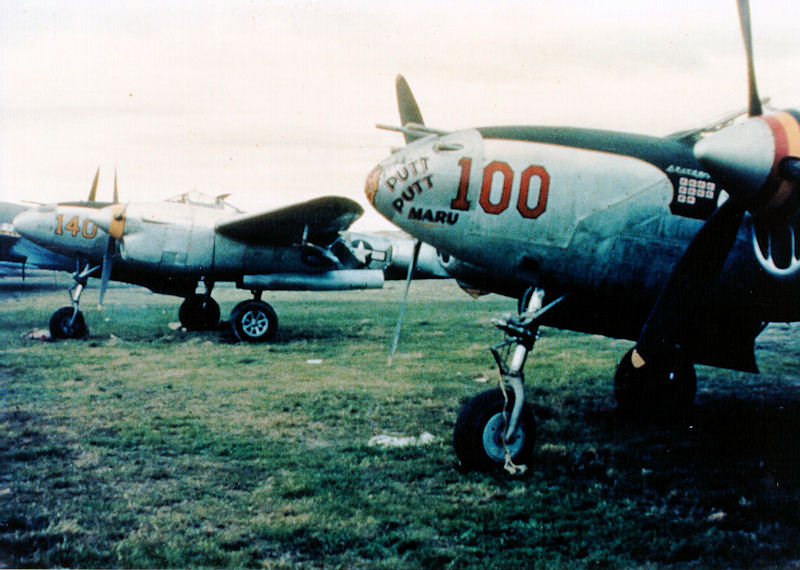
- P-38 Lightnings of the command's 475th Fighter Group
- Active: 1941–1946
- Country: United States
- Branch: United States Army; United States Air Force
- Role: Command of fighter units
- Part of: Fifth Air Force
- Engagements: Southwest Pacific Theater
- Decorations: Distinguished Unit Citation; Philippine Presidential Unit Citation

The V Fighter Command is a disbanded United States Air Force headquarters. It was established as the 2nd Interceptor Command in June 1941, with responsibility for air defense of the northwest United States and training fighter units in its area of responsibility. Shortly after the attack on Pearl Harbor, the Army formed Western Defense Command, with responsibility for the entire Pacific coast. All air defense functions were transferred to 4th Interceptor Command, and the command was slated for transfer to the Southwest Pacific Theater as 5th Fighter Command.

The command moved to Australia, where it was assigned to Fifth Air Force. The command controlled fighter forces, moving forward through New Guinea and the Philippines. On V-J Day it was located on Okinawa. In the fall of 1945, it moved to Fukuoka Air Base, where it served in the occupation forces in Japan until it was inactivated on 31 May 1946.

== History ==
=== Background ===
GHQ Air Force (GHQ, AF) had been established with two major combat functions, to maintain a striking force against long range targets, and the air defense of the United States. In the spring of 1941, the War Department established four strategic defense areas and GHQ, AF reorganized its Northwest Air District as 2nd Air Force with responsibility for air defense planning and organization in the western and northwestern mountains. 2nd Air Force activated 2nd Interceptor Command at Fort George Wright, Washington on 4 June 1941, under the command of Brigadier General Carlyle N. Walsh. Two weeks later, the command moved to Fort Lawton, Washington.

=== Initial operations in the United States ===
The attack on Pearl Harbor put all units in the Western Theater of Operations on heightened alert. The command was charged with control of "active agents" for air defense in its area of responsibility, which included interceptor aircraft, antiaircraft artillery and barrage balloons. Civilian organizations provided air raid warnings and enforced blackouts and came under the authority of the Office of Civilian Defense. Radar was initially not sufficiently developed to be included in air defense systems, There were only ten radars to guard the Pacific coast, but the command worked "feverishly" to create a ground observer corps and coastal radar net as elements of its Aircraft Warning Service.

However, it soon became apparent that having two commands responsible for air defense in the Western Theater of Operations was impractical and 4th Interceptor Command was given responsibility for air defense of the entire Pacific coast of the United States, with the 2nd focusing on training. However, 2nd Air Force was assuming a primary mission of training heavy bomber units, and had little need for a fighter organization. In fact, what was now the 2nd Fighter Command had been without any operational fighter components since early 1942. Therefore it was decided that the command would deploy to the Pacific as the fighter headquarters for 5th Air Force, and it was reassigned and redesignated 5th Fighter Command in late August 1942.

=== Operations in the Pacific ===
In November 1942, V Fighter Command had deployed to Australia to become the primary command and control organization for Fifth Air Force, fighter units operating primarily in the Southwest Pacific Theater. Its assigned units fought in the Fifth Air Force Area of Responsibility flying cover missions for convoys, patrols, escorted bombers, attacked enemy airfields, and supported ground forces.

Afterward, V Fighter Command served with the occupation force in Japan before being inactivated in 1946. In September 1947, the command was transferred to the United States Air Force (USAF) in inactive status. A year later, in October 1948, USAF disbanded the command.

== Lineage ==
- Constituted as 2nd Interceptor Command on 26 May 1941 (Note: Maurer indicates unit was constituted as the "II" Interceptor Command. However, the unit was constituted and activated with an arabic number in its name. The use of roman numerals to designate Army Air Forces combat commands did not begin until September 1942. "Air Force Historical Research Agency Organizational Reconds: Types of USAF Organizations". Air Force History Index. 9 January 2008.)
- Activated on 4 June 1941
- Redesignated 2nd Fighter Command on 15 May 1942
- Redesignated 5th Fighter Command c. 28 August 1942
- Redesignated V Fighter Command c. 18 September 1942
- Inactivated on 31 May 1946
- Disbanded on 8 October 1948 (Note: The command was transferred to the United States Air Force in inactive status, when the Air force was established in September 1947. The Air Force disbanded it a year later.)

=== Assignments ===
- Second Air Force, 4 June 1941 (Note: Cate & Williams, p. 154 and "Abstract, History 2 Air Force, Dec 1941-Dec 1942". Air Force History Index. each mention assignment to 2nd Air Force, but do not give dates. Maurer omits assignment prior to the command's deployment to the Pacific.)
- Fifth Air Force, 25 August 1942 – 31 May 46

=== Components ===
==== Groups ====
- 3rd Air Commando Group: c. 13–c. 18 December 1944; c. 11 May 1945 – 25 March 1946 (under operational control of 308th Bombardment Wing to 28 May 1945; of 309th Bombardment Wing to c. 8 August 1945 and after c. 27 October 1945)
- 8th Fighter Group: November 1942 – c. 31 May 1946
- 35th Fighter Group: 11 November 1942 – 19 April 1944; 11 May – 10 November 1945
- 38th Bombardment Group: 1 August 1942 – 22 November 1945
- 42nd Bombardment Group: 25 March – 10 May 1946
- 49th Fighter Group: 11 November 1942 – 19 April 1944; 11–21 August 1944; 8 December 1944 – 10 November 1945
- 54th Pursuit Group: 4 June 1941 – 31 January 1942 (Note: Haulman gives the date of assignment as 18 April 1942. However, this is before the 2nd Interceptor Command was activated, and probably includes assignment to the Interceptor Command, 2nd Air Force, a predecessor unit that was active at March Field from about April until being disbanded when it was replaced by 2nd Interceptor Command.)
- 55th Pursuit Group: 2 October 1941 – 5 January 1942
- 58th Fighter Group: by 6 March – 23 November 1945
- 312th Bombardment Group: 19 November 1943 – 16 January 1944
- 475th Fighter Group: 14 May 1943 – 16 June 1944 (attached to First Air Task Force c. 14 August 1943; 308th Bombardment Wing 1 February – 24 March 1944; 310th Bombardment Wing after c. 14 May 1944); 18 May 1945 – c. 1 February 1946 (attached to 309th Bombardment Wing 29 May – c. August 1945; 308th Bombardment Wing c. 23 September 1945 – 1 January 1946)

==== Squadrons ====
- 9th Tactical Air Communications Squadron: 25 July – 20 October 1945
- 25th Tactical Reconnaissance Squadron: attached 10 February 1946, assigned 27 April – 31 May 1946
- 36th Photographic Reconnaissance Squadron: 29 November – 3 December 1945
- 159th Liaison Squadron: 25 March – 31 May 1946
- 418th Night Fighter Squadron: 15 November 1943 – 20 March 1946 (attached to First Air Task Force 22 November 1943; 308th Bombardment Wing, 1 February 1944; 310th Bombardment Wing c. 15 May 1944; Thirteenth Air Force, 10 November 1944; 310th Bombardment Wing, 26 December 1944 – 30 January 1945; V Bomber Command after 10 November 1945)
- 421st Night Fighter Squadron: 29 December 1943 – c. 1 February 1945 (detached); April 1945 – 1 February 1946
- 460th Fighter Squadron: 14 July – 23 September 1944
- 547th Night Fighter Squadron: assigned 30 September – 10 October 1944, attached until November 1944; assigned 15 May 1945 – 20 February 1946 (attached to 310th Bombardment Wing 22 October 1945; V Bomber Command after 10 November 1945)

=== Stations ===
- Fort George Wright, Washington, 4 June 1941
- Fort Lawton, Washington, 19 June 1941 – 2 October 1942
- RAAF Base Townsville, Australia, November – December 1942
- Wards Airfield (5 Mile Drome), Port Moresby, December 1942
- Nadzab Airfield, New Guinea, January 1944
- Owi Airfield, Schouten Islands, Netherlands East Indies, July 1944
- Bayug Airfield, Leyte, Philippines, November 1944
- McGuire Field, Mindoro, Philippines, January 1945
- Clark Field, Luzon, Philippines, March 1945
- Hamasaki (Motobu Airfield), Okinawa, August 1945
- Itazuke Air Base, Japan, October 1945-31 May 1946

== See also ==
- United States Army Air Forces in Australia
