= Kila Airfield =

Kila Airfield Kila Kila Airfield 3-Mile Drome
- Part of Fifth Air Force
- Located near Port Moresby, Papua New Guinea Kila Airfield (Papua New Guinea)

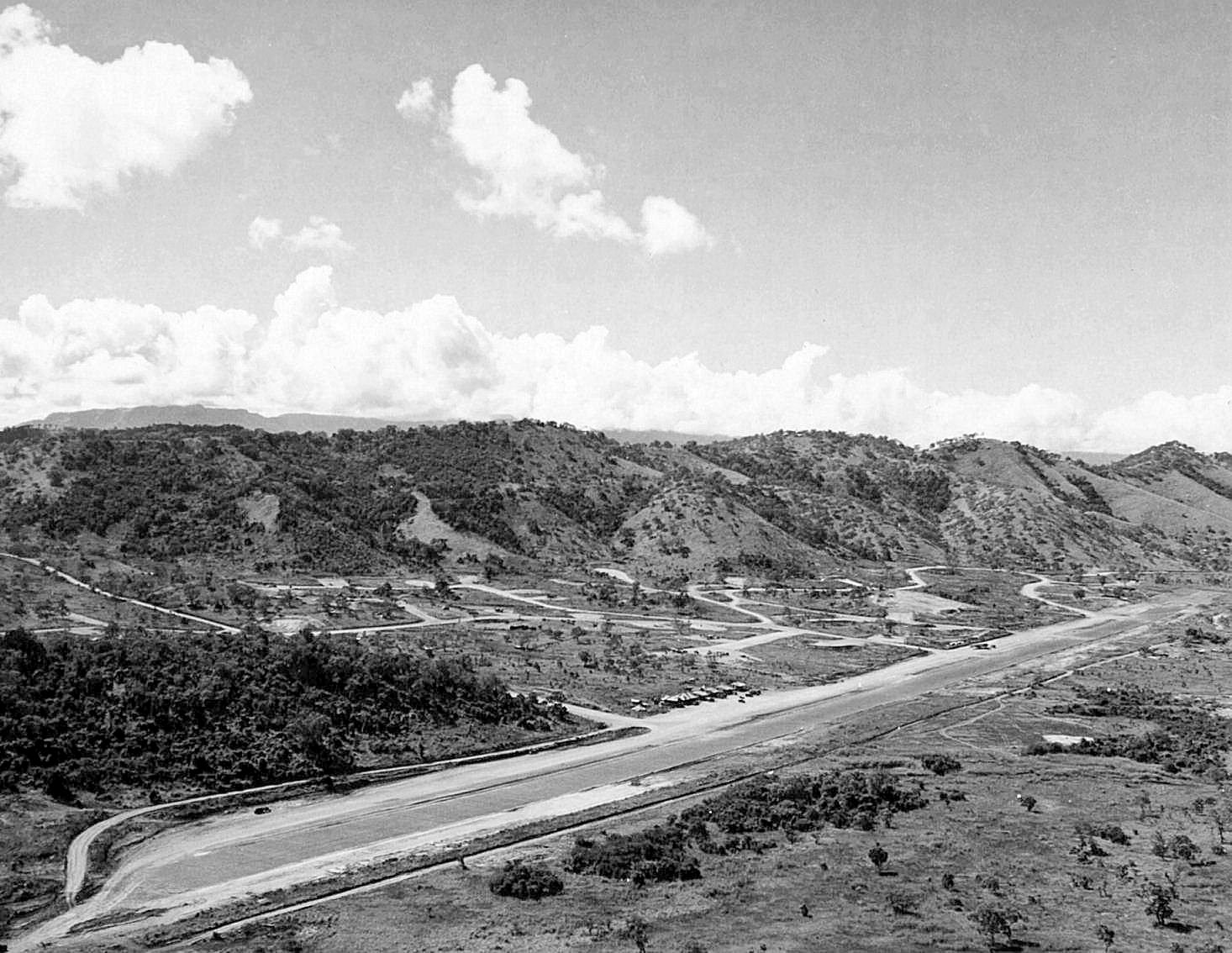

Site information
- Type: Military airfield
- Controlled by: United States Army Air Forces

Location
- Coordinates: 09°29′24.92″S 147°11′31.19″E

Site history
- Built: 1944
- In use: 1944

Kila Airfield (also known as Kila Kila Airfield and 3-Mile Drome) is a former World War II airfield near Port Moresby, Papua New Guinea. It was part of a multiple-airfield complex in the Port Moresby area, located north of Joyce Bay, three miles from the town of Port Moresby near the village of Kila Kila.

The airfield was Port Moresby's first civilian airfield, built in 1933 by the Australian administration.

== History ==
The airport was used by the Americans beginning in 1942 and expanded into an airfield for fighters, light bombers and service aircraft. Many USAAF squadrons were briefly stationed at the airfield during the war, and major units assigned to Kila were:

- Headquarters, 3d Bombardment Group (January 28 – May 20, 1943)

8th Bomb Squadron, A-20 Havoc
13th Bomb Squadron, A-20 Havoc
89th Bomb Squadron, A-20 Havoc
90th Bomb Squadron, A-20 Havoc

- 8th Fighter Squadron (49th Fighter Group), 25 September-15 April 1943, P-39 Airacobra
- 80th Fighter Squadron (8th Fighter Group), 21 March-11 December 1943, P-39 Airacobra

A large hill on the approach to the field limited its usefulness. The runway was 1,524 m × 30 m (5,000 ft × 100 ft) surfaced with black loam with marston matting (as of 8 October 1943). A dispersal area with revetments and taxiways was located on the northern side of the runway. Several buildings were located at the center of the runway.

After the war the airfield was returned to the New Guinea government. Today the airfield is now part of the Kila Police Barracks, a golf course and a technical school. Some of the wartime revetments remain on the police property and portions of the wartime taxiways and runway are visible.

== See also ==
- USAAF in the Southwest Pacific
- Port Moresby Airfield Complex

Wards Airfield (5 Mile Drome)
Jackson Airfield (7 Mile Drome)
Berry Airfield (12 Mile Drome)

Schwimmer Airfield (14 Mile Drome)
Durand Airfield (17 Mile Drome)
Rogers (Rarona) Airfield (30 Mile Drome)
Fishermans (Daugo Island) Airfield
