= Schwimmer Airfield =

Schwimmer Airfield 14-Mile Drome
- Part of Fifth Air Force
- Located near Port Moresby, Papua New Guinea Schwimmer Airfield (Papua New Guinea)

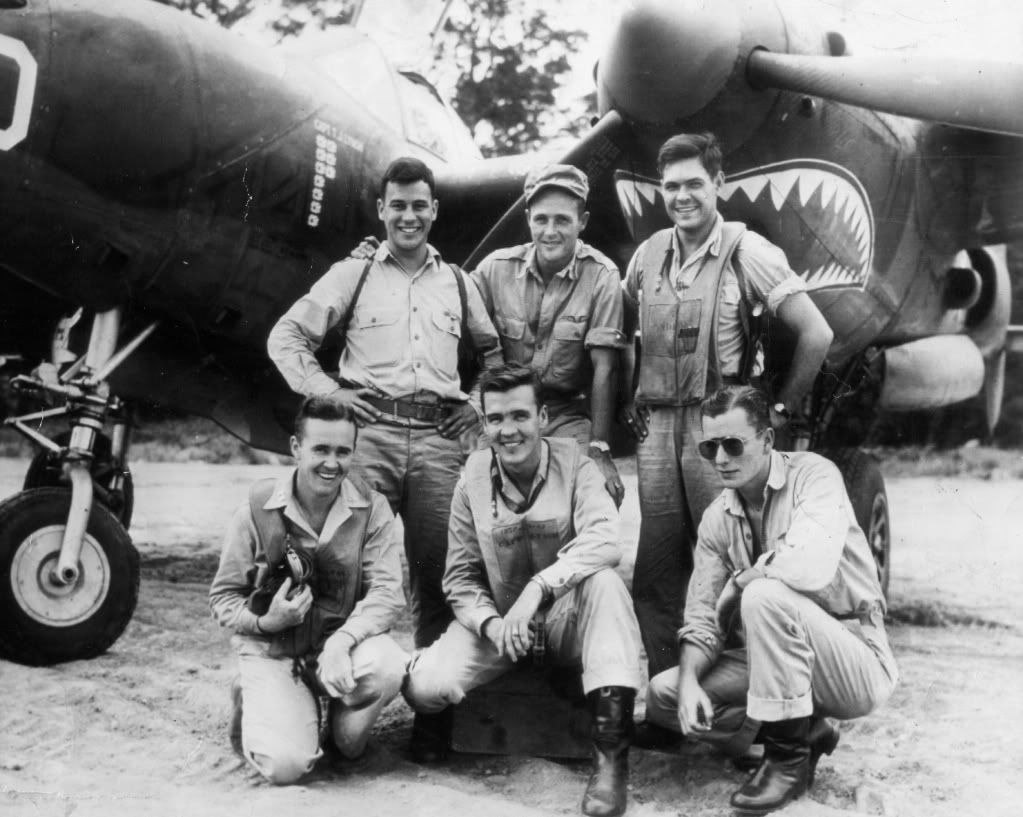
- Flying aces of the 39th Fighter Squadron at Schwimmer Airfield in May 1943. Kneeling, from left: Charles P. O'Sullivan, Thomas J. Lynch, Kenneth C. Sparks. Standing, from left: Richard C. Suehr, John H. Lane, Stanley O. Andrews.

Site information
- Type: Military airfield
- Controlled by: United States Army Air Forces

Location
- Coordinates: 09°22′25.56″S 147°13′56.82″E

Site history
- Built: 1944
- In use: 1944

Schwimmer Airfield (also known as 14-Mile Drome) is a former World War II airfield near Port Moresby, Papua New Guinea. It was part of a multiple-airfield complex in the Port Moresby area, located north of the Laloki River.

The airfield was known as 14 mile for its distance from Port Moresby, and also known as 'Laloki' or 'Lakoki Drome' for the river to the northwest of the airstrip. It was officially renamed "Schwimmer Airfield" on November 10, 1942, in honor of Charles Schwimmer, who was lost in his Bell P-39 Airacobra intercepting Japanese aircraft over Port Moresby.

== History ==
Schwimmer Airfield was built by the US Army in early 1942 with a single runway 1,600 metres (5,300 ft) long and 30 metres (100 ft) wide. Around October 1942 it was re-surfaced with Marston Matting. No revetments were built but the taxiway and parking areas were dispersed to the north of the runway in a semicircle. The crews lived in pyramid tents 800 metres (0.5 mi) from the strip in scrub trees.

Many units were rotated in and out of the airfield during its use. The major units assigned were:

- 13th Bombardment Squadron (3d Bombardment Group), B-25 Mitchells
- 9th Fighter Squadron (49th Fighter Group), P-40 Warhawk
- 39th Fighter Squadron (35th Fighter Group). P-39 Airacobras; P-38 Lightnings

The airfield was closed after the war and today there is little evidence remaining of the facility. Houses have been built along much of the former runway area. The rest is overgrown and abandoned. Some wartime debris litter the area. Bomb storage bays are visible from the road.

== See also ==
- USAAF in the Southwest Pacific
- Port Moresby Airfield Complex
- Kila Airfield (3 Mile Drome)
- Wards Airfield (5 Mile Drome)
- Jackson Airfield (7 Mile Drome)
- Berry Airfield (12 Mile Drome)
- Durand Airfield (17 Mile Drome)
- Rogers (Rarona) Airfield (30 Mile Drome)
- Fishermans (Daugo Island) Airfield
