= Rogers Airfield =

Rogers Airfield 30-Mile Drome
- Part of Fifth Air Force
- Located near Port Moresby, Papua New Guinea Rogers Airfield (Papua New Guinea)

Site information
- Type: Military airfield
- Controlled by: United States Army Air Forces

Location
- Coordinates: 09°02′37.12″S 146°53′40.32″E

Site history
- Built: 1942
- In use: 1942

Rogers Airfield (also known as 30-Mile Drome) is a former World War II airfield near Redscar Bay, Papua New Guinea. It was part of a multiple-airfield complex in the Port Moresby area, located 30 miles (48 km) north-west of Port Moresby by air, near Rorona (also spelled Rarona).

On November 15, 1942, the airfield was named in honor of Major Floyd "Buck" W. Rogers (C.O. of 3rd BG, 8th BS) who was KIA flying A-24 41-15797.

== History ==
Rogers Airfield was built by American forces in mid-1942, and in use by the first week of June. The airfield served as both a crash strip and also based aircraft for short periods in the early stages of the war. Known units based at Rogers were:

- Headquarters, 35th Fighter Group (July 22, 1942 – August 15, 1943)

39th Fighter Squadron, P-39 Airacobra
40th Fighter Squadron, P-39 Airacobra
41st Fighter Squadron, P-39 Airacobra

- 7th Fighter Squadron (49th Fighter Group) P-40 Warhawk

After the war Rogers Field was used as a small commercial airport by Air Niugini. Its commercial use ended in the 1960s and today the airfield is unused.

== See also ==
- USAAF in the Southwest Pacific
- Port Moresby Airfield Complex

Kila Airfield (3 Mile Drome)
Wards Airfield (5 Mile Drome)
Jackson Airfield (7 Mile Drome)
Berry Airfield (12 Mile Drome)

Schwimmer Airfield (14 Mile Drome)
Durand Airfield (17 Mile Drome)
Fishermans (Daugo Island) Airfield
