= Durand Airfield =

Durand Airfield 17-Mile Drome
- Part of Fifth Air Force
- Located near Port Moresby, Papua New Guinea Durand Airfield (Papua New Guinea)

Site information
- Type: Military airfield
- Controlled by: United States Army Air Forces

Location
- Coordinates: 09°22′57.35″S 147°10′23.76″E

Site history
- Built: 1944
- In use: 1944

Durand Airfield (also known as 17-Mile Drome) is a former World War II airfield near Port Moresby, Papua New Guinea. It was part of a multiple-airfield complex in the Port Moresby area, located 17 miles (27 km) from Port Moresby, to the north of the Waigani swamp.

The airfield was known as '17 Mile' or sometimes 'Waigani'. Waigani swamp is located at the end of the airfield. Pilots feared crashing into during bad take offs or landings under the belief there were crocodiles in it. On November 10, 1942 it was officially renamed "Durand Airfield" to honor of MIA P-39 pilot Edward D. Durand missing on a mission against Lae.

== History ==
Durand Airfield consisted of a single main runway, running roughly NW-SE, being constructed by the 808th Airborne Engineers, and completed in August 1942. The runway was separate from the dispersal and camp areas, where revetments were carved into hillsides and taxiways elevated for drainage. Gun pits built of 55 gallon drums for anti-aircraft were built on the surrounding hills, and buildings on concrete slabs, or tents on gravel from the nearby quarry.

Many squadrons rotated in and out of the Airfield during its peak usage. Major units assigned to the station were:

- Headquarters, 38th Bomb Group (October 1942 – March 4, 1944)

71st Bomb Squadron, B-25 Mitchell
405th Bomb Squadron, B-25 Mitchell
822nd Bomb Squadron, B-25 Mitchell
823rd Bomb Squadron, B-25 Mitchell

- 13th Bombardment Squadron (3rd Attack Group), B-25 Mitchell
- 90th Bombardment Squadron (3rd Attack Group), B-25 Mitchell
- 499th Bombardment Squadron (345th Bomb Group), B-25 Mitchell
- 7th Fighter Squadron (49th Fighter Group), P-39 Airacobra

The airstrip was active during late 1942 and all of 1943 as a front-line base, It became a rear area when units moved forward to the Dobodura area.

As the airfield was located some distance from Port Moresby, the airfield has remained relatively isolated and disused since the war. There are no settlements on the airfield, only occasionally do people pass through the area searching for firewood or hunting. The runway, revetments and taxiway system are still present, but only clearly visible in the dry season when the grass has been burned away.

== See also ==
- USAAF in the Southwest Pacific
- Port Moresby Airfield Complex

Kila Airfield (3 Mile Drome)
Wards Airfield (5 Mile Drome)
Jackson Airfield (7 Mile Drome)
Berry Airfield (12 Mile Drome)

Schwimmer Airfield (14 Mile Drome)
Rogers (Rarona) Airfield (30 Mile Drome)
Fishermans (Daugo Island) Airfield
