= Wards Airfield =

Wards Airfield 5-Mile Drome
- Part of Fifth Air Force
- Located near Port Moresby, Papua New Guinea Wards Airfield (Papua New Guinea)

Site information
- Type: Military airfield
- Controlled by: United States Army Air Forces

Location
- Coordinates: 09°25′48.74″S 147°10′55.53″E

Site history
- Built: 1944
- In use: 1944

Wards Airfield is a former World War II airfield near Port Moresby, Papua New Guinea. The airfield was abandoned after the war and was developed into the Waigani area of Port Moresby.

The airfield was named in honor of Australian Lt. Col. K. H. Ward, who was involved with its construction and was KIA on 27 August 1942, during the fighting at Isurava on the Kokoda Trail. It was also known as "5-Mile or 5-Mile Drome" by Americans, for its distance from Port Moresby.

== History ==
Wards Airfield (Ward's Strip) was built for heavy bombers and transport planes. By 1943, it was the busiest aerodrome in the southern hemisphere. Mainly used for cargo aircraft and larger planes, Ward's was nearest to Jackson Airfield (7 Mile Drome), and at its height, its taxiways actually connected with those of 7-mile.

The major operational organization at Wards Airfield was the Headquarters, 54th Troop Carrier Wing (3 May 1943 – 18 April 1944). Operational C-47 Skytrain groups and squadrons assigned to the airfield were:

- 317th Troop Carrier Group (30 September 1943 – April 1944)
- 374th Troop Carrier Wing (December 1942 – 7 October 1943)
- 375th Troop Carrier Group (December 1942 – 7 October 1943)
- 6th Troop Carrier Squadron, 13 October 1942 – 2 October 1943
- 21st Troop Carrier Squadron, 18 February – 28 September 1943
- 22d Troop Carrier Squadron, 24 January – 4 October 1943
- 33d Troop Carrier Squadron, 28 December 1942 – 5 October 1943

Several Reconnaissance groups were assigned to Wards to support Fifth Air Force operations:

- 6th Reconnaissance Group (10 December 1943 – 17 February 1944)
- 71st Reconnaissance Group (7 November 1943 – 20 January 1944)

In addition the 90th Bombardment Group also based two B-24 Liberator squadrons at the airfield.

- 320th Bombardment Squadron, 10 February – December 1943
- 321st Bombardment Squadron, 10 February – December 1943

Royal Australian Air Force units stationed at the airfield were the 9th Group, 22nd Squadron (A-20) and 30th Squadron (Beaufighter).

General Kenney's Headquarters, V Fighter Command was located at the airfield between December–January 1942. Reportedly, its cement slab foundations still remain today, located on a hill behind the airfield. A large 5th Air Force insignia and USAAF star, drawn into the concrete. Concrete steps, a garden and path that went up the ridge towards the HQ. In the 1980s traces of the paint still remained. Today, both the 5th AF logo and USAAF are partially broken, and the area is overgrown, but it still offers commanding views and an impressive remnant of the American era at the airfield.

This marking overlooks the Chinese Embassy. To visit the slab, drive down Sir John Guise Drive, cross the intersection with Independence Way and Godwin Street and keep going in the direction of the golf club. When that road begins to make a left turn, there is a hill on your right.

Wards Airfield was also the home of the USAAF 27th Air Depot. This group was responsible for assembling crated aircraft delivered by ship docked in Fairfax Harbor from the United States. Brand new aircraft were delivered to Port Moresby assembled and then flown to other bases. Ships continued to dock at Port Moresby until mid-1945 when transports switched to Manila Bay. For pilots wishing to pick up a brand new plane, they would have to go all the way back to Port Moresby

== Current status ==
One can still drive along the main runway. In the post war years, most of its aircraft revetments were bulldozed flat, and a scrap dealer operated there, melting down aluminum from aircraft remains. Locals would siphon gasoline from the aircraft fuel tanks for their own use well into the 1950s.

== Port Moresby Airfield Complex ==
Kila Airfield (3 Mile Drome)
Jackson Airfield (7 Mile Drome)
Berry Airfield (12 Mile Drome)
Schwimmer Airfield (14 Mile Drome)

Durand Airfield (17 Mile Drome)
Rogers (Rarona) Airfield (30 Mile Drome)
Fishermans (Daugo Island) Airfield

== See also ==
- USAAF in the Southwest Pacific
