= Fishermans Airfield =

Abandoned airport near Port Moresby, Papua New Guinea

Fishermans Airfield Daugo Island Airfield
- Part of Fifth Air Force
- Located near Port Moresby, Papua New Guinea Fishermans Airfield (Papua New Guinea)

Site information
- Type: Military airfield
- Controlled by: United States Army Air Forces

Location
- Coordinates: 09°30′47.64″S 147°03′02.06″E

Site history
- Built: 1944
- In use: 1944

Fishermans Airfield (also known as Daugo Island Airfield) is a former World War II airfield near Port Moresby, Papua New Guinea. It was part of a multiple-airfield complex in the Port Moresby area, located offshore of Port Moresby. The island's name is derived from the names of the island's two villages - Dag (on the western tip) and Ugo (eastern tip). It is also known as Fisherman's Island.

The airfield on the island was built by the RAAF c. 1944 as an emergency airfield. It was abandoned and has been disused since the war.

== See also ==
- USAAF in the Southwest Pacific
- Port Moresby Airfield Complex

Kila Airfield (3 Mile Drome)
Wards Airfield (5 Mile Drome)
Jackson Airfield (7 Mile Drome)
Berry Airfield (12 Mile Drome)
Schwimmer Airfield (14 Mile Drome)
Durand Airfield (17 Mile Drome)
Rogers (Rarona) Airfield (30 Mile Drome)
