= James B. Morehead =

American fighter pilot (1916-2012)

James Bruce Morehead
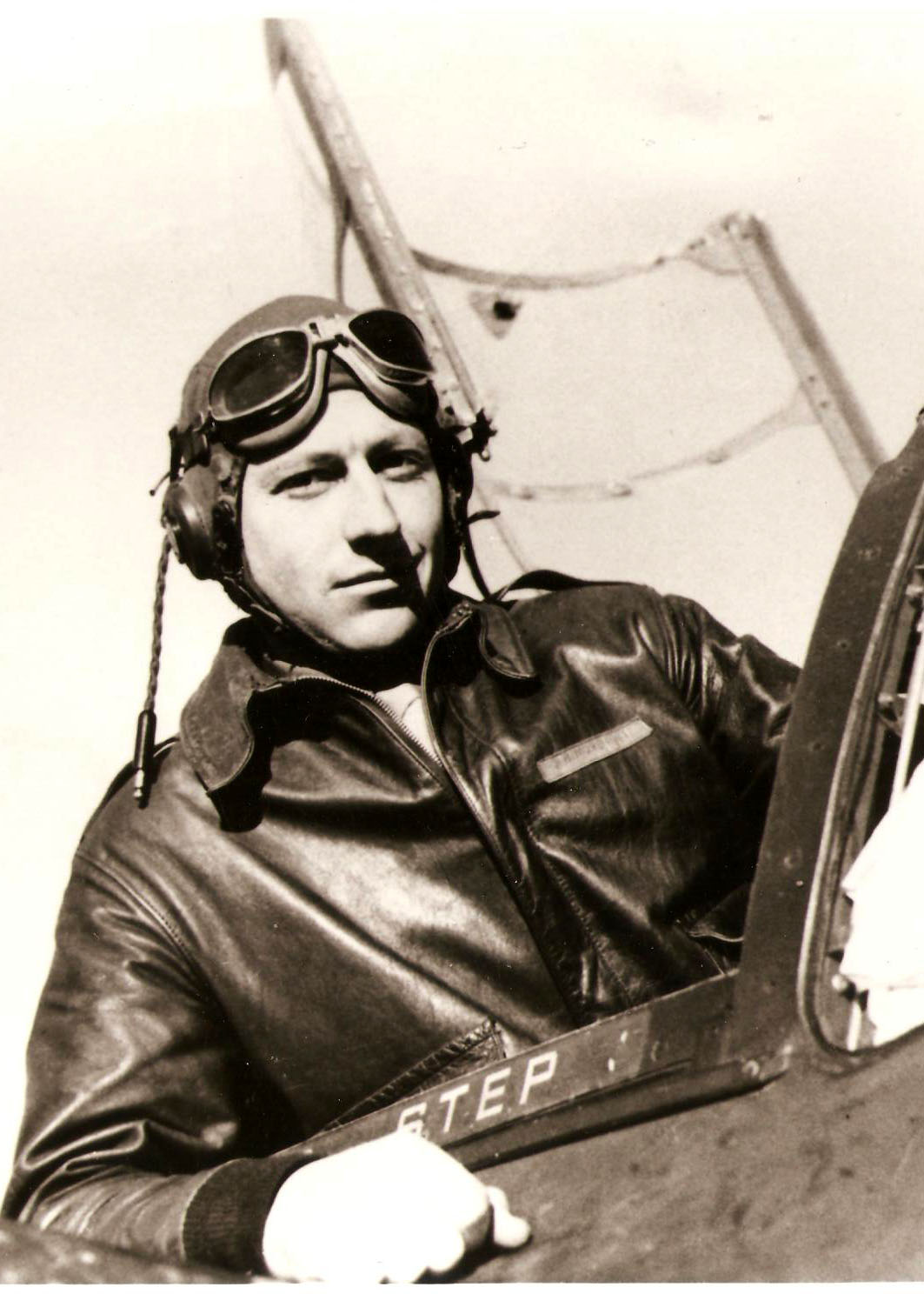
- Born: August 16, 1916; Paoli, Oklahoma, United States
- Died: March 11, 2012 (aged 95); Petaluma, California, United States
- Burial place: Arlington National Cemetery
- Military career
- Allegiance: United States
- Branch: United States Air Force
- Service years: 1940–1967
- Rank: Colonel
- Nickname: "Jim"
- Units: 49th Pursuit Group; 1st Fighter Group; 49th Fighter-Bomber Wing
- Commands: 331st Fighter Squadron; 488th Army Air Force Base Unit
- Conflicts: World War II; Korean War
- Awards: Distinguished Service Cross (2); Silver Star; Distinguished Flying Cross (2); Air Medal (16)

James Bruce Morehead (August 16, 1916 – March 11, 2012) was an American fighter pilot in World War II as a flying ace. He flew combat missions over a three-year span of the war with a total of eight aerial victories. He was awarded two Distinguished Service Crosses, a Silver Star, two Distinguished Flying Crosses and sixteen Air Medals

== Early life ==
Morehead was born on August 16, 1916, in Paoli, Oklahoma.

== Military career ==
=== World War II ===
At the initial outbreak of hostilities, Morehead was recovering from injuries sustained by a mid air collision. In late December after recovery, he joined pilots and support personnel in San Francisco, aboard the USS President Polk, ordered to be sent to the Philippines, but instead diverted to port in Brisbane, Australia as the Japanese threaten the Dutch East Indies and Australia.

He destroyed three enemy aircraft on February 25, 1942 and was awarded his first Distinguished Service Cross for that mission. On April 25, 1942, he destroyed two more enemy aircraft, earning him the flying ace status.

During this time he was credited with the destruction of 7 Japanese aircraft in aerial combat. He received the Distinguished Service Cross, Silver Star and Distinguished Flying Cross for his service in the Pacific Theater.

He received a second Distinguished Service Cross and an additional Distinguished Flying Cross for his service in the European Theater.

His aerial victories during World War II consisted of 8 enemy planes destroyed in the air and 1 damaged. Of his kills, 7 were attained while flying P-40 and one was attained while flying P-38.

His book "In My Sights" is a story of the few who survived the aerial battles against the Southwest Pacific.

=== Aerial Victory credits ===
Date	Location	Credits	Comment
February 25, 1942	Darwin Australia	2	Awarded DFC
April 25, 1942	Pacific Theater of Operations	3	Achieved Ace Status (awarded DSC)
August 23, 1942	Pacific Theater of Operations	2	Awarded Silver Star
June 6, 1944	Romania	1	

== Later life ==
In 1999 he was inducted into the American Combat Airman Hall of Fame.

Morehead died on March 11, 2012. He is buried with full military honors at Arlington National Cemetery.

== Awards and decorations ==
His awards and decorations include:

USAF Command pilot badge
Distinguished Service Cross with bronze oak leaf cluster		Silver Star
Distinguished Flying Cross with bronze oak leaf cluster	Air Medal with silver oak leaf clusters	Air Force Presidential Unit Citation with three bronze oak leaf clusters
American Defense Service Medal with service star	American Campaign Medal	Asiatic-Pacific Campaign Medal with two bronze campaign stars
European–African–Middle Eastern Campaign Medal with three bronze campaign stars	World War II Victory Medal	Army of Occupation Medal
National Defense Service Medal	Korean Service Medal with bronze campaign star	Air Force Longevity Service Award with silver oak leaf cluster
Armed Forces Reserve Medal with bronze hourglass device	Small Arms Expert Marksmanship Ribbon	Philippine Defense Medal
French Croix de Guerre with Palm	Philippine Independence Medal	Philippine Presidential Unit Citation
Republic of Korea Presidential Unit Citation	United Nations Korea Medal	Republic of Korea War Service Medal
