= 419th Night Fighter Squadron =

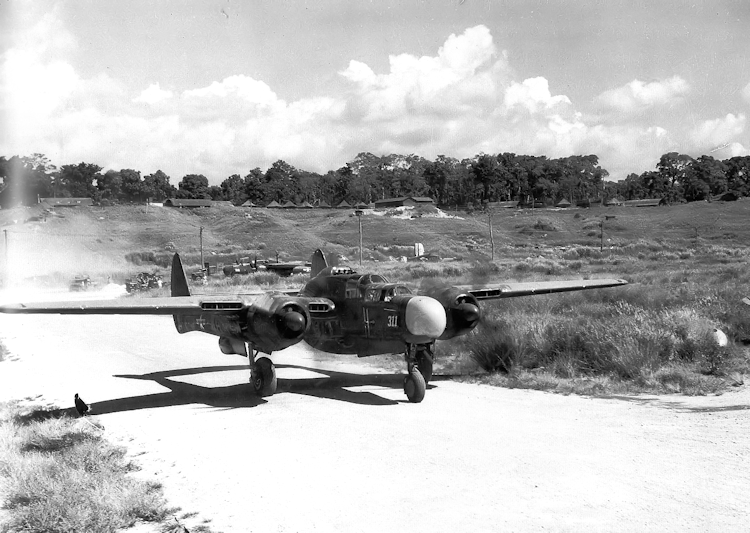
- 419th NFS 42-5506 taxiing at Carney Airfield, Guadalcanal, Solomon Islands, shortly after the P-61's arrival in early 1944
- Active: 1943–1947
- Country: United States
- Branch: United States Army Air Forces
- Type: Squadron
- Role: Night Fighter Operations
- Part of: Thirteenth Air Force
- Engagements: World War II Asia-Pacific Theatre

Insignia
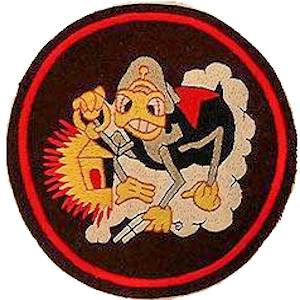
- Emblem of the 419th Night Fighter Squadron

The 419th Night Fighter Squadron is an inactive United States Air Force unit. Its last assignment was with Thirteenth Air Force, being inactivated at Floridablanca, Luzon on 20 February 1947.

The unit was formed in 1943. After training, it was deployed to Thirteenth Air Force and ordered to New Guinea to provide air defense interceptor protection against Japanese night air raids on USAAF airfields. It later served in the Philippines Campaign where in addition to night interceptor missions it also flew day and night interdiction missions against enemy troop movements, bridges and other targets of opportunity. It was inactivated in 1947.

== History ==
Activated on 1 April 1943. Trained at Kissimmee, Florida and trained in Douglas P-70 Havoc night fighters due to non-availability of P-61 Black Widows. By the end of training, the night fighter pilots realized that the Black Widow would not be forthcoming and resigned themselves to the fact they would be going overseas with P-70s.

The squadron was deployed to the South Pacific Theater, arriving at Guadalcanal, Solomon Islands on 15 November 1943, assigned to Thirteenth Air Force. It was the second dedicated night fighter squadron assigned to the Pacific. At Guadalcanal, the squadron absorbed Detachment B of the 6th Night Fighter Squadron. On 21 November 1943, the squadron was assigned to the 18th Fighter Group.

However, it was found that the P-70 was not very successful in actual combat interception of Japanese fighters at night. It was issued P-38H Lightnings stock day fighters with no radar or any other equipment for finding the enemy at night. The Lightning pilots would wait until the enemy was over a target and, hopefully, illuminated by the defender's searchlights. They would then try to pick out the outline of the enemy aircraft and intercept. This method had its dangers since the P-38 was subjecting itself to antiaircraft fire from defenders as well as gunners aboard the Japanese bombers. The squadron received the P-61 Black Widow to replace the P-38s/P-70s in May 1944. Then on 25 August 1944, the squadron was reassigned to the XIII Fighter Command.

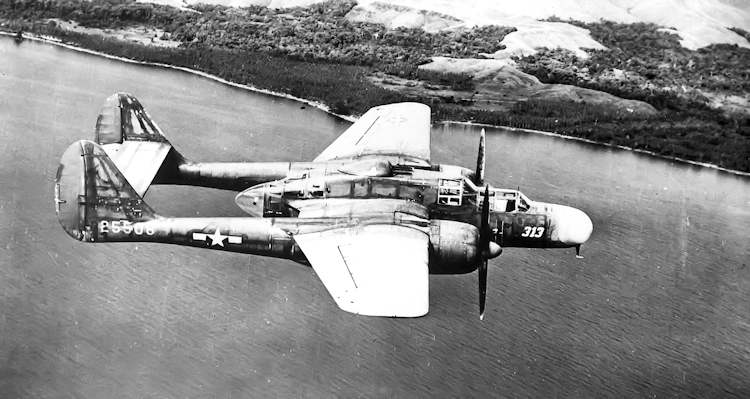
42-5508 flying near Noemfoor, Schouten Islands, late 1944.

The squadron flew numerous missions against Japanese night intruders, which were a real nuisance to American forces and which up to this time had been virtually immune from interception. On typical missions, the pilot would be directed to the vicinity of its target by ground-based radar. The onboard A/I radar under the control of the radar operator would then be used to direct the pilot to close with and intercept the enemy. As soon as the pilot had gotten close enough to its target to make a visual identification, the guns would be aimed and fired by the pilot or by the gunner. The appearance of the Black Widow in the night skies over the Pacific was a rude and unpleasant surprise for these night raiders. Engaged the enemy during the New Guinea, Northern Solomon Islands and Bismarck Archipelago Campaigns.

Moved the Philippines in 1945, operating primarily over the southern islands. During 1945 aerial targets became increasingly rare, the 419th turned to long range night-time intruding, carrying out the same mission as the aircraft they had originally been stalking ending the war being stationed on Palawan. Personnel demobilized at Clark Field and returned to the United States after the war; equipment remained in the Philippines for reclamation or sent to postwar units.

Inactivated on 20 February 1947 at Puerto Princess, Palawan, Philippines as an administrative unit.

=== Lineage ===
- Constituted as: 419th Night Fighter Squadron on 24 March 1943

Activated on 1 April 1943
Inactivated on 20 February 1947

=== Assignments ===
- Air Defense Department, Army Air Force School of Applied Tactics, 1 April 1943

Attached to 481st Night Fighter Operational Training Group, 17 July 1943

- Thirteenth Air Force

XIII Fighter Command, 15 November 1943
18th Fighter Group, 21 November 1943
XIII Fighter Command, 25 August 1944
85th Fighter Wing, 10 January 1946 – 20 February 1947.

=== Stations ===
- Orlando AAB, Florida, 1 April 1943
- Kissimmee AAF, Florida, 22 April – 15 October 1943
- Carney Airfield, Guadalcanal, Solomon Islands, 15 November 1943

Detachment "A" operated from: Buka Airfield, Bougainville, Solomon Islands, 25 January – 27 May 1944
Detachment operated from: Nadzab Airfield, New Guinea, 26 June – 25 July 1944
Detachment operated from: Mokmer Airfield, Biak, Netherlands East Indies, 26 July – 27 November 1944
Detachment operated from: Momote Airfield, Los Negros Island, Admiralty Islands, 27 June – 18 August 1944

- Middleburg (Toem) Airfield, Netherlands East Indies, 21 August 1944

Detachment operated from: Wama Airfield, Morotai, Netherlands East Indies, 27 November 1944 – 16 March 1945

- Puerto Princesa Airfield, Palawan, Philippines, 6 March 1945

Detachment operated from: San Roque Airfield (Moret Field), Mindanao, Philippines 18 March – 20 July 1945
Detachment operated from: Sanga Sanga, Sulu, Philippines, 20 June – 24 July 1945

- Clark Field, Luzon, Philippines, 10 January 1946
- Floridablanca Airfield (Basa Air Base), Floridablanca, Luzon, Philippines, 7 May 1946 – 20 February 1947.

=== Aircraft ===
- A-20 Havoc (1943–1944)
- P-38H Lightning (1943–1947)
- P-61 Black Widow (1944–1947)

== See also ==
- 481st Night Fighter Operational Training Group
