= Owi Airfield =

Former WWI airport in Indonesia

Owi Airfield
- Part of Fifth Air Force
- Located on Owi Island, Schouten Islands, Indonesia.

Site information
- Type: Military airfield
- Controlled by: United States Army Air Forces

Location
- Location in Papua Location in Indonesia
- Coordinates: 01°14′38.75″S 136°12′42.44″E

Site history
- Built: 1944
- In use: 1944-1945

Owi Airfield is a former World War II airfield located on Owi Island in the Schouten Islands, Indonesia.

The airfield was ordered built by General MacArthur on 6 June 1944. It was constructed by the 864th Engineer Aviation Battalion with B Company initiating the construction on 8 June 1944. The rest of the battalion was on the island by 11 June and the field was completed and operational on 22 June, a total construction time of three weeks. Improvements were made until the end of the war. The island and the airfield were used as a major command and control, as well as an operational fighter and bomber base from the summer of 1944 until the end of the war in September 1945. The airfield was abandoned after the war and today is almost totally returned to its natural state.

The construction proved to be a fairly simple concept; scrape off soil and expose the white coral - then level out the coral for a good, sound runway surface. Because the base was natural coral it was somewhat easy to maintain after the initial construction. Initially, Japanese pilots caused regular damage to the runway as they attacked the field and the air assets placed on the island. As the United States gained air superiority in the area the need for maintenance decreased and it became safe enough for support units to be placed on the island.

On the linked satellite image the airfield is still clearly visible over 60 years after being abandoned.

== Units assigned ==
- Headquarters, Fifth Air Force (10 August-20 November 1944)
- Headquarters, V Bomber Command (15 August–November 1944)
- Headquarters, V Fighter Command (July–November 1944)
- Headquarters, 864th Engineer Aviation Battalion (8 June–September 1944)
- 308th Bombardment Wing (2 July-10 August 1944)
- 309th Bombardment Wing (9 November 1944 – 8 February 1945)
- 22d Bombardment Group (11 August-15 November 1944)

Headquarters, 2d, 19th, 33d, 408th Bomb Squadrons, B-24 Liberator

- 43d Bombardment Group (2 July-15 November 1944)

Headquarters, 63d, 64th, 65th, 403d Bomb Squadrons, B-24 Liberator

- 8th Fighter Group (17 June-19 September 1944)

Headquarters, 35th, 36th, 80th Fighter Squadrons, P-38 Lightning

- 35th Fighter Group (22 July-27 September 1944)

Headquarters, 39th, 41st Fighter Squadrons, P-47 Thunderbolt

- Det: 418th Night Fighter Squadron (310th Bombardment Wing) (16 September-5 October 1944). P-61 Black Widow
- 421st Night Fighter Squadron (V Fighter Command) (28 June-25 October 1944)
- 547th Night Fighter Squadron (6 October-31 December 1944), P-38 Lightning, P-61 Black Widow

== See also ==
- USAAF in the Southwest Pacific
