= 308th Bombardment Wing (U.S. Army Air Forces) =

US Air Force unit

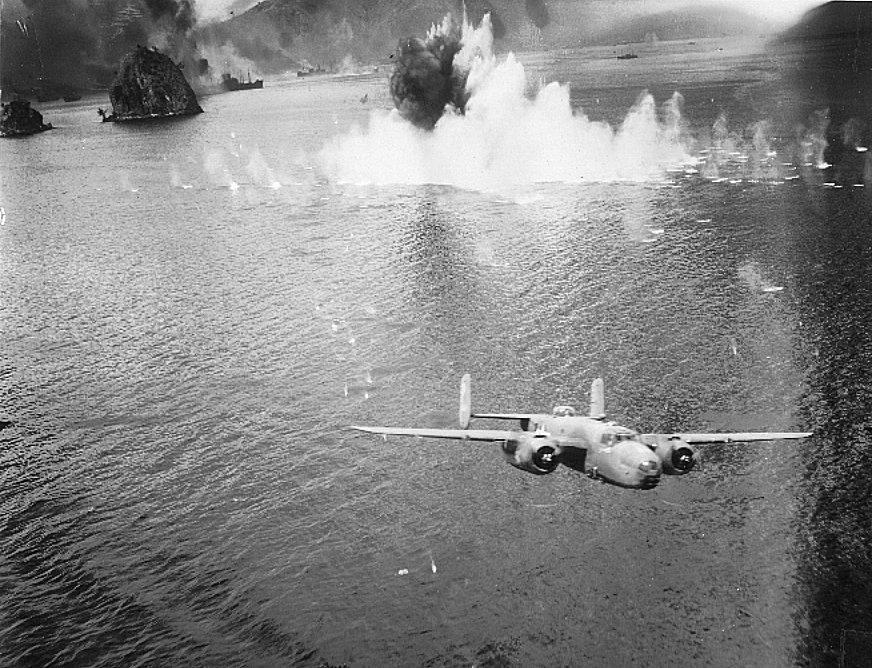
- North American B-25 Mitchell attacking enemy shipping in New Guinea
- Active: 1944–1948
- Country: United States
- Branch: United States Air Force
- Motto(s): We Lead
- Engagements: South West Pacific Theater of World War II
- Decorations: Philippine Republic Presidential Unit Citation

The 308th Bombardment Wing is an inactive United States Air Force unit. Its last assignment was with Far East Air Forces at Nagoya, Japan, where it was inactivated on 30 June 1948.

The wing served in combat with Fifth Air Force from February 1944 to August 1945, operating as a task force with various groups and squadrons that were attached for brief periods. It earned a Philippine Republic Presidential Unit Citation for its actions on Leyte and Luzon. The 308th became part of the occupation force from 1945 to 1947 when it was stripped of all personnel, remaining a paper unit until it was inactivated.

== History ==
=== Background ===
General George C. Kenney, commander of Far East Air Forces (FEAF), developed the concept in late 1942 for an "Air Task Force“ to be located at an advanced base. The Air Task Force was to be a streamlined operational organization free from administrative duties so that it could concentrate on a given operation. Once the operation was complete, components of the force could be returned to their parent organizations. To implement this concept, the Buna Task Force (later renamed the 1st Air Task Force) was formed at Dobodura as a provisional organization, with its personnel drawn from the Fifth Air Force Advanced Echelon (ADVON), already located there. The task force defended installations at Dobodura from enemy air and sea attack, attacked Japanese forces at Rabaul and dropped supplies to advanced forces fighting at Lae and Saidor.

=== New Guinea ===
On 1 Feb 44 the provisional Air Task Force was transformed into the 308th Bombardment Wing. The wing began to establish air bases at Saidor, Cape Gloucester and Finschhafen. The wing's ADVON moved to Finschhafen and almost at once began to support the landings on Momote by the 1st Cavalry Division with fighter cover, air resupply and limited air strikes.

The ADVON moved to Wakde one day after the infantry landed to establish a base to extend the range of Allied airpower in New Guinea. The island seemed secure, so the infantry units were withdrawn from the island on 20 May. However Japanese forces infiltrated the 308th's camp the following morning. The camp was successfully defended by members of the wing's 303d Airdrome Squadron. As the Wakde airstrip was being established, Japanese attacks continued and caused casualties among units attached to the wing.

The wing proceeded to Biak to establish airfields for the forthcoming Morotai offensive. but strong resistance delayed the offensive on the island beyond the date when the airfields were planned to become operational, so nearby Owi Island was reconnoitered and proved to be a better base. The last resistance on Owi ended when wing Consolidated B-24 Liberators attacked on 22 July, destroying the last enemy stronghold. A Japanese attempt to reinforce the island was beaten back by wing North American B-25 Mitchells, which sank three ships, damaged two, and turned the reinforcements back.

Wing fighters covered the Noemfoor landings. Extensive strikes by the wing were able to keep enemy airfields in the region non-operational. During this period wing Mitchell bombers became the first American planes to strike the Philippines since the defeat there in May 1942. During operations from Owi and Biak wing fighters scored 28 victories over enemy aircraft and 55 more were destroyed on ground. In addition, shipping strikes resulted in 30 freighters plus 91 smaller craft sunk while over 200 more were damaged.

=== Philippine Islands ===
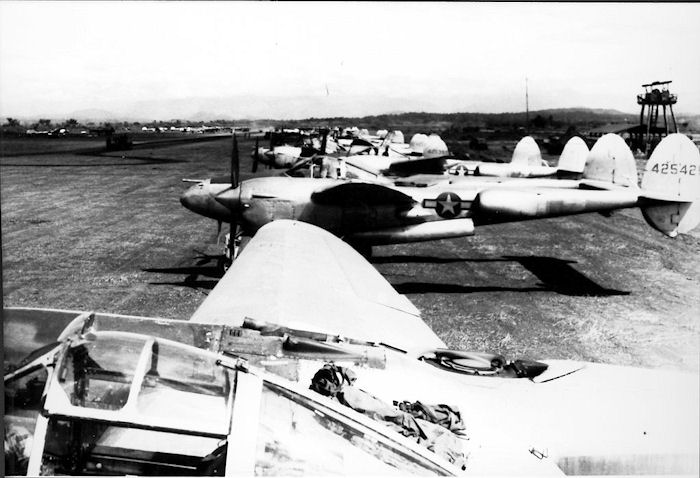
P-38 Lightnings in the Philippines

The wing did not resume operations until September when it began attacks from Hollandia. On 22 Oct 1944 it landed at Tacloban in the Philippines Only two days later as preparation of the airfield had barely begun, Tacloban was used as an emergency strip by Navy planes engaged in the Battle of Leyte Gulf because their carriers were under attack. The incomplete strip handled a landing every 2 minutes, some crashing because of the soft uneven nature of the strip. Japanese strafers arrived during the recovery operation, but two hours later, 59 Navy planes had been prepared to enter combat again On the 27th the field was ready for the Lockheed P-38 Lightnings of the 49th Fighter Group. These fighters initially concentrated on defending the Leyte beachhead, but as fighter strength increased, Japanese air attacks were limited to night raids. During operations on Leyte, in addition to merchant shipping, wing aircraft destroyed one cruiser, eight destroyers, and two destroyer escort. 375 enemy aircraft were destroyed as the 308th achieved air superiority before handing over Leyte at the end of December.

In Jan 45 the wing assumed responsibility for Lingayen with its headquarters at Binmaley. It supported I Corps and guerrilla forces most of which were concentrated on northern Luzon. Wing aircraft flew hundreds of close air support missions near Baguio. Japanese air opposition in the Philippines had been reduced to the extent that wing fighters were diverted from providing air cover to close air support missions. The 308th began attacks on Formosa, concentrating on chemical factories providing materiel for aviation fuel and explosives. It attacked Hong Kong and Canton to isolate Japanese forces there.

The wing arrived in Okinawa in late June where it served as the ADVON for both Fifth Air Force and Far East Air Forces, assuming Operational Control of all land based aircraft on the island including Navy and Marine aircraft until Seventh Air Force headquarters arrived the following month.

=== Occupation Duty ===
The wing moved to Korea late in 1945 and became part of the occupation force. It transferred without personnel and equipment to Japan in 1947 and was not remanned. The unit inactivated on 30 June 1948.

== Lineage ==
- Constituted as the 308th Bombardment Wing, Heavy on 20 January 1944

Activated on 1 February 1944
Redesignated 308th Bombardment Wing, Light in March 1946

- Inactivated on 30 June 1948

=== Assignments ===
- Fifth Air Force, 1 February 1944 – 31 August 1945
- Far East Air Forces, 1 September 1945 – 30 June 1948

=== Stations ===
- Oro Bay (Cape Sudest) Airfield, New Guinea, 1 February 1944
- Owi Airfield, Schouten Islands, Netherlands East Indies, 2 July 1944
- Hollandia, Netherlands East Indies, 10 August 1944
- Tacloban Airfield, Leyte, Philippines, 22 October 1944
- San Marcelino Airfield, Luzon, Philippines, 11 January 1945
- Motobu Airfield, Okinawa, Japan, 16 June 1945
- Seoul, Korea, 22 September 1945
- Kimpo, Korea, 7 January 1946
- Nagoya, Japan, March 1947 – 30 June 1948

=== Components ===
Groups

- 3d Air Commando Group: (attached, 26 January 1945 – 18 May 1945)
- 49th Fighter Group: 5 June 1944 – 11 July 1944; 26 September – 8 December 1944
- 475th Fighter Group: 1 February 1946 – 22 March 1947 (attached 1 February 1944 – 24 March 1944; ca. 23 September 1945 – ca. 31 January 1946)
- Groups attached for brief periods between 1 February 1944 and 1 September 1945

3d Bombardment Group
8th Fighter Group
18th Fighter Group
22d Bombardment Group
35th Fighter Group

38th Bombardment Group
43d Bombardment Group
58th Fighter Group
90th Bombardment Group
312th Bombardment Group

345th Bombardment Group
348th Fighter Group
375th Troop Carrier Group
417th Bombardment Group
494th Bombardment Group

Operational Squadrons

- 4th Reconnaissance Squadron: (attached 22 October 1945 – 14 April 1946)
- 26th Photographic Reconnaissance Squadron: 21 November 1945 – 20 February 1946 (attached 22 October 1945 – 21 November 1945)
- 160th Liaison Squadron: 25 March 1946 – 20 May 1946 (attached ca. 22 September 1945 – 25 March 1946)
- 418th Night Fighter Squadron: (attached 1 February 1944 – ca 15 May 1944, 9 July 1945 – ca. 30 July 1945)
- 547th Night Fighter Squadron: (attached 16 January 1945 – February 1945)

Navy and Marine units attached in Okinawa

- MAG 24
- MAG 32
- VMF-115
- VMF-211
- VMF-218
- VMF-313
- VMF(N)-541
- VB-117

=== Awards and campaigns ===
Award streamer	Award	Dates	Notes
	Philippine Republic Presidential Unit Citation	22 October 1944-16 June 1945	

Campaign Streamer	Campaign	Dates	Notes
	Air Offensive, Japan	1 February 1944 – 2 September 1945	
	China Defensive	1 February 1944 – 4 May 1945	
	New Guinea	1 February 1944 – 31 December 1944	
	Bismarck Archipelago	1 February 1944 – 27 November 1944	
	Western Pacific	17 April 1944 – 2 September 1945	
	Leyte	17 October 1944 – 1 July 1945	
	Luzon	15 December 1944 – 4 July 1945	
	Ryukus	26 March 1945 – 2 July 1945	
	China Offensive	5 May 1945 – 2 September 1945	
