= 310th Air Division =

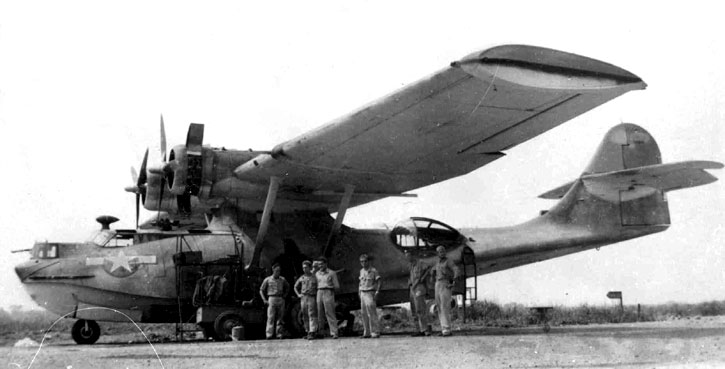
- OA-10 Catalina as flown by the 3d Emergency Rescue Squadron
- Active: 1944–1946; 1947–1949
- Country: United States
- Branch: United States Air Force
- Role: Command of reserve forces
- Engagements: South West Pacific Theater of World War II
- Decorations: Philippine Presidential Unit Citation

The 310th Air Division is an inactive United States Air Force organization. Its last assignment was with Continental Air Command's Twelfth Air Force at Tinker Air Force Base, Oklahoma, where it was inactivated on 27 June 1949.

The division was first activated as the 310th Bombardment Wing in New Guinea during World War II. It served as a task force headquarters, commanding advanced elements of Fifth Air Force during the New Guinea campaign and the liberation of the Philippines. After VJ Day, it moved to Japan, serving in the occupation forces until inactivating in March 1946. The wing was again activated in the reserves in 1947, becoming a division the following year.

== History ==
=== World War II ===
During World War II, the 310 Bombardment Wing, Medium was a command echelon of Fifth Air Force in the Southwest Pacific theater, controlling numerous fighter and bomber groups and squadrons until the Japanese surrender in 1945. Its attached units "flew missions against Japanese shipping, coastal installations, gun positions, airdromes, and troop concentrations. Fighting in New Guinea and later in the Philippine Islands, attached fighter units flew escort for bombing, supply, and reconnaissance missions." In October 1945, the wing moved to Japan and served in the occupation force. It was inactivated in Japan during early 1946.

=== Air Force Reserve ===
The 310th Bombardment Wing was activated as a reserve unit under Air Defense Command (ADC) at Tinker Field, Oklahoma on 26 July 1947, but had no units assigned until September when the 323d Bombardment Group was activated at Tinker and assigned to the wing. The 177th AAF Base Unit (later the 2592d Air Force Reserve Training Center) supervised the training of reserve units at Tinker. Later that fall, at the end of October, the 340th Bombardment Group was activated at Tulsa Municipal Airport and assigned to the wing. Although the units were designated as bombardment units, it appeared they were equipped with North American AT-6 Texan and Beechcraft AT-11 aircraft only.

In 1948, when the regular Air Force implemented the wing base organization system, the wing, along with other multi-base reserve wings was redesignated as an air division. The same year, Continental Air Command assumed responsibility for managing reserve and Air National Guard units from ADC.

The 310th was inactivated when Continental Air Command reorganized its reserve units under the wing base organization system in June 1949. The division's personnel and equipment were transferred to the 323d Bombardment Wing, which was activated at Tinker the same day and assumed command of the 323d Bombardment Group. President Truman’s reduced 1949 defense budget also required reductions in the number of units in the Air Force, and the 340th Group was inactivated in August and not replaced as reserve flying operations at Tulsa ceased.

== Lineage ==
- Established as the 310th Bombardment Wing, Medium on 20 January 1944

Activated on 1 February 1944
Inactivated on 25 March 1946

- Redesignated 310th Bombardment Wing, Light on 27 May 1947

Activated in the Reserve on 26 July 1947
Redesignated 310th Air Division, Bombardment on 16 April 1948
Inactivated on 27 June 1949

=== Assignments ===
- Fifth Air Force, 1 February 1944 – 25 March 1946
- Tenth Air Force, 26 July 1947
- Fourteenth Air Force, 1 July 1948
- Twelfth Air Force, 12 January – 27 June 1949

=== Stations ===
- Gusap Airfield, New Guinea, 1 February 1944
- Hollandia, New Guinea, 6 May 1944
- Wama Drome, Morotai, Netherlands East Indies, 18 September 1944
- Bayug Airfield, Leyte, Philippines, 14 November 1944
- McGuire Field, Mindoro, Philippines, 15 December 1944
- Clark Field, Luzon, Philippines, 23 August 1945
- Itami Airfield, Japan, 21 October 1945 – 25 March 1946
- Tinker Field (later Tinker Air Force Base), Oklahoma, 26 July 1947 – 27 June 1949

=== Components ===
==== World War II ====
Groups

- 3d Bombardment Group: attached 1 May 1944 – September 1944; 15 January 1945 – 31 May 1946
- 8th Fighter Group: attached c. 31 May 1944 – c. 25 March 1946
- 18th Fighter Group: attached 24 March – 26 April 1945
- 35th Fighter Group: attached 1 February – 1 August 1944, 2 October 1944 – 25 March 1946
- 38th Bombardment Group: 19 October 1944 – c. 25 March 1946
- 42d Bombardment Group: attached 3–14 September 1944, assigned 31 January – 25 March 1946
- 49th Fighter Group: attached 1 February – 1 May 1944, 9 January – 29 May 1945, 25 September – 10 November 1945
- 58th Fighter Group: attached 9 January – 7 April 1945
- 71st Tactical Reconnaissance Group: attached 9 January – 10 November 1945
- 90th Bombardment Group: attached 31 May – 3 September 1944; 15 January – 23 November 1945
- 312th Bombardment Group: 31 May – 3 September 1944; 1 July – 13 October 1945
- 348th Fighter Group: 1 May – 25 August 1944; 25 September 1945 – 25 March 1946
- 375th Troop Carrier Group: 24 March – 9 August 1945
- 380th Bombardment Group: c. 24 March 1945 – unknown
- 417th Bombardment Group: 9 January – 1 November 1945
- 475th Fighter Group: 14 May – 16 June 1944

Squadrons

- 3d Emergency Rescue Squadron: 9 January 1945 – unknown
- 17th Photographic Reconnaissance Squadron: 29 May – 3 September 1944; c. 24 March – 3 April 1945
- 25th Liaison Squadron: c. 15 January 1945 – unknown
- 25th Photographic Reconnaissance Squadron: c. 9 January 1945 – unknown
- 26th Photographic Reconnaissance Squadron: c. 1 July – 3 September 1944
- 41st Troop Carrier Squadron: c. 17 May – 3 September 1944
- 65th Troop Carrier Squadron: c. 15 January 1945 – unknown
- 66th Troop Carrier Squadron: c. 15 January 1945 – unknown
- 82d Tactical Reconnaissance Squadron: 9 January 1945 – unknown
- 110th Reconnaissance Squadron (later 110th Tactical Reconnaissance Squadron): c. 1 February – 10 April 1944; c. 9 January 1945 – unknown
- 318th Troop Carrier Squadron: c. 15 January 1945 – unknown
- 418th Night Fighter Squadron: 15 May – 9 November 1944; 26 December 1944 – 30 January 1945; 22 October – 10 November 1945
- 421st Night Fighter Squadron: c. 31 May – 3 September 1944
- 547th Night Fighter Squadron: 9 January 1945 – unknown; 22 October – 10 November 1945

==== Air Force Reserve ====
- 323d Bombardment Group: 9 September 1947 – 27 June 1949
- 340th Bombardment Group; 31 October 1947 – 19 August 1949

=== Aircraft ===
- Douglas A-20 Havoc, 1944-c. 1945
- Douglas A-26 Invader, 1944-c. 1945
- Consolidated B-24 Liberator, 1944-c. 1945
- North American B-25 Mitchell, 1944-c. 1945
- Beechcraft C-43 Traveler, 1944-c. 1945
- Beechcraft C-45 Expeditor, 1944-c. 1945
- Lockheed F-5 Lightning, 1944-c. 1945
- Stinson L-5 Sentinel, 1944-c. 1946
- Lockheed P-38 Lightning, 1944-c. 1945
- Bell P-39 Airacobra, 1944-c. 1945
- Curtiss P-40 Warhawk, 1944-c. 1945
- Republic P-47 Thunderbolt, 1944-c. 1945
- Northrop P-61 Black Widow, 1944-c. 1945
- Douglas P-70 Havoc, 1944-c. 1945
- Curtiss C-46 Commando, c. 1945-c. 1946
- Douglas C-47 Skytrain, c. 1945-c. 1946
- Consolidated OA-10 Catalina, c. 1945-c. 1946
- North American P-51 Mustang, c. 1945-c. 1946.

=== Commanders ===
- Brig Gen Donald R. Hutchison, 1 February 1944
- Col John T. Murtha, 16 Oct 19448
- Col Jack A. Wilson, 15 December 1944
- Col William M. Morgan, 22 March 1945
- Col Jack A. Wilson, 17 July 1945
- Col William M. Morgan, 29 August 1945
- Col Othel R. Deering 16 December 1945 – unknown

== See also ==
- List of United States Air Force air divisions
