= 418th Test and Evaluation Squadron =

United States Air Force unit

418th Test and Evaluation Squadron

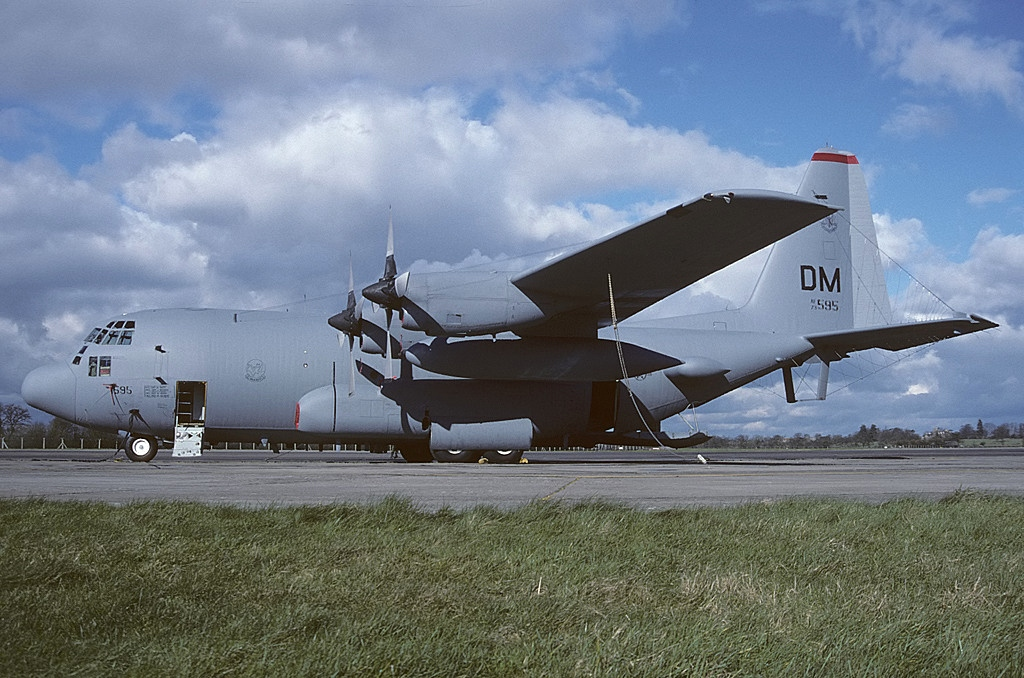
- Lockheed EC-130H Compass Call
- Active: 1943-1947; 1957-1958; 1969-1976; 2021-present
- Country: United States
- Branch: United States Army; United States Air Force
- Type: squadron
- Role: Test and evaluation
- Part of: Air Combat Command
- Garrison/HQ: Davis-Monthan AFB
- Engagements: Southwest Pacific Theater
- Decorations: Air Force Outstanding Unit Award; Philippine Presidential Unit Citation

Insignia
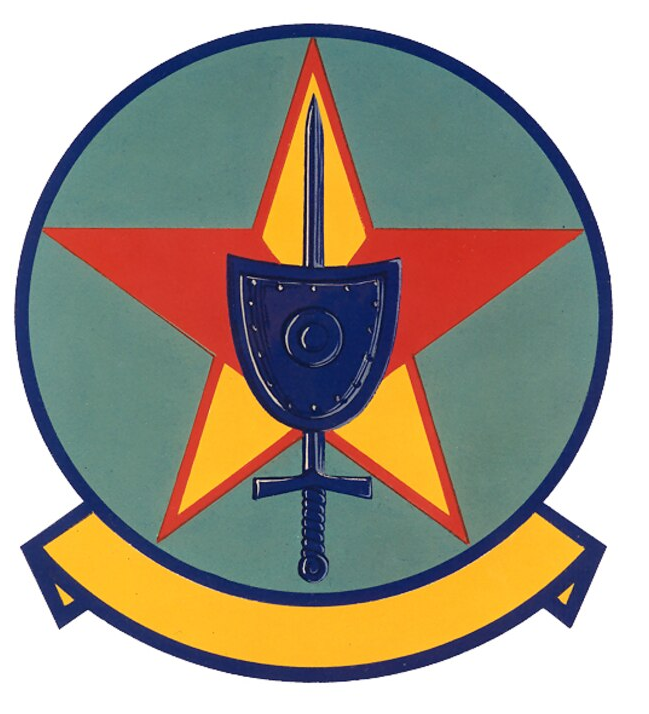
- 418th Test and Evaluation Squadron emblem (Note: Approved 1 June 1971)

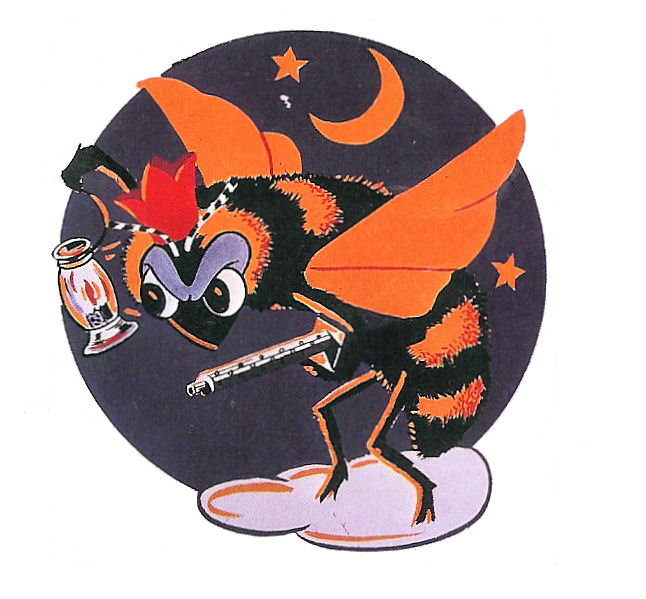
- 418th Night Fighter Squadron emblem (Note: Approved 11 October 1943.)

The 418th Test and Evaluation Squadron is an active United States Air Force unit assigned to the 53rd Test and Evaluation Group, and stationed at Davis-Monthan Air Force Base, Arizona, where it was activated on 1 October 2021.

The unit was originally formed as the 418th Night Fighter Squadron in 1943. After training, it was deployed to Fifth Air Force and ordered to New Guinea to provide air defense interceptor protection against Japanese night air raids on US airfields. It later served in the Philippines Campaign where in addition to night interceptor missions it also flew day and night interdiction missions against enemy troop movements, bridges and other targets of opportunity. It later served in Occupied Japan and Okinawa where it was inactivated in 1947.

During the Cold War, the squadron was briefly activated in the Philippines in 1958 as the 418th Fighter-Day Squadron, but was not manned before it was replaced by another unit. In 1969, it was redesignated the 418th Tactical Fighter Training Squadron and replaced another unit at Luke Air Force Base, Arizona, training German Air Force pilots in the Lockheed F-104G Starfighter at Luke, continuing this mission until inactivated on 1 October 1976 as the Starfighter was replaced in German service.

== Mission ==
Develop and implement new tactics, techniques and procedures to more effectively use Lockheed HC-130J Combat King II and Lockheed EC-130H Compass Call aircraft for combatant commands.

== History ==
=== World War II ===
The squadron was activated on 1 April 1943 at the Army Air Force School of Applied Tactics, Orlando Army Air Base, Florida. After several months of training with Douglas P-70 Havoc night fighters, the unit was deployed to the Pacific Theater, moving first to Camp Patrick Henry, near Newport News, Virginia where they boarded the USS General John Pope, sailing through the Panama Canal to Milne Bay, New Guinea.

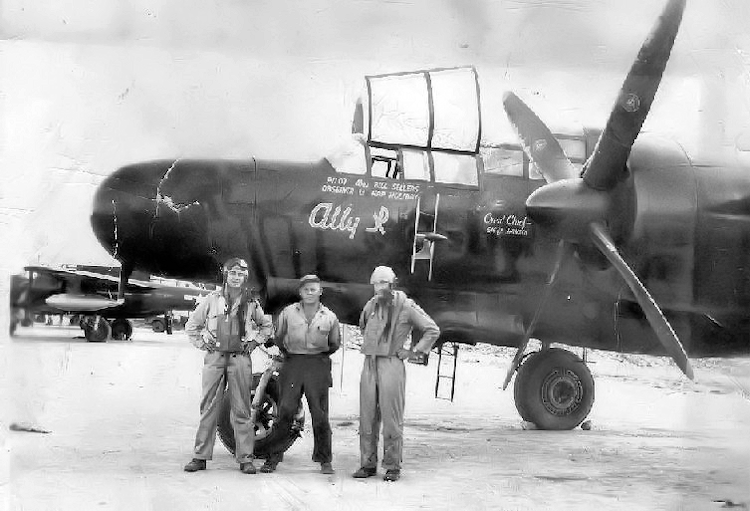
418th Night Fighter Squadron P-61 at McGuire Field (Note: Aircraft is Northrop P-61B-15-NO Black Widow, serial 42-39588. This aircraft assigned to the second commanding officer of the 418th, Major William B. (Bill) Sellers (on left wearing goggles). It was named after his wife Alice Ruth.)

In New Guinea, the squadron was assigned to Fifth Air Force and initially stationed at Dobodura Airfield in November 1943. It was the first dedicated night interceptor squadron assigned to the Pacific Theater. However, it was found that the P-70 was not very successful in actual combat interception of Japanese fighters at night and after a short time, Fifth Air Force modified some Lockheed P-38F Lightnings in the field as single-seat night fighters by fitting an SCR-540 radar with Yagi antennae on the nose on both sides of the planes' central nacelle, and above and below the wings. The Lightnings were much more successful than the P-70s, and Lockheed Aircraft Company sent field representatives to New Guinea to study the modified aircraft for a new production model, the P-38M, which it began producing in 1944.

As the war progressed, the squadron moved west along the northern coast of New Guinea, moving to several advance airfields on the island through 1943 and 1944. In September 1944, the squadron was re-equipped with Northrop P-61 Black Widows and moved to Morotai Island in the Netherlands East Indies where they engaged enemy aircraft. In the East Indies, additional North American B-25 Mitchells and P-38s were assigned, using the B-25s for night intruder operations, P-61s for night fighter operations and the P-38s for searchlight cooperation operations. In November the squadron moved to the Philippines, arriving on Leyte on 14 November.

The unit was attached to different units throughout the war, and remained in the Philippines until July 1945 when it moved to Okinawa. From Kadena Airfield, the unit attacked a wide range of enemy targets on Hainan Island, Hong Kong, and along the east China coast. Its first mission against targets on the Japanese Home Islands took place on 28 July when it attacked targets on Kyūshū and also in the Shanghai area of enemy-controlled China.

After V-J Day, the 418th moved briefly to Atsugi Airfield, Japan during October 1945 where it was part of the occupying forces. It returned to Okinawa on 15 June 1946, conducting training operations until 20 February 1947 when the unit was inactivated. Its personnel, aircraft and equipment were transferred to the 4th Fighter Squadron (All Weather).

=== Cold War in the Pacific ===
The squadron was activated at Misawa Air Base, Japan in late 1957 and assigned to the 39th Air Division, which was responsible for the air defense of northern Japan. It was programmed to be a North American F-100A Super Sabre air superiority squadron. However, before the squadron was manned or equipped, it was decided to base a fighter-bomber unit at Misawa. In March 1958, the squadron was replaced by the 416th Fighter-Bomber Squadron at Misawa and moved on paper to Clark Air Base, Philippines. The squadron remained without its complement of personnel, although deliveries of F-100s began before it was inactivated on 1 July 1958, and the 72d Tactical Fighter Squadron was activated in its place.

=== Luftwaffe training ===
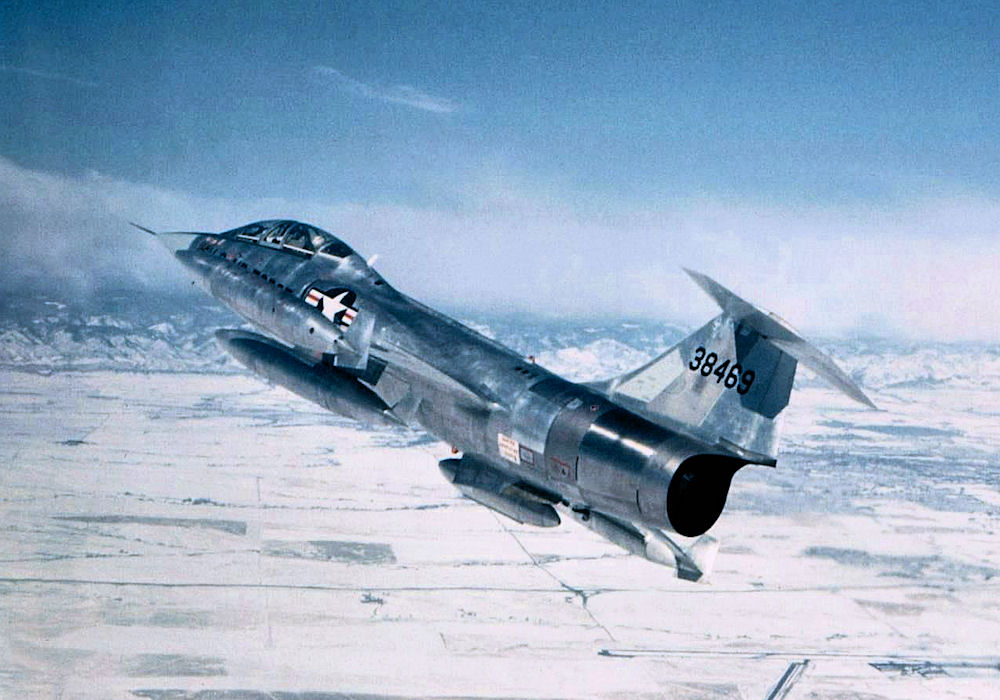
418th Tactical Fighter Training Squadron TF-104G Starfighter (Note: Aircraft is Lockheed TF-104G-LO Starfighter, USAF serial 63-8469, German Air Force identification 27 + 71. Taken in 1972. After the squadron was inactivated, this airplane was sold to the Royal Norwegian Air Force.)

Because of the more favorable weather in the southwestern United States, the German Air Force began training fighter pilots at Luke Air Force Base, Arizona., beginning with training with the Republic F-84F Thunderstreak in 1957. On 1 March 1964, Tactical Air Command (TAC) organized the 4518th Combat Crew Training Squadron at Luke to train German pilots on the Lockheed TF-104G Starfighter and assigned it to the 4510th Combat Crew Training Wing. On 1 April 1964, the squadron became part of the new 4540th Combat Crew Training Group, but the 4540th Group was inactivated on 1 December 1966 and the squadron returned to wing assignment. The training was in support of foreign military sales, and the squadron operated twin-seat trainers with USAF markings and serial numbers, although the planes were produced in Germany by Messerschmitt-Bölkow-Blohm (MBB) under license from Lockheed and were owned by the German government.

However, the 4518th was a Major Command controlled unit and did not have a permanent history. TAC determined to replace its temporary training units with permanent ones. In this reorganization, on 15 October 1969 the 418th Squadron was again activated under the 58th Tactical Fighter Training Wing and assumed the personnel and equipment of the 4518th. F-104G production ended with the delivery of the last aircraft by MBB in 1973 to the squadron, the last German Air Force students graduated in the summer of 1976. The squadron became nonoperational on 17 August 1976 and was inactivated on 1 October.

=== Test and evaluation ===
The squadron was redesignated the 418th Test and Evaluation Squadron and activated at Davis-Monthan Air Force Base, Arizona on 1 October 2021. It is assigned to the 53rd Test and Evaluation Group at Nellis Air Force Base, Nevada.

== Lineage ==
- Constituted as the 418th Night Fighter Squadron on 17 March 1943

Activated on 1 April 1943
Inactivated on 20 February 1947

- Redesignated 418th Fighter-Day Squadron on 6 December 1957

Activated on 10 December 1957
Inactivated on 1 July 1958

- Redesignated 418th Tactical Fighter Training Squadron on 22 August 1969

Activated on 15 October 1969
Inactivated on 1 October 1976

- Redesignated 418th Test and Evaluation Squadron on 27 September 2021

Activated on 1 October 2021

=== Assignments ===
- Air Defense Department, Army Air Force School of Applied Tactics, 1 April 1943 (attached to 481st Night Fighter Operational Training Group, 17 July – 26 September 1943)
- V Fighter Command, c. 15 November 1943 (attached to First Air Task Force, 22 November 1943; 308th Bombardment Wing, 1 February 1944; 310th Bombardment Wing, c. 15 May 1944; Thirteenth Air Force, 10 November 1944; 310th Bombardment Wing, 26 December 1944 – 30 January 1945; 308th Bombardment Wing, c. 30 July 1945; 310th Bombardment Wing, 22 October 1945; V Bomber Command, 10 November 1945)
- 301st Fighter Wing, 20 March 1946 – 20 February 1947
- 39th Air Division, 10 December 1957
- Thirteenth Air Force, 25 March – 1 July 1958
- 58th Tactical Fighter Training Wing, 15 October 1969 – 1 October 1976
- 53rd Test and Evaluation Group, 1 October 2021 – present

=== Stations ===
- Orlando Army Air Base, Florida, 1 April 1943
- Kissimmee Army Air Field, Florida 1 May 1943
- Gurney Airfield, Milne Bay, New Guinea, 2 November 1943
- Dobodura Airfield, New Guinea, 22 November 1943 – 28 March 1944
- Finschhafen Airfield, New Guinea, 28 March – 12 May 1944
- Hollandia Airfield Complex, New Guinea, Netherlands East Indies, 12 May 1944 (detachment at Wakde Island, 8 June – 18 August 1944)
- Owi Airfield, Schouten Islands, Netherlands East Indies, 16 September 1944 Wama Drome, Morotai, Dutch East Indies, 5 October – 26 December 1944 (ground echelon at Dulag Airfield, Leyte, Philippines, 14 – 30 November 1944, McGuire Field, Mindoro, Philippines, 15–26 December 1944)
- McGuire Field, Mindoro, Philippines, 26 December 1944
- Kadena Airfield, Okinawa, 9 July 1945 – 15 October 1945
- Atsugi Airfield, Japan, 15 October 1945 – 15 June 1946
- Yontan Airfield, Okinawa, 15 June 1946 – 20 February 1947
- Misawa Air Base, 10 December 1957
- Clark Air Base, Luzon, Philippines, 25 March – 1 July 1958
- Luke Air Force Base, Arizona, 15 October 1969 – 1 October 1976
- Davis-Monthan Air Force Base, Arizona, 1 October 2021 – present

=== Aircraft ===
- Douglas P-70 Havoc, 1943-1944
- Lockheed P-38 Lightning, 1943–1944, 1946
- Northrop P-61 Black Widow, 1944–1947
- North American B-25H Mitchell, 1944, 1945-1946
- North American F-100 Super Sabre, 1958
- Lockheed F-104 Starfighter, 1969-1976
- Lockheed HC-130J Combat King II, 2021–present
- Lockheed EC-130H Compass Call, 2021–present
