= Middleburg Airfield =

Military airfield in Indonesia

- Part of Fifth Air Force
- Located on Middleburg Island, in Southwest Papua Province, Indonesia
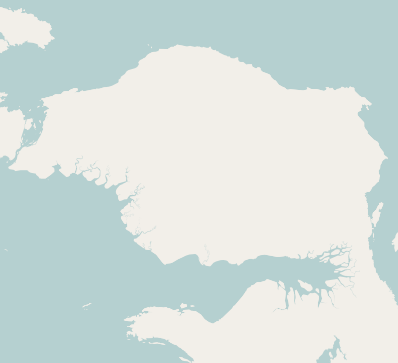
- Location in Southwest Papua Location in Bird's Head Peninsula

Site information
- Type: Military airfield
- Controlled by: United States Army Air Forces

Location
- Coordinates: 00°22′13.53″S 132°11′42.57″E

Site history
- Built: 1944
- In use: 1944-1945

Middleburg Airfield (also known as Klenso Airfield or Toem Airfield) is a World War II airfield located on Middleburg Island, to the north of Sansapor in Southwest Papua, Indonesia. The airfield was abandoned after the war and today is almost totally returned to its natural state.

== History ==
The airfield was built by the Americans, and began as a 5,400 foot-long fighter airstrip, becoming operational on 17 August 1944. A second runway, completed on 3 September, began at 6,000 feet but was soon lengthened to 7,500. It was used by a number of units, including the 419th Night Fighter Squadron flying P-61 Black Widows (21 August to 6 March 1945) and the 67th Fighter Squadron of the 347th Fighter Group flying P-38 Lightnings (15 August to 12 February 1945).

The capture of this island had a significant impact on the Allied war effort in the Southwest Pacific, as the long-range P-38 Lightnings were now in range of several important Japanese installations blocking the route to the Philippines. B-25 Mitchells based on Biak also used Middleburg as a staging base to extend the range of their bombing operations into northern Celebes.

== See also ==
- USAAF in the Southwest Pacific
