= 49th Fighter Group =

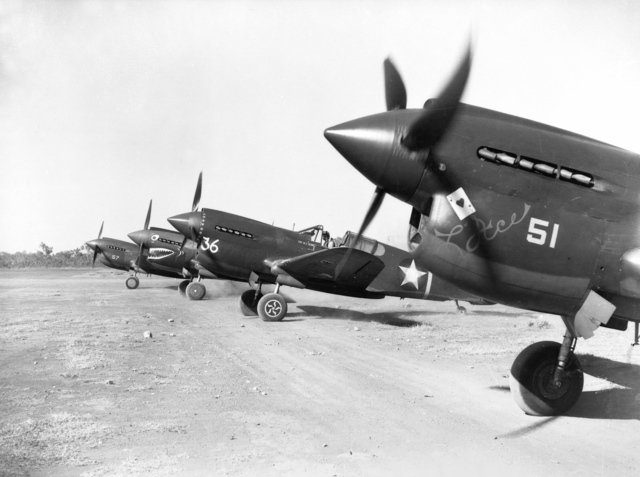
- P-40E Warhawk aircraft of the 49th Fighter Group at Darwin, 1942
- Active: 1942–1945
- Branch: United States Army Air Forces
- Nickname: Fighting 49ers
- Engagements: Australia; New Guinea; Philippines (1944–1945)

Insignia
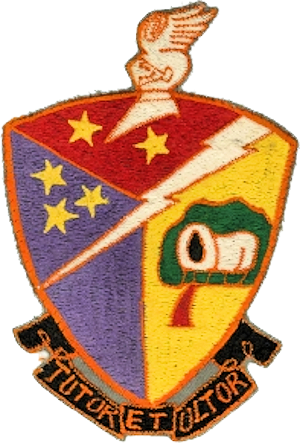
- 49th Fighter Group Emblem

Aircraft flown
- Fighter: P-40 Warhawk; P-38 Lightning

The 49th Fighter Group was a fighter aircraft unit of the Fifth Air Force that was located in the Asiatic-Pacific Theater during World War II.

== Activation and training ==
The group was constituted as 49th Pursuit Group (Interceptor) on 20 November 1940 and activated on 15 January 1941. Stationed at Selfridge Field in Michigan, the group moved to Morrison Field in Florida in May 1941 and trained with Curtiss P-36 Hawk aircraft.

== Move to Australia ==
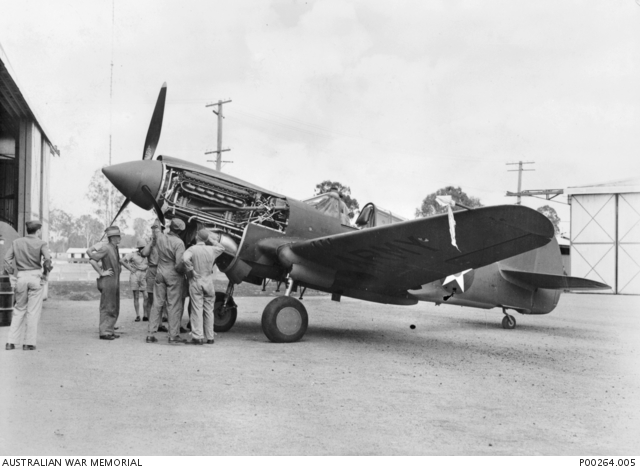
Mechanics assembling a P-40 in Archerfield, Queensland

The group was sent overseas to Australia in January 1942 and was assigned to the Fifth Air Force. They moved to Darwin in April 1942 and was redesignated 49th Fighter Group in May.

The group was equipped with P-40's Curtiss P-40 Warhawk aircraft in Australia and after a brief period of training, provided air defense for the Northern Territory. The 9th Fighter Squadron was stationed at Livingstone, 8th Fighter Squadron was stationed at Strauss Airfield and the 7th Fighter Squadron was stationed at Batchelor.

The 49th Fighter Group was awarded a Distinguished Unit Citation for engaging the enemy in frequent and intense aerial combat while operating with limited material and facilities between March and August 1942.

== New Guinea ==
The group moved to New Guinea in October 1942 to help stall the Japanese drive southward from Buna to Port Moresby. They engaged primarily in air defense of Port Moresby and also escorted bombers and transports, and attacked enemy installations, supply lines, and troop concentrations in support of Allied ground forces.

They participated in the Allied offensive that pushed the Japanese back along the Buna trail and took part in the Battle of the Bismarck Sea in March 1943. They fought for control of the approaches to Huon Gulf, and supported ground forces during the campaign in which the Allies eventually recovered New Guinea. They covered landings on Noemfoor and had a part in the conquest of Biak.

== Conversion to P-38 Lightning ==
In September 1944, the group was re-equipped completely with Lockheed P-38 Lightning aircraft. The twin-engined, multi-role P-38s were able to fly long-range escort and attack missions to Mindanao, Halmahera, Ceram, and Borneo,

== The Philippines ==
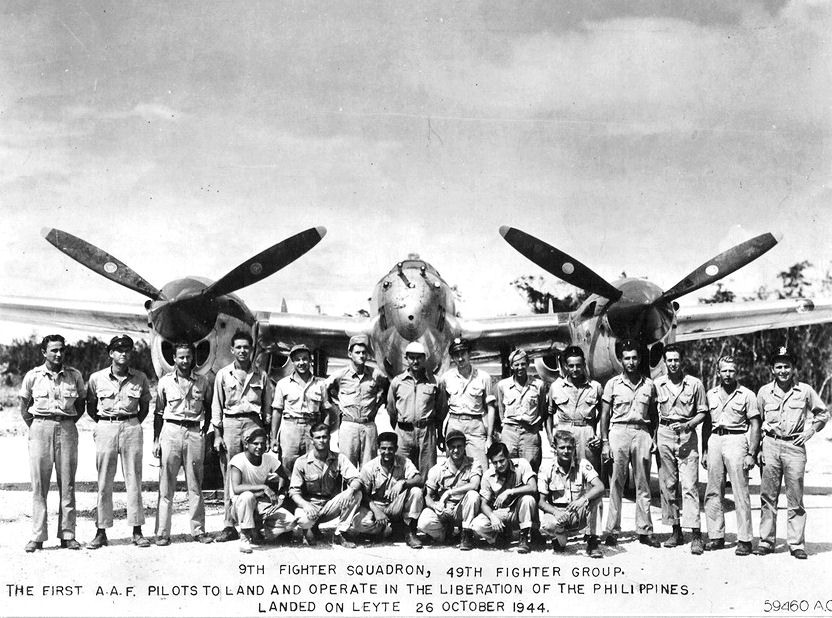
9th Fighter Squadron in front of a P-38 Lightning during the Battle of Leyte in October 1944.

The 49th Fighter Group arrived in the Philippines in October 1944, shortly after the assault landings during the Battle of Leyte. The group was awarded a Distinguished Unit Citation for operations against the Japanese on Leyte.

They engaged enemy fighters, attacked shipping in Ormoc Bay, supported ground forces, and covered the Allied invasion of Luzon during the Battle of Luzon. Other missions from the Philippines included strikes against industry and transportation on Formosa and against shipping along the China coast.

The group moved to Okinawa in August 1945 and to Atsugi, Japan in September.

The group was awarded three Distinguished Unit Citations: Australia, 14 March-25 August 1942; Papua, October 1942-23 – January 1943; and Philippine Islands, 27 October – 7 December 1944.

== Notable pilots ==
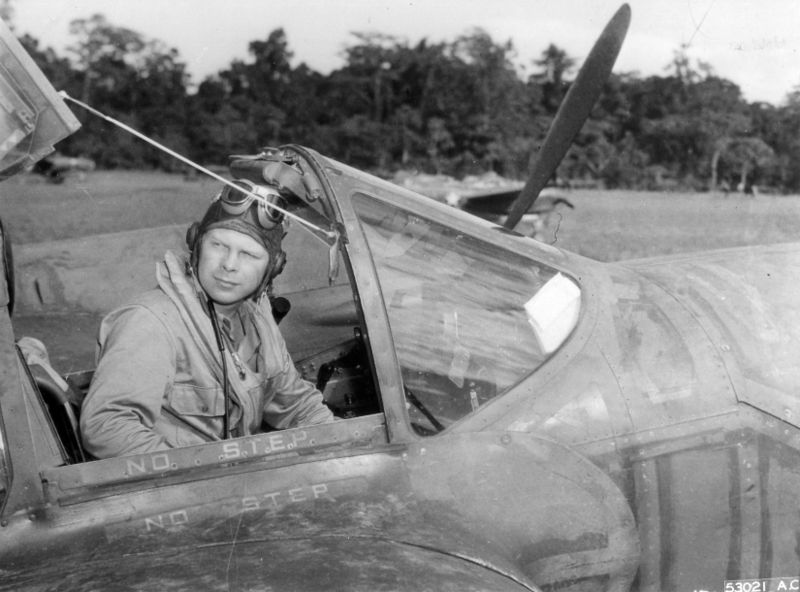
Richard Bong in his P-38 Lightning

Richard Bong was the top ace of World War II, was awarded the Medal of Honor for combat in October and November 1944. He was credited with shooting down 40 Japanese aircraft, all with the P-38 Lightning. He died in California in August 1945 while testing a P-80 Shooting Star jet aircraft.

Paul Wurtsmith commanded the 49th Fighter Group from December 1941 to November 1942. During his command the group shot down 78 enemy aircraft in the defending Darwin against Japanese air attacks. In 1943 he assumed command of the V Fighter Command and in 1945 commanded the Thirteenth Air Force in the Southern Philippines and Borneo campaigns. Wurtsmith was killed in September 1946 when his B-25 Mitchell crashed near Asheville, North Carolina.

Robert H. White was assigned to the 8th Fighter Squadron and was credited with nine victories over Japanese aircraft. He flew a P-40 Warhawk nicknamed the "Kansas City Kitty" and was awarded the Silver Star, and the Distinguished Flying Cross four separate times in recognition of his bravery and skill.

Gerald R. Johnson was a quadruple ace with 22 kills and was awarded with the Distinguished Service Cross, Silver Star, Legion of Merit, Distinguished Flying Cross, and Air Medal. Johnson was with the 54th Fighter Group of the Eleventh Air Force in Alaska before transferring to Australia. He became commander of the 9th Fighter Squadron in August 1943. He was killed in October 1945 two months after the end of the war when the B-25 Mitchell he was piloting crashed in a typhoon.

James B. Morehead was an ace with eight aerial victories. He received a Distinguished Service Cross for shooting down three Japanese aircraft on a single mission in February 1942. He received a second Distinguished Service Cross flying with the 1st Fighter Group in Italy from April to October 1944.

James P. Hagerstrom was assigned to the 8th Fighter Squadron of the 49th Fighter Group after his flight training in 1942 and shipped with the group to Australia. He finished his tour of 170 combat missions in February 1945 credited with six enemy aircraft destroyed. Hagerstrom scored an additional 8.5 victories during the Korean War and flew combat missions in the Vietnam War.

George Preddy is best known as the top P-51 Mustang ace of World War II as a pilot in the European Theater but he flew his first combat missions over Darwin with the 9th Fighter Squadron of the 49th Fighter Group. Preddy was hospitalized after a mid air collision with another P-40, and was reassigned to the 352nd Fighter Group at RAF Bodney in England.

Comedian Dan Rowan (born Daniel Hale David) was a pilot in the 8th Fighter Squadron. He downed 2 Japanese aircraft in his P-40 before being shot down himself in New Guinea and seriously injured.

== See also ==
- Humpty Doo
- No. 5 Fighter Sector RAAF
