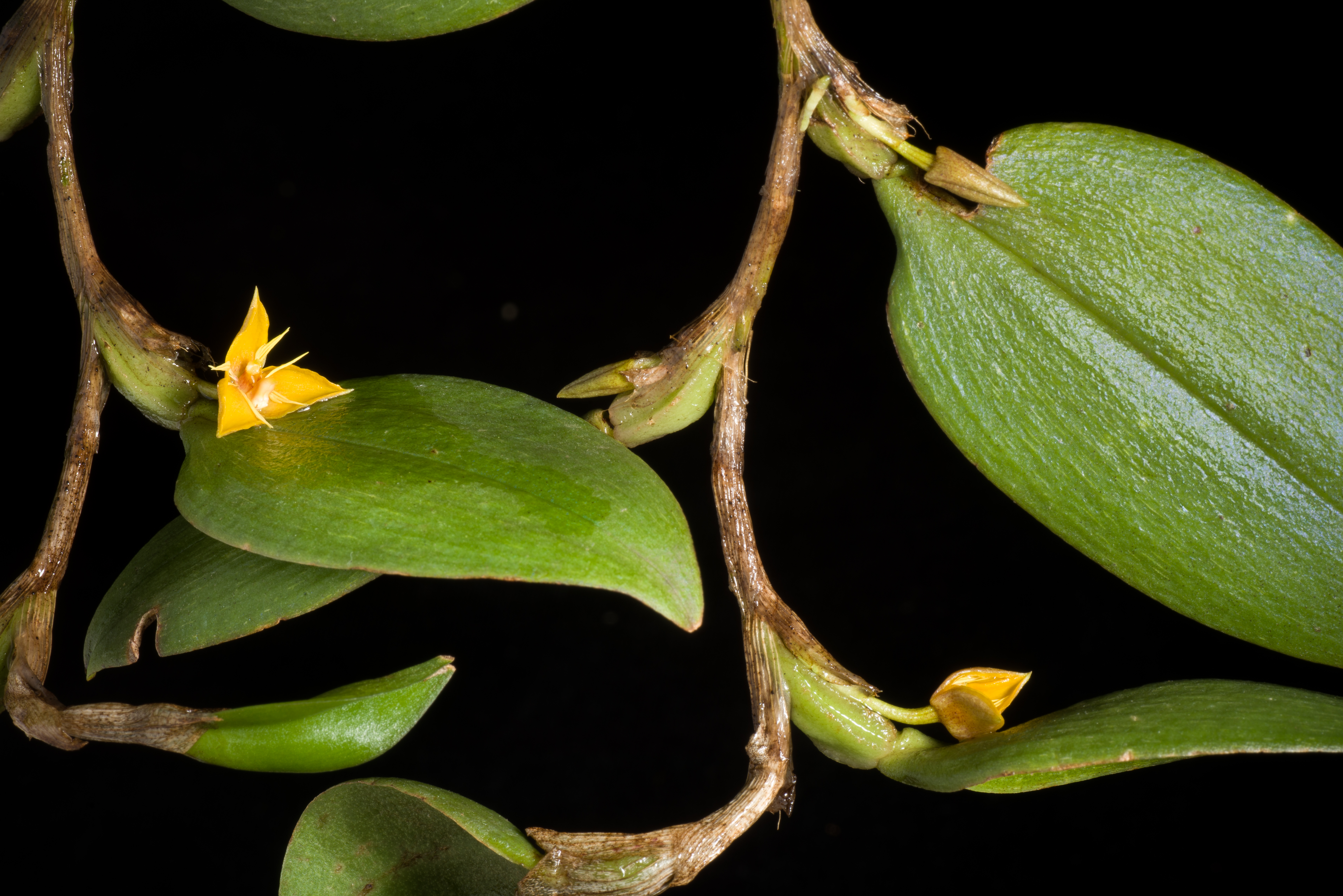
- Bulbophyllum flavofimbriatum

Scientific classification
- Kingdom: Plantae
- Clade: Tracheophytes
- Clade: Angiosperms
- Clade: Monocots
- Order: Asparagales
- Family: Orchidaceae
- Subfamily: Epidendroideae
- Genus: Bulbophyllum
- Section: Bulbophyllum sect. Epicranthes (Blume) Hook. f. 1890

Type species
- Bulbophyllum epicranthes

Species
- See text

Synonyms
- Epicranthes Blume, 1825

= Bulbophyllum sect. Epicranthes =

Section of flowering plants

Bulbophyllum sect. Epicranthes is a section of the genus Bulbophyllum.

== Description ==
Species in this section have small adpressed pseudobulbs carrying a single, small, elliptic, fleshy leaf.

== Distribution ==
Plants from this section are found from China, Myanmar to Java, Borneo and eastward to New Guinea and New Caledonia.

== Species ==
Bulbophyllum section Epicranthes comprises the following species:

Image	Name	Distribution	Elevation (m)
	Bulbophyllum abbrevilabium Carr 1932	Thailand, Malaysia and Vietnam	700 metres (2,300 ft)
	Bulbophyllum adangense Seidenf. 1979	Thailand	400 metres (1,300 ft)
	Bulbophyllum aquinoi (Cootes, M.Leon & Naive) J.M.H.Shaw 2017	Philippines (Mindanao)	1,220 metres (4,000 ft)
	Bulbophyllum brachyrhopalon J J Verm, O'Byrne and Lamb 2015	Sabah Borneo	1,300–2,340 metres (4,270–7,680 ft)
	Bulbophyllum brachytriche J.J.Verm. & P.O'Byrne 2008	Sulawesi	1,200–1,400 metres (3,900–4,600 ft)
	Bulbophyllum charishampeliae (Cabactulan, M.Leon, Cootes & R.B.Pimentel) R.Rice 2019	Philippines	1,440 metres (4,720 ft)
	Bulbophyllum cheiropetalum Ridl.1926	Peninsular Malaysia, Borneo, New Caledonia and Sumatra	1,000–1,300 metres (3,300–4,300 ft)
	Bulbophyllum chlororhopalon Schltr. 1913	New Guinea	900 metres (3,000 ft)
	Bulbophyllum cimicinum J.J.Verm.1982	Bismark Archipelago	500 metres (1,600 ft)
	Bulbophyllum conchophyllum J.J.Sm. 1912	New Guinea	150 metres (490 ft)
	Bulbophyllum corrugatum J.J.Verm. 2008	Bismark Archipelago	
	Bulbophyllum cyanotriche J.J.Verm. 1996	Sabah Borneo	300 metres (980 ft)
	Bulbophyllum davidii (Cootes & Boos) J.M.H.Shaw 2017	the Philippines	700 metres (2,300 ft)
	Bulbophyllum decarhopalon Schltr.1913	New Guinea	900–1,000 metres (3,000–3,300 ft)
	Bulbophyllum decatriche J.J.Verm. 1991	New Guinea	
	Bulbophyllum dijkstalianum J.J.Verm., de Vogel & A.Vogel 2010	Papua New Guinea	
	Bulbophyllum epicranthes Hook.f. 1890	Myanmar Java, Sumatra, Borneo and the Moluccas	400 metres (1,300 ft)
	Bulbophyllum flavofimbriatum J.J.Sm. 1931	Borneo	800–1,500 metres (2,600–4,900 ft)
	Bulbophyllum glebodactylum (W.Suarez & Cootes) Sieder & Kiehn 2010 publ. 2011	Philippines	
	Bulbophyllum goniopterum J.J. Verm, Obyrne and Lamb 2015	Sarawak Borneo	
	Bulbophyllum haniffii Carr 1932	Burma, Thailand, Malaysia and Laos	800–1,700 metres (2,600–5,600 ft)
	Bulbophyllum heterorhopalon Schltr. 1913	New Guinea	1,000 metres (3,300 ft)
	Bulbophyllum hexarhopalon Schltr. 1906	Bismarck Islands, New Guinea, Fiji and New Caledonia	50–500 metres (160–1,640 ft)
	Bulbophyllum hirudiniferum J.J.Verm. 1982	Papua New Guinea	
	Bulbophyllum jimcootesii (Cabactulan, M.Leon & R.B.Pimentel) R.Rice 2019	Philippines	1,300 metres (4,300 ft)
	Bulbophyllum johannulii J.J.Verm. 1982	Bismark Archipelago	
	Bulbophyllum liorhopalon J J Verm. & Lamb 2013	Sarawak Borneo	
	Bulbophyllum macneiceae Schuit. & de Vogel 2005	Papua New Guinea	1,720–2,310 metres (5,640–7,580 ft)
	Bulbophyllum macrorhopalon Schltr.1913	New Guinea	1,800–2,300 metres (5,900–7,500 ft)
	Bulbophyllum mobilifilum Carr 1929	Malaysia	
	Bulbophyllum neilkonradii (Cabactulan, Cootes, M.Leon & R.B.Pimentel) R.Rice 2019	Philippines	1,300 metres (4,300 ft)
	Bulbophyllum nocturnum J.J.Verm., de Vogel, Schuit. & A.Vogel 2011	Papua New Guinea	240–300 metres (790–980 ft)
	Bulbophyllum novemfilum P.O'Byrne & P.T.Ong 2014	peninsular Malaysia	1,000 metres (3,300 ft)
	Bulbophyllum octorhopalon Seidenf. 1975	peninsular Malaysia	
	Bulbophyllum papillosofilum Carr 1929	Peninsular Malaysia	
	Bulbophyllum phymatum J.J.Verm. 1982	Papua New Guinea	
	Bulbophyllum porphyrotriche J.J.Verm. 1991	Sabah Borneo	1,100 metres (3,600 ft)
	Bulbophyllum psilorhopalon Schltr. 1913	New Guinea	60–500 metres (200–1,640 ft)
	Bulbophyllum rigidifilum J.J.Sm. 1920	Western Sumatra	
	Bulbophyllum sagemuelleri R.Bustam. & Kindler 2015	Negros Occidental, Philippines	
	Bulbophyllum schuitemanii J.J.Verm., 2008	Papua New Guinea	900 metres (3,000 ft)
	Bulbophyllum spodotriche J.J.Verm. & P.O'Byrne 2008	Sulawesi	1,000 metres (3,300 ft)
	Bulbophyllum stenomeris J.J.Verm. & P.O'Byrne 2008	Sulawesi	100–400 metres (330–1,310 ft)
	Bulbophyllum stenorhopalon Schltr. 1921	Papua New Guinea	
	Bulbophyllum streptotriche J.J.Verm. 1991	Borneo	1,300 metres (4,300 ft)
	Bulbophyllum tarantula Schuit. & de Vogel 2005	Papua New Guinea	2,300–2,400 metres (7,500–7,900 ft)
	Bulbophyllum tindemansianum J.J.Verm., de Vogel & A.Vogel 2010	Bismark Archipelago	850 metres (2,790 ft)
	Bulbophyllum tinekeae Schuit. & de Vogel 2005	Papua New Guinea	2,100–2,250 metres (6,890–7,380 ft)
	Bulbophyllum trirhopalon Schltr.1913	New Guinea	1,775–2,400 metres (5,823–7,874 ft)
	Bulbophyllum undecifilum J.J.Sm. 1927	Borneo Java	1,500–1,700 metres (4,900–5,600 ft)
	Bulbophyllum upupops Verm, O'Byrne & Lamb 2015	Sarawak Borneo	450–1,000 metres (1,480–3,280 ft)
	Bulbophyllum vesiculosum J.J.Sm. 1917	Peninsular Malaysia, Sumatra, Sabah Borneo and Sulawesi	0–1,200 metres (0–3,937 ft)
	Bulbophyllum xanthomelanon J.J.Verm. & P.O'Byrne 2008	Sulawesi	1,200 metres (3,900 ft)
	Bulbophyllum wiratnoi Saputra, Schuit., Mustaqim & J.Champ. 2023	New Guinea	114 metres (374 ft)
