= List of islands by name (U) =

This article features a list of islands sorted by their name beginning with the letter U.

== U ==
Island's Name	Island group(s)	Country/Countries
ʻUvea (Wallis)	ʻUvea Mo Futuna	France
U Thant	New York	United States
Uncatena	Elizabeth Islands, Massachusetts	United States
Ugljan	Adriatic Sea	Croatia
Ujae Atoll	Ralik Chain	Marshall Islands
Ujelang Atoll	Ralik Chain	Marshall Islands
Ukeshima	Amami Islands part of the Satsunan Islands part of the Ryukyu Islands	Japan
Ulva	Paterson Inlet, Stewart Island	New Zealand
Umbrella	Georgian Bay, Ontario	Canada
Umm al Maradim	Persian Gulf	Kuwait
Umm al-Na'san	Persian Gulf	Bahrain
Umm an Namil	Persian Gulf	Kuwait
Umm Hazwarah	Hawar Islands	Bahrain
Umm Jinni	Hawar Islands	Bahrain
Unea	Vitu Islands	Papua New Guinea
Unije	Cres–Lošinj archipelago	Croatia
Union	Grenadines of the Lesser Antilles	Saint Vincent and the Grenadines
Unst	Shetland Islands	Scotland
Uotsuri-jima	Senkaku Islands part of the Sakishima Islands part of the Ryukyu Islands	Administered by Japan, Claimed by China and the Republic of China
Upolu	Samoan Islands	Samoa
Upper Grey Cloud	Minnesota	United States
Upper Panther	Arkansas	United States
Upper Twin	Ohio River, West Virginia	United States
Uréparapara	Banks Islands	Vanuatu
Urie Lingey	Shetland Islands	Scotland
Urup	Kuril Islands, Sakhalin Oblast	Russia
Usedom	Baltic Sea	Germany and Poland
Ushant		France
Ushishir	Kuril Islands, Sakhalin Oblast	Russia
Ushkan	Lake Baikal, Siberia	Russia
Ustica	Sicily	Italy
Utirik Atoll	Ratak Chain	Marshall Islands
Utsira	Haugesund, Rogaland	Norway
Uyea	Shetland Islands	Scotland
Uynarey	Shetland Islands	Scotland

== See also ==
- List of islands (by country)
- List of islands by area
- List of islands by population
- List of islands by highest point
