= Vitu =

Vitu may refer to:

== Kenya ==
- Witu, a town on the Kenyan coast
- Witu Sultanate, a former sultanate on the Kenyan coast

== New Guinea ==
- Vitu Islands, near New Guinea
- Vitu language
