= Unea Island =

Island in Papua New Guinea

Unea
Native name: Uniapa
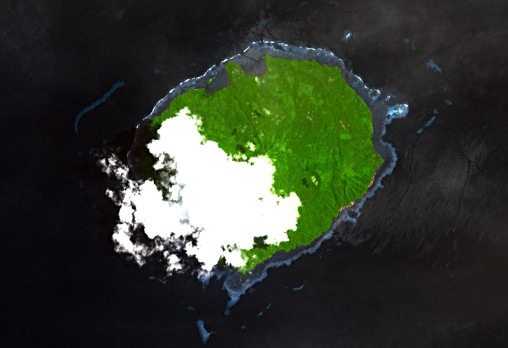

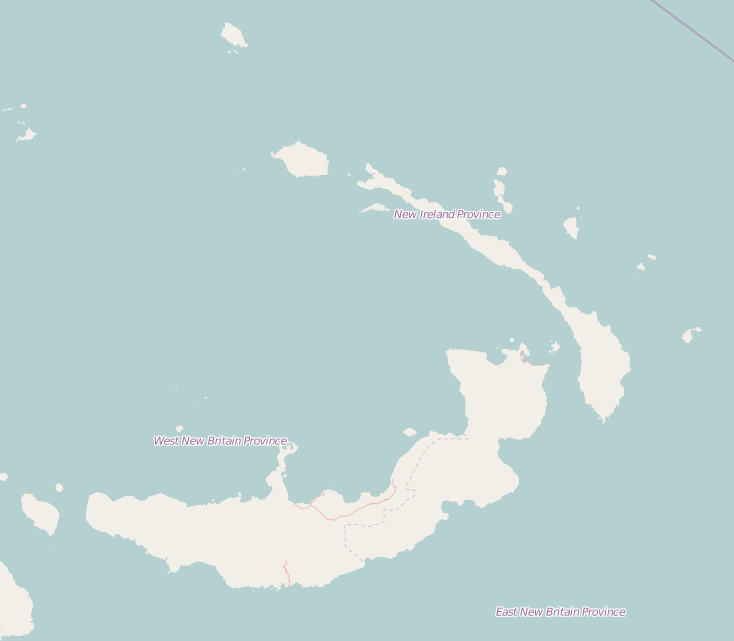
- Location within New Britain Location within Papua New Guinea

Geography
- Location: Melanesia
- Coordinates: 4°53′0″S 149°9′0″E
- Archipelago: Vitu Islands
- Adjacent to: Bismarck Sea

Administration
- Papua New Guinea
- Province: West New Britain Province
- LLG: Bali/Witu Rural LLG

Demographics
- Population: 0 (2011)

Unea Island is an island in Papua New Guinea located in the Vitu Islands. It was occupied by Japan in World War II.

The Uneapa (or Bali) language is natively spoken on this island. In the local language, it is called Uniapa or Uneapa. The term Unea comes from the Vitu language, and they descend from a proto-form *Uneap or *Uniap, reflecting the addition of an echo vowel in Uneapa and the regular loss of final consonants in Vitu.
