= Kimbe Bay =

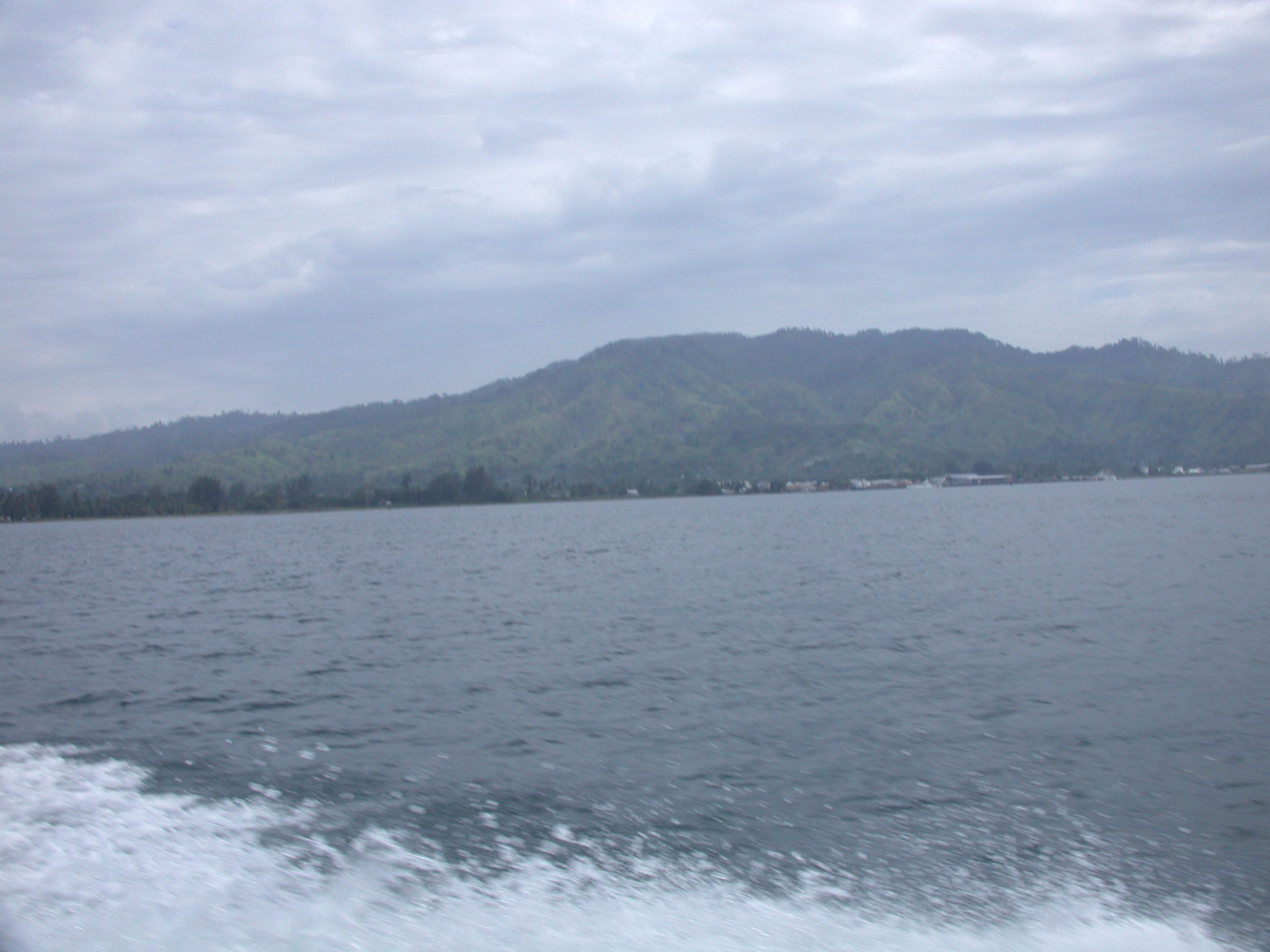

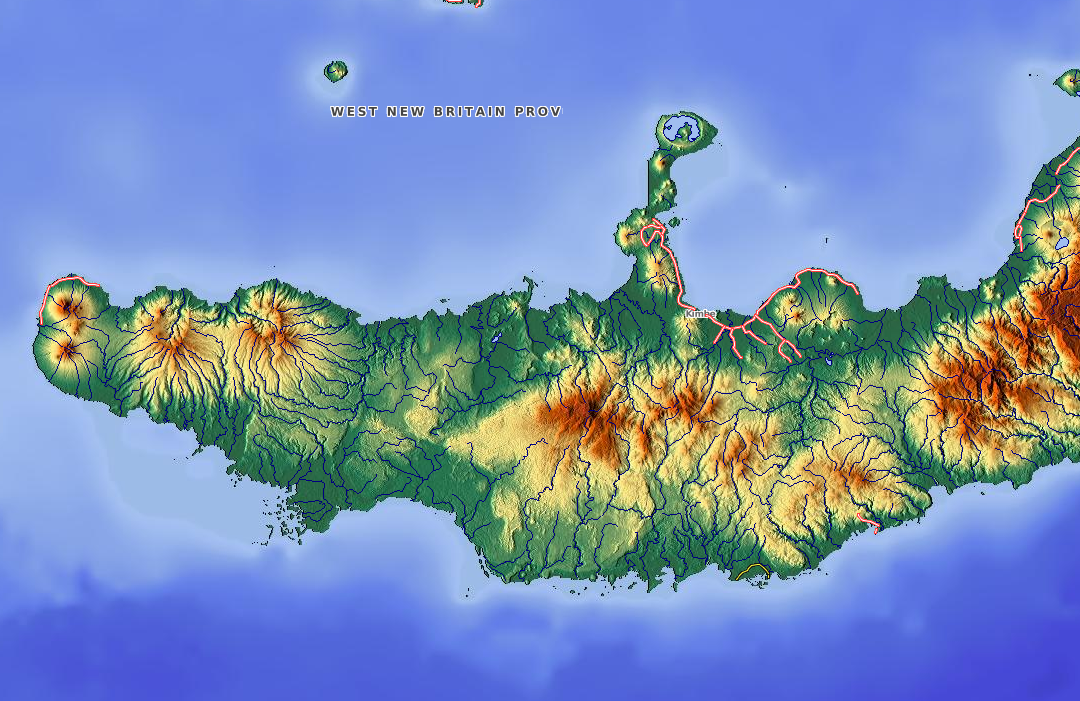
- Location within West New Britain
- Location: Bismarck Sea
- Type: Bay
- Settlements: Kimbe

Kimbe Bay is a large bay in West New Britain Province, off the northern coast of New Britain, Papua New Guinea, at 5.1666667°S 150.5°E. Kimbe Bay is an important biodiversity hotspot. 60 percent of the coral species of the entire Indo-Pacific region live here. Kimbe Bay is the home of more than 860 coral reef fish species. Because of a massive die-off of coral worldwide due to pollution, human activities, and global warming, Kimbe Bay has become increasingly important, since it is seen as one of the last holdouts for coral should the degradation continue. Efforts are currently underway to limit the human impact on the bay. Due to its beauty it is also a popular diving site.

== See also ==
- Stettin Bay
