= Stettin Bay =

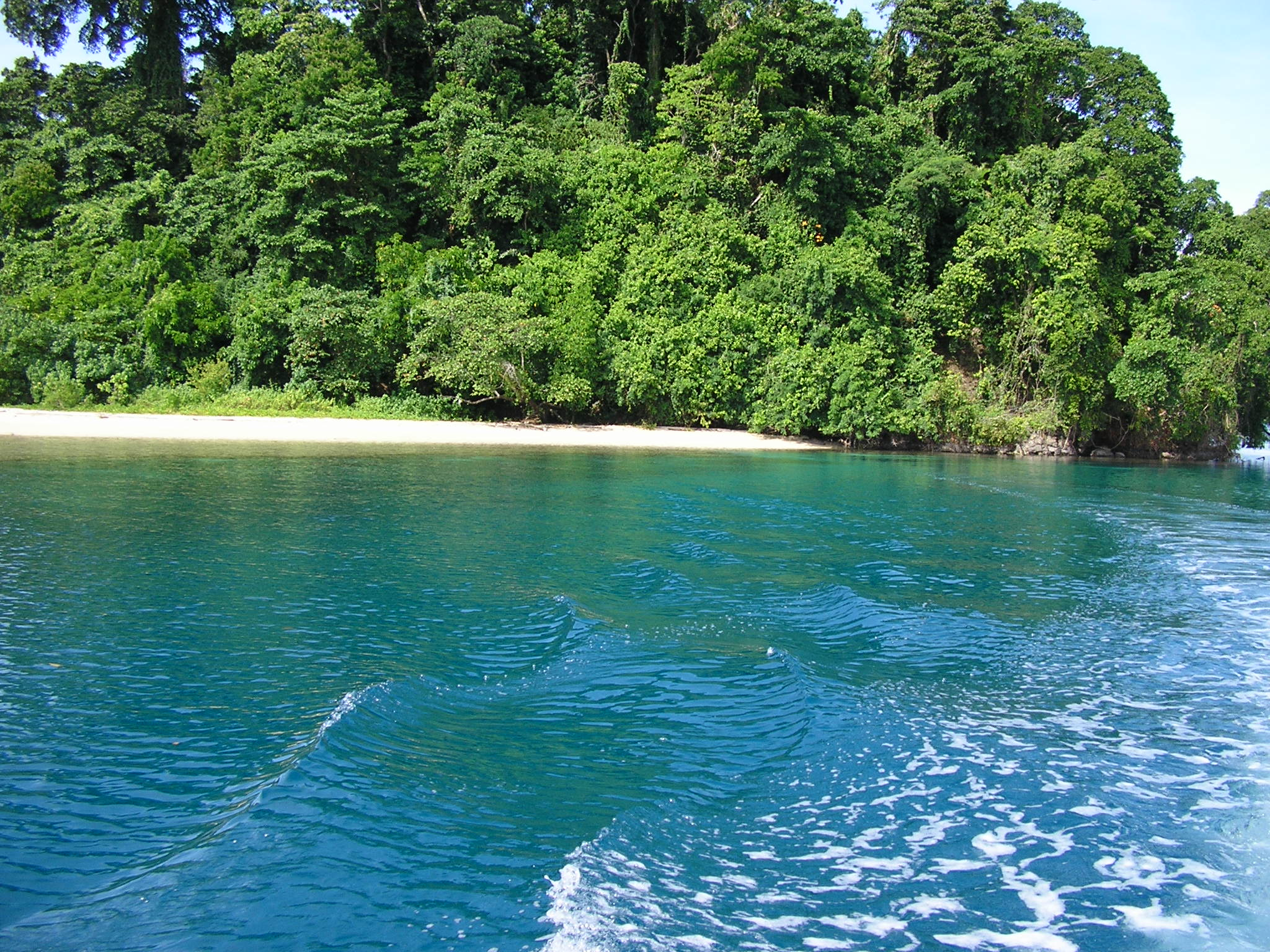
- Restorff Island near town of Kimbe, in Stettin Bay.

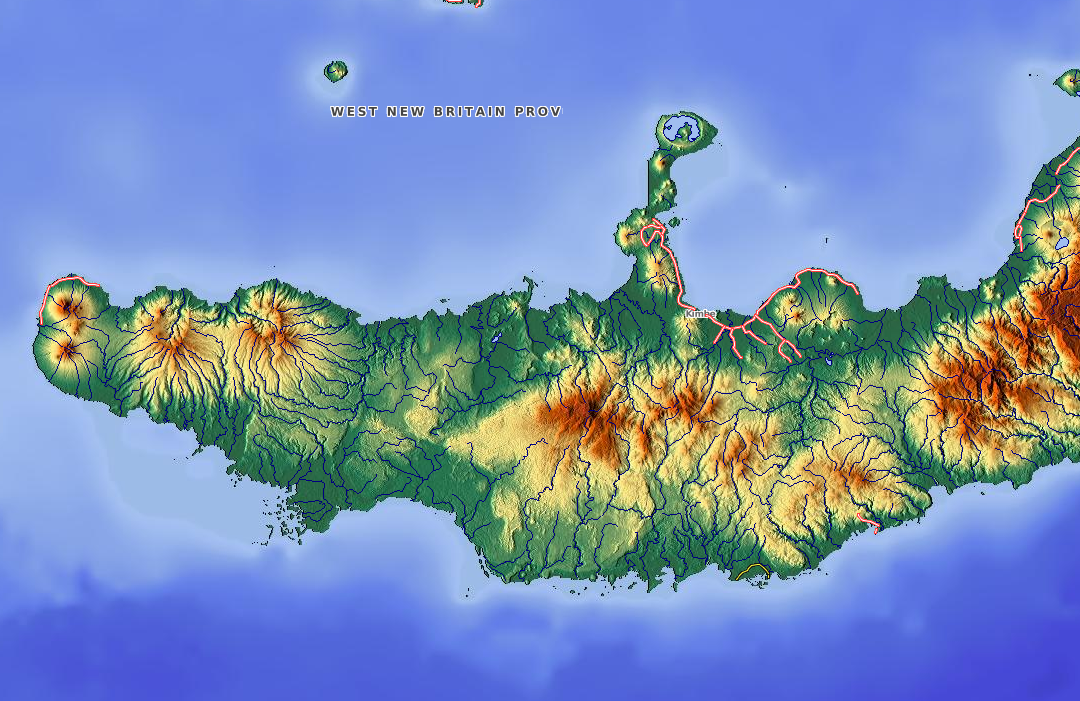
- Location within West New Britain
- Location: Kimbe Bay, Bismarck Sea
- Coordinates: 05°30′07.5″S 150°13′07.06″E
- Type: Bay
- Max. width: 35 kilometres (22 mi)
- Max. depth: 25 kilometres (16 mi)

The Stettin Bay, also spelled as Stetin Bay, is a bay in the Bismarck Sea, within the Pacific Ocean, on the north coast of the island of New Britain. It is located in the Kimbe Bay, between the Willaumez Peninsula to the east, and Hoskins Peninsula to the west, within the West New Britain Province, Papua New Guinea.

== Name ==
The Stettin Bay, also spelled as Stetin Bay, is named after the German-language name of the city of Szczecin, Poland, which is Stettin. It was named as such in the late 19th century, while the island of New Britain, then known as New Pomerania (German: Neupommern), was part of the German New Guinea, a colony of the German Empire. At the time Szczecin was the capital of the Province of Pomerania in Germany. During the colonial era, the bay was known in German as Stettinerbucht (Stettin Bay).

== Characteristics ==
The Stettin Bay is a bay in the Bismarck Sea, within the Pacific Ocean, on the north coats of the island of New Britain. It is located in the Kimbe Bay, between the Willaumez Peninsula to the east, and Hoskins Peninsula to the west, within the West New Britain Province, Papua New Guinea. The bay is around 35 km wide and about 25 km deep. Upstream coral reefs block a large part of the access to the bay. Among them are Grabo Reef, Reeson Reef, Roberts Reef, Mowen Reef, and Fish Reef. Northwest of the bay are the islands of Garua Island, Schaumann Island, and Restorff Island. On the coast of the Stettin Bay is located the town of Kimbe, the capital of West New Britain Province.
