= WIV =

WIV or wiv may refer to:

- WIV, the National Rail station code for Wivenhoe railway station, Colchester, England
- Wuhan Institute of Virology
- Vitu language, Papua New Guinea
