= Bali/Witu Rural LLG =

Local-level government in Papua New Guinea

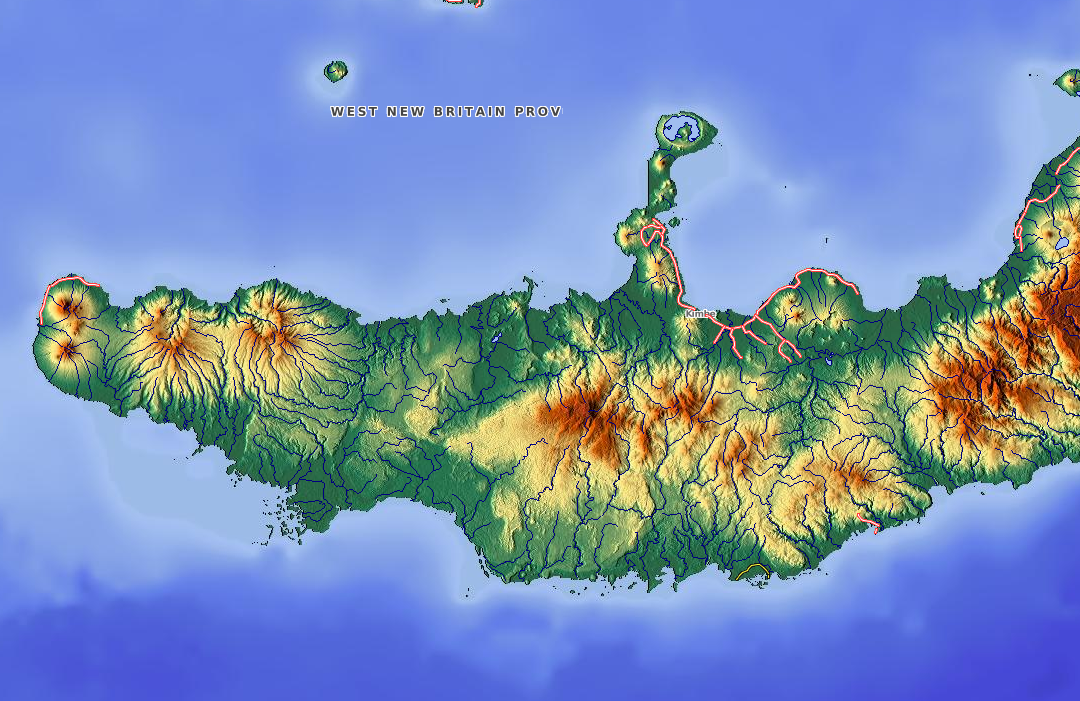
- Location within Papua New Guinea
- Coordinates: 4.8443°S 149.1861°E
- Country: Papua New Guinea
- Province: West New Britain Province
- Time zone: UTC+10 (AEST)

Bali/Witu Rural LLG is a local-level government (LLG) of West New Britain Province, Papua New Guinea. The Bali and Vitu languages are spoken in the LLG.

== Wards ==
- 01. Penata
- 02. Garomatong
- 03. Kumburi
- 04. Lovanua
- 05. Mundua
- 06. West Garove
- 07. East Garove
