= Kandrian Airport =

Airport in Kandrian, West New Britain, Papua New Guinea

- IATA: KDR; ICAO: AYKC

Summary
- Location: Kandrian, Papua New Guinea
- Elevation AMSL: 300 ft / 91 m
- Coordinates: 6°12′30″S 149°32′30″E

Map
- Location of airport in Papua New Guinea

Runways
| Direction | Length | | Surface |
| Direction | m | ft | Surface |
|---|---|---|---|
| 17/35 | 1,050 | 3,444 |
- Source: PNG Airstrip Guide

Kandrian Airport is an airport in Kandrian, in the West New Britain Province of Papua New Guinea.

== Facilities ==
The airfield has an elevation of 300 feet (91 m) above mean sea level and has a 1,050-metre (3,445 ft) runway designated 17/35.

== Airlines and destinations ==
(no known scheduled services)
