= Tony Puana =

Papua New Guinea politician

Tony Puana (born 13 October 1973) is a Papua New Guinea politician. He was a member of the National Parliament of Papua New Guinea since from 2007 to 2012, representing the Kandrian-Gloucester Open electorate.

Puana, who comes from the village of Kilenge in the Cape Gloucester region, defeated People's National Congress Party MP David Sui, who had been the member for the seat since 2002. He was appointed Shadow Minister for Works, Transport and Civil Aviation by Opposition Leader Sir Mekere Morauta in early September.

Puana was arrested in November 2010 and charged with 40 counts of dishonest application, false pretence and the alleged misappropriation of over PGK2.5 million of government funds.

He was defeated by Joseph Lelang of the Coalition for Reform Party at the 2012 election.
