= Bialla Rural LLG =

Local-level government in Papua New Guinea

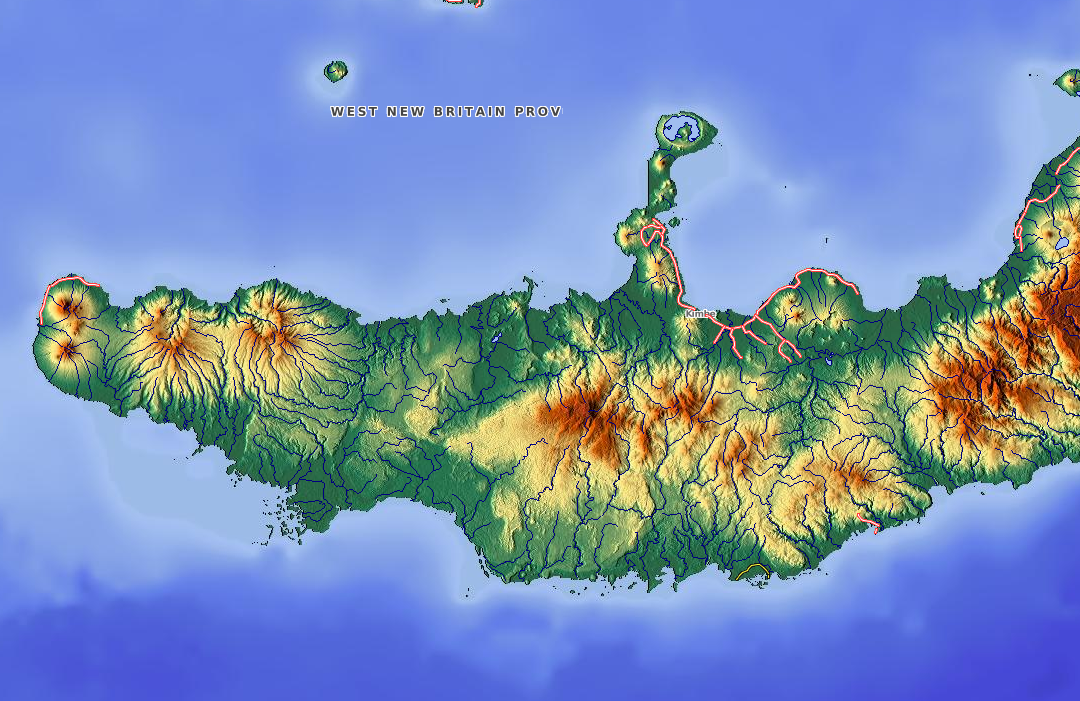
- Location within Papua New Guinea
- Coordinates: 5.318657°S 151.028711°E
- Country: Papua New Guinea
- Province: West New Britain Province
- Time zone: UTC+10 (AEST)

Bialla Rural LLG is a local-level government (LLG) of West New Britain Province, Papua New Guinea. The Lower dialect of the Ata language is spoken in the LLG.

Starting from the 1960s, Fred Hargesheimer, an American pilot whose life was saved by the locals of the area, developed much of the area's infrastructure.

== Wards ==
- 01. Baia
- 02. Noau
- 03. Ubili
- 04. Navo
- 05. Lolobau
- 06. Kambaia
- 07. Soi
- 08. Barema
- 09. Vilelo
- 10. Ewasse
- 11. Bialla
- 12. Tiauru
- 13. Sale / Malasi
- 14. Sale / Sege
- 15. Uasilau
- 16. Silanga
- 17. Pasusu
- 18. Ubae / Bilomi
- 19. Mangaseng
- 20. Bialla
