= Kimbe Urban LLG =

Local-level government in Papua New Guinea

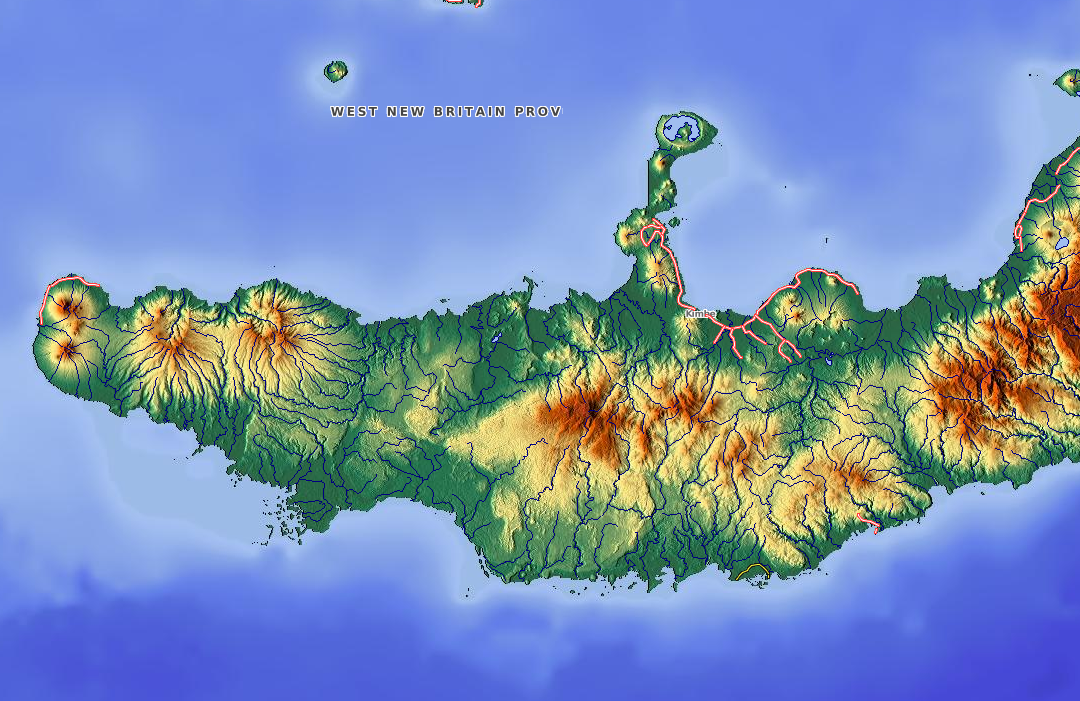
- Location within Papua New Guinea
- Coordinates: 5.558696°S 150.162597°E
- Country: Papua New Guinea
- Province: West New Britain Province
- Time zone: UTC+10 (AEST)

Kimbe Urban LLG is a local-level government (LLG) of West New Britain Province, Papua New Guinea.The current Mayor of Kimbe town is Hon. Nick Tupi. The LLG covers the town of Kimbe.

== Wards ==
- 80. Kimbe Urban
