= Gloucester Rural LLG =

Local-level government in Papua New Guinea

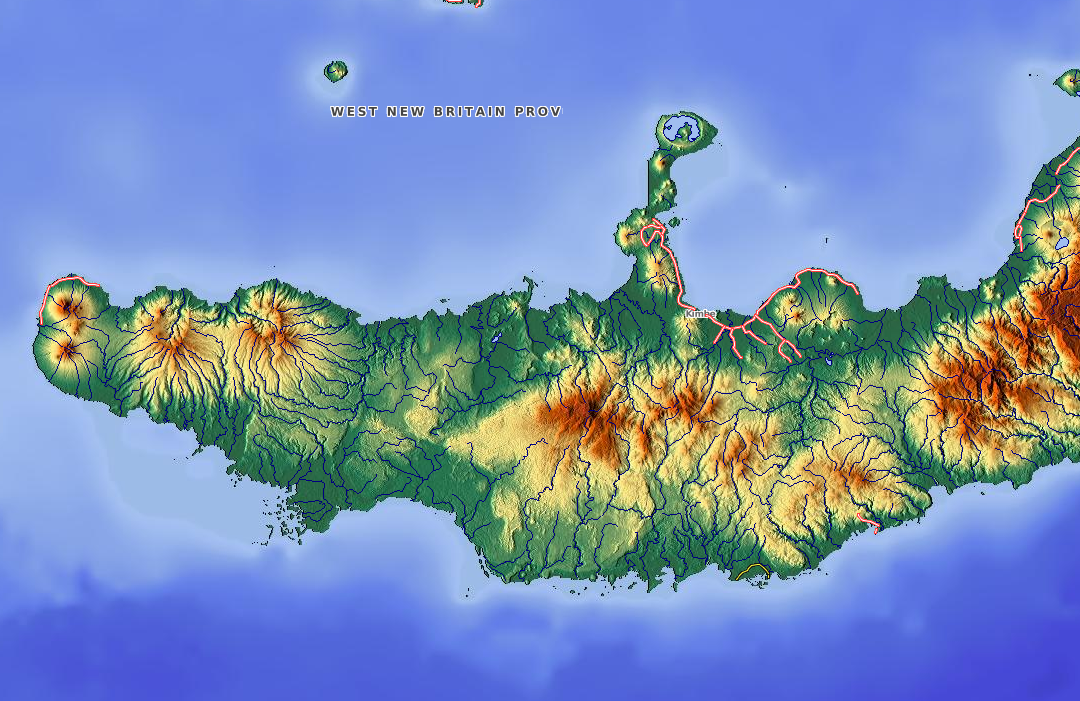
- Location within Papua New Guinea
- Coordinates: 5.52102°S 148.517°E
- Country: Papua New Guinea
- Province: West New Britain Province
- Time zone: UTC+10 (AEST)

Gloucester Rural LLG is a local-level government (LLG) of West New Britain Province, Papua New Guinea.

== Wards ==
- 01. Aumo
- 02. Aisega
- 03. Somate
- 04. Kilenge
- 05. Airagilpua
- 06. Gakiu
- 07. Alaido
- 08. Gurrissi
