= Kandrian =

- Village
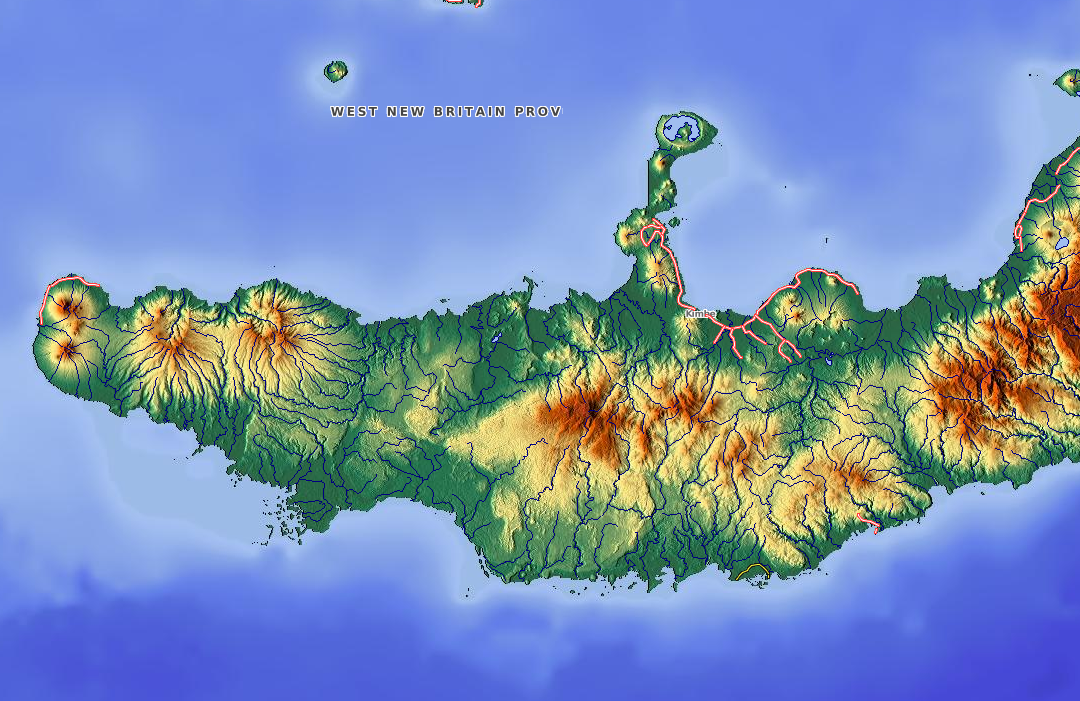
- Location in West New Britain
- Coordinates: 6°13′S 149°33′E
- Country: Papua New Guinea
- Province: West New Britain Province
- District: Kandrian-Gloucester District
- Climate: Af

Kandrian is the headquarters of Kandrian-Gloucester District, West New Britain Province, Papua New Guinea.

== See also ==
- Kandrian Airport
- Kandrian Coastal Rural LLG
- Kandrian Inland Rural LLG
- Kandrian-Gloucester District
