= USS Gato (SS-212) =

United States Navy lead ship Gato-class submarine

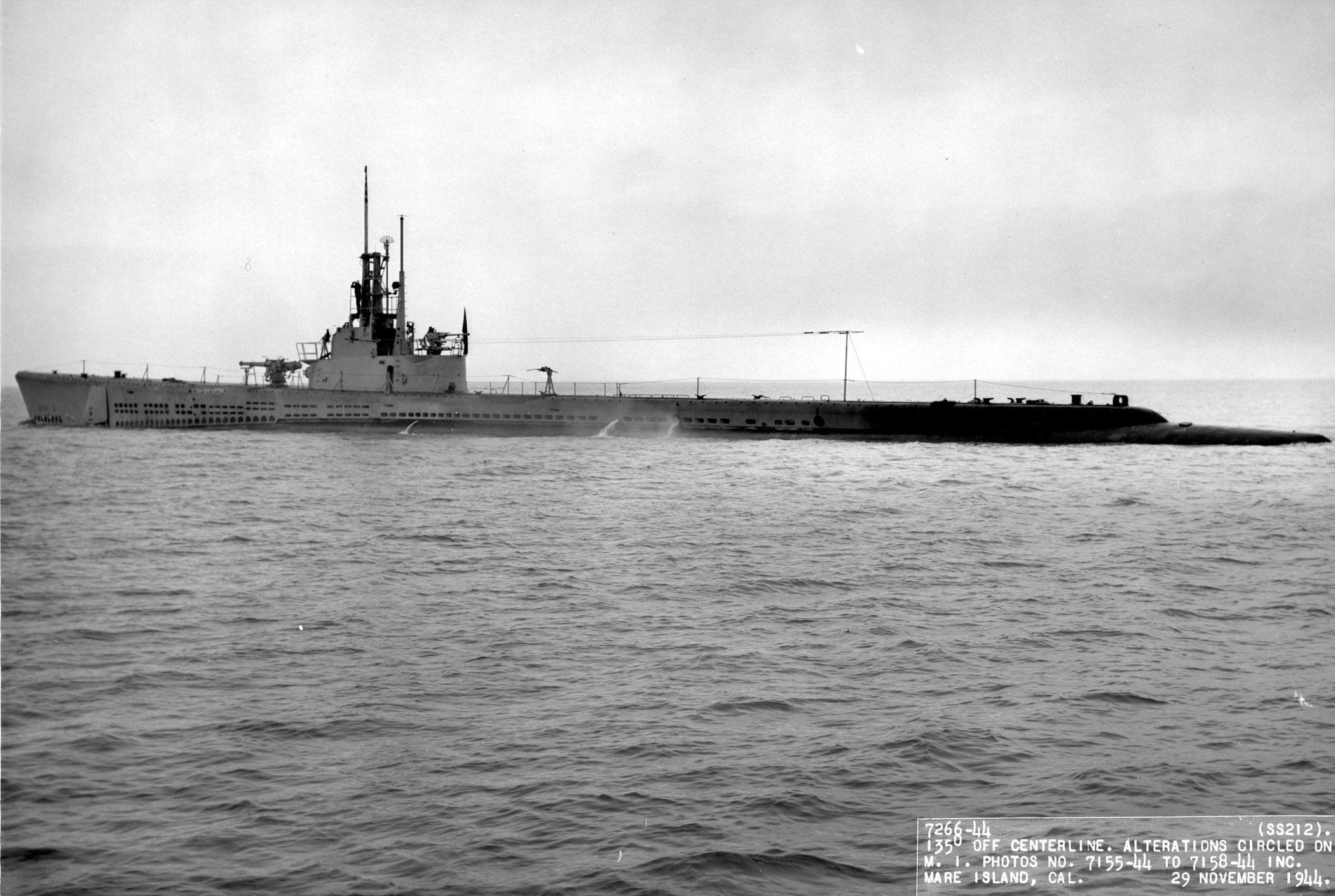
- USS Gato (SS-212) off Mare Island Navy Yard on 29 November 1944

History

United States
- Name: Gato
- Namesake: Gato shark
- Builder: Electric Boat Company, Groton, Connecticut
- Laid down: 5 October 1940
- Launched: 21 August 1941
- Commissioned: 31 December 1941
- Decommissioned: 16 March 1946
- Stricken: 1 March 1960
- Honors and awards: 13 × battle stars; Presidential Unit Citation
- Fate: Sold for scrap, 25 July 1960

General characteristics
- Class & type: Gato-class diesel-electric submarine
- Displacement: 1,525 tons (1,549 t) surfaced; 2,424 tons (2,460 t) submerged
- Length: 311 ft 9 in (95.02 m)
- Beam: 27 ft 3 in (8.31 m)
- Draft: 17 ft 0 in (5.18 m) maximum
- Propulsion: 4 × General Motors Model 16-248 V16 Diesel engines driving electric generators; 2 × 126-cell Sargo batteries; 4 × high-speed General Electric electric motors with reduction gears; two propellers; 5,400 shp (4.0 MW) surfaced; 2,740 shp (2.0 MW) submerged
- Speed: 21 knots (39 km/h) surfaced; 9 knots (17 km/h) submerged
- Range: 11,000 nm (20,000 km) surfaced at 10 knots (19 km/h)
- Endurance: 48 hours at 2 knots (4 km/h) submerged; 75 days on patrol
- Test depth: 300 ft (90 m)
- Complement: 6 officers, 54 enlisted
- Armament: 10 × 21-inch (533 mm) torpedo tubes; 6 forward, 4 aft; 24 torpedoes; 1 × 4-inch (102 mm) / 50 caliber deck gun; Bofors 40 mm and Oerlikon 20 mm cannon

USS Gato (hull number SS-212) was the lead ship of her class of submarine in the United States Navy. She was the first Navy ship named for the common name used for a number of species of catshark. She was commissioned only days after the declaration of war and made thirteen combat patrols during World War II. She survived the war and spent the post-war period as a training ship before being sold for scrapping in 1960.

== Construction and commissioning ==
Gato′s keel was laid down 5 October 1940 by the Electric Boat Company of Groton, Connecticut. She was launched 21 August 1941, sponsored by Mrs. Louise Ingersoll, wife of Admiral Royal E. Ingersoll, and commissioned 31 December 1941.

== January – April 1942 ==
After shakedown at New London, Connecticut, Gato departed 16 February 1942 via the Panama Canal for San Francisco, California, where she underwent additional training. She was at periscope depth while conducting a trim dive in the Pacific Ocean off the entrance to San Francisco Bay on 23 March 1942 when the U.S. Navy TC-class blimp TC-13 mistook her for a Japanese submarine and attacked her with four 325-pound (147 kg) depth charges. The first two depth charges landed within 50 yards (46 m) of her periscope and the second pair exploded as she dived to a depth of 120 feet (37 m). She suffered extensive damage but no casualties. It was the only friendly fire incident between a U.S. Navy blimp and a submarine during World War II.

After repairs at Mare Island Navy Yard in California, Gato was ready for sea again on 27 March 1942. She subsequently proceeded to Pearl Harbor, Hawaii.

== First war patrol, April – June 1942 ==
On her first war patrol from Pearl Harbor (20 April – 10 June 1942), Gato unsuccessfully attacked a converted aircraft carrier 3 May before being driven away by the fierce depth charging of four destroyers off the Marshall Islands. On 24 May 1942 she was ordered to patrol the western approaches to Midway Atoll in the Northwestern Hawaiian Islands, taking station 280 nautical miles (519 km; 322 mi) westward during the Battle of Midway of 3–7 June 1942.

== Second and third war patrols, July – December 1942 ==
On her second war patrol (2 July – 29 August 1942), she patrolled east of the Kurile Islands toward the Aleutian chain. She obtained four torpedo hits with unconfirmed damage to a ship 15 August 1942, and terminated her patrol at Dutch Harbor, Alaska. Her third patrol (4 September – 23 December 1942) included operations off Kiska; then she steamed via Midway and Pearl Harbor to Truk atoll, where her attack 6 December on a convoy was broken off by aerial bombs and a severe depth charge attack by three destroyers. This patrol terminated at Brisbane, Australia, 23 December 1942.

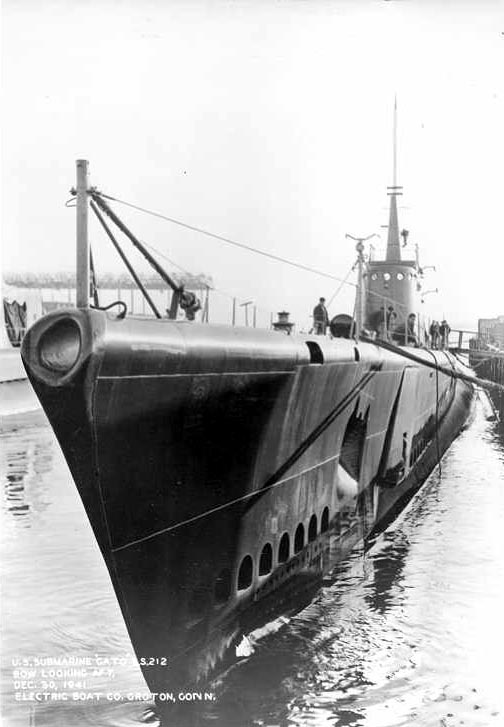
USS Gato (SS-212), December 1941

== Fourth and fifth war patrols, January – June 1943 ==
During her seventh war patrol (13 January 1943 – 26 February 1943), Gato torpedoed and sank transport Kenkon Maru 21 January; cargo ship Nichiun Maru on 29 January; and cargo ship Suruya Maru on 15 February—all off New Georgia, Solomon Islands. On her fifth war patrol (19 March – 6 June 1943), she landed an Australian intelligence party at Toep, Bougainville, 29 March 1943, and evacuated 27 children, nine mothers, and three nuns, transferring them on 31 March to the submarine chaser SC-531 off Ramos, Florida Island. During a submerged radar attack approach 4 April 1943, between Tanga and Lihir Islands, she was shaken so violently by three exploding depth charges that she returned to Brisbane for temporary repairs 11 to 20 April. Gato landed more Australian commandos at Toep Harbor 29 May, transported more evacuees to Ramos Island, and then reconnoitered off Tarawa in the Gilbert Islands before putting in at Pearl Harbor 6 June 1943.

== Sixth and seventh war patrols, August 1943 – January 1944 ==
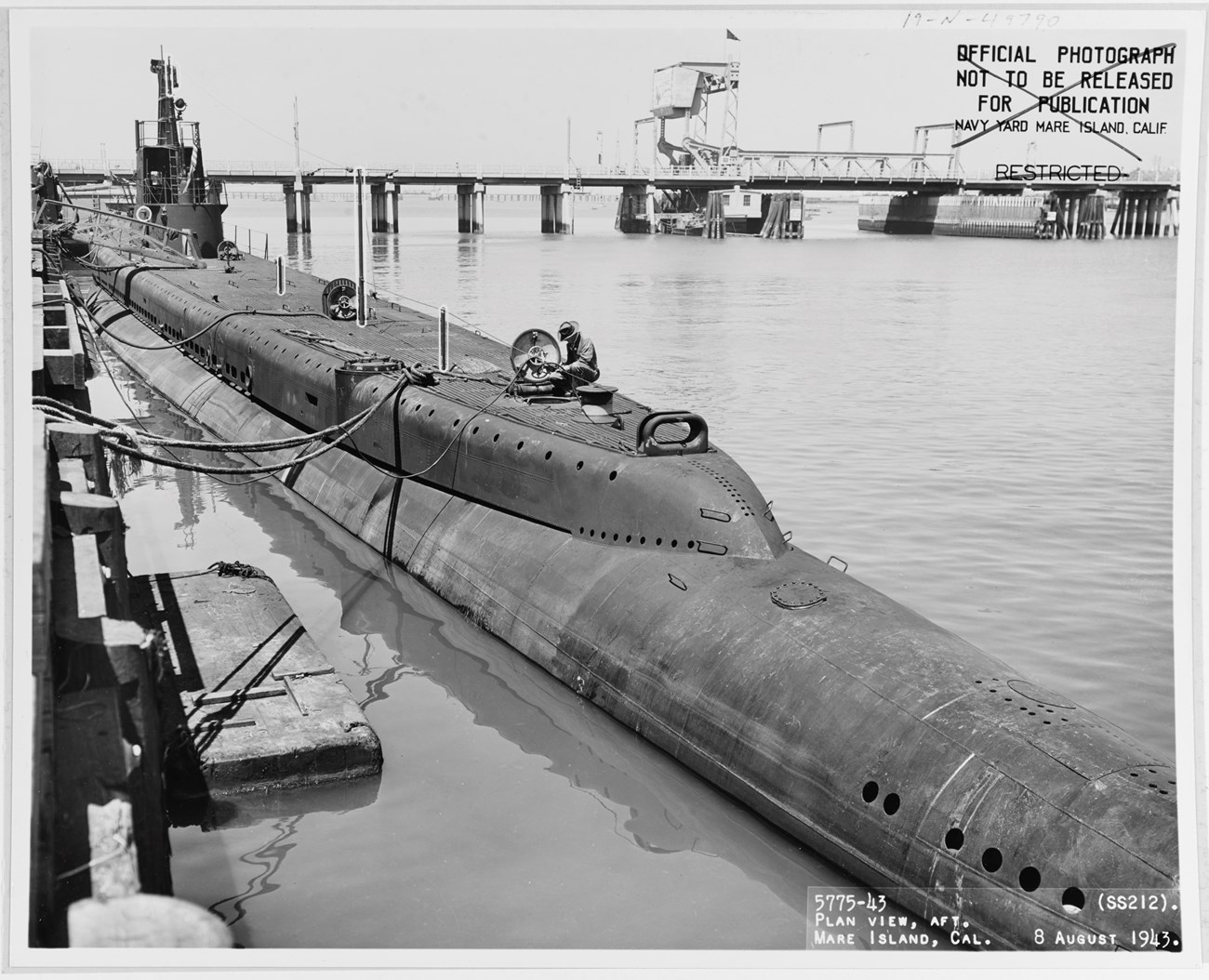
The Gato docked at the Mare Island Naval Shipyard in August 1943

Gato was overhauled at Mare Island; returned to Pearl Harbor 22 August 1943; and conducted her sixth war patrol (6 September – 28 October) via Truk and Bougainville in the Solomons to Brisbane. En route on 19 October she attacked a convoy, scoring hits for unknown damage to two large cargo ships. Her seventh war patrol (18 November 1943 – 10 January 1944) took her north of the Bismarck Archipelago. On 30 November she made a coordinated attack with Ray, sinking the cargo ship Columbia Maru. She rescued a Japanese soldier from a life raft on 16 December, then attacked a convoy in the Saipan-Massau traffic lanes four days later to sink cargo ship Tsuneshima Maru and scored damaging hits on another freighter. After two hours of dodging depth charges, she finally evaded her attackers, surfaced, and headed for Tingmon, the most likely port for the damaged cargo ship. Gato discovered a live depth charge on her deck at the same time two enemy escorts were sighted headed in her direction. She outran them while disposing of the depth charge by setting it adrift on a rubber raft. Although she did not overtake the cargo ship, she did sight a convoy. On 2 December her chase was foiled by a float plane, which was driven off by Gato's gunners. She concluded the patrol at Milne Bay, New Guinea, 10 January 1944.

== Eighth, ninth and tenth war patrols, February – September 1944 ==
Gato departed Milne Bay 2 February 1944 for her eighth war patrol, in the Bismarck-New Guinea-Truk area. She rescued Fred Hargesheimer and two other downed airmen on 5 February. She sank a trawler off Truk on 15 February, transport Daigen Maru No.3 on 26 February, and cargo ship Okinoyama Maru No.3 on 12 March. Two other trawlers were destroyed by her guns before she returned to Pearl Harbor on 1 April 1944.

On her ninth war patrol (30 May 1944 – 2 June 1944) Gato took Vice Admiral Charles A. Lockwood to Midway; completed photographic reconnaissance of Woleai Island, served on lifeguard station for air strikes on Truk 11 to 18 June, and terminated her patrol at Majuro atoll. Her 10th war patrol saw her on lifeguard 15 July 1944 for the carrier air strike on Chichi Jima, during which she rescued two aviators. She returned to Pearl Harbor on 2 September 1944, proceeded to Mare Island for overhaul and then returned to Pearl Harbor.

== Eleventh and twelfth war patrols, January – June 1945 ==
On her 11th war patrol (28 January – 13 March 1945), Gato patrolled the Yellow Sea as a unit of a coordinated attack group (called a "wolf pack"), with Jallao (SS-368) and Sunfish (SS-281). She sank a coast defense ship on 14 February and cargo ship Tairiku Maru on 21 February, then returned to Guam. She departed on her 12th war patrol 12 April 1945, taking lifeguard station in support of the invasion of Okinawa. On the night of 22 – 23 April she had a brief contest with two Japanese submarines and narrowly missed destruction as well-aimed torpedoes came close. Between 27 and 30 April she rescued 10 Army aviators from shallow water near the beaches of Cape Toi Misaki, Kyūshū. She returned to Pearl Harbor 3 June 1945.

== Thirteenth war patrol and end of war ==
Gato departed on her 13th and last war patrol on 8 July for lifeguard station duty, then to support air strikes on Wake Island, and then patrolled off the eastern coast of Honshū. She received word of the "Cease Fire" on 15 August while making an attack approach on a sea truck. She steamed into Tokyo Bay 31 August and remained for the signing of surrender documents on board Missouri on 2 September.

== Post-World War II ==
Gato departed Tokyo Bay on 3 September 1945 and proceeded via Pearl Harbor and the Panama Canal to the New York Naval Shipyard in Brooklyn, New York, where she was decommissioned on 16 March 1946. She served for a number of years as a United States Naval Reserve training vessel at New York City and later at Baltimore, Maryland, until she was stricken from the Naval Vessel Register on 1 March 1960. She was sold to the Northern Metals Company of Philadelphia, Pennsylvania, on 25 July 1960 for scrapping.

== Awards ==
- Presidential Unit Citation in recognition of accomplishments during war patrols four through eight
- Asiatic-Pacific Campaign Medal with 13 battle stars
- World War II Victory Medal
- Navy Occupation Service Medal with "ASIA" clasp

== In media ==
Gato is the subject of "The Gato Story," a 1958 episode of the syndicated television anthology series The Silent Service, which aired in the United States from 1957 to 1959.

A Gato-class submarine was used for a portion of the stock footage in the 1959 motion picture Up Periscope starring James Garner and Edmond O'Brien. The footage shows a unique array on the fantail of the submarine.
