= Uneapa language =

Oceanic language

Uneapa
- Bali
- Uniapa
- Native to: Papua New Guinea
- Region: Bali Island, West New Britain
- Native speakers: (10,000 cited 1998)
- Language family: Austronesian: Malayo-Polynesian; Oceanic; Meso-Melanesian; Bali–Vitu; Uneapa

Language codes
- ISO 639-3: bbn
- Glottolog: unea1237

Uneapa (often called "Bali", natively Uniapa) is an Oceanic language spoken by about 10,000 people on the small island of Bali (Uneapa), north of West New Britain in Papua New Guinea. It is perhaps a dialect of neighboring Vitu. Uneapa is one of the most conservative Oceanic languages, having retained most of Proto-Oceanic's final consonants with an echo vowel, such as *Rumaq 'house' > rumaka and *saqat 'bad' > zaɣata.

A sketch grammar of this language was published in 2002 by Malcolm Ross.

== Name ==
The name Uneapa is a variation of the native name Uniapa for the island. In Vitu, the same island is called Unea. Both names can come from a proto-form *Uniap or *Uneap, reflecting the addition of an echo vowel in Uneapa and the regular loss of final consonants in Vitu.

The alternative name Bali, used by foreigners, comes from the term bali meaning 'to be not'. It is not related etymologically to the more popular Indonesian island called Bali, which is home to a distantly related language called Balinese.

== Classification ==
Uneapa, together with neighboring Vitu, forms a subgroup within the Meso-Melanesian cluster of the Oceanic languages. The two are sometimes considered to be a single language, called Bali-Vitu. However, there are some differences, particularly in their phonemic inventories, retention of final consonants (which is lost in Vitu), pronoun systems, and word choices. In general, Uneapa tends to be more conservative than Vitu in most respects.

== Phonology ==
Phonemically, Uneapa has five vowels and fourteen consonants.

Uneapa vowels
	front unrounded	back rounded
close	i	u
mid	e	o
open	a	

Uneapa consonants
		labial	alveolar	velar
nasal		m ⟨m⟩	n ⟨n⟩	ŋ ⟨ng⟩
plosive	voiceless	p ⟨p⟩	t ⟨t⟩ (Note: /t/ can sometimes be affricated as [t͡s] before /i/.)	k ⟨k⟩
plosive	voiced	b ⟨b⟩ (Note: Prenasalied [ᵐb] when word-medial.)	d ⟨d⟩ (Note: Prenasalied [ⁿd] when word-medial.)	g ⟨g⟩ (Note: Prenasalied [ᵑg] when word-medial.)
fricative		β ⟨v⟩ (Note: Can be realized as [w], especially before /a/, /o/ or /u/.)	z ⟨z⟩ (Note: Can be realized as [ɹ].)	ɣ ⟨h⟩ (Note: Can be realized as [h].)
trill			r ⟨r⟩	
approximant			l ⟨l⟩	

Uneapa has a simple phonotactic structure, either V, CV, VV, CVV. Stress is located at the penultimate syllable. Optionally, clitic-final vowels may be lost, such as underlying balitaza 'is not' becoming baltaza.

== Example sentence ==
The following sentence illustrates the conservatism of Uneapa relative to Proto-Oceanic.

Uneapa:

a rumaka zaɣata
ART house bad
'a bad house'

Proto-Oceanic:

*a Rumaq saqat
ART house bad
'a bad house'
