= Talasea Rural LLG =

Local-level government in Papua New Guinea

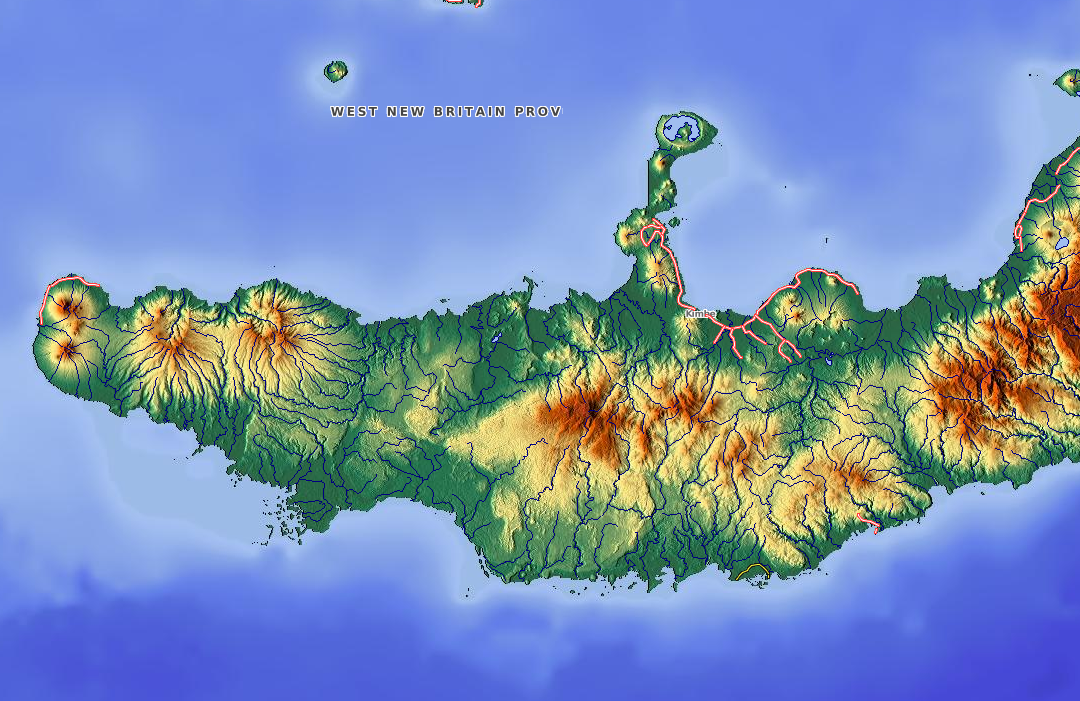
- Location within Papua New Guinea
- Coordinates: 5.30806°S 150.042°E
- Country: Papua New Guinea
- Province: West New Britain Province
- Time zone: UTC+10 (AEST)

Talasea Rural LLG is a local-level government (LLG) of West New Britain Province, Papua New Guinea.

== Wards ==
- 01. Nalobu
- 02. Boge
- 03. Gabuna
- 04. Bola
- 05. Warou
- 06. Tabekemeli
- 07. Bulu
- 08. Valupai
- 09. Baliondo
- 10. Bunga
