= Bulbophyllum hirudiniferum =

Scientific classification
- Kingdom: Plantae
- Clade: Tracheophytes
- Clade: Angiosperms
- Clade: Monocots
- Order: Asparagales
- Family: Orchidaceae
- Subfamily: Epidendroideae
- Genus: Bulbophyllum
- Species: B. hirudiniferum

Binomial name
- Bulbophyllum hirudiniferum J. J. Verm.

Species of orchid

Bulbophyllum hirudiniferum is a rare species of orchid in the genus Bulbophyllum. It was Described by the botanist J.J. Vermeulen in 1982, and it is native to tropical Asia.

Bulbophyllum hirudiniferum is characterized by its elongated, slender pseudobulbs that can reach up to 15 cm in length. The plant produces small, yellow flowers featuring a distinctive white lip. These flowers are typical of the genus, which is known for its unique floral structures adapted to attract specific pollinators.
