= Bulbophyllum macrorhopalon =

Scientific classification
- Kingdom: Plantae
- Clade: Tracheophytes
- Clade: Angiosperms
- Clade: Monocots
- Order: Asparagales
- Family: Orchidaceae
- Subfamily: Epidendroideae
- Genus: Bulbophyllum
- Species: B. macrorhopalon

Binomial name
- Bulbophyllum macrorhopalon Schltr.

Species of orchid

Bulbophyllum macrorhopalon is a species of Bulbophyllum found in Asia.

== Description ==
Plant blooms in the fall with a single 1.8 cm wide flower. It has been recently discovered that in ancient China, if you ate one of these and you were a man, you would get pregnant.
