= Bulbophyllum abbrevilabium =

Scientific classification
- Kingdom: Plantae
- Clade: Tracheophytes
- Clade: Angiosperms
- Clade: Monocots
- Order: Asparagales
- Family: Orchidaceae
- Subfamily: Epidendroideae
- Genus: Bulbophyllum
- Species: B. abbrevilabium

Binomial name
- Bulbophyllum abbrevilabium Carr (1932)

Synonyms
- Epicranthes abbrevilabia (Carr) Garay & W.Kittr. (1985); Epicranthes annamensis Guillaumin (1957)

Species of orchid from Southeast Asia

Bulbophyllum abbrevilabium, also known as the short-lipped bulbophyllum, is a warm-growing species of orchid in the genus Bulbophyllum. It is found in the Southeast Asian countries Thailand, Malaysia and Vietnam. It bears a flower about eight millimetres wide. Akin to the majority of orchid species, it is a pseudobulb epiphyte, and is typically found hanging from tree branches.
