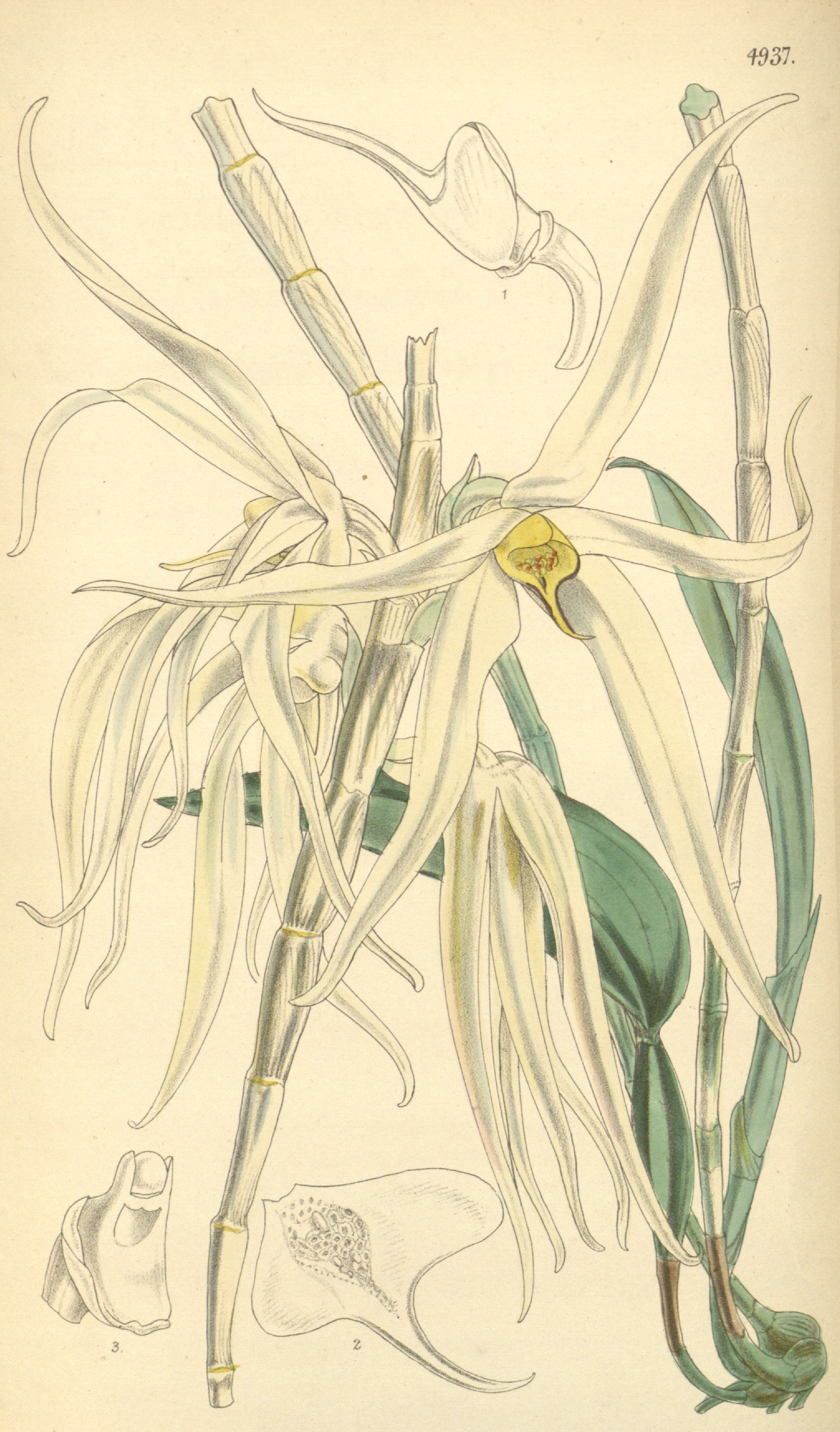

Scientific classification
- Kingdom: Plantae
- Clade: Tracheophytes
- Clade: Angiosperms
- Clade: Monocots
- Order: Asparagales
- Family: Orchidaceae
- Subfamily: Epidendroideae
- Genus: Dendrobium
- Species: D. amboinense

Binomial name
- Dendrobium amboinense Hook. (1856)

Synonyms
- Callista amboinensis (Hook.) Kuntze (1891); Euphlebium amboinense (Hook.) Brieger (1981)

= Dendrobium amboinense =

Species of orchid

Dendrobium amboinense, the Amboin Island dendrobium, is an ephemeral flowering lowland species of orchid in the subtribe Dendrobiinae.

The species is endemic to the island of Ambon and nearby islands in the Banda Sea, in Indonesia.

== Description ==
Dendrobium amboinense has pseudobulbs that reach about 50 centimetres (20 in) in height. They produce two or three leaves about 6 centimetres (2.4 in) long and about 2.5 centimetres (0.98 in) wide.

The flowers, up to four per inflorescence, are produced on very short racemes. Both leafless and leaved pseudobulbs are capable of producing an inflorescence. The flowers are up to 20 centimetres (7.9 in) across. The sepals and petals droop producing a distinctly wispy appearance.

Flowers open at night and are completely closed by the following sundown. Freshly opened flowers are bone white, and as the afternoon progresses the color slowly changes to a pale shade of burnished orange.

== See also ==
- Endemic orchids of Indonesia
- List of Dendrobium species
