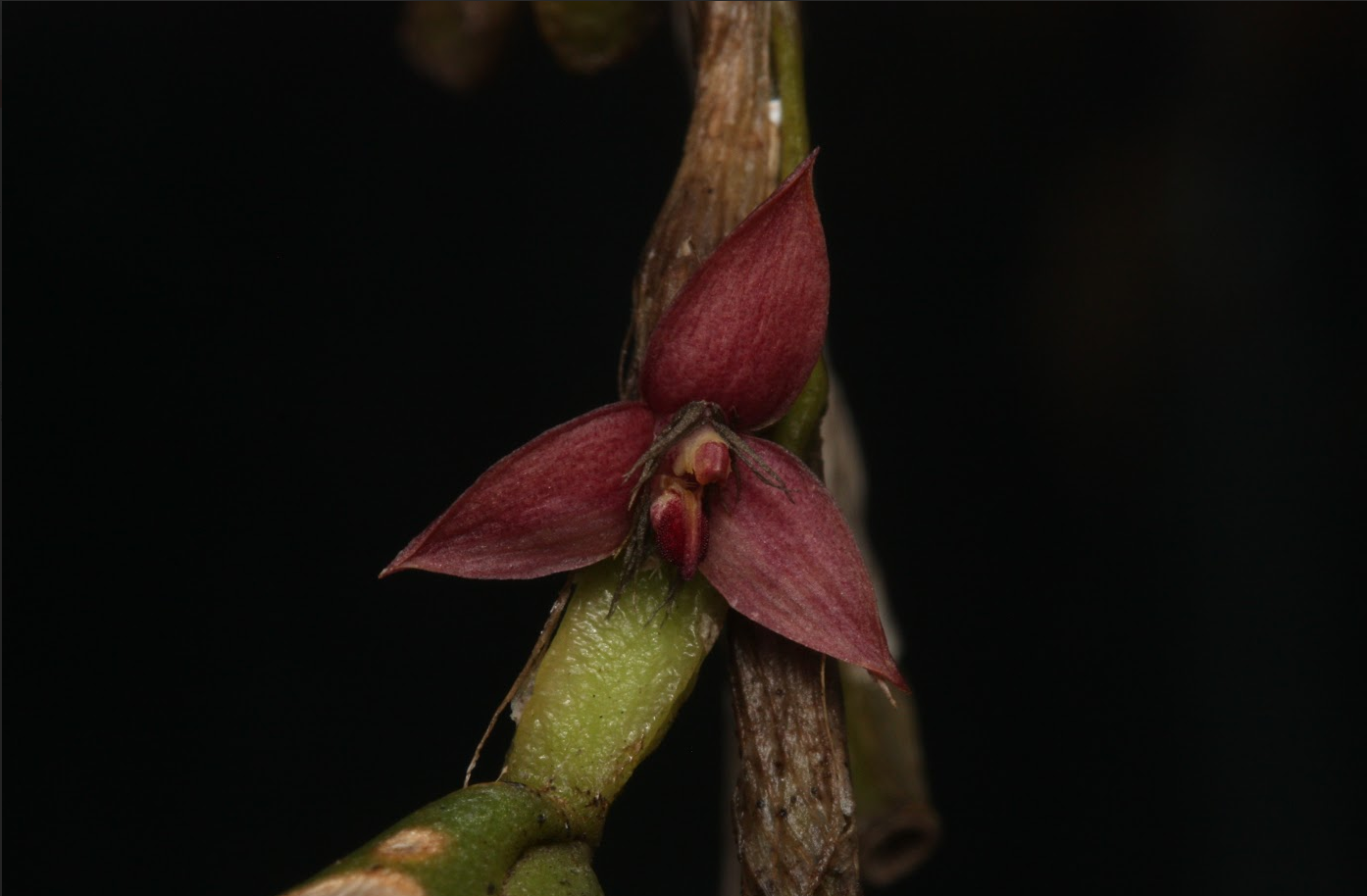
- Flower of Bulbophyllum sagemuelleri

Scientific classification
- Kingdom: Plantae
- Clade: Tracheophytes
- Clade: Angiosperms
- Clade: Monocots
- Order: Asparagales
- Family: Orchidaceae
- Subfamily: Epidendroideae
- Genus: Bulbophyllum
- Species: B. sagemuelleri

Binomial name
- Bulbophyllum sagemuelleri R.Bustam. & Kindler

= Bulbophyllum sagemuelleri =

Species of orchid

Bulbophyllum sagemuelleri is a species of orchid in the genus Bulbophyllum endemic to Negros Occidental, Philippines. It is named after Reinhard Sagemüller, father of Filipino Orchid Enthusiast Josef Sagemüller. It is placed in section Epicranthes (which includes the former genus Epicranthes).
