= Kandrian-Gloucester District =

- Location within Papua New Guinea
- Coordinates: 6.199°S 149.534°E
- Country: Papua New Guinea
- Province: West New Britain Province
- Capital: Kandrian

Government
  - MP: Joseph Lelang

Area
  - Total: 12,499 km^{2} (4,826 sq mi)

Population (2011 census)
  - Total: 74,265
  - Density: 5.9417/km^{2} (15.389/sq mi)
- Time zone: UTC+10 (AEST)

Kandrian-Gloucester District is a district of the West New Britain Province of Papua New Guinea. Its capital is Kandrian.
