= Joseph Lelang =

Papua New Guinean politician

The Honourable Joseph Lelang MP

Leader of the Opposition
- In office 12 August 2022 – 16 February 2024
- Prime Minister: James Marape
- Preceded by: Patrick Pruaitch
- Succeeded by: Douglas Tomuriesa

Member of the National Parliament of Papua New Guinea for Kandrian-Gloucester Open
- Incumbent
- Assumed office 2012
- Preceded by: Tony Puana

Joseph Dennis Lelang is a Papua New Guinea politician from the People's National Congress and the Member of Parliament for Kandrian-Gloucester District. Since 12 August 2022, he has been Leader of the Opposition until 16 February 2024.

He has bachelor's degree in economics from the University of Papua New Guinea, and a master's degree in economics from the University of Glasgow.
