= Kimbe =

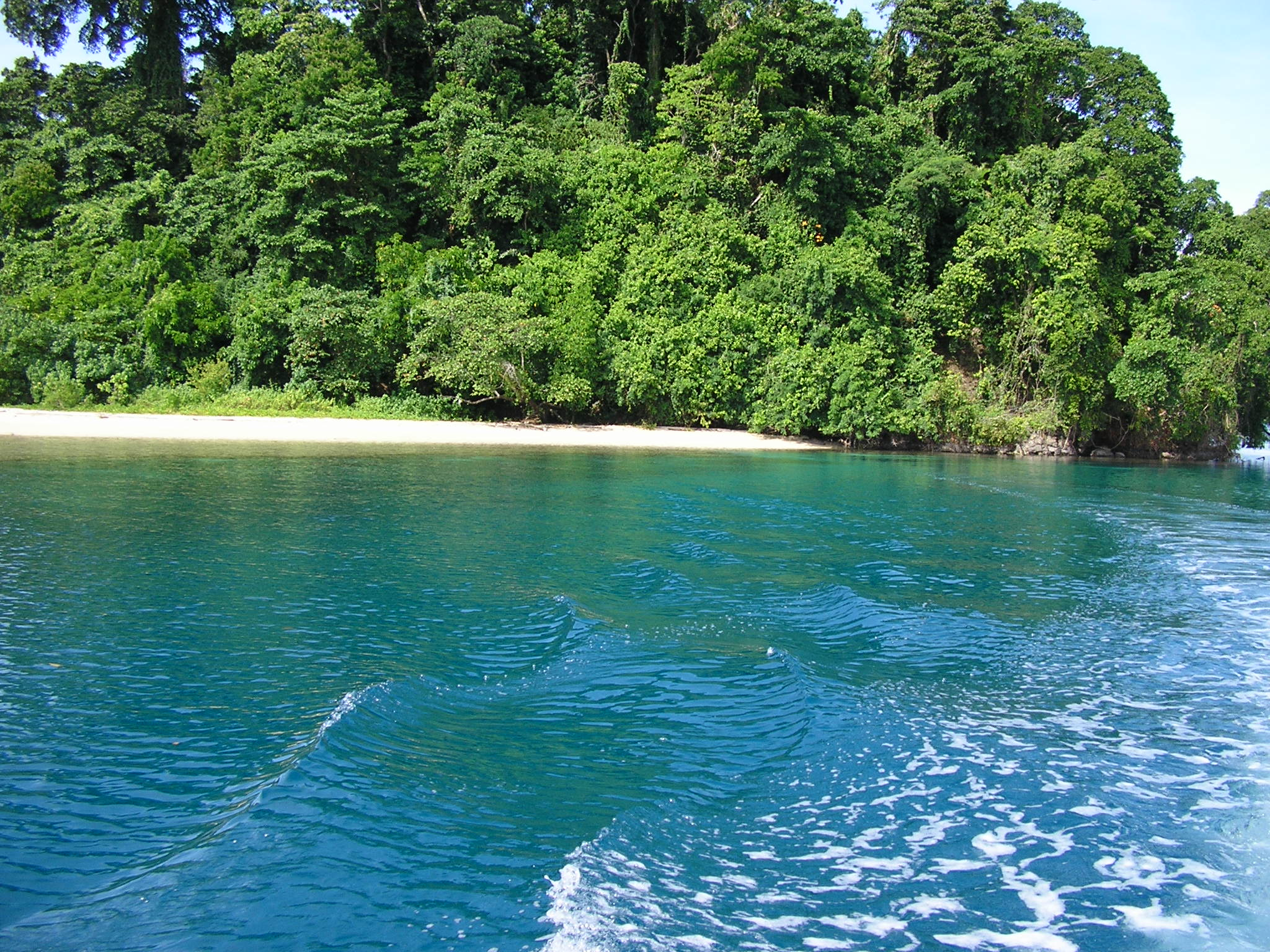
- Restorf Island

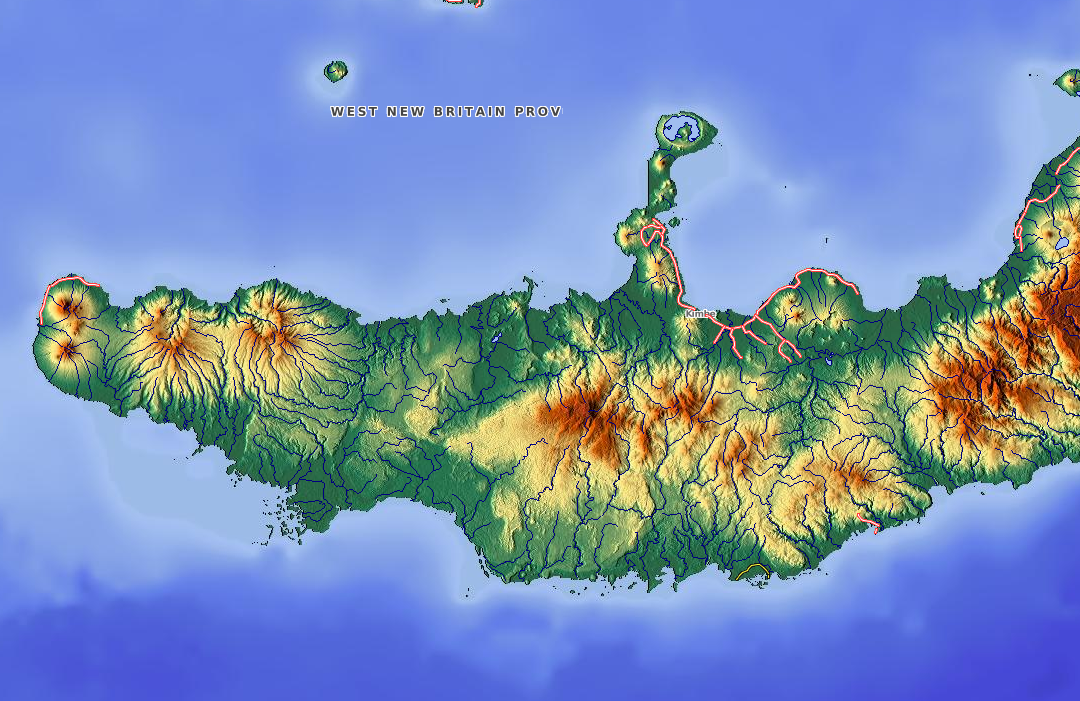
- Location within New Britain and Ireland Kimbe (West New Britain)
- Coordinates: 05°33′27″S 150°09′18″E
- Country: Papua New Guinea
- Province: West New Britain
- District: Talasea District
- LLG: Kimbe Urban
- Elevation: 4 m (13 ft)

Population (2013)
  - Total: 27,191

Languages
  - Main languages: Bola, Tok Pisin, English
- Time zone: UTC+10 (AEST)
- Postcode: 621
- Climate: Af

Kimbe is the capital of the province of West New Britain in Papua New Guinea, and the largest settlement on the island. The bustling town of Kimbe is the third largest port in Papua New Guinea and is the fastest growing city in the South Pacific. The town of Kimbe is served by Hoskins Airport.

The town is administered under Kimbe Urban LLG in West New Britain Province.

== Industry ==
Kimbe town is the center of many industries, including palm oil, cocoa, logging and coconut plantations. Many of these products are shipped out using Kimbe's main port. The biggest industry in West New Britain and Papua New Guinea itself is called New Britain Palm Oil Limited, or NBPOL, which is also the owner of Ramu Agriculture. The company's headquarters is in Mosa, a small town around 12 kilometres (7.5 mi) from Kimbe's main area. The company grows oil palm and then uses the fruit to create palm oil which is used in cooking oil, shampoo, soap, body products, moisturisers and many other products. The oil is produced by 4 oil mills and 1 refinery. The names of the mills are Mosa Oil Mill, Kumbanga Oil Mill, Numundo Oil Mill, Kapiura Oil Mill, Kumbungo Kernal Mill and Kumbungo Oil Refinery. The company also has a cattle station which is used as food for the region. The employees of the company are not only paid but are served with free electricity, water, TV and housing.

== Climate ==
Kimbe has a tropical rainforest climate (Köppen Af) with heavy rainfall year-round.

Climate data for Kimbe
Month	Jan	Feb	Mar	Apr	May	Jun	Jul	Aug	Sep	Oct	Nov	Dec	Year
Mean daily maximum °C (°F)	30.5 (86.9)	30.2 (86.4)	30.3 (86.5)	30.2 (86.4)	30.0 (86.0)	29.8 (85.6)	28.9 (84.0)	29.2 (84.6)	30.2 (86.4)	30.2 (86.4)	30.7 (87.3)	30.3 (86.5)	30.0 (86.1)
Daily mean °C (°F)	26.9 (80.4)	26.8 (80.2)	26.8 (80.2)	26.6 (79.9)	26.6 (79.9)	26.4 (79.5)	25.8 (78.4)	25.8 (78.4)	26.4 (79.5)	26.6 (79.9)	26.8 (80.2)	26.8 (80.2)	26.5 (79.7)
Mean daily minimum °C (°F)	23.4 (74.1)	23.4 (74.1)	23.3 (73.9)	23.0 (73.4)	23.2 (73.8)	23.0 (73.4)	22.8 (73.0)	22.4 (72.3)	22.7 (72.9)	23.0 (73.4)	23.0 (73.4)	23.3 (73.9)	23.0 (73.5)
Average rainfall mm (inches)	465 (18.3)	587 (23.1)	568 (22.4)	393 (15.5)	204 (8.0)	92 (3.6)	141 (5.6)	120 (4.7)	142 (5.6)	170 (6.7)	277 (10.9)	386 (15.2)	3,545 (139.6)

== Education ==
Schools located in Kimbe include:

- Kimbe International School
- Mora Mora Technical School
- Kimbe Secondary school
- Hoskins Secondary School
- New Tribes Mission
- Mahonia Na Dari marine education program
- New Britain International School (owned by NBPOL)
- International Training Institute
