= Vitu Islands =

Islands in Papua New Guinea

Coordinates: 4°40′S 149°18′E

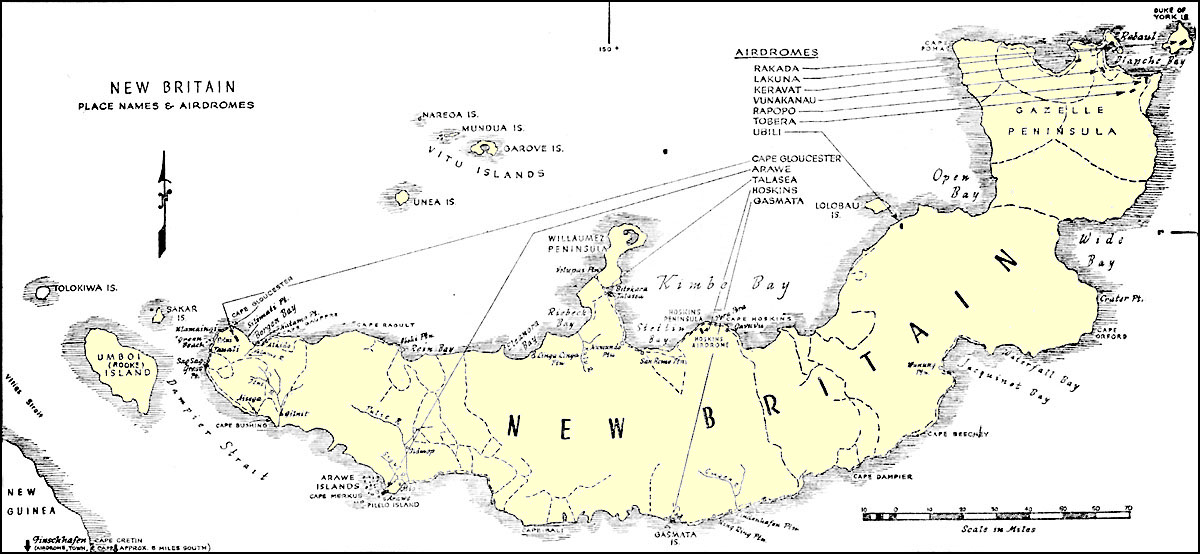
The Vitu Islands are to the north of New Britain

The Vitu Islands /ˈviːtuː/ are a volcanic group with an area of 37 sq mi (96 km^{2}) located in the Bismarck Sea off New Britain, in the southwestern Pacific Ocean. They are not technically part of the Bismarck Archipelago. Administratively they are part of Papua New Guinea. Formerly called the French Islands, the group is sometimes known as the Witu Islands.

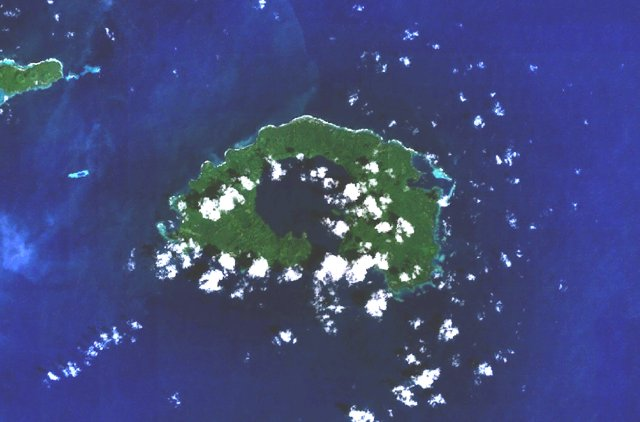
Satellite Imagery of Garove Island

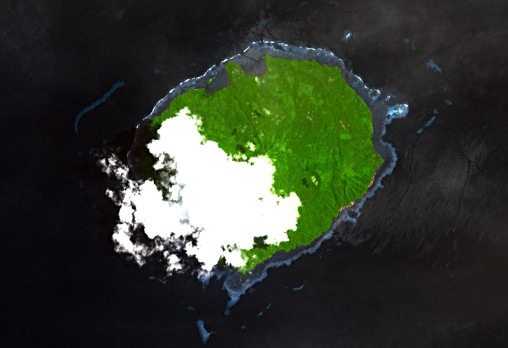
Satellite Imagery of Unea Island

== Geography ==
The islands are volcanic ocean peaks, much as they are reef-ringed, not atolls, and are thereby highly fertile. Garove (Vitu, or Big Witu) and Unea (Bali) are the largest islands. The group was the chief copra centre of Papua New Guinea, although cocoa is now the main crop harvested due to the depressed prices available for copra.

The islands are situated west of north of the Willaumez Peninsula, on the north coast of New Britain, with Unea some 40 nautical miles (74 km) east of south of the main group, and the remaining other islands Mundua (Ningau), situated eleven kilometres (7 mi.) northwest of Garove, and Naragé some twenty-four kilometres (15 mi.) northwest of Mundua, the final extension of the subaqueous peaks chain being the Ottilian Reef (Attilian Reef) a further twenty-two kilometres northwest of Naragé, this last all but totally submerged at all tide states, and dangerous to shipping. Sometimes the submerged Whirlwind Reef a further fifty-eight kilometres to the southwest of the Ottilian Reef is included in the island arc.

== History ==
Naragé is a post-explosive-eruption volcanic remnant of some 21 hectares (52 acres) of what was an island of 61 hectares (151 acres) prior to an eruption that occurred in approximately 1892. The resulting tsunami reached 100 metres on impact on Ningau, wiping out all but two persons of the lowest-lying of three villages - Goru - (they were absent on Garove) and caused major disruption and reduction of population over a wide area of the north coastal areas of New Britain and quite possibly New Guinea and the Western Islands group, plus other islands. A wave of such magnitude would have made the 1997 Itape wave little more than a reef or shore break.

In German times prior to World War I this was - outside of Kokopo, at Rabaul - the stomping ground and major enterprise of the American-Samoan, Queen Emma, whose island group H/Q was Langu plantation, Vitu, and whose manager, a Dane named Peter Hansen, became quite famous for his retinue of concubines, some 26 in number, this the more surprising as the male:female birth ratio in Vitu proper was of the order of 103 males:100 females post-weaning. That is reversed upon Unea, and the social doyens of the upper Witus are or were the ladies happily bride-stolen by the Mundua and Witu lads on wife raids, there being no bride price to pay, and this keeping the populations pretty much stable and balanced wrt genders and genetic make-up. These figures are from the late 1960s and may not apply today, as one in fifty persons in Nuigini are now positive to HIV (Air Nuigini In-Flight magazine, Sept. 2009). Nonetheless it is an extremely rare occurrence wrt population make-up.

On expulsion of the Germans post World War I the group was acquired by the island trading group Burns Philp, plantations comprising Lama, Meto, Ilia and Langu on "Big Vitu" - Garove - and Ningau as the plantation whole for Mundua-Naragé. Edward Hann was plantation manager on Ningau for approximately 36 years. During World War 2 the Japanese landed on one end of the Ningau and he was lucky enough to escape on the other side of the island. Langu was ceded by Burns Philp to the Coote family post World War II as compensation for the execution of their family head and Burns Philp Rabaul store manager by the Japanese for refusing them the keys to Burns Philp's Rabaul enterprises on invasion, and for the duration of the war Vitu was occupied by Japanese who had the sense to treat the native population well. Nonetheless, Coast-Watch activities proceeded, and one Tumbuan Tuagolo, or "Talasea" of Mundua acted as guide to Eric Feldt within the New Britain area. One of the greater claims to international fame of Vitu is that a daughter of the Langu manager for the Coote family, and later, owner, Richard {"Dick"] Doyle became Miss Nuigini.

Under the German Roman Catholic mission at Vuonopope, Kokopo, a mission was established inside the caldera which is the bulk of Garove, a wise choice considering the Group's exposure and sea-states at times of both the NW Monsoon and the SE Trades, the island comprising basically at places only the precipitous higher ground of the caldera rim.

This mission, Peterhafen, was the redoubt of the notorious militant German Archbishop Wolffe, and was to the left of the passage outside the entrance to which the Australian Navy laid blockade to the German raider of the same name - Wolf - which lay behind the entrance island to the caldera with her masts dropped to not be in visibility, all guns laid. in hope of luring the Australians in. Her call there was both protective and for purposes of de-fouling of the hull, her max speed being just eleven knots with economical cruise of eight knots, clean.

Peter Hanson pioneered Witu plantings his headquarters was at the Meto plantation not at Langu. Langu was planted in 1911. The Coote Family acquired Langu after 1946 when Dianna Martell (née Coote) inherited 50% when Mrs Baker died late 1946. Coote family bought out the other 50% from GB Sowerby. Dick Doyle acquired Langu 100% in 1993 his daughter Tania won Miss PNG a year later (1994).

A tsunami passed through Witu in 1888 when the Ritter volcano near Gloucester collapsed into the sea. The wave was about 50 feet (15.2 m) immediately in the Ritter area, about 25 feet (7.6 m) at Witu and 6 feet (1.8 m) in Rabaul.

In 1952 a Catholic mission was established on Witu inside the big caldera that forms Johanne Albrecht Harbour.
