= Vitu language =

Oceanic language spoken in Papua New Guinea

Vitu
- Muduapa
- Vitu, Mudua
- Native to: Papua New Guinea
- Native speakers: (8,800 cited 1991)
- Language family: Austronesian: Malayo-Polynesian; Oceanic; Meso-Melanesian; Bali–Vitu; Vitu
- Writing system: Latin

Language codes
- ISO 639-3: wiv
- Glottolog: mudu1242

Vitu (also spelled Witu or Vittu, referred by their own speakers as pole matotota 'true speech' or pole Vitu 'Vitu speech') or Muduapa is an Oceanic language spoken by about 7,000 people on the islands northwest of the coast of West New Britain in Papua New Guinea.

== Name ==
The name Vitu is an endonym. The alternative name, Muduapa, is an exonym from the neighboring Uneapa (or Bali) language spoken on Bali Island, which is in Vitu known as Mudua, referring to an island northwest of Vitu proper. Mudua and Muduapa can come from a proto-form *Muduap, reflecting the addition of an echo vowel in Bali and the regular loss of final consonants in Vitu.

== Classification ==
Vitu and Bali form a subgroup within the Meso-Melanesian cluster of the Oceanic languages. Vitu is so closely related to the neighbouring Uneapa (or Bali) language that the two are sometimes considered to be a single language, called Bali-Vitu. However, there are some differences, particularly in their phonemic inventories, retention of final consonants (which is lost in Vitu), pronoun systems, and word choices. In general, Bali tends to be more conservative than Vitu in most respects.

== Phonology ==
=== Vowels ===
	Front	Back
High	i	u
Mid	e	o
Low	a	

=== Consonants ===
		Labial	Coronal	Velar
Nasal		m	n	ŋ
Plosive	voiceless	p	t	k
Plosive	prenasalized	ᵐb	ⁿd	ᵑɡ
Fricative		β	ð	ɣ
Sibilant			(s)	
Liquid	rhotic		r	
Liquid	lateral		l	

/t/ is realized as [tʃ] before /i/.

/s/ occurs only in loanwords from Tok Pisin, such as sikul 'school'.

=== Phonotactics ===
No consonant clusters or final consonants are allowed in native Vitu words: all syllables have a CV or V structure. Loanwords, however, may have different structures.

== Writing system ==
Vitu is written in the Latin script. Only between 15% and 25% of speakers of Vitu are literate in the language, but many more are literate in Tok Pisin, the national language of Papua New Guinea.

A a	B b	D d	E e	G g	H h	I i	K k	L l	M m
/a/	/ᵐb/	/ⁿd/	/e/	/ᵑɡ/	/ɣ/	/i/	/k/	/l/	/m/
N n	Ng ng	O o	P p	R r	S s	T t	U u	V v	Z z
/n/	/ŋ/	/o/	/p/	/r/	/s/	/t/	/u/	/β/	/ð/

== Grammar ==
=== Morphology ===
Complex voice systems so characteristic of Austronesian languages of Taiwan and the Philippines undergo significant reduction in most Austronesian languages of Eastern Indonesia and Oceania. Vitu is unusual in terms of morphology when compared to most other Oceanic languages spoken in Melanesia. It is one of very few Melanesian languages that have a passive voice-marking system.

=== Syntax ===
The usual word order of Vitu is subject–verb–object (SVO).
