= West New Britain Province =

Province in Papua New Guinea

West New Britain Province Wes Niu Briten Provins (Tok Pisin)
- Flag

- West New Britain Province in Papua New Guinea
- Coordinates: 5°50′S 150°0′E
- Country: Papua New Guinea
- Formation: 1976
- Capital: Kimbe
- Districts: List: Kandrian-Gloucester District; Talasea District

Government
  - Governor: Sasindran Muthuvel 2012-

Area
  - Total: 20,387 km^{2} (7,871 sq mi)

Population (2011 census)
  - Total: 264,264
  - Density: 12.962/km^{2} (33.572/sq mi)
- Time zone: UTC+10 (AEST)
- ISO 3166 code: PG-WBK
- HDI (2019): 0.592 medium · 6th of 22

West New Britain is a province of Papua New Guinea on the islands of New Britain. The provincial capital is Kimbe. The area of the province is 20,387 km^{2} with a population of 264,264 as of the 2011 census. The province's only land border is with East New Britain. There are seven major tribes, the Nakanai, Bakovi, Kove, Unea, Maleu, Arowe and Kaulong speaking about 25 languages.

People from West New Britain are referred to as "Kombes" in Papua New Guinea, in metonymic reference to the significant Kove (or Kombe) people. The Kove people were reported on by the anthropologist Ann Chowning in National Geographic magazine during the 1960s. Within Papua New Guinea they are noted for their practice of superincision of the penis—circumcision is generally though inaccurately referred to among Papua New Guineans as "the Kombe cut"—but was formerly practiced in other northern coastal regions of New Guinea island and the New Guinea Islands.

The predominant religious affiliation is Roman Catholic, though there is a sizeable Anglican presence at the extreme western tip of the province and Bishop James Ayong, the retired Anglican prelate of Papua New Guinea, is originally from West New Britain.

West New Britain produces palm oil for export with large oil palm plantations on the north coast of the province especially in the Kimbe region. There are logging activities in the interior and on the south coast. The Walindi dive resort near Kimbe is a tourist destination for visitors to Papua New Guinea.

== Districts and LLGs ==
There are two districts in the province. Each district has one or more Local Level Government (LLG) areas. For census purposes, the LLG areas are subdivided into wards and those into census units.

District	District Capital	LLG Name
Kandrian-Gloucester District	Kandrian	Gasmata Rural
Kandrian-Gloucester District	Kandrian	Gloucester Rural
Kandrian-Gloucester District	Kandrian	Kandrian Coastal Rural
Kandrian-Gloucester District	Kandrian	Kandrian Inland Rural
Kandrian-Gloucester District	Kandrian	Kove-Kaliai Rural
Talasea District	Kimbe	Bali-Witu Rural
Talasea District	Kimbe	Bialla Rural
Talasea District	Kimbe	Hoskins Rural
Talasea District	Kimbe	Kimbe Urban
Talasea District	Kimbe	Mosa Rural
Talasea District	Kimbe	Talasea Rural

== Provincial leaders ==
The province was governed by a decentralised provincial administration, headed by a Premier, from 1978 to 1995. Following reforms taking effect that year, the national government reassumed some powers, and the role of Premier was replaced by a position of Governor, to be held by the winner of the province-wide seat in the National Parliament of Papua New Guinea.

=== Premiers (1978–1995) ===
Premier	Term
Bernard Vogae	1978–1987
Joseph Lehen	1987–1988
Robert Lawrence	1988–1993
Bernard Vogae	1993–1995

=== Governors (1995–present) ===
Governor	Term
Lucas Waka	1995–1997
Bernard Vogae	1997–2000
Clement Nakmai	2000–2007
Peter Humphreys	2007–2012
Sasindran Muthuvel	2012–present

== Members of the National Parliament ==
The province and each district is represented by a Member of the National Parliament. There is one provincial electorate and each district is an open electorate.

Electorate	Member
West New Britain Provincial	Sasindran Muthuvel
Nakanai Open	Francis Maneke
Kandrian-Gloucester Open	Joseph Lelang
Talasea Open	Freddy R Kumai
