= Bisikani/Soparibeu Kabin Rural LLG =

Local-level government in Papua New Guinea

- Country: Papua New Guinea
- Province: Manus Province
- Time zone: UTC+10 (AEST)

Bisikani/Soparibeu Kabin Rural LLG is a local-level government (LLG) of Manus Province, Papua New Guinea.

== Wards ==
- 01. Salien
- 02. Nihon
- 03. Kali
- 04. Maso
- 05. Matahai
- 06. Salapai
- 07. Lessau
- 08. Harengau
- 09. Jowan 1
- 10. Jowan 2
- 11. Nyada
- 12. Levei
- 13. Sori 2
- 14. Sori 1
