= Mount Digine Rural LLG =

Local-level government in Papua New Guinea

- Location within Papua New Guinea
- Coordinates: 6.078576°S 144.918958°E
- Country: Papua New Guinea
- Province: Chimbu Province
- Time zone: UTC+10 (AEST)

Mount Digine Rural LLG is a local-level government (LLG) of Chimbu Province, Papua New Guinea.

== Wards ==
1. Gorma
2. Kel
3. Korokea
4. Digibe
5. Sipagul
6. Genabona
7. Kariglmaril
8. Gaima
9. Munuma
10. Oldale
11. Oldale 1
12. Oldale 2
