= Watom Island Rural LLG =

Local-level government in Papua New Guinea

- Country: Papua New Guinea
- Province: East New Britain Province
- Time zone: UTC+10 (AEST)

Watom Island Rural LLG is a local-level government (LLG) of East New Britain Province, Papua New Guinea.

== Wards ==
- 01. Rakival
- 02. Taranata
- 03. Valaur
- 04. Vunabuk
- 05. Vunakabai
- 06. Vunaulaiar
