= Lakekamu-Tauri Rural LLG =

Local-level government in Papua New Guinea

- Location within Papua New Guinea
- Coordinates: 8.069301°S 146.152467°E
- Country: Papua New Guinea
- Province: Gulf Province
- Time zone: UTC+10 (AEST)

Lakekamu-Tauri Rural LLG is a local-level government (LLG) of Gulf Province, Papua New Guinea.

== Wards ==
- 01. Ipihia/Titikaini
- 02. Wanto
- 03. Kakiva
- 04. Putei
- 05. Kakoro
- 06. Okaivai
- 07. Heavala
- 08. Heatoare
- 83. Malalaua Urban
