= Wapi/Yengis Rural LLG =

Local-level government in Papua New Guinea

- Location within Papua New Guinea
- Coordinates: 5.14°S 144.05°E
- Country: Papua New Guinea
- Province: Enga Province
- Time zone: UTC+10 (AEST)

Wapi/Yengis Rural LLG is a local-level government (LLG) of Enga Province, Papua New Guinea.

== Wards ==
- 01. Yengis
- 02. Saina
- 03. Kenailama
- 04. Mulale
- 05. Warabul
- 06. Pulukulama
- 07. Pumean
- 08. Kapumanda
- 09. Mengao
- 10. Mosop
- 11. Yambaitok
- 12. Kopaipalo
- 13. Olimoli
- 14. Elem
