= Kerema Urban LLG =

Local-level government in Papua New Guinea

- Location within Papua New Guinea
- Coordinates: 7.959642°S 145.773445°E
- Country: Papua New Guinea
- Province: Gulf Province
- Time zone: UTC+10 (AEST)

Kerema Urban LLG is a local-level government (LLG) of Gulf Province, Papua New Guinea.

== Wards ==
- 81. Kerema Town
