= East Kerema Rural LLG =

Local-level government in Papua New Guinea

- Country: Papua New Guinea
- Province: Gulf Province
- Time zone: UTC+10 (AEST)

East Kerema Rural LLG is a local-level government (LLG) of Gulf Province, Papua New Guinea.

== Wards ==
- 01. Lelefiru
- 02. Kukipi
- 03. Uritai
- 04. Popo
- 05. Lese
- 06. Miaru
- 07. Iokea
- 08. Oiapu
