= Dunantina Rural LLG =

Local-level government in Papua New Guinea

- Location within Papua New Guinea
- Coordinates: 6.11°S 145.69°E
- Country: Papua New Guinea
- Province: Eastern Highlands Province
- Time zone: UTC+10 (AEST)

District map of Eastern Highlands Province

Dunantina Rural LLG is a local-level government (LLG) of Eastern Highlands Province, Papua New Guinea.

== Wards ==
- 01. Lihona
- 02. Kuyahapa
- 03. Kesevaka(Zagafonave) No 2
- 04. Kesevaka No 1
- 05. Haguragave
- 06. Kiviringka
- 07. Herave
- 08. Kemenave
