= Niglkande Rural LLG =

Local-level government in Papua New Guinea

- Country: Papua New Guinea
- Province: Chimbu Province
- Time zone: UTC+10 (AEST)

Niglkande Rural LLG is a local-level government (LLG) of Chimbu Province, Papua New Guinea.

== Wards ==
1. Kewandeku/Mainagl
2. Girai Tamagle/Anga
3. Girai Tamagle
4. Nunuiomane 1
5. Nunuiomane 2
6. Kewandeku/Dugpag
7. Kengaglku/Kalaku 1
8. Kengaglku/Kalaku 2
9. Kombri 2
10. Gandenkoraglku
11. Koromba Barengigl
12. Kengaglku/Kruglku
13. Girai Tamage
