= Kapao Rural LLG =

Local-level government in Papua New Guinea

- Location within Papua New Guinea
- Coordinates: 7.413°S 146.338°E
- Country: Papua New Guinea
- Province: Morobe Province
- Time zone: UTC+10 (AEST)

Kapao Rural LLG is a local-level government (LLG) of Morobe Province, Papua New Guinea.

== Wards ==
- 01. Otete
- 02. Langamar
- 03. Angapena/Angewanga
- 04. Hiakwata
- 05. Komakwata
- 06. Kamiakaka
- 07. Okaneiwa
- 08. Yamaiya
- 09. Pasea
- 10. Angeweto
- 11. Aweaka
- 12. Mekini
- 13. Hiyewini
- 14. Pawamanga
- 15. Ainandoa
- 16. Mungo
- 17. Kalasu
