= Bomai/Gumai Rural LLG =

Local-level government in Papua New Guinea

Bomai/Gumai Rural LLG Bomai/Kumai Rural LLG
- Country: Papua New Guinea
- Province: Chimbu Province
- Time zone: UTC+10 (AEST)

Bomai/Gumai Rural LLG (also spelled Bomai/Kumai Rural LLG) is a local-level government (LLG) of Chimbu Province, Papua New Guinea.

== Wards ==
1. Era 1
2. Era 2
3. Era/Buli
4. Omdara
5. Kua
6. Dia
7. Kopan
8. Yuri
9. Deliku
10. Ainaku
11. Kawaleku
12. Nebiku
