= Upper Benna Rural LLG =

Local-level government in Papua New Guinea

- Country: Papua New Guinea
- Province: Eastern Highlands Province
- Time zone: UTC+10 (AEST)

District map of Eastern Highlands Province

Upper Benna Rural LLG is a local-level government (LLG) of Eastern Highlands Province, Papua New Guinea.

== Wards ==
- 01. Rintebe
- 02. Mipo Klopabo / Nayufa - Nipuvo
- 03. Yatgu-Safa Megunagu
- 04. Benevenabo / Segerehei
- 05. Kogaru Megabo
- 06. Kuritafa/Megabo No. 2
- 07. Liorofa
