= Kuare Rural LLG =

Local-level government in Papua New Guinea

- Location within Papua New Guinea
- Coordinates: 6.52°S 144.03°E
- Country: Papua New Guinea
- Province: [LAE MOROBE PROVINCE ]
- Time zone: UTC+10 (AEST)

Kuare Rural LLG is a local-level government (LLG) of Southern Highlands Province, Papua New Guinea.

== Wards ==
- 01. Epapini
- 02. Ita
- 03. Kalawida
- 04. Kaporoi
- 05. Karanda 1
- 06. Karanda 2
- 07. Karavere
- 08. Kilipini 1
- 09. Kola
- 10. Kuwi
- 11. Lapoko
- 12. Tindane/Kolopi
- 13. Tulupari
- 14. Agu Limba
- 15. Mapiro 1
- 16. Mapiro 2
- 17. Kupia
