= Nigoherm Rural LLG =

Local-level government in Papua New Guinea

- Country: Papua New Guinea
- Province: Manus Province
- Time zone: UTC+10 (AEST)

Nigoherm Rural LLG is a local-level government (LLG) of Manus Province, Papua New Guinea.

== Wards ==
- 01. Pateku
- 02. Lou Island
- 03. Pihon
- 04. Liot
- 05. Luf
- 06. Amik
