= Unavi Rural LLG =

Local-level government in Papua New Guinea

- Country: Papua New Guinea
- Province: Eastern Highlands Province
- Time zone: UTC+10 (AEST)

District map of Eastern Highlands Province

Unavi Rural LLG is a local-level government (LLG) of Eastern Highlands Province, Papua New Guinea.

== Wards ==
- 01. Megino No. 2
- 02. Maimafu
- 03. Giuasa
- 04. Mane No. 2
- 05. Maiva
- 06. Ubaigubi
- 07. Herowana
- 08. Agibu
- 09. Mane No. 1
