= Unggai Rural LLG =

Local-level government in Papua New Guinea

- Location within Papua New Guinea
- Coordinates: 6.19°S 145.33°E
- Country: Papua New Guinea
- Province: Eastern Highlands Province
- Time zone: UTC+10 (AEST)

District map of Eastern Highlands Province

Unggai Rural LLG is a local-level government (LLG) of Eastern Highlands Province, Papua New Guinea.

== Wards ==
- 01. Aligayufa
- 02. Yabiyufa
- 03. Wando
- 04. Orumba
- 05. Orumba-Foe
- 06. Yauna-Koko
