= Kove/Kaliai Rural LLG =

Local-level government in Papua New Guinea

- Country: Papua New Guinea
- Province: West New Britain Province
- Time zone: UTC+10 (AEST)

Kove/Kaliai Rural LLG is a local-level government (LLG) of West New Britain Province, Papua New Guinea. The Anêm language, a language isolate, is spoken in the LLG.

== Wards ==
- 01. Kadoka
- 02. Talasea
- 03. Poitala
- 04. Kalmaruhi
- 05. Sisili Sapulo
- 06. Mongamonga
- 07. Akivilik
- 08. Lusi
- 09. Anemsahe
- 10. Aria No. 1
- 11. Aria No. 2
- 12. Mouk
- 13. Lamogai
