= Ialibu Basin Rural LLG =

Local-level government in Papua New Guinea

- Location within Papua New Guinea
- Coordinates: 6.172°S 143.964°E
- Country: Papua New Guinea
- Province: Southern Highlands Province
- Time zone: UTC+10 (AEST)

Ialibu Basin Rural LLG is a local-level government (LLG) of Southern Highlands Province, Papua New Guinea.

== Wards ==
- 01. Kalipinie
- 02. Kou
- 03. Kero 1
- 04. Kero 2
- 05. Poneglama
- 06. Kongibugl 1
- 07. Kongibugl 2
- 08. Bimbene 1
- 09. Bibine 2
- 10. Kapoglpopilie
- 11. Yombi 1
- 12. Yawalangil 1
- 13. Topel/Kopri
- 14. Lepera
- 15. Pakulge
- 16. Yawalangil 2
- 18. Kendal 1
- 20. Iombi 2
- 21. Kalano
- 22. Maral
