= Mount Bosavi Rural LLG =

Local-level government in Papua New Guinea

- Location within Papua New Guinea
- Coordinates: 6.429555°S 142.839975°E
- Country: Papua New Guinea
- Province: Southern Highlands Province
- Time zone: UTC+10 (AEST)

Mount Bosavi Rural LLG is a local-level government (LLG) of Southern Highlands Province, Papua New Guinea.

== Wards ==
- 01. Ludesa
- 02. Bona
- 03. Waragu
- 04. Bobole
- 05. Filisado
- 06. Dodomona
- 07. Banisa
- 08. Wanagesa
- 09. Fogomayu
- 10. Musula
- 11. Lake Campbell
- 12. Gunigamo
- 13. Igiribisado
