= Kombiu Rural LLG =

Local-level government in Papua New Guinea

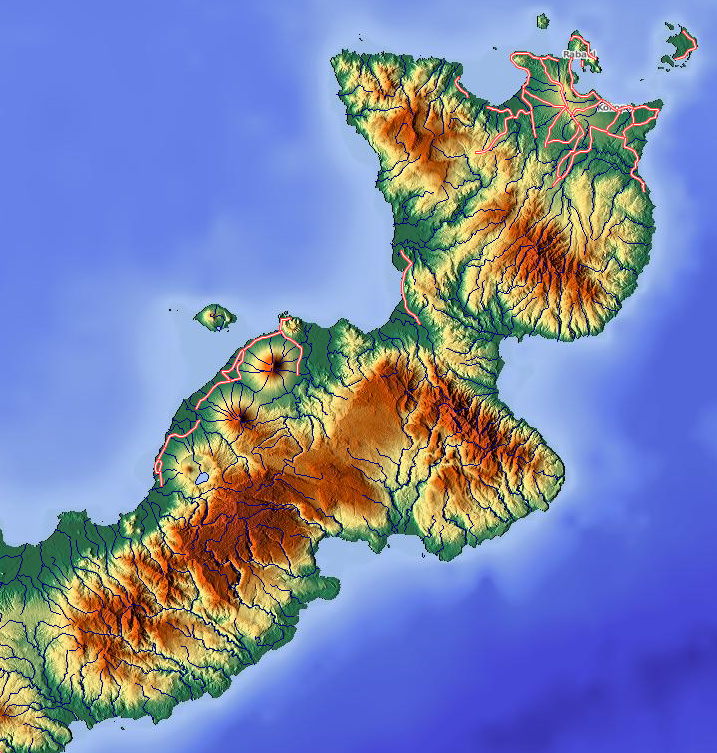
- Location within Papua New Guinea
- Coordinates: 4.174934°S 152.198858°E
- Country: Papua New Guinea
- Province: East New Britain Province
- Time zone: UTC+10 (AEST)

Kombiu Rural LLG is a local-level government (LLG) of East New Britain Province, Papua New Guinea.

== Wards ==
- 01. Baai
- 02. Nodup
- 03. Matalau
- 04. Rakunat
- 05. Rabuana
- 06. Korere 1
- 07. Korere 2
- 08. Talvat
- 09. Matupit 1
- 10. Matupit 2
- 11. Matupit 3
- 12. Matupit 4
- 13. Matupit 5
