= Tagali Rural LLG =

Local-level government in Papua New Guinea

- Country: Papua New Guinea
- Province: Hela Province
- Time zone: UTC+10 (AEST)

Tagali Rural LLG a local-level government (LLG) of Koroba-Kopiago District in Hela Province, Papua New Guinea.

== Wards ==
- 01. Halongali
- 02. Hava
- 03. Ula
- 04. Peta-Porogorali
- 05. Munima
- 06. Karita 1
- 07. Karita 2
- 08. Henganda 1
- 09. Henganda 2
- 10. Mbuli
- 11. Eganda
- 12. Kongiabi
- 13. Kayakali
- 14. Paijaka 1
- 15. Paijaka 2
- 16. Hariba
- 17. Tulupu Manopi
- 18. Pii Nakia
- 19. Mt. Kare 1
- 20. Mt. Kare 2
