= Mitnande Rural LLG =

Local-level government in Papua New Guinea

- Country: Papua New Guinea
- Province: Chimbu Province
- Time zone: UTC+10 (AEST)

Mitnande Rural LLG (formerly Mount Wilhelm Rural LLG) is a local-level government (LLG) of Chimbu Province, Papua New Guinea.

== Wards ==
1. Maglau/Wandigle
2. Maglau/Komkane 1
3. Maglau/Komkane 2
4. Maglau/Deglaku 1
5. Maglau
6. Maglau/Denglaku 2
7. Inaugl 1
8. Inaugl 2
9. Inaugl 3
10. Inaugl/Kunaiku
11. Inaugl 4
12. Kuglkane 1
13. Kuglkane 2
14. Kuglkane 3
15. Kuglkane 4
16. Kuglkane 5
17. Kuglkane 6
