= Lae Urban LLG =

Local-level government in Papua New Guinea

Lae Urban Rural LLG
- Country: Papua New Guinea
- Province: Morobe Province
- Time zone: UTC+10 (AEST)

Lae Urban LLG is a local-level government (LLG) of Morobe Province, Papua New Guinea.

== See also ==
- Suburbs of Lae
