= Gasmata Rural LLG =

Local-level government in Papua New Guinea

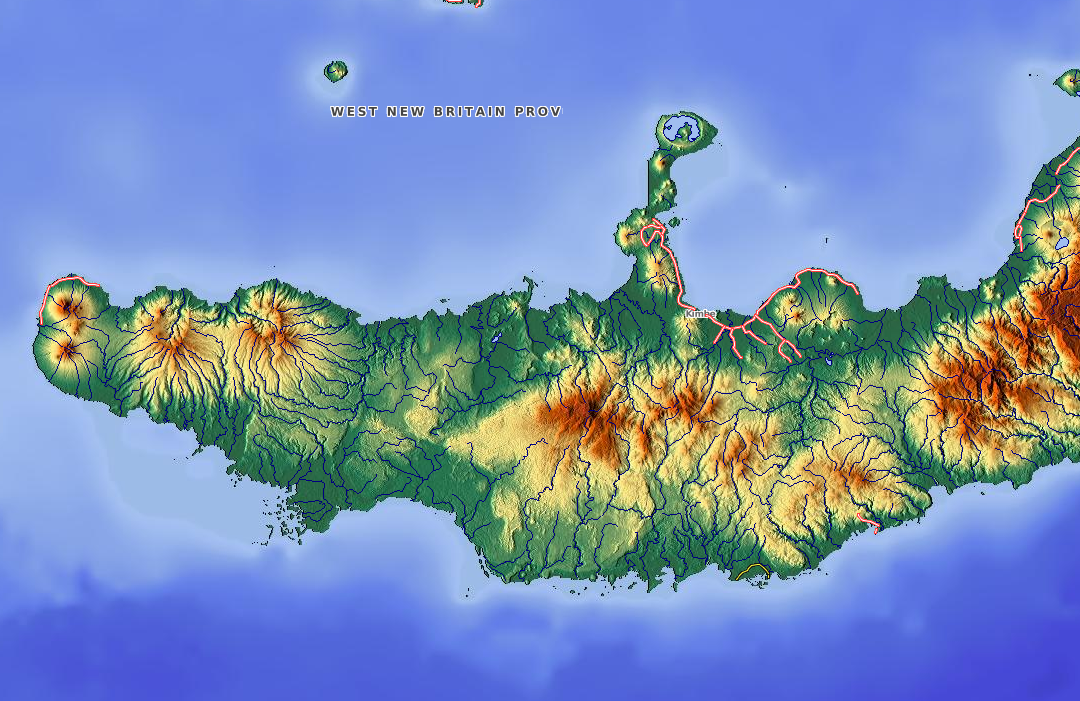
- Location within Papua New Guinea
- Coordinates: 6.27378°S 150.331°E
- Country: Papua New Guinea
- Province: West New Britain Province
- Time zone: UTC+10 (AEST)

Gasmata Rural LLG is a local-level government (LLG) of West New Britain Province, Papua New Guinea.

== Wards ==
- 01. Amio
- 02. Poronga
- 03. Tesopol
- 04. Akolet
- 05. Aigon
- 06. Kasuilo
- 07. Asirim

== See also ==
- Gasmata
