= East Yangoru Rural LLG =

Local-level government in Papua New Guinea

Numbo LLG Afawia village
- Location within Papua New Guinea
- Coordinates: 3.65258°S 143.295919°E
- Country: Papua New Guinea
- Province: East Sepik Province
- Time zone: UTC+10 (AEST)

East Yangoru Rural LLG is a local-level government (LLG) of East Sepik Province, Papua New Guinea.

== Wards ==
- 01. Pachen/Karapia
- 02. Yangoru Station
- 03. Numboguon
- 04. Baimuru
- 05. Bukienduon
- 06. Marambanja
- 07. Sima
- 08. Howi/Wamaina
- 09. Kufar/Ambokon
- 10. Siniangu/Mombuk
- 11. Witupe1
- 12. Koro
- 13. Makambu
- 14. Kiniambu
- 15. Haripmo 1, 2, 3
- 16. Merohombi
- 17. Kwagwie
- 18. Hagama
- 19. Soli
- 20. Parimuru
- 21. Ambukanja
- 22. Kiarivu
- 23. Kworabri
- 24. Simbomie/Sengri
- 25. Yekimbolye 2
- 26. Kamanja
- 27. Witupe 2
