= Numbor Rural LLG =

Local-level government in Papua New Guinea

- Location within Papua New Guinea
- Coordinates: 3.684998°S 143.496344°E
- Country: Papua New Guinea
- Province: East Sepik Province
- Time zone: UTC+10 (AEST)

Numbor Rural LLG is a local-level government (LLG) of East Sepik Province, Papua New Guinea.

== Wards ==
- 01. Kininieng
- 02. Harua
- 03. Wamaiang
- 04. Sasenumbohu
- 05. Niakandohung
- 06. Neimu
- 07. Niahombi
- 08. Mushuagen
- 09. Waliemba
- 10. Numbohu
- 11. Avawia
- 12. Haumbuhe
- 13. Hanyak
- 14. Numindogum
- 15. Nangumarum
- 16. Tangori 1
- 17. Sasoya
- 18. Tangori 2
- 19. Pambanieng
- 20. Huaripmogum
- 21. Nungori
- 22. Para
- 23. Paparom
