= Kewabi Rural LLG =

Local-level government in Papua New Guinea

- Country: Papua New Guinea
- Province: Southern Highlands Province
- Time zone: UTC+10 (AEST)

Kewabi Rural LLG is a local-level government (LLG) of Southern Highlands Province, Papua New Guinea.

== Wards ==
- 01. Kepiki 1
- 02. Kepiki 2
- 03. Wangai
- 04. Yate
- 05. Muli 1
- 06. Muli 2
- 07. Paibo
- 08. Yarena
- 09. Pale
- 10. Mambi
- 11. Munku 1
- 12. Munku 2
- 13. Makura 1
- 14. Mugura 2
- 15. Kirene
- 16. Kumbeme 1
- 17. Kumbeme 2
- 18. Ponowi 1
- 19. Ponowi 2
- 20. Munkumapo
- 21. Paibo 2
- 22. Kirene 2
- 23. Wangai 2
- 24. Mambi 2
- 25. Yarena 2
- 26. Mungumapu 2
- 28. Pale 2
- 29. Ponowi 3
- 30. Kirene 3
- 31. Multi 3
- 32. Paware 3
- 33. Mugu 3
