= Yapsie Rural LLG =

Local-level government in Papua New Guinea

- Location within Papua New Guinea
- Coordinates: 4.627999°S 141.095757°E
- Country: Papua New Guinea
- Province: Sandaun Province
- Time zone: UTC+10 (AEST)

Yapsie Rural LLG is a local-level government (LLG) of Sandaun Province, Papua New Guinea. Mountain Ok languages are spoken in the LLG.

== Wards ==
- 01. Imnai 1
- 02. Imnai 2
- 03. Bitapena
- 04. Tumolbil
- 05. Ivikmin
- 06. Kemeimin
- 07. Urapmin
- 08. Sokonga
- 09. Bakading
- 10. Fungal
- 11. Bilka
- 12. Bokembil
- 13. Wauru
- 14. Defakbil
- 15. Mututeimin
- 16. Umfokmin
- 17. Atensikin
- 18. Mongapbip
- 19. Fiamok
- 20. Busulmin
