= Sausso Rural LLG =

Local-level government in Papua New Guinea

- Location within Papua New Guinea
- Coordinates: 3.784039°S 143.45992°E
- Country: Papua New Guinea
- Province: East Sepik Province
- Time zone: UTC+10 (AEST)

Sausso Rural LLG is a local-level government (LLG) of East Sepik Province, Papua New Guinea.

== Wards ==
- 01. Urigembi
- 02. Japaraka
- 03. Yari/Nungawa
- 04. Wiomungu
- 05. Tuonumbu
- 06. Munji
- 07. Suadogum
- 08. Rofundogum
- 09. Bima
- 10. Timunangua
- 11. Werman
- 12. Bararat
- 13. Peringa
- 14. Wambe
- 15. Rabiawa (sic Rofuyawa)
- 16. Kambaraka Kowiru
- 17. Wamagu
- 18. Japaraka 1
- 19. Porombe
- 20. Segero
- 21. Kusaun
- 22. Mindogum
