= Lai Valley Rural LLG =

Local-level government in Papua New Guinea

Lai Valley @ Kulia 741 Rural LLG Kulia 741.
- Location within Papua New Guinea
- Coordinates: 6.073456°S 143.541847°E
- Country: Papua New Guinea
- Province: Southern Highlands Province
- Time zone: UTC+10 (AEST)

Lai Valley Rural LLG - Kulia 741 is a local-level government (LLG) of Southern Highlands Province, Papua New Guinea.

== Wards ==
- 01. Topa
- 02. Komp
- 03. Tugup 1
- 04. Kip 1
- 05. Kip 2
- 06. Tumia
- 07. Munihu Station
- 08. Maip 1
- 09. Kuianda
- 10. Soba 1
- 11. Soba 2
- 12. Nol
- 13. Injet
- 14. Tubip 2
- 15. Kema
- 16. Nengia
- 17. Imilhoma
- 18. Wariba
- 19. Marara
- 20. Sol
- 21. Honda
- 22. Monta
- 23. Maip 2
- 24. Soba
- 25. Mariste
- 26. Waip
- 27. Angoma Mariste
- 28. Sombol
- 29. Pendia
