= Weraura Rural LLG =

Local-level government in Papua New Guinea

- Country: Papua New Guinea
- Province: Milne Bay Province
- Time zone: UTC+10 (AEST)

Weraura Rural LLG is a local-level government (LLG) of Milne Bay Province, Papua New Guinea.

== Wards ==
- 01. Divari
- 02. Kwabunaki
- 03. Rumaruma
- 04. Damayadona
- 05. Wedau
- 06. Manubada
- 07. Vidia
- 08. Radava
- 09. Gadoa
- 10. Wadobuna
- 11. Nakara
- 12. Uga
- 13. Augwana
- 14. Sirisiri
- 15. Taramugu
- 16. Ikara
- 17. Taubadi
- 18. Bidiesi
- 19. Awawa
- 20. Dombosaina
- 21. Warawadidi
- 22. Bowadi
- 23. Danobu
- 24. Karagautu
- 25. Wanama
- 26. Boiaboia
- 27. Gadovisu
- 28. Didia
- 29. Mainawa
- 30. Pova
