= Yamil/Tamaui Rural LLG =

Local-level government in Papua New Guinea

- Location within Papua New Guinea
- Coordinates: 3.74431°S 143.128431°E
- Country: Papua New Guinea
- Province: East Sepik Province
- Time zone: UTC+10 (AEST)

Yamil/Tamaui Rural LLG is a local-level government (LLG) of East Sepik Province, Papua New Guinea.

== Wards ==
- 01. Kombikum
- 02. Gwarip
- 03. Bengrakum
- 04. Yaunjange
- 05. Suambukum
- 06. Kwimbu 1
- 07. Malba 1
- 08. Ulupu
- 09. Yalahine
- 10. Yamil 1
- 11. Waikakum 1
- 12. Waikakum 3
- 13. Saikisi 1
- 14. Dumbit 2
- 14.Dumbit 1
- 15. Yenigo
- 16. Mendiamin
