= Melkoi Rural LLG =

Local-level government in Papua New Guinea

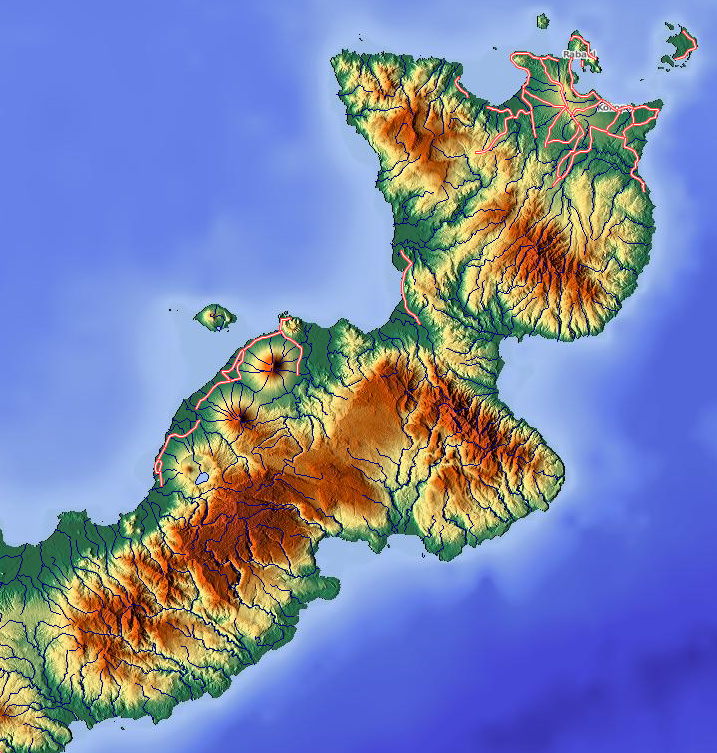
- Location within Papua New Guinea
- Coordinates: 5.99996°S 150.983585°E
- Country: Papua New Guinea
- Province: East New Britain Province
- Time zone: UTC+10 (AEST)

Melkoi Rural LLG is a local-level government (LLG) of East New Britain Province, Papua New Guinea.

== Wards ==
- 01. Makmak
- 02. Waipo
- 03. Simi
- 04. Tavolo
- 05. Meletong
- 06. Uvol
- 07. Einahelei
- 08. Ruachana
- 09. Mininga
- 10. Maso
- 11. Esletenae
- 12. Mainge
- 13. Atu
- 14. Haumakia
- 15. Poio
- 16. Pilematana
- 17. Lausus
- 18. Kenmininga
- 19. Warale
