= South Wosera Rural LLG =

Local-level government in Papua New Guinea

- Location within Papua New Guinea
- Coordinates: 3.787186°S 143.005159°E
- Country: Papua New Guinea
- Province: East Sepik Province
- Time zone: UTC+10 (AEST)

South Wosera Rural LLG is a local-level government (LLG) of East Sepik Province, Papua New Guinea.

== Wards ==
- 01. Jikinangu
- 02. Tiendikum
- 03. Miko 1
- 04. Konambandu
- 05. Konambandu 3
- 06. Tukwokum
- 07. Apisit/Gunigi
- 08. Nala
- 09. Kunjingini
- 10. Mul
- 11. Waikamoko
- 12. Rubukum
- 13. Gwaiwaru
- 14. Moundu
- 15. Kamge
- 16. Patigo
- 17. Serangwandu
- 18. Palgerr
- 19. Nangda
- 20. Mikau
- 21. Wambisa
- 22. Kuanjoma
- 23. Pukago
- 24. Jipmako
- 25. Nungwaiko
- 26. Kwalget
- 27. Apambi
- 28. Gupmapil
