= Awi/Pori Rural LLG =

Local-level government in Papua New Guinea

- Location within Papua New Guinea
- Coordinates: 5.492475°S 142.615669°E
- Country: Papua New Guinea
- Province: Hela Province
- Time zone: UTC+10 (AEST)

Awi/Pori Rural LLG a local-level government (LLG) of Koroba-Kopiago District in Hela Province, Papua New Guinea.

== Wards ==
- 01. Ti'iba
- 02. Tapayamapu
- 03. Kuranda 2
- 04. Kuranda 1
- 05. Tade 2 (Wagia)
- 06. Tade 1
- 07. Wagala
- 08. Eganda
- 09. Ayuguali 1
- 10. Ayugali 2
- 11. Wanga Pareya
- 12. Tugu
- 13. Hamuta
- 14. Puyena
- 15. Kewe 1
- 16. Kewe 2
- 17. Embe
- 18. Wanga
- 19. Paga
- 20. Hawinda 1
- 21. Hirubala
- 22. Hawinda 2
- 23. Kutage
- 24. Waluni/Tarane
- 25. Hirutege
