= North Wosera Rural LLG =

Local-level government in Papua New Guinea

- Location within Papua New Guinea
- Coordinates: 3.736954°S 142.97977°E
- Country: Papua New Guinea
- Province: East Sepik Province
- Time zone: UTC+10 (AEST)

North Wosera Rural LLG is a local-level government (LLG) of East Sepik Province, Papua New Guinea.

== Wards ==
- 01. Kumunikum 1
- 02. Kumunikum 2
- 03. Kumunikum 3
- 04. Tatemba
- 05. Babandu
- 06. Wisukum
- 07. Numamaka
- 08. Stapikum
- 09. Talengi
- 10. Kitikum
- 11. Numbingei
- 13. Gualakum
- 14. Kwatmukum
- 15. Sarikum
- 16. Bukibalikum
- 17. Jambitangit
- 18. Wapindumaka
- 19. Jipako
- 20. Manjikoruwi
- 21. Umunko
- 23. Jipakim
- 24. Ugutakua
- 25. Weiko
- 26. Dumek
- 27. Nungwaia
- 28. Kwanga
