= Kundiawa Urban LLG =

Local-level government in Papua New Guinea

- Location within Papua New Guinea
- Coordinates: 6.017312°S 144.974707°E
- Country: Papua New Guinea
- Province: Chimbu Province
- Time zone: UTC+10 (AEST)

Kundiawa Urban LLG is a local-level government (LLG) of Chimbu Province, Papua New Guinea.

== Wards ==
- 80. Kundiawa Urban
