= Mount Michael Rural LLG =

Local-level government in Papua New Guinea

- Country: Papua New Guinea
- Province: Eastern Highlands Province
- Time zone: UTC+10 (AEST)

District map of Eastern Highlands Province

Mount Michael Rural LLG is a local-level government (LLG) of Eastern Highlands Province, Papua New Guinea.

== Wards ==
- 01. Agotu
- 02. Hegeturu
- 03. Fiamotave
- 04. Megino No. 1
- 05. Gouno
- 06. Beha
- 07. Korowa
- 08. Lufa Station
- 09. Hairo
- 10. Menilo
- 11. Hagaulo
- 12. Kuruku
