= Lelemadih/Bupichupeu Rural LLG =

Local-level government in Papua New Guinea

- Country: Papua New Guinea
- Province: Manus Province
- Time zone: UTC+10 (AEST)

Lelemadih/Bupichupeu Rural LLG is a local-level government (LLG) of Manus Province, Papua New Guinea.

== Wards ==
- 01. Malapang
- 02. Horan
- 03. Powat
- 04. Maraman
- 05. Lapahan
- 06. N'Drakot
- 07. Lowa
- 08. Ahus
- 09. Yiringou
- 10. Bowat 1
- 11. Lundret
- 12. Rossum
- 13. Dungoumasih
- 14. Sapon 1
- 15. Warambei
- 16. Pityluh
- 17. N'drilou
- 18. N'Dranou
