= Huhu Rural LLG =

Local-level government in Papua New Guinea

- Location within Papua New Guinea
- Coordinates: 10.365°S 150.279°E
- Country: Papua New Guinea
- Province: Milne Bay Province
- Time zone: UTC+10 (AEST)

Huhu Rural LLG is a local-level government (LLG) of Milne Bay Province, Papua New Guinea.

== Wards ==
- 01. Mutu'uwa
- 02. Divinai
- 03. Daio
- 04. Rabe
- 05. Ianeianene
- 06. Siasiada
- 07. Gibara
- 08. Lamhaga
- 09. Lelehudi
- 10. Watunou
- 11. Nigila
- 12. Ahioma
- 13. Waema
- 14. Gabugabuna
- 15. Maiwara
- 16. Naura
- 17. Gelamalaia
- 18. Gamadoudou
- 19. Wagawaga
- 20. Gwavili
- 21. Upper Dawadawa
- 22. Bubuleta
- 23. Walalaia
- 24. Bou
- 25. Ipouli
- 26. Kilakilana
- 27. Borowai
- 28. Laviam
- 29. Lower Dawadawa
- 85. Hagita Estate
