= Tetidu Rural LLG =

Local-level government in Papua New Guinea

- Country: Papua New Guinea
- Province: Manus Province
- Time zone: UTC+10 (AEST)

Tetidu Rural LLG is a local-level government (LLG) of Manus Province, Papua New Guinea.

== Wards ==
- 01. Buyang
- 02. Kawaliap
- 03. Tingou
- 04. Londru
- 05. Pitariat
- 06. Tawi
