= Gawanga Rural LLG =

Local-level government in Papua New Guinea

- Location within Papua New Guinea
- Coordinates: 3.778759°S 142.734366°E
- Country: Papua New Guinea
- Province: East Sepik Province
- Time zone: UTC+10 (AEST)

Gawanga Rural LLG is a local-level government (LLG) of East Sepik Province, Papua New Guinea. The Kwanga language is spoken in this LLG.

== Wards ==
- 01. Apangai
- 02. Yambanakor 1
- 03. Yambinakor 2
- 04. Asanakor
- 05. Inakor
- 06. Apos
- 07. Daina
- 08. Masalagar
- 09. Wasambu
- 10. Bongomasi
- 11. Wahaukia
- 12. Bongos
- 13. Kuyor
- 14. Kuatengisi
- 15. Mamsi
- 16. Kubriwat 1
- 17. Kubriwat 2
- 18. Tau 1
- 19. Tau 2
- 20. Wamenokor
- 21. Sauke Aucheli
- 22. Surumburombo
