= Aiya Rural LLG =

Local-level government in Papua New Guinea

- Location within Papua New Guinea
- Coordinates: 6.34°S 143.72°E
- Country: Papua New Guinea
- Province: Southern Highlands Province
- Time zone: UTC+10 (AEST)

Aiya Rural LLG is a local-level government (LLG) of Southern Highlands Province, Papua New Guinea.

== Wards ==
- 25. Aboba
- 26. Lameriga
- 27. Lapi
- 28. Bata
- 29. Maipata
- 30. Pira
- 31. Raguare
- 32. Roalamanda
- 33. Sumi
- 34. Uma
- 35. Usa
- 36. Yanguri 1
- 37. Yanguri 2
- 38. Akuna
- 39. Lagiri-Baita
- 40. Pawayamo
- 41. Puti
- 42. Wasa
- 43. Wasuma
- 44. Kengawe
- 45. Ripu/Maguta
- 46. Sugu
- 47. Sare
