= Mumeng Rural LLG =

Local-level government in Papua New Guinea

- Location within Papua New Guinea
- Coordinates: 6.979244°S 146.61902°E
- Country: Papua New Guinea
- Province: Morobe Province
- Time zone: UTC+10 (AEST)

Mumeng Rural LLG is a local-level government (LLG) of Morobe Province, Papua New Guinea.

== Wards ==
- 10. Timini
- 11. Hengambu/Towangola
- 12. Gurakor
- 13. Patep
- 14. Parakris
- 15. Yanta
- 16. Zenag
- 17. Kumalu
- 18. Sambio
- 19. Latukatop
- 20. Baiyune
- 21. Galawo
- 22. Dambi
- 23. Mumeng Station
- 24. Witipos
- 25. Kapin
- 26. Tayek
- 27. Bupu
- 28. Piu
- 29. Dangal
