= Local-level governments of Papua New Guinea =

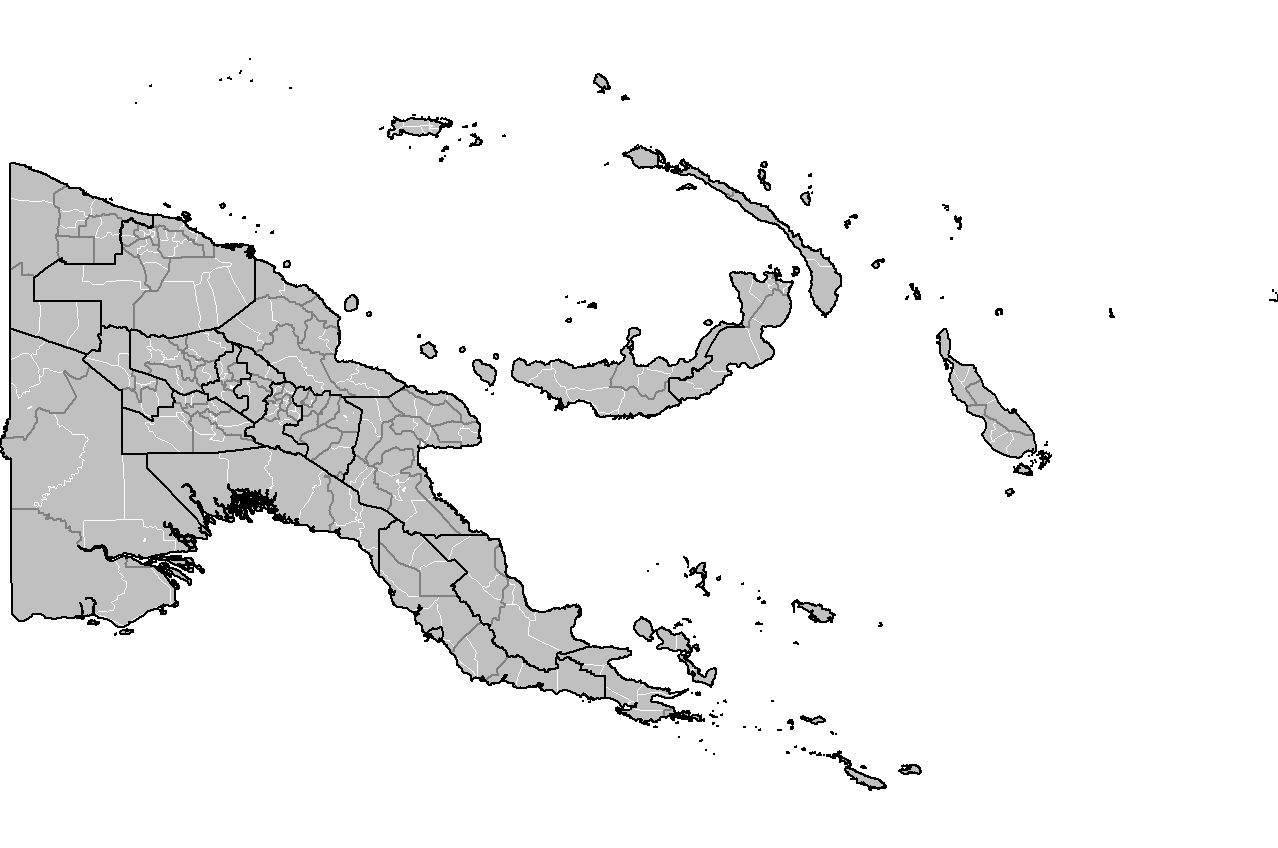
Districts and LLGs of Papua New Guinea

Papua New Guinea has 326 local-level governments (LLGs) comprising 6,112 wards as of 2018.

== Administrative divisions ==
At the highest level, Papua New Guinea is divided into four regions, namely the Highlands, Islands, Momase, and Southern regions.

Below, Papua New Guinea has 22 province-level divisions: 20 integrated provinces, the Autonomous Region of Bougainville and the National Capital District.

Each province has one or more districts, and each district has one or more local-level government (LLG) areas. For census purposes, the LLG areas are subdivided into wards consisting of a few hundred to a few thousand individuals. Wards are further divided into census units (CU).

== List of local-level governments by region and province ==
=== Highlands Region ===
==== Chimbu Province ====
District	District Capital	LLG Name
Chuave District	Chuave	Chuave Rural
Chuave District	Chuave	Elimbari Rural
Chuave District	Chuave	Siane Rural
Gumine District	Gumine	Bomai/Gumai Rural
Gumine District	Gumine	Gumine Rural
Gumine District	Gumine	Mount Digine Rural
Karimui-Nomane District	Karimui	Karimui Rural
Karimui-Nomane District	Karimui	Nomane Rural
Karimui-Nomane District	Karimui	Salt Rural
Kerowagi District	Kerowagi	Gena/Waugla Rural
Kerowagi District	Kerowagi	Upper/Lower Koronigl Rural
Kerowagi District	Kerowagi	Kerowagi Urban
Kerowagi District	Kerowagi	Kup Rural
Kundiawa-Gembogl District	Kundiawa	Kundiawa Urban
Kundiawa-Gembogl District	Kundiawa	Mitnande Rural (Mount Wilhelm Rural)
Kundiawa-Gembogl District	Kundiawa	Niglkande Rural
Kundiawa-Gembogl District	Kundiawa	Waiye Rural
Sina Sina-Yonggomugl District	Yonggomugl	Tabare Rural (Sinasina)
Sina Sina-Yonggomugl District	Yonggomugl	Suai Rural (Suwai)
Sina Sina-Yonggomugl District	Yonggomugl	Yonggomugl Rural

==== Eastern Highlands Province ====
District map of Eastern Highlands Province

District	District Capital	LLG Name
Daulo District	Asaro	Watabung Rural
Daulo District	Asaro	Lower Asaro Rural
Daulo District	Asaro	Upper Asaro Rural
Goroka District	Goroka	Gahuku Rural
Goroka District	Goroka	Goroka Urban
Goroka District	Goroka	Mimanalo Rural
Henganofi District	Henganofi	Kafentina Rural
Henganofi District	Henganofi	Dunantina Rural
Henganofi District	Henganofi	Fayantina Rural
Kainantu District	Kainantu	Kainantu Urban
Kainantu District	Kainantu	Kamano 1 Rural
Kainantu District	Kainantu	Kamano 2 Rural
Kainantu District	Kainantu	Agarabi Rural
Lufa District	Lufa	Yagaria Rural
Lufa District	Lufa	Mount Michael Rural
Lufa District	Lufa	Unavi Rural
Obura-Wonenara District	Lamari	Gadsup/Tairora Rural
Obura-Wonenara District	Lamari	Lamari Rural
Obura-Wonenara District	Lamari	Yelia Rural
Okapa District	Okapa	East Okapa Rural
Okapa District	Okapa	West Okapa Rural
Unggai-Benna District	Benna	Lower Benna Rural
Unggai-Benna District	Benna	Upper Benna Rural
Unggai-Benna District	Benna	Unggai Rural

==== Enga Province ====
District	District Capital	LLG Name
Kandep District	Kandep	Kandep Rural
Kandep District	Kandep	Wage Rural
Kompiam District	Kompiam	Ambum Rural
Kompiam District	Kompiam	Kompiam Rural
Kompiam District	Kompiam	Wapi/Yengis Rural
Lagaip-Porgera District	Lagaip-Porgera	Lagaip Rural
Lagaip-Porgera District	Lagaip-Porgera	Maip Muritaka Rural
Lagaip-Porgera District	Lagaip-Porgera	Paiela/Hewa Rural
Lagaip-Porgera District	Lagaip-Porgera	Pilikambi Rural
Lagaip-Porgera District	Lagaip-Porgera	Porgera Rural
Wapenamanda District	Wapenamanda	Wapenamanda Rural
Wapenamanda District	Wapenamanda	Tsak Rural
Wabag District	Wabag	Maramuni Rural
Wabag District	Wabag	Wabag Rural
Wabag District	Wabag	Wabag Urban

==== Southern Highlands Province ====
District	District Capital	LLG Name
Ialibu-Pangia District	Ialibu	East Pangia Rural
Ialibu-Pangia District	Ialibu	Ialibu Urban
Ialibu-Pangia District	Ialibu	Kewabi Rural
Ialibu-Pangia District	Ialibu	Wiru Rural
Imbonggu District	Imbonggu	Ialibu Basin Rural
Imbonggu District	Imbonggu	Imbonggu Rural
Imbonggu District	Imbonggu	Lower Mendi Rural
Kagua-Erave District	Kagua	Erave Rural
Kagua-Erave District	Kagua	Kagua Rural
Kagua-Erave District	Kagua	Kuare Rural
Kagua-Erave District	Kagua	Aiya Rural
Mendi-Munihu District	Mendi	Karints Rural
Mendi-Munihu District	Mendi	Lai Valley Rural
Mendi-Munihu District	Mendi	Mendi Urban
Mendi-Munihu District	Mendi	Upper Mendi Rural
Nipa-Kutubu District	Nipa	Lake Kutubu Rural
Nipa-Kutubu District	Nipa	Mount Bosavi Rural
Nipa-Kutubu District	Nipa	Nembi Plateau Rural
Nipa-Kutubu District	Nipa	Nipa Rural
Nipa-Kutubu District	Nipa	Poroma Rural

==== Western Highlands Province ====
District	District Capital	LLG Name
Dei District	Dei	Dei Rural (Muglamp)
Dei District	Dei	Kotna Rural
Mount Hagen District	Mount Hagen	Mount Hagen Rural
Mount Hagen District	Mount Hagen	Mount Hagen Urban
Mul-Baiyer District	Baiyer	Baiyer Rural
Mul-Baiyer District	Baiyer	Lumusa Rural
Mul-Baiyer District	Baiyer	Mul Rural
Tambul-Nebilyer District	Tambul	Mount Giluwe Rural
Tambul-Nebilyer District	Tambul	Nebilyer Rural

==== Hela Province ====
District	District Capital	LLG Name
Komo-Magarima District	Magarima	Hulia Rural
Komo-Magarima District	Magarima	Komo Rural
Komo-Magarima District	Magarima	Upper Wage Rural
Komo-Magarima District	Magarima	Lower Wage Rural
Koroba-Kopiago District	Kopiago	Lake Kopiago Rural
Koroba-Kopiago District	Kopiago	North Koroba Rural
Koroba-Kopiago District	Kopiago	South Koroba Rural
Tari-Pori District	Tari	Hayapuga Rural
Tari-Pori District	Tari	Tagali Rural
Tari-Pori District	Tari	Tari Urban
Tari-Pori District	Tari	Tebi Rural
Tari-Pori District	Tari	Awi/Pori Rural

==== Jiwaka Province ====
District	District Capital	LLG Name
Anglimp-South Waghi District	Kurumul	Anglimp Rural
Anglimp-South Waghi District	Kurumul	South Waghi Rural
Jimi District	Tabibuga	Jimi Rural
Jimi District	Tabibuga	Kol Rural
North Waghi District	Banz	North Waghi Rural
North Waghi District	Banz	Nondugl Rural

=== Islands Region ===
==== East New Britain Province ====
District	District Capital	LLG Name
Gazelle District	Kerevat	Central Gazelle Rural
Gazelle District	Kerevat	Inland Baining Rural
Gazelle District	Kerevat	Lassul Baining Rural
Gazelle District	Kerevat	Livuan/Reimber Rural
Gazelle District	Kerevat	Vunadidir/Toma Rural
Kokopo District	Kokopo	Bitapaka Rural
Kokopo District	Kokopo	Duke of York Rural
Kokopo District	Kokopo	Kokopo/Vunamami Urban
Kokopo District	Kokopo	Raluana Rural
Pomio District	Pomio	Central/Inland Pomio Rural
Pomio District	Pomio	East Pomio Rural
Pomio District	Pomio	Melkoi Rural
Pomio District	Pomio	Sinivit Rural
Pomio District	Pomio	West Pomio/Mamusi Rural
Rabaul District	Rabaul	Balanataman Rural
Rabaul District	Rabaul	Kombiu Rural
Rabaul District	Rabaul	Rabaul Urban
Rabaul District	Rabaul	Watom Island Rural

==== Manus Province ====
District	District Capital	LLG Name
Manus District	Lorengau	Aua Wuvulu Rural
Manus District	Lorengau	Balopa Rural
Manus District	Lorengau	Bisikani/Soparibeu Kabin Rural
Manus District	Lorengau	Lelemadih/Bupichupeu Rural
Manus District	Lorengau	Lorengau Urban
Manus District	Lorengau	Los Negros Rural
Manus District	Lorengau	Nali Sopat/Penabu Rural
Manus District	Lorengau	Nigoherm Rural
Manus District	Lorengau	Pobuma Rural
Manus District	Lorengau	Pomutu/Kurti/Andra Rural
Manus District	Lorengau	Rapatona Rural
Manus District	Lorengau	Tetidu Rural

==== New Ireland Province ====
District map of New Ireland Province

District	District Capital	LLG Name
Kavieng District	Kavieng	Kavieng Urban
Kavieng District	Kavieng	Lovongai Rural
Kavieng District	Kavieng	Murat Rural
Kavieng District	Kavieng	Tikana Rural
Namatanai District	Namatanai	Konoagil Rural
Namatanai District	Namatanai	Namatanai Rural
Namatanai District	Namatanai	Matalai Rural
Namatanai District	Namatanai	Nimamar Rural
Namatanai District	Namatanai	Sentral Niu Ailan Rural
Namatanai District	Namatanai	Tanir Rural

==== West New Britain Province ====
District	District Capital	LLG Name
Kandrian-Gloucester District	Kandrian	Gasmata Rural
Kandrian-Gloucester District	Kandrian	Gloucester Rural
Kandrian-Gloucester District	Kandrian	Kandrian Coastal Rural
Kandrian-Gloucester District	Kandrian	Kandrian Inland Rural
Kandrian-Gloucester District	Kandrian	Kove/Kaliai Rural
Talasea District	Kimbe	Bali/Witu Rural
Talasea District	Kimbe	Bialla Rural
Talasea District	Kimbe	Hoskins Rural
Talasea District	Kimbe	Kimbe Urban
Talasea District	Kimbe	Mosa Rural
Talasea District	Kimbe	Talasea Rural

==== Autonomous Region of Bougainville ====
District map of Autonomous Region of Bougainville (formerly North Solomons Province)

District	District Capital	LLG Name
Central Bougainville District	Arawa-Kieta	Arawa Rural
Central Bougainville District	Arawa-Kieta	Wakunai Rural
North Bougainville District	Buka	Atolls Rural
North Bougainville District	Buka	Buka Rural
North Bougainville District	Buka	Kunua Rural
North Bougainville District	Buka	Nissan Rural
North Bougainville District	Buka	Selau/Suir Rural
North Bougainville District	Buka	Tinputz Rural
South Bougainville District	Buin	Bana Rural
South Bougainville District	Buin	Buin Rural
South Bougainville District	Buin	Siwai Rural
South Bougainville District	Buin	Torokina Rural

=== Momase Region ===
==== East Sepik Province ====
District	District Capital	LLG Name
Ambunti-Dreikikier District	Ambunti	Ambunti Rural
Ambunti-Dreikikier District	Ambunti	Tunap/Hunstein Rural
Ambunti-Dreikikier District	Ambunti	Gawanga Rural
Ambunti-Dreikikier District	Ambunti	Dreikikier Rural
Angoram District	Angoram	Angoram/Middle Sepik Rural
Angoram District	Angoram	Keram Rural
Angoram District	Angoram	Karawari Rural
Angoram District	Angoram	Marienberg Rural (Marienberg/Lower Sepik)
Angoram District	Angoram	Yuat Rural
Maprik District	Maprik	Albiges/Mablep Rural
Maprik District	Maprik	Bumbita/Muhian Rural
Maprik District	Maprik	Maprik/Wora Rural
Maprik District	Maprik	Yamil/Tamaui Rural
Wewak District	Wewak	Boikin/Dagua Rural
Wewak District	Wewak	Turubu Rural
Wewak District	Wewak	Wewak Islands Rural
Wewak District	Wewak	Wewak Rural
Wewak District	Wewak	Wewak Urban
Wosera-Gawi District	Wosera	Burui/Kunai Rural
Wosera-Gawi District	Wosera	Gawi Rural
Wosera-Gawi District	Wosera	North Wosera Rural
Wosera-Gawi District	Wosera	South Wosera Rural
Yangoru-Saussia District	Yangoru	East Yangoru Rural
Yangoru-Saussia District	Yangoru	Numbor Rural
Yangoru-Saussia District	Yangoru	Sausso Rural
Yangoru-Saussia District	Yangoru	West Yangoru Rural

==== Madang Province ====
District	District Capital	LLG Name
Bogia District	Bogia	Almami Rural
Bogia District	Bogia	Iabu Rural
Bogia District	Bogia	Yawar Rural
Madang District	Madang	Ambenob Rural
Madang District	Madang	Madang Urban
Madang District	Madang	Transgogol Rural
Middle Ramu District	Simbai	Arabaka Rural
Middle Ramu District	Simbai	Josephstaal Rural
Middle Ramu District	Simbai	Simbai Rural
Middle Ramu District	Simbai	Kovon Rural
Rai Coast District	Saidor	Astrolabe Bay Rural
Rai Coast District	Saidor	Naho Rawa Rural
Rai Coast District	Saidor	Nayudo Rural
Rai Coast District	Saidor	Rai Coast (Saidor)
Sumkar District	Karkar	Karkar Rural
Sumkar District	Karkar	Sumgilbar Rural
Usino Bundi District	Usino	Bundi Rural
Usino Bundi District	Usino	Usino Rural
Usino Bundi District	Usino	Gama Rural

==== Morobe Province ====
District	District Capital	LLG Name
Bulolo District	Bulolo	Mumeng Rural
Bulolo District	Bulolo	Waria Rural
Bulolo District	Bulolo	Watut Rural
Bulolo District	Bulolo	Wau/Bulolo Urban
Bulolo District	Bulolo	Wau Rural
Bulolo District	Bulolo	Buang Rural
Finschhafen District	Gagidu	Hube Rural
Finschhafen District	Gagidu	Kotte Rural
Finschhafen District	Gagidu	Finschhafen Urban
Finschhafen District	Gagidu	Yabim Mape Rural
Finschhafen District	Gagidu	Burum Kwat Rural
Huon District	Salamaua	Morobe Rural
Huon District	Salamaua	Salamaua Rural
Huon District	Salamaua	Wampar Rural
Kabwum District	Kabwum	Deyamos Rural
Kabwum District	Kabwum	Komba Rural (Seko)
Kabwum District	Kabwum	Yus Rural
Kabwum District	Kabwum	Selepet Rural
Lae District	Lae	Ahi Rural
Lae District	Lae	Lae Urban
Markham District	Kaiapit	Onga/Waffa Rural
Markham District	Kaiapit	Umi/Atzera Rural
Markham District	Kaiapit	Wantoat/Leron Rural
Menyamya District	Menyamya	Kapao Rural
Menyamya District	Menyamya	Nanima Kariba Rural
Menyamya District	Menyamya	Kome Rural
Menyamya District	Menyamya	Wapi Rural
Nawae District	Boana	Labuta Rural
Nawae District	Boana	Nabak Rural
Nawae District	Boana	Wain-Erap Rural
Tawae-Siassi District	Wasu	Sialum Rural
Tawae-Siassi District	Wasu	Siassi Rural
Tawae-Siassi District	Wasu	Wasu Rural

==== Sandaun (West Sepik) Province ====
District	District Capital	LLG Name
Aitape-Lumi District	Aitape	East Aitape Rural
Aitape-Lumi District	Aitape	East Wapei Rural
Aitape-Lumi District	Aitape	West Aitape Rural
Aitape-Lumi District	Aitape	West Wapei Rural
Nuku District	Nuku	Mawase Rural (Nuku)
Nuku District	Nuku	Palmai Rural
Nuku District	Nuku	Yangkok Rural
Nuku District	Nuku	Maimai Wanwan Rural
Telefomin District	Telefomin	Namea Rural
Telefomin District	Telefomin	Oksapmin Rural
Telefomin District	Telefomin	Telefomin Rural
Telefomin District	Telefomin	Yapsie Rural
Vanimo-Green River District	Vanimo	Amanab Rural
Vanimo-Green River District	Vanimo	Bewani/Wutung Onei Rural
Vanimo-Green River District	Vanimo	Green River Rural
Vanimo-Green River District	Vanimo	Vanimo Urban
Vanimo-Green River District	Vanimo	Walsa Rural

=== Southern Region ===
==== Central Province ====
District	District Capital	LLG Name
Abau District	Abau	Amazon Bay Rural
Abau District	Abau	Aroma Rural
Abau District	Abau	Cloudy Bay Rural
Goilala District	Tapini	Guari Rural
Goilala District	Tapini	Tapini Rural
Goilala District	Tapini	Woitape Rural
Kairuku-Hiri District	Bereina	Hiri Rural
Kairuku-Hiri District	Bereina	Kairuku Rural
Kairuku-Hiri District	Bereina	Koiari Rural
Kairuku-Hiri District	Bereina	Mekeo Kuni Rural
Rigo District	Kwikila	Rigo Central Rural
Rigo District	Kwikila	Rigo Coastal Rural
Rigo District	Kwikila	Rigo Inland Rural

==== Gulf Province ====
District	District Capital	LLG Name
Kerema District	Kerema	Central Kerema Rural
Kerema District	Kerema	East Kerema Rural
Kerema District	Kerema	Kaintiba Rural
Kerema District	Kerema	Kerema Urban
Kerema District	Kerema	Kotidanga Rural
Kerema District	Kerema	Lakekamu-Tauri Rural
Kikori District	Kikori	Baimuru Rural
Kikori District	Kikori	East Kikori Rural
Kikori District	Kikori	Ihu Rural
Kikori District	Kikori	West Kikori Rural

==== Milne Bay Province ====
District	District Capital	LLG Name
Alotau District	Alotau	Alotau Urban
Alotau District	Alotau	Daga Rural
Alotau District	Alotau	Huhu Rural
Alotau District	Alotau	Makamaka Rural
Alotau District	Alotau	Maramatana Rural
Alotau District	Alotau	Suau Rural
Alotau District	Alotau	Weraura Rural
Esa'ala District	Esa'ala	Dobu Rural
Esa'ala District	Esa'ala	Duau Rural
Esa'ala District	Esa'ala	West Ferguson
Kiriwini-Goodenough District	Kiriwina	Goodenough Island Rural
Kiriwini-Goodenough District	Kiriwina	Kiriwina Rural
Samarai-Murua District	Murua	Bwanabwana Rural
Samarai-Murua District	Murua	Louisiade Rural
Samarai-Murua District	Murua	Murua Rural
Samarai-Murua District	Murua	Yaleyamba Rural

==== Oro (Northern) Province ====
District map of Oro Province

District	District Capital	LLG Name
Ijivitari District	Popondetta	Afore Rural
Ijivitari District	Popondetta	Oro Bay Rural
Ijivitari District	Popondetta	Popendetta Urban
Ijivitari District	Popondetta	Safia Urban
Ijivitari District	Popondetta	Tufi Rural (Cape Nelson)
Sohe District	Kokoda	Higaturu Rural
Sohe District	Kokoda	Kira Rural
Sohe District	Kokoda	Kokoda Rural
Sohe District	Kokoda	Tamata Rural

==== Western (Fly) Province ====
District map of Western Province

District	District Capital	LLG Name
North Fly District	Kiunga	Kiunga Rural
North Fly District	Kiunga	Kiunga Urban
North Fly District	Kiunga	Ningerum Rural
North Fly District	Kiunga	Olsobip Rural
North Fly District	Kiunga	Star Mountains Rural
Middle Fly District	Nomad	Balimo Urban
Middle Fly District	Nomad	Bamu Rural
Middle Fly District	Nomad	Gogodala Rural
Middle Fly District	Nomad	Lake Murray Rural
Middle Fly District	Nomad	Nomad Rural
South Fly District	Daru	Daru Urban
South Fly District	Daru	Kiwai Rural
South Fly District	Daru	Morehead Rural
South Fly District	Daru	Oriomo-Bituri Rural
Delta Fly District	Balimo	Bamu Rural
Delta Fly District	Balimo	Wawoi Guavi Rural
Delta Fly District	Balimo	Balimo Urban
Delta Fly District	Balimo	Aramia Gogodala Rural
Delta Fly District	Balimo	Fly Gogodala Rural

==== National Capital District ====
District	District Capital	LLG Name
National Capital District	Port Moresby	Gerehu Urban
National Capital District	Port Moresby	Waigani-University Urban
National Capital District	Port Moresby	Tokarara-Hohola Urban
National Capital District	Port Moresby	Gordons-Saraga Urban
National Capital District	Port Moresby	Boroko-Korobosea Urban
National Capital District	Port Moresby	Kilakila-Kaugere Urban
National Capital District	Port Moresby	Town-Hanuabada Urban
National Capital District	Port Moresby	Laloki-Napanapa Urban
National Capital District	Port Moresby	Bomana Urban

== Demographics and postal codes ==
The following is a list of local-level government areas sorted by postal code. Postal codes, all prefixed with the country code PG, begin with two-digit provincial codes, followed by two-digit district codes, and finally two-digit LLG codes.

Province	District	LLG	Area	Population	Households	No. of Wards	Postal code (LLG)
Western Province	Middle Fly District	Balimo Urban LLG		4394	639	1	PG010101
Western Province	Middle Fly District	Bamu Rural LLG		13432	1964	19	PG010102
Western Province	Middle Fly District	Gogodala Rural LLG		33033	4496	39	PG010103
Western Province	Middle Fly District	Lake Murray Rural LLG		14410	2072	28	PG010104
Western Province	Middle Fly District	Nomad Rural LLG		14080	2490	38	PG010105
Western Province	North Fly District	Kiunga Rural LLG		14883	2619	31	PG010206
Western Province	North Fly District	Kiunga Urban LLG		44375	7266	26	PG010207
Western Province	North Fly District	Ningerum Rural LLG		16697	2739	24	PG010208
Western Province	North Fly District	Olsobip Rural LLG		4886	793	16	PG010209
Western Province	North Fly District	Star Mountains Rural LLG		15403	2411	13	PG010210
Western Province	South Fly District	Daru Urban LLG		15142	2019	1	PG010311
Western Province	South Fly District	Kiwai Rural LLG		17336	2450	24	PG010312
Western Province	South Fly District	Morehead Rural LLG		16133	2802	22	PG010313
Western Province	South Fly District	Oriomo-Bituri Rural LLG		10541	2040	25	PG010314
Gulf Province	Kerema District	Central Kerema Rural LLG		16609	3133	14	PG020101
Gulf Province	Kerema District	East Kerema Rural LLG		13134	2191	8	PG020102
Gulf Province	Kerema District	Kaintiba Rural LLG		12955	2727	15	PG020103
Gulf Province	Kerema District	Kerema Urban LLG		5885	890	1	PG020104
Gulf Province	Kerema District	Kotidanga Rural LLG		45385	6822	20	PG020105
Gulf Province	Kerema District	Lakekamu-Tauri Rural LLG		13263	2246	9	PG020106
Gulf Province	Kikori District	Baimuru Rural LLG		12059	1780	23	PG020207
Gulf Province	Kikori District	East Kikori Rural LLG		11512	1723	15	PG020208
Gulf Province	Kikori District	Ihu Rural LLG		18360	2907	22	PG020209
Gulf Province	Kikori District	West Kikori Rural LLG		9035	1400	17	PG020210
Central Province	Abau District	Amazon Bay Rural LLG		11352	1496	11	PG030101
Central Province	Abau District	Aroma Rural LLG		28639	4278	16	PG030102
Central Province	Abau District	Cloudy Bay Rural LLG		15578	2151	15	PG030103
Central Province	Goilala District	Guari Rural LLG		5602	1066	4	PG030204
Central Province	Goilala District	Tapini Rural LLG		9233	1693	10	PG030205
Central Province	Goilala District	Woitape Rural LLG		21257	3379	9	PG030206
Central Province	Kairuku-Hiri District	Hiri Rural LLG		47094	5520	18	PG030307
Central Province	Kairuku-Hiri District	Kairuku Rural LLG		29485	4890	17	PG030308
Central Province	Kairuku-Hiri District	Koiari Rural LLG		15922	2975	22	PG030309
Central Province	Kairuku-Hiri District	Mekeo Kuni Rural LLG		29085	4762	19	PG030310
Central Province	Rigo District	Rigo Central Rural LLG		15422	2521	29	PG030411
Central Province	Rigo District	Rigo Coastal Rural LLG		25966	3574	23	PG030412
Central Province	Rigo District	Rigo Inland Rural LLG		15121	3004	16	PG030413
National Capital District	National Capital District	National Capital District		364125	47559	9	PG040101
Milne Bay Province	Alotau District	Makamaka Rural LLG		9554	1768	26	PG050101
Milne Bay Province	Alotau District	Daga Rural LLG		7109	1239	18	PG050102
Milne Bay Province	Alotau District	Weraura Rural LLG		15284	3177	30	PG050103
Milne Bay Province	Alotau District	Maramatana Rural LLG		9988	2090	19	PG050104
Milne Bay Province	Alotau District	Huhu Rural LLG		33868	6647	30	PG050105
Milne Bay Province	Alotau District	Suau Rural LLG		11879	2326	29	PG050106
Milne Bay Province	Alotau District	Alotau Urban LLG		11857	1979	1	PG050107
Milne Bay Province	Samarai-Murua District	Bwanabwana Rural LLG		12115	2310	23	PG050208
Milne Bay Province	Samarai-Murua District	Louisiade Rural LLG		23225	4542	32	PG050209
Milne Bay Province	Samarai-Murua District	Yaleyemba Rural LLG		13059	2334	17	PG050210
Milne Bay Province	Samarai-Murua District	Murua Rural LLG		10191	2072	17	PG050211
Milne Bay Province	Kiriwina-Goodenough District	Kiriwina Rural LLG		36721	7005	33	PG050312
Milne Bay Province	Kiriwina-Goodenough District	Goodenough Island Rural LLG		27195	6203	28	PG050313
Milne Bay Province	Esa'ala District	West Ferguson Rural LLG		14786	3013	25	PG050414
Milne Bay Province	Esa'ala District	Dobu Rural LLG		22781	4921	35	PG050415
Milne Bay Province	Esa'ala District	Duau Rural LLG		16900	3636	28	PG050416
Northern (Oro) Province	Ijivitari District	Oro Bay Rural LLG		30060	5326	26	PG060101
Northern (Oro) Province	Ijivitari District	Tufi Rural LLG		18281	3096	20	PG060102
Northern (Oro) Province	Ijivitari District	Afore Rural LLG		18535	5275	18	PG060103
Northern (Oro) Province	Ijivitari District	Popondetta Urban LLG		29454	4932	7	PG060104
Northern (Oro) Province	Ijivitari District	Safia Rural LLG		3432	1075	13	PG060109
Northern (Oro) Province	Sohe District	Kokoda Rural LLG		20925	3549	24	PG060205
Northern (Oro) Province	Sohe District	Higaturu Rural LLG		48702	8004	28	PG060206
Northern (Oro) Province	Sohe District	Tamata Rural LLG		14175	2341	17	PG060207
Northern (Oro) Province	Sohe District	Kira Rural LLG		2745	519	5	PG060208
Southern Highlands Province	Ialibu/Pangia District	East Pangia Rural LLG		15580	3001	26	PG070101
Southern Highlands Province	Ialibu/Pangia District	Ialibu Urban LLG		6914	1439	8	PG070102
Southern Highlands Province	Ialibu/Pangia District	Kewabi Rural LLG		14300	3378	27	PG070103
Southern Highlands Province	Ialibu/Pangia District	Wiru Rural LLG		26684	5003	31	PG070104
Southern Highlands Province	Imbonggu District	Ialibu Basin Rural LLG		23014	4583	20	PG070205
Southern Highlands Province	Imbonggu District	Imbonggu Rural LLG		25156	4914	20	PG070206
Southern Highlands Province	Imbonggu District	Lower Mendi Rural LLG		32824	5416	26	PG070207
Southern Highlands Province	Kagua/Erave District	Erave Rural LLG		15952	2973	28	PG070308
Southern Highlands Province	Kagua/Erave District	Kagua Rural LLG		27338	5366	25	PG070309
Southern Highlands Province	Kagua/Erave District	Kuare Rural LLG		10075	2194	17	PG070310
Southern Highlands Province	Kagua/Erave District	Aiya Rural LLG		20774	3856	23	PG070332
Southern Highlands Province	Mendi/Munihu District	Karints Rural LLG		34194	5954	24	PG070618
Southern Highlands Province	Mendi/Munihu District	Lai Valley Rural LLG		55096	8841	29	PG070619
Southern Highlands Province	Mendi/Munihu District	Mendi Urban LLG		21135	3662	11	PG070620
Southern Highlands Province	Mendi/Munihu District	Upper Mendi Rural LLG		34204	4779	28	PG070621
Southern Highlands Province	Nipa/Kutubu District	Lake Kutubu Rural LLG		16070	2464	18	PG070722
Southern Highlands Province	Nipa/Kutubu District	Mount Bosavi Rural LLG		15136	1307	13	PG070723
Southern Highlands Province	Nipa/Kutubu District	Nembi Plateau Rural LLG		25216	5075	26	PG070724
Southern Highlands Province	Nipa/Kutubu District	Nipa Rural LLG		48573	5966	41	PG070725
Southern Highlands Province	Nipa/Kutubu District	Poroma Rural LLG		42010	7870	24	PG070726
Enga Province	Kandep District	Kandep Rural LLG		42438	6948	52	PG080101
Enga Province	Kandep District	Wage Rural LLG		30664	5229	23	PG080102
Enga Province	Kompiam District	Ambum Rural LLG		21022	3918	25	PG080203
Enga Province	Kompiam District	Kompiam Rural LLG		27505	5473	38	PG080204
Enga Province	Kompiam District	Wapi/Yengis Rural LLG		6097	1074	14	PG080205
Enga Province	Lagaip/Pogera District	Lagaip Rural LLG		44650	7340	31	PG080306
Enga Province	Lagaip/Pogera District	Maip Muritaka Rural LLG		18623	3900	19	PG080307
Enga Province	Lagaip/Pogera District	Paiela/Hewa Rural LLG		20508	2712	16	PG080308
Enga Province	Lagaip/Pogera District	Porgera Rural LLG		45111	6890	18	PG080309
Enga Province	Lagaip/Pogera District	Pilikambi Rural LLG		29981	5396	19	PG080315
Enga Province	Wabag District	Wabag Urban LLG		5041	908	1	PG080410
Enga Province	Wabag District	Wabag Rural LLG		54431	10334	45	PG080411
Enga Province	Wabag District	Maramuni Rural LLG		14177	1494	13	PG080412
Enga Province	Wapenamanda District	Wapenamanda Rural LLG		50334	10721	34	PG080513
Enga Province	Wapenamanda District	Tsak Rural LLG		21463	4084	17	PG080514
Western Highlands Province	Dei District	Dei Rural LLG		61175	14051	25	PG090203
Western Highlands Province	Dei District	Kotna Rural LLG		19841	8872	26	PG090214
Western Highlands Province	Mount Hagen District	Mount Hagen Rural LLG		90469	20141	40	PG090304
Western Highlands Province	Mount Hagen District	Mount Hagen Urban LLG		32830	5681	2	PG090305
Western Highlands Province	Mul/Baiyer District	Mul Rural LLG		37543	8330	47	PG090508
Western Highlands Province	Mul/Baiyer District	Baiyer Rural LLG		32040	7655	47	PG090509
Western Highlands Province	Mul/Baiyer District	Lumusa Rural LLG		13453	3402	25	PG090510
Western Highlands Province	Tambul/Nebilyer District	Mount Giluwe Rural LLG		40578	9164	52	PG090712
Western Highlands Province	Tambul/Nebilyer District	Nebilyer Rural LLG		34921	7805	34	PG090713
Chimbu (Simbu) Province	Chuave District	Chuave Rural LLG		13592	3529	14	PG100101
Chimbu (Simbu) Province	Chuave District	Elimbari Rural LLG		12906	3359	16	PG100102
Chimbu (Simbu) Province	Chuave District	Siane Rural LLG		12523	3573	27	PG100103
Chimbu (Simbu) Province	Gumine District	Bomai/Gumai Rural LLG		12457	3054	12	PG100204
Chimbu (Simbu) Province	Gumine District	Gumine Rural LLG		21954	4890	21	PG100205
Chimbu (Simbu) Province	Gumine District	Mount Digine Rural LLG		22449	4784	12	PG100206
Chimbu (Simbu) Province	Karimui/Nomane District	Karimui Rural LLG		23596	4245	27	PG100307
Chimbu (Simbu) Province	Karimui/Nomane District	Nomane Rural LLG		7859	1873	13	PG100308
Chimbu (Simbu) Province	Karimui/Nomane District	Salt Rural LLG		20704	4158	24	PG100309
Chimbu (Simbu) Province	Kerowagi District	Gena/Waugla Rural LLG		36242	6050	14	PG100410
Chimbu (Simbu) Province	Kerowagi District	Upper/Lower Koronigl Rural LLG		25667	4893	22	PG100411
Chimbu (Simbu) Province	Kerowagi District	Kup Rural LLG		57578	10289	15	PG100412
Chimbu (Simbu) Province	Kerowagi District	Kerowagi Urban LLG		4714	854	1	PG100420
Chimbu (Simbu) Province	Kundiawa/Gembogl District	Kundiawa Urban LLG		10833	1881	1	PG100513
Chimbu (Simbu) Province	Kundiawa/Gembogl District	Mitnande Rural LLG		23860	4018	17	PG100514
Chimbu (Simbu) Province	Kundiawa/Gembogl District	Niglkande Rural LLG		16397	2954	13	PG100515
Chimbu (Simbu) Province	Kundiawa/Gembogl District	Waiye Rural LLG		27431	5474	17	PG100516
Chimbu (Simbu) Province	Sina Sina-Yonggomugl District	Tabare Rural LLG		13717	3211	14	PG100617
Chimbu (Simbu) Province	Sina Sina-Yonggomugl District	Suai Rural LLG		24358	4580	23	PG100618
Chimbu (Simbu) Province	Sina Sina-Yonggomugl District	Yonggomugl Rural LLG		18730	3999	12	PG100619
Eastern Highlands Province	Daulo District	Watabung Rural LLG		7439	2936	6	PG110101
Eastern Highlands Province	Daulo District	Lower Asaro Rural LLG		27241	8418	9	PG110112
Eastern Highlands Province	Daulo District	Upper Asaro Rural LLG		11103	3024	8	PG110113
Eastern Highlands Province	Goroka District	Gahuku Rural LLG		47407	12486	8	PG110202
Eastern Highlands Province	Goroka District	Goroka Urban LLG		23277	3588	2	PG110203
Eastern Highlands Province	Goroka District	Mimanalo Rural LLG		32712	7491	4	PG110214
Eastern Highlands Province	Henganofi District	Kafentina Rural LLG		22882	6012	11	PG110304
Eastern Highlands Province	Henganofi District	Dunantina Rural LLG		19246	4158	8	PG110315
Eastern Highlands Province	Henganofi District	Fayantina Rural LLG		20776	5021	11	PG110316
Eastern Highlands Province	Kainantu District	Kamano No. 2 Rural LLG		18603	3829	6	PG110405
Eastern Highlands Province	Kainantu District	Kainantu Urban LLG		7287	1643	4	PG110406
Eastern Highlands Province	Kainantu District	Kamano No. 1 Rural LLG		31038	7377	6	PG110417
Eastern Highlands Province	Kainantu District	Agarabi Rural LLG		31394	7923	8	PG110418
Eastern Highlands Province	Kainantu District	Gadsup/Tairora Rural LLG		37926	7914	18	PG110419
Eastern Highlands Province	Lufa District	Unavi Rural LLG		10610	2316	9	PG110507
Eastern Highlands Province	Lufa District	Mount Michael Rural LLG		22135	5330	12	PG110520
Eastern Highlands Province	Lufa District	Yagaria Rural LLG		28312	7741	11	PG110521
Eastern Highlands Province	Obura/Wonenara District	Lamari Rural LLG		17854	3655	30	PG110608
Eastern Highlands Province	Obura/Wonenara District	Yelia Rural LLG		22065	4471	34	PG110609
Eastern Highlands Province	Okapa District	East Okapa Rural LLG		41415	9172	17	PG110710
Eastern Highlands Province	Okapa District	West Okapa Rural LLG		31978	7096	17	PG110722
Eastern Highlands Province	Unggai/Benna District	Lower Benna Rural LLG		26330	6446	7	PG110811
Eastern Highlands Province	Unggai/Benna District	Upper Benna Rural LLG		17335	4165	7	PG110823
Eastern Highlands Province	Unggai/Benna District	Unggai Rural LLG		23460	4780	6	PG110824
Morobe Province	Bulolo District	Mumeng Rural LLG		23656	4128	20	PG120101
Morobe Province	Bulolo District	Waria Rural LLG		11381	2239	17	PG120102
Morobe Province	Bulolo District	Watut Rural LLG		17480	3603	12	PG120103
Morobe Province	Bulolo District	Wau/Bulolo Urban LLG		10598	2147	2	PG120104
Morobe Province	Bulolo District	Wau Rural LLG		29253	6759	20	PG120105
Morobe Province	Bulolo District	Buang Rural LLG		9200	1989	20	PG120129
Morobe Province	Finschafen District	Burum Kwat Rural LLG		12081	2820	16	PG120206
Morobe Province	Finschafen District	Kotte Rural LLG		9942	2344	10	PG120207
Morobe Province	Finschafen District	Yabim Mape Rural LLG		16315	3037	20	PG120208
Morobe Province	Finschafen District	Hube Rural LLG		13429	3057	24	PG120232
Morobe Province	Finschafen District	Finschafen Urban LLG		2905	496	1	PG120233
Morobe Province	Huon District	Morobe Rural LLG		13739	2406	21	PG120309
Morobe Province	Huon District	Salamaua Rural LLG		11906	2296	17	PG120310
Morobe Province	Huon District	Wampar Rural LLG		51919	11373	27	PG120311
Morobe Province	Kabwum District	Deyamos Rural LLG		13133	2830	16	PG120412
Morobe Province	Kabwum District	Yus Rural LLG		10937	2185	13	PG120414
Morobe Province	Kabwum District	Komba Rural LLG		9682	2167	19	PG120431
Morobe Province	Kabwum District	Selepet Rural LLG		9720	2060	18	PG120435
Morobe Province	Lae District	Ahi Rural LLG		60326	9523	1	PG120515
Morobe Province	Lae District	Lae Urban LLG		88608	12378	1	PG120516
Morobe Province	Markham District	Onga/Waffa Rural LLG		10304	2074	13	PG120617
Morobe Province	Markham District	Umi/Atzera Rural LLG		36600	7932	30	PG120618
Morobe Province	Markham District	Wantoat/Leron Rural LLG		15591	3346	20	PG120619
Morobe Province	Menyamya District	Kome Rural LLG		31043	6172	16	PG120721
Morobe Province	Menyamya District	Wapi Rural LLG		16730	3449	15	PG120722
Morobe Province	Menyamya District	Kapao Rural LLG		19425	3980	15	PG120730
Morobe Province	Menyamya District	Nanima Kariba Rural LLG		20011	3562	14	PG120734
Morobe Province	Nawae District	Labuta Rural LLG		13904	2825	14	PG120823
Morobe Province	Nawae District	Nabak Rural LLG		9865	1903	14	PG120824
Morobe Province	Nawae District	Wain-Erap Rural LLG		20787	4302	18	PG120825
Morobe Province	Tawae/Siassi District	Sialum Rural LLG		22840	4509	19	PG120926
Morobe Province	Tawae/Siassi District	Siassi Rural LLG		17660	3462	20	PG120927
Morobe Province	Tawae/Siassi District	Wasu Rural LLG		13840	2756	18	PG120928
Madang Province	Bogia District	Almami Rural LLG		23605	4344	37	PG130101
Madang Province	Bogia District	Iabu Rural LLG		9895	1916	15	PG130102
Madang Province	Bogia District	Yawar Rural LLG		41567	7510	39	PG130103
Madang Province	Madang District	Ambenob Rural LLG		54038	9907	22	PG130204
Madang Province	Madang District	Madang Urban LLG		35971	5534	1	PG130205
Madang Province	Madang District	Transgogol Rural LLG		20969	3555	16	PG130206
Madang Province	Middle Ramu District	Arabaka Rural LLG		29544	4792	34	PG130307
Madang Province	Middle Ramu District	Josephstaal Rural LLG		19315	3470	26	PG130308
Madang Province	Middle Ramu District	Simbai Rural LLG		18595	3082	18	PG130309
Madang Province	Middle Ramu District	Kovon Rural LLG		11438	1990	15	PG130317
Madang Province	Rai Coast District	Astrolabe Bay Rural LLG		19417	3015	15	PG130410
Madang Province	Rai Coast District	Naho Rawa Rural LLG		14027	2756	20	PG130411
Madang Province	Rai Coast District	Rai Coast Rural LLG		40353	6743	40	PG130412
Madang Province	Rai Coast District	Nayudo Rural LLG		9421	1624	14	PG130418
Madang Province	Sumkar District	Karkar Rural LLG		49454	9298	33	PG130513
Madang Province	Sumkar District	Sumgilbar Rural LLG		35490	6232	31	PG130514
Madang Province	Usino Bundi District	Bundi Rural LLG		14681	2345	22	PG130615
Madang Province	Usino Bundi District	Usino Rural LLG		35286	6130	31	PG130616
Madang Province	Usino Bundi District	Gama Rural LLG		10840	1897	13	PG130619
East Sepik Province	Ambunti/Drekikier District	Ambunti Rural LLG		21725	4232	30	PG140101
East Sepik Province	Ambunti/Drekikier District	Dreikikier Rural LLG		24359	5560	33	PG140102
East Sepik Province	Ambunti/Drekikier District	Gawanga Rural LLG		12674	2805	22	PG140103
East Sepik Province	Ambunti/Drekikier District	Tunap/Hunstein Rural LLG		12546	2553	38	PG140104
East Sepik Province	Angoram District	Angoram/Middle Sepik Rural LLG		25377	4158	35	PG140205
East Sepik Province	Angoram District	Karawari Rural LLG		14204	2411	30	PG140206
East Sepik Province	Angoram District	Keram Rural LLG		24806	4001	38	PG140207
East Sepik Province	Angoram District	Marienberg Rural LLG		20840	3791	29	PG140208
East Sepik Province	Angoram District	Yuat Rural LLG		12908	2242	21	PG140209
East Sepik Province	Maprik District	Albiges/Mablep Rural LLG		14657	3321	14	PG140310
East Sepik Province	Maprik District	Bumbita/Muhian Rural LLG		18806	4148	17	PG140311
East Sepik Province	Maprik District	Maprik/Wora Rural LLG		21374	4325	18	PG140312
East Sepik Province	Maprik District	Yamil/Tamaui Rural LLG		17398	3454	16	PG140313
East Sepik Province	Wewak District	Boikin/Dagua Rural LLG		20907	3859	24	PG140414
East Sepik Province	Wewak District	Turubu Rural LLG		11727	2130	21	PG140415
East Sepik Province	Wewak District	Wewak Islands Rural LLG		10873	2172	21	PG140416
East Sepik Province	Wewak District	Wewak Rural LLG		19783	3902	17	PG140417
East Sepik Province	Wewak District	Wewak Urban LLG		24471	4215	1	PG140418
East Sepik Province	Wosera Gawi District	Burui/Kunai Rural LLG		13249	2583	25	PG140519
East Sepik Province	Wosera Gawi District	Gawi Rural LLG		9616	1970	25	PG140520
East Sepik Province	Wosera Gawi District	North Wosera Rural LLG		16908	3665	26	PG140521
East Sepik Province	Wosera Gawi District	South Wosera Rural LLG		22257	4288	28	PG140522
East Sepik Province	Yangoru Saussia District	East Yangoru Rural LLG		18309	3544	27	PG140623
East Sepik Province	Yangoru Saussia District	Numbor Rural LLG		13347	2649	23	PG140624
East Sepik Province	Yangoru Saussia District	Sausso Rural LLG		11179	2156	21	PG140625
East Sepik Province	Yangoru Saussia District	West Yangoru Rural LLG		16043	3331	25	PG140626
West Sepik (Sandaun) Province	Aitape/Lumi District	East Aitape Rural LLG		32148	4987	24	PG150101
West Sepik (Sandaun) Province	Aitape/Lumi District	East Wapei Rural LLG		10759	1994	15	PG150102
West Sepik (Sandaun) Province	Aitape/Lumi District	West Aitape Rural LLG		19258	3066	25	PG150103
West Sepik (Sandaun) Province	Aitape/Lumi District	West Wapei Rural LLG		10154	1872	15	PG150104
West Sepik (Sandaun) Province	Nuku District	Mawase Rural LLG		24251	5410	24	PG150205
West Sepik (Sandaun) Province	Nuku District	Palmai Rural LLG		13519	2971	19	PG150206
West Sepik (Sandaun) Province	Nuku District	Yangkok Rural LLG		16425	3412	22	PG150207
West Sepik (Sandaun) Province	Nuku District	Maimai Wanwan Rural LLG		3963	1666	15	PG150217
West Sepik (Sandaun) Province	Telefomin District	Namea Rural LLG		9373	1478	15	PG150308
West Sepik (Sandaun) Province	Telefomin District	Oksapmin Rural LLG		18629	3131	21	PG150309
West Sepik (Sandaun) Province	Telefomin District	Telefomin Rural LLG		11734	1806	26	PG150310
West Sepik (Sandaun) Province	Telefomin District	Yapsie Rural LLG		9146	1532	20	PG150311
West Sepik (Sandaun) Province	Vanimo/Green River District	Amanab Rural LLG		11869	2236	18	PG150412
West Sepik (Sandaun) Province	Vanimo/Green River District	Bewani/Wutung Onei Rural LLG		20813	3352	27	PG150413
West Sepik (Sandaun) Province	Vanimo/Green River District	Green River Rural LLG		14266	2241	36	PG150414
West Sepik (Sandaun) Province	Vanimo/Green River District	Vanimo Urban LLG		13970	2370	1	PG150415
West Sepik (Sandaun) Province	Vanimo/Green River District	Walsa Rural LLG		8134	1410	13	PG150416
Manus Province	Manus District	Aua Wuvulu Rural LLG		1459	321	6	PG160101
Manus Province	Manus District	Nigoherm Rural LLG		1930	268	6	PG160102
Manus Province	Manus District	Bisikani/Soparibeu Kabin Rural LLG		6388	1238	14	PG160103
Manus Province	Manus District	Pomutu/Kurti/Andra Rural LLG		7377	1151	18	PG160104
Manus Province	Manus District	Lelemadih/Bupichupeu Rural LLG		8619	1477	17	PG160105
Manus Province	Manus District	Lorengau Urban LLG		8882	1268	1	PG160106
Manus Province	Manus District	Los Negros Rural LLG		3494	755	9	PG160107
Manus Province	Manus District	Nali Sopat/Penabu Rural LLG		5154	836	18	PG160108
Manus Province	Manus District	Tetidu Rural LLG		3149	591	6	PG160109
Manus Province	Manus District	Pobuma Rural LLG		6077	1119	9	PG160110
Manus Province	Manus District	Balopa Rural LLG		3516	590	9	PG160111
Manus Province	Manus District	Rapatona Rural LLG		4440	746	9	PG160112
New Ireland Province	Kavieng District	Murat Rural LLG		4210	854	6	PG170101
New Ireland Province	Kavieng District	Lovongai Rural LLG		29005	4623	19	PG170102
New Ireland Province	Kavieng District	Tikana Rural LLG		33222	5476	19	PG170103
New Ireland Province	Kavieng District	Kavieng Urban LLG		16725	2244	4	PG170104
New Ireland Province	Namatanai District	Namatanai Rural LLG		29767	4570	21	PG170205
New Ireland Province	Namatanai District	Sentral Niu Ailan Rural LLG		29932	4763	22	PG170206
New Ireland Province	Namatanai District	Konoagil Rural LLG		13132	1748	17	PG170207
New Ireland Province	Namatanai District	Tanir Rural LLG		12466	1822	14	PG170208
New Ireland Province	Namatanai District	Nimamar Rural LLG		25608	3534	16	PG170209
East New Britain Province	Gazelle District	Central Gazelle Rural LLG		28075	5516	20	PG180101
East New Britain Province	Gazelle District	Inland Baining Rural LLG		26826	4722	26	PG180102
East New Britain Province	Gazelle District	Lassul Baining Rural LLG		13555	2586	22	PG180103
East New Britain Province	Gazelle District	Livuan/Reimber Rural LLG		28973	5478	29	PG180104
East New Britain Province	Gazelle District	Vunadidir/Toma Rural LLG		31888	6521	32	PG180105
East New Britain Province	Kokopo District	Bitapaka Rural LLG		23116	3517	22	PG180206
East New Britain Province	Kokopo District	Duke of York Rural LLG		14009	2317	21	PG180207
East New Britain Province	Kokopo District	Kokopo/Vunamami Urban LLG		31965	4679	21	PG180208
East New Britain Province	Kokopo District	Raluana Rural LLG		18739	3078	20	PG180209
East New Britain Province	Pomio District	Central/Inland Pomio Rural LLG		20456	3739	33	PG180310
East New Britain Province	Pomio District	East Pomio Rural LLG		7478	1382	13	PG180311
East New Britain Province	Pomio District	Melkoi Rural LLG		11257	2073	19	PG180312
East New Britain Province	Pomio District	Sinivit Rural LLG		19103	3294	19	PG180313
East New Britain Province	Pomio District	West Pomio/Mamusi Rural LLG		13542	2827	34	PG180314
East New Britain Province	Rabaul District	Balanataman Rural LLG		19621	3252	19	PG180415
East New Britain Province	Rabaul District	Kombiu Rural LLG		11583	2094	13	PG180416
East New Britain Province	Rabaul District	Rabaul Urban LLG		4785	775	1	PG180417
East New Britain Province	Rabaul District	Watom Island Rural LLG		3398	608	6	PG180418
West New Britain Province	Kandrian/Gloucester District	Gasmata Rural LLG		11439	2158	7	PG190101
West New Britain Province	Kandrian/Gloucester District	Gloucester Rural LLG		11940	2148	8	PG190102
West New Britain Province	Kandrian/Gloucester District	Kandrian Coastal Rural LLG		17073	5739	13	PG190103
West New Britain Province	Kandrian/Gloucester District	Kandrian Inland Rural LLG		13248	2615	11	PG190104
West New Britain Province	Kandrian/Gloucester District	Kove/Kaliai Rural LLG		20565	3618	13	PG190105
West New Britain Province	Talasea District	Bialla Rural LLG		58373	10283	19	PG190206
West New Britain Province	Talasea District	Bali/Witu Rural LLG		16665	2815	7	PG190207
West New Britain Province	Talasea District	Hoskins Rural LLG		27665	4498	9	PG190208
West New Britain Province	Talasea District	Kimbe Urban LLG		22923	5078	1	PG190209
West New Britain Province	Talasea District	Mosa Rural LLG		36380	6139	9	PG190210
West New Britain Province	Talasea District	Talasea Rural LLG		27993	5653	10	PG190211
Autonomous Region of Bougainville	North Bougainville District	Tinputz Rural LLG		16661	3066	3	PG200101
Autonomous Region of Bougainville	North Bougainville District	Kunua Rural LLG		13525	2870	4	PG200102
Autonomous Region of Bougainville	North Bougainville District	Selau/Suir Rural LLG		15141	2852	6	PG200103
Autonomous Region of Bougainville	North Bougainville District	Buka Rural LLG		53986	8157	7	PG200104
Autonomous Region of Bougainville	North Bougainville District	Nissan Rural LLG		6810	1228	3	PG200105
Autonomous Region of Bougainville	North Bougainville District	Atolls Rural LLG		2900	719	4	PG200106
Autonomous Region of Bougainville	Central Bougainville District	Wakunai Rural LLG		13795	3806	10	PG200207
Autonomous Region of Bougainville	Central Bougainville District	Arawa Rural LLG		44865	9205	16	PG200208
Autonomous Region of Bougainville	South Bougainville District	Buin Rural LLG		35327	6483	6	PG200309
Autonomous Region of Bougainville	South Bougainville District	Siwai Rural LLG		17624	3588	9	PG200310
Autonomous Region of Bougainville	South Bougainville District	Bana Rural LLG		22457	4655	8	PG200311
Autonomous Region of Bougainville	South Bougainville District	Torokina Rural LLG		6267	1604	5	PG200312
Hela Province	Komo/Magarima District	Hulia Rural LLG		41642	7996	31	PG210411
Hela Province	Komo/Magarima District	Komo Rural LLG		18907	5652	26	PG210412
Hela Province	Komo/Magarima District	Lower Wage Rural LLG		20654	7291	20	PG210413
Hela Province	Komo/Magarima District	Upper Wage Rural LLG		14950	5872	21	PG210431
Hela Province	Koroba/Kopiago District	Awi/Pori Rural LLG		21198	6012	25	PG210514
Hela Province	Koroba/Kopiago District	Lake Kopiago Rural LLG		18088	5020	19	PG210515
Hela Province	Koroba/Kopiago District	North Koroba Rural LLG		13631	4995	26	PG210516
Hela Province	Koroba/Kopiago District	South Koroba Rural LLG		20938	6589	23	PG210517
Hela Province	Tari/Pori District	Hayapuga Rural LLG		18047	4969	21	PG210827
Hela Province	Tari/Pori District	Tagali Rural LLG		10672	3170	20	PG210828
Hela Province	Tari/Pori District	Tari Urban LLG		39279	4857	9	PG210829
Hela Province	Tari/Pori District	Tebi Rural LLG		11443	2848	19	PG210830
Jiwaka Province	Anglimp/South Waghi District	Anglimp Rural LLG		200	200	36	PG220101
Jiwaka Province	Anglimp/South Waghi District	South Waghi Rural LLG		93808	19029	48	PG220102
Jiwaka Province	Jimi District	Jimi Rural LLG		44974	8495	36	PG220406
Jiwaka Province	Jimi District	Kol Rural LLG		26405	5682	25	PG220407
Jiwaka Province	North Waghi District	North Waghi Rural LLG		46401	9375	24	PG220611
Jiwaka Province	North Waghi District	Nondugl Rural LLG		32098	6517	21	PG220615

== See also ==
- Districts of Papua New Guinea
- Provinces of Papua New Guinea
- Regions of Papua New Guinea
- List of cities and towns in Papua New Guinea
- List of cities and towns in Papua New Guinea by population
