= Erave Rural LLG =

Local-level government in Papua New Guinea

- Location within Papua New Guinea
- Coordinates: 6.606044°S 143.897696°E
- Country: Papua New Guinea
- Province: Southern Highlands Province
- Time zone: UTC+10 (AEST)

Erave Rural LLG is a local-level government (LLG) of Southern Highlands Province, Papua New Guinea. The Erave language is spoken in the LLG.

== Wards ==
- 01. Galu
- 02. Tiripi
- 03. Batri 1
- 04. Batri 2
- 05. Iamorubi
- 06. Erave Station
- 07. Koyari
- 08.Tiabili
- 09. Kerabi
- 10. Balowai
- 11. Tiri
- 12. Waraga
- 13. Waposale
- 14. Kele
- 15. Puputau
- 16. Sirigi
- 17. Sopisa
- 18. Menekiri
- 19. Marorogo
- 20. Walo
- 21. Yanguli 1
- 22. Yanguli 2
- 23. Pawabi 1
- 24. Pawabi 2
- 25. Sau
- 26. Kati
- 27. Pawale
- 28. Niae
