= Nondugl Rural LLG =

Local-level government in Papua New Guinea

- Location within Papua New Guinea
- Coordinates: 5.861427°S 144.769755°E
- Country: Papua New Guinea
- Province: Jiwaka Province
- Time zone: UTC+10 (AEST)

Nondugl Rural LLG is a local-level government (LLG) of Jiwaka Province, Papua New Guinea.

== North Waghi Wards/Census Units (CUs) ==
Nondugl Rural LLG:

1. Bamna/Bamuna 1: 3 CUs
2. Bamna/Bamuna 2: 2 CUs
3. Domil 1: 5 CUs
4. Domil 2: 6 CUs
5. Kapalku 1: 6 CUs
6. Kapalku 2: 6 CUs
7. Kaming 1: 7 CUs
8. Kombulno 1: 4 CUs
9. Kombulno 2: 4 CUs
10. Kombulno 3: 5 CUs
11. Kumbal 1: 10 CUs
12. Kumbal 2: 8 CUs
13. Milep 1: 8 CUs
14. Milep 2: 3 CUs
15. Munumul 1: 6 CUs
16. Munumul 2: 4 CUs
17. Munumul 3: 6 CUs
18. Nondugl 1: 4 CUs
19. Nondugl 2: 6 CUs
20. Ngumbkora: 5 CUs
21. Onil 1: 9 CUs
