= Central/Inland Pomio Rural LLG =

Local-level government in Papua New Guinea

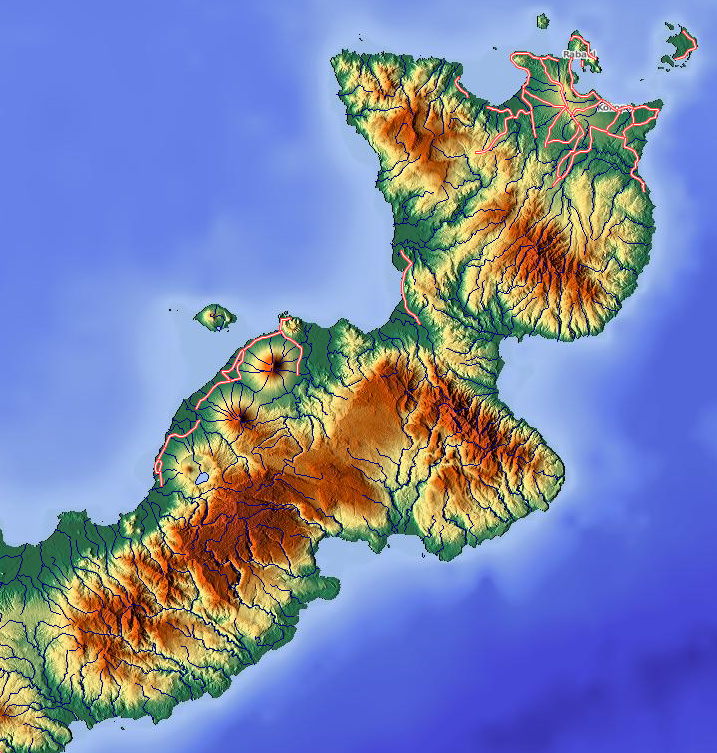
- Location within Papua New Guinea
- Coordinates: 5.521184°S 151.517524°E
- Country: Papua New Guinea
- Province: East New Britain Province
- Time zone: UTC+10 (AEST)

Central/Inland Pomio Rural LLG is a local-level government (LLG) of East New Britain Province, Papua New Guinea.

== Wards ==
- 01. Parole
- 02. Malakur
- 03. Kerkernena
- 04. Baien (West)
- 05. Galue
- 06. Marmar
- 07. Pomio
- 08. Olaipun
- 09. Sali
- 10. Bovalpun
- 11. Kalakru
- 12. Kawa
- 13. Tokai
- 14. Matong
- 15. Buka
- 16. Pulpul
- 17. Pakia
- 18. Mile
- 19. Mukulu
- 20. Malvoni
- 21. Muela
- 22. Bago
- 23. Pakaraman
- 24. Birigi
- 25. Bagitave
- 26. Kapkena
- 27. Tuki
- 28. Lakiri
- 29. Marmu
- 30. Masuari
- 31. Manigugule
- 32. Kavale
- 33. Gelioi
