= Mount Giluwe Rural LLG =

Local-level government in Papua New Guinea

- Location within Papua New Guinea
- Coordinates: 5.879665°S 143.957796°E
- Country: Papua New Guinea
- Province: Western Highlands Province
- Time zone: UTC+10 (AEST)

Mount Giluwe Rural LLG is a local-level government (LLG) of Western Highlands Province, Papua New Guinea. Mount Giluwe is located within the LLG.

== Wards ==
- 01. Gihamu 1
- 02. Gihamu 2
- 03. Muga
- 04. Paiakona.1
- 05. Paiakona.2
- 06. Toroika
- 07. Kamunga 1
- 08. Kamunga 2
- 09. Tomba
- 10. Tsingibai.1
- 11. Tsingibai.3
- 12. Tsingibai 2
- 13. Tsingibai 4
- 14. Karapangi
- 15. Pulgumong
- 16. Kikuwa
- 17. Pommboli
- 18. Kumbaipulg
- 19. Maltaka
- 20. Kamindi
- 21. Pagapena 1
- 22. Pagapena.2
- 23. Pagapena 3
- 24. Oiapulg. 1
- 25. Oiapugl.2
- 26. Awabo
- 27. Laiagam 1
- 28. Laiagam 2
- 29. Malke 1
- 30. Malke 2
- 31. Kagop 1
- 32. Kagop 2
- 33. Kagop 3
- 34. Alkena 1
- 35. Alkena 2
- 36. Alkena.3
- 37. Iapauga
- 38. Wambul 1
- 39. Wambul 2
- 40. Kopine
- 41. Bonga.1
- 42. Bonga.2
- 43. Koroka
- 44. Kerepia.1
- 45. Kerepia.2
- 46. Kerepia.3
- 47. Tamal
- 48. Palnol
- 49. Gia.1
- 50. Gia.2
- 51. Kombolga
- 52. Marapugl
