= Mul Rural LLG =

Local-level government in Papua New Guinea

- Country: Papua New Guinea
- Province: Western Highlands Province
- Time zone: UTC+10 (AEST)

Mul Rural LLG is a local-level government (LLG) of Western Highlands Province, Papua New Guinea.

== Wards ==
- 01. Bukapena
- 02. Kileg.1
- 03. Kileg.2
- 04. Kileg.3
- 05. Kalenga 1
- 06. Kalenga 2
- 07. Wurup
- 08. Kwinga.1
- 09. Kwinga.2
- 10. Kwinga.3
- 11. Kwinga.4
- 12. Bita
- 13. Kum
- 14. Mabulga.1
- 15. Mabulga.2
- 16. Mabulga.3
- 17. Mambuga.4
- 18. Rugli.1
- 19. Rugli.2
- 20. Keregamp
- 21. Kopalge
- 22. Kumdi
- 23. Namba
- 24. Murip
- 25. Kiliga
- 26. Minimp
- 27. Koibuga.1
- 28. Koibuga.2
- 29. Koibuga.3
- 30. Koibuga.4
- 31. Angiki.1
- 32. Angiki.2
- 33. Kilimp
- 34. Wara.1
- 35. Wara.2
- 36. Wara.3
- 37. Kolg
- 38. Kwip.1
- 39. Kwip.2
- 40. Tondomong.1
- 41. Tondomong.2
- 42. Tondomong.3
- 43. Balk.1
- 44. Balk.2
- 45. Balk.3
- 46. Balk.4
- 47. Ebuga
