= Raluana Rural LLG =

Local-level government in Papua New Guinea

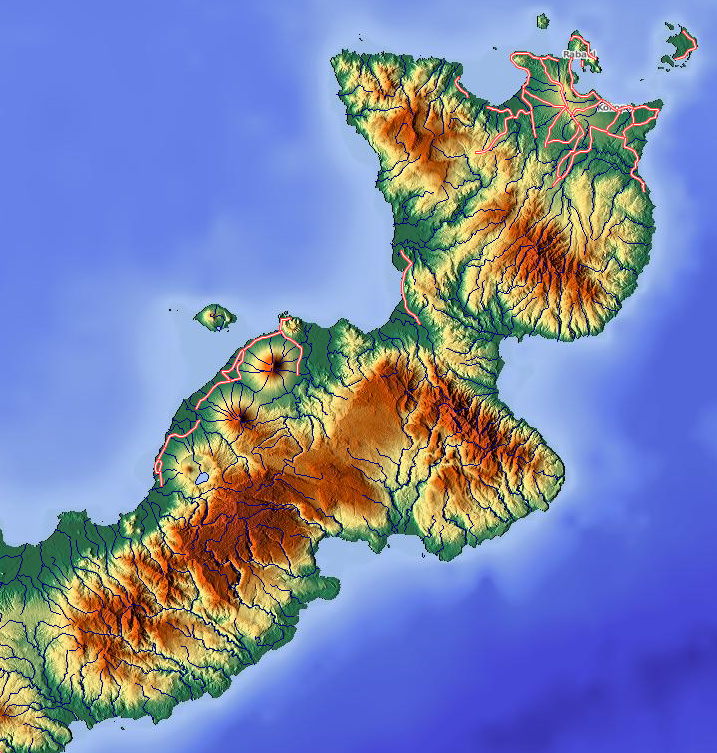
- Location within Papua New Guinea
- Coordinates: 4.305346°S 152.220319°E
- Country: Papua New Guinea
- Province: East New Britain Province
- Time zone: UTC+10 (AEST)

Raluana Rural LLG is a local-level government (LLG) of East New Britain Province, Papua New Guinea.

== Wards ==
- 01. Raburua
- 02. Bitatita
- 03. Nguvalian
- 04. Raluana
- 05. Barovon
- 06. Ialakua
- 07. Vunatagia
- 08. Ranguna
- 09. Bitabaur
- 10. Vunamurmur
- 12. Vunaulul
- 13. Ralalar
- 14. Turagunan
- 15. Kunakunai
- 16. Ngatur
- 17. Tinganalom
- 18. Nanuk
- 19. Balanataman
- 20. Ravat
- 21. Talakua
