= Kiriwina Rural LLG =

Local-level government in Papua New Guinea

Kiriwini Rural LLG
- Location within Papua New Guinea
- Coordinates: 8.60°S 151.06°E
- Country: Papua New Guinea
- Province: Milne Bay Province
- Time zone: UTC+10 (AEST)

Kiriwini Rural LLG is a local-level government (LLG) of Milne Bay Province, Papua New Guinea.

== Wards ==
- 01. Kaibola
- 02. Mwatawa
- 03. Tubowada
- 04. Dayagila
- 05. Liluta
- 06. Kwebwaga
- 07. Omarakana
- 08. Kabwaku
- 09. Okaikoda
- 10. Yalumgwa
- 11. Kuruvitu
- 12. Yalaka
- 13. Wabutuma
- 14. Bwetalu
- 15. Gumilababa
- 16. Kapwapu
- 17. Kavataria
- 18. Mulosaida
- 19. Oyuveyova
- 20. Tukwaukwa
- 21. Okaiboma
- 22. Ilalima
- 23. Obulaku
- 24. Sinaketa
- 25. Loya
- 26. Vakuta
- 27. Kwumwagea
- 28. Lalela
- 29. Okabulula
- 30. Kaduwaga
- 31. Koma
- 32. Kuyawa
- 33. Simsimla
