= Balanataman Rural LLG =

Local-level government in Papua New Guinea

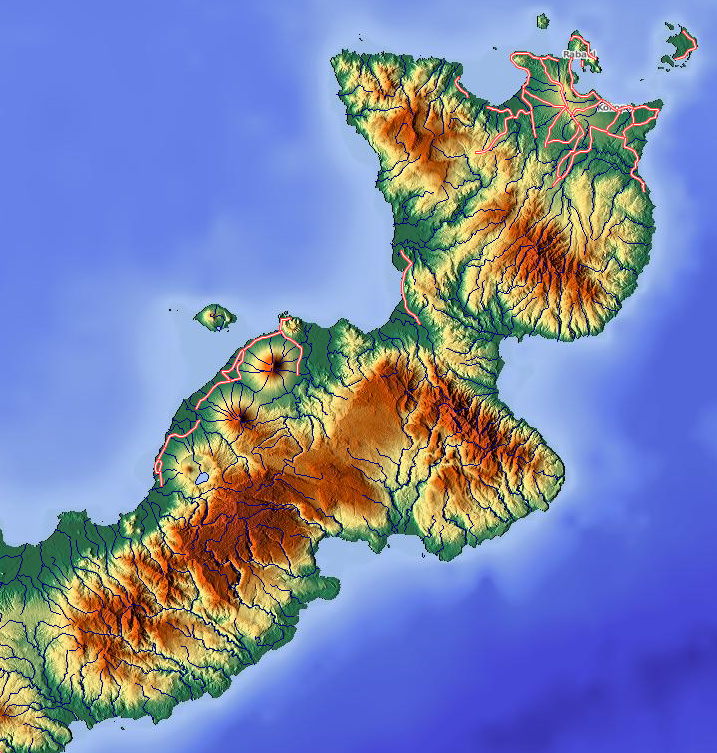
- Location within Papua New Guinea
- Coordinates: 4.157201°S 152.14818°E
- Country: Papua New Guinea
- Province: East New Britain Province
- Time zone: UTC+10 (AEST)

Balanataman Rural LLG is a local-level government (LLG) of East New Britain Province, Papua New Guinea.

== Wards ==
- 01. Ratung
- 02. Pilapila
- 03. Karavia
- 04. Ratavul
- 05. Volavolo
- 06. Nonga
- 07. Tavui No.1
- 08. Tavui No.2
- 09. Tavui No.3
- 10. Malaguna No.1
- 11. Malaguna No.2
- 12. Malaguna No.3
- 13. Iawakaka
- 14. Rapolo
- 15. Raluan No.1
- 16. Raluan No.2
- 17. Tavana
- 18. Valaur
- 19. Nonga Base Hospital
