= Aua-Wuvulu Rural LLG =

Local-level government in Papua New Guinea

- Country: Papua New Guinea
- Province: Manus Province
- Time zone: UTC+10 (AEST)

Aua-Wuvulu Rural LLG is a local-level government (LLG) of Manus Province, Papua New Guinea.

== Wards ==
- 01. Auna 1
- 02. Onnei 1
- 03. Aua Island 1
- 04. Aua 2
- 05. Onnei 2
- 06. Auna 2
