= East Pangia Rural LLG =

Local-level government in Papua New Guinea

- Location within Papua New Guinea
- Coordinates: 6.380691°S 144.109358°E
- Country: Papua New Guinea
- Province: Southern Highlands Province
- Time zone: UTC+10 (AEST)

East Pangia Rural LLG is a local-level government (LLG) of Southern Highlands Province, Papua New Guinea.

== Wards ==
- 01. Molo
- 02. Alia
- 03. Morea 1
- 04. Morea 2
- 05. Pokale 1
- 06. Pokale 2
- 07. Apenda 1
- 08. Apenda 2
- 09. Mele 1
- 10. Mele 2
- 11. Kumiane
- 12. Pondi
- 13. Pangia Station
- 14. Maia
- 15. Kauwo 1
- 16. Kauwo 2
- 17. Kauwo 3
- 18. Leka/Koiya
- 19. Yunguli
- 20. Tindua 1
- 21. Tindua 2
- 22. Walapape
- 23. Walapape
- 24. Walupo
- 25. Walupoi
- 26. Mondanda
