= West Ferguson Rural LLG =

Local-level government in Papua New Guinea

- Location within Papua New Guinea
- Coordinates: 9.51°S 150.58°E
- Country: Papua New Guinea
- Province: Milne Bay Province
- Time zone: UTC+10 (AEST)

West Ferguson Rural LLG is a local-level government (LLG) of Milne Bay Province, Papua New Guinea.

== Wards ==
- 01. Fayayana
- 02. Ailuluai
- 03. Ukeokeo
- 04. Toagesi
- 05. Igwageta
- 06. Kukuya
- 07. Ibwananiu
- 08. Mapamoiwa
- 09. Fagululu
- 10. Iamalele South
- 11. Iamalele North
- 12. Gewata
- 13. Saibutu
- 14. Niubuo
- 15. Ebadidi
- 16. Tutubea
- 17. Bwayobwayo
- 18. Masimasi
- 19. Gwabegwabe
- 20. Atugamwana
- 21. Agealuma
- 22. Didiau
- 23. Kalokalo
- 24. Fatavi
- 25. Wapolu
