= Boikin/Dagua Rural LLG =

Local-level government in Papua New Guinea

- Location within Papua New Guinea
- Coordinates: 3.427696°S 143.447737°E
- Country: Papua New Guinea
- Province: East Sepik Province
- Time zone: UTC+10 (AEST)

Boikin/Dagua Rural LLG is a local-level government (LLG) of East Sepik Province, Papua New Guinea.

== Wards ==
- 01. Hawain
- 02. Niumegin
- 03. Aring/Surumba
- 04. Penjen/Peringa
- 05. Siro/Wanjo
- 06. Boikin/Dagua
- 07. Karawap
- 08. You island
- 09. Karasau (Est)
- 10. Banak/Hogi
- 11. Bogumatai/Wautogik
- 12. Dogur
- 13. Woginara (1)
- 14. Woginara (2)
- 15. Sapuain
- 16. Urip
- 17. Mogopin
- 18. Maguer
- 19. Smain/But
- 20. Lowan
- 21. Kauk/Balam
- 22. Sowom
- 23. Kotai
- 24. Kubren
