= Nali Sopat/Penabu Rural LLG =

Local-level government in Papua New Guinea

- Country: Papua New Guinea
- Province: Manus Province
- Time zone: UTC+10 (AEST)

Nali Sopat/Penabu Rural LLG is a local-level government (LLG) of Manus Province, Papua New Guinea.

== Wards ==
- 01. N'drapitou
- 02. Soheneriu
- 03. Kapou
- 04. Bulihan
- 05. Karun
- 06. Sirrah
- 07. Lawes
- 08. Nohang
- 09. Katin
- 10. Lowaiya
- 11. Lapap Lahan
- 12. Maleh
- 13. M'bunai
- 14. Pere 1
- 18. Patusi
- 19. Pere 2
- 20. Pachal
- 21. Machaparloh
