= Hayapuga Rural LLG =

Local-level government in Papua New Guinea

- Location within Papua New Guinea
- Coordinates: 5.90538°S 142.87207°E
- Country: Papua New Guinea
- Province: Hela Province
- Time zone: UTC+10 (AEST)

Hayapuga Rural LLG a local-level government (LLG) of Koroba-Kopiago District in Hela Province, Papua New Guinea.

== Wards ==
- 01. Hare
- 02. Munima / Wenani
- 03. Tani Walete / Taunda
- 04. Halimbu
- 05. Tobani / Halimbu 2
- 06. Hambuari
- 07. Linabeni
- 08. Peri
- 09. Kutama
- 10. Tindima
- 11. Hiwanda
- 12. Mindiratogo / Hiwanda 2
- 13. Telabo
- 14. Hapono
- 15. Undupi
- 16. Gugubalu / Hundupi
- 17. Warolo
- 18. Teni (Hundupi)
- 19. Agau / Teni 2
- 20. Idauwi / Teni 3
- 21. Yapira / Idawi
