= Watabung Rural LLG =

Local-level government in Papua New Guinea

- Country: Papua New Guinea
- Province: Eastern Highlands Province
- Time zone: UTC+10 (AEST)

District map of Eastern Highlands Province

Watabung Rural LLG is a local-level government (LLG) of Eastern Highlands Province, Papua New Guinea.

== Wards ==
- 01. Mangiro
- 02. Kenangi
- 03. Koningi
- 04. Komoingareka
- 05. Yamofe
- 06. Komongu
