= Lower Mendi Rural LLG =

Local-level government in Papua New Guinea

- Country: Papua New Guinea
- Province: Southern Highlands Province
- Time zone: UTC+10 (AEST)

Lower Mendi Rural LLG is a local-level government (LLG) of Southern Highlands Province, Papua New Guinea.

== Wards ==
- 01. Endowa
- 02. Tepe/Eskamb
- 03. Sumia 1
- 04. Sumia 2
- 05. Sumia 3
- 05. Yore 1
- 06. Yore 2
- 07. Tutam
- 08. Yebi 1
- 09. Yebi 2
- 10. Aisaisa
- 11. Pundia/Limbiali
- 12. Megi
- 13. Onne
- 14. Yaken 1
- 15. Yebi 3
- 16. Omai
- 17. Pororo
- 18. Mil/Warip
- 19. Sumia 3
- 20. Yaria
- 21. Kiberu
- 22. Yaken 1
- 23. Bui-iebi
- 24. Lumbi/Tutam
- 25. Una/Kos
- 26. Pinj
