= Kaintiba Rural LLG =

Local-level government in Papua New Guinea

- Location within Papua New Guinea
- Coordinates: 7.499987°S 146.034623°E
- Country: Papua New Guinea
- Province: Gulf Province
- Time zone: UTC+10 (AEST)

Kaintiba Rural LLG is a local-level government (LLG) of Gulf Province, Papua New Guinea.

== Wards ==
- 01. Bema
- 02. Mine
- 03. Wimka
- 04. Wempango
- 05. Kaingo
- 06. Hambia
- 07. Yemepango
- 08. Hawabango
- 09. Karangea
- 10. Kwoi'amunga
- 11. Kengo
- 12. Hapataewa
- 13. Kaintiba Station
- 14. Ikose
- 15. Yakitangwa
