= Karints Rural LLG =

Local-level government in Papua New Guinea

- Location within Papua New Guinea
- Coordinates: 6.023°S 143.603°E
- Country: Papua New Guinea
- Province: Southern Highlands Province
- Time zone: UTC+10 (AEST)

Karints Rural LLG is a local-level government (LLG) of Southern Highlands Province, Papua New Guinea.

== Wards ==
- 01. Puinj 1
- 02. Puinj 2
- 03. Map 1
- 04. Map 2
- 05. Wambip 1
- 06. Imila
- 07. Melant
- 08. Humbura 1
- 09. Humbura 2
- 10. Tulum 1
- 11. Tulum 2
- 12. Posulim
- 13. Pembi
- 14. Kusi
- 15. Pingirip
- 16. Semb Marep 1
- 17. Marep 2
- 18. Paip
- 19. Mulim
- 20. Heip
- 21. Bela
- 22. Kamberep
- 23. Was 1
- 24. Was 2
- 25. Topa
- 26. Hum
