= Pomutu/Kurti/Andra Rural LLG =

Local-level government in Papua New Guinea

Pomutu-Ndrehet Kurti-Andra Rural LLG
- Country: Papua New Guinea
- Province: Manus Province
- Time zone: UTC+10 (AEST)

Pomutu/Kurti/Andra Rural LLG is a local-level government (LLG) of Manus Province, Papua New Guinea.

== Wards ==
- 01. Ponam
- 02. Tulu 1
- 03. Tulu 2
- 04. Lahapau
- 05. Bundralis C/Mssn
- 06. Lehewa
- 07. Saha
- 08. N'drehet
- 09. Liap
- 10. Derimbat
- 11. Andra Island
- 12. Souh
- 13. Mundrau
- 14. Patlok
- 15. Mundripureu
- 16. Pundru
- 17. Wamandra
- 18. Ndrumunun
