= Nebilyer Rural LLG =

Local-level government in Papua New Guinea

- Location within Papua New Guinea
- Coordinates: 6.065209°S 144.173738°E
- Country: Papua New Guinea
- Province: Western Highlands Province
- Time zone: UTC+10 (AEST)

Nebilyer Rural LLG is a local-level government (LLG) of Western Highlands Province, Papua New Guinea.

== Wards ==
- 01. Pabarabuk
- 02. Papikola
- 03. Oamul
- 04. Kupeng
- 05. Kogmul
- 06. Malda
- 07. Teka 1
- 08. Teka 2
- 09. Kumbaia
- 10. Koibuka
- 11. Yumbiga 1
- 12. Yumbiga 2
- 13. Kaige 1
- 14. Kaige 2
- 15. Iriwaipa
- 16. Gomi
- 17. Tapia
- 18. Korkor
- 19. Paraka
- 20. Alimp 1
- 21. Alimp 2
- 22. Kumumbaga
- 23. Wagil
- 24. Agega
- 25. Olk
- 26. Koibuga
- 27. Pangatibuk
- 28. Dumakona
- 29. Kongra
- 30. Kend
- 31. Arowa
- 32. Wairipi
- 33. Keranum
- 34. Kongmul
