= Poroma Rural LLG =

Local-level government in Papua New Guinea

- Location within Papua New Guinea
- Coordinates: 6.312147°S 143.633198°E
- Country: Papua New Guinea
- Province: Southern Highlands Province
- Time zone: UTC+10 (AEST)

Poroma Rural LLG is a local-level government (LLG) of Southern Highlands Province, Papua New Guinea.

== Wards ==
- 01. Kongu
- 02. Tindom 2
- 03. Mondisarep
- 04. Kar
- 05. Utupia
- 06. Undu Kopa
- 07. Farata
- 08. Kusa
- 09. Det
- 10. Onja-Rundu
- 11. Waramesa
- 12. ombadi
- 13. Kapit/Kum 11
- 14. Purtre/Kum 12
- 15. Wanga
- 16. Mato
- 17. Nenja
- 18. Poroma Station
- 19. Kupipi
- 20. Poroma
- 21. Toiwaro
- 22. Tamenda
- 23. Kunjulu
- 26. Kar 11
