= Mosa Rural LLG =

Local-level government in Papua New Guinea

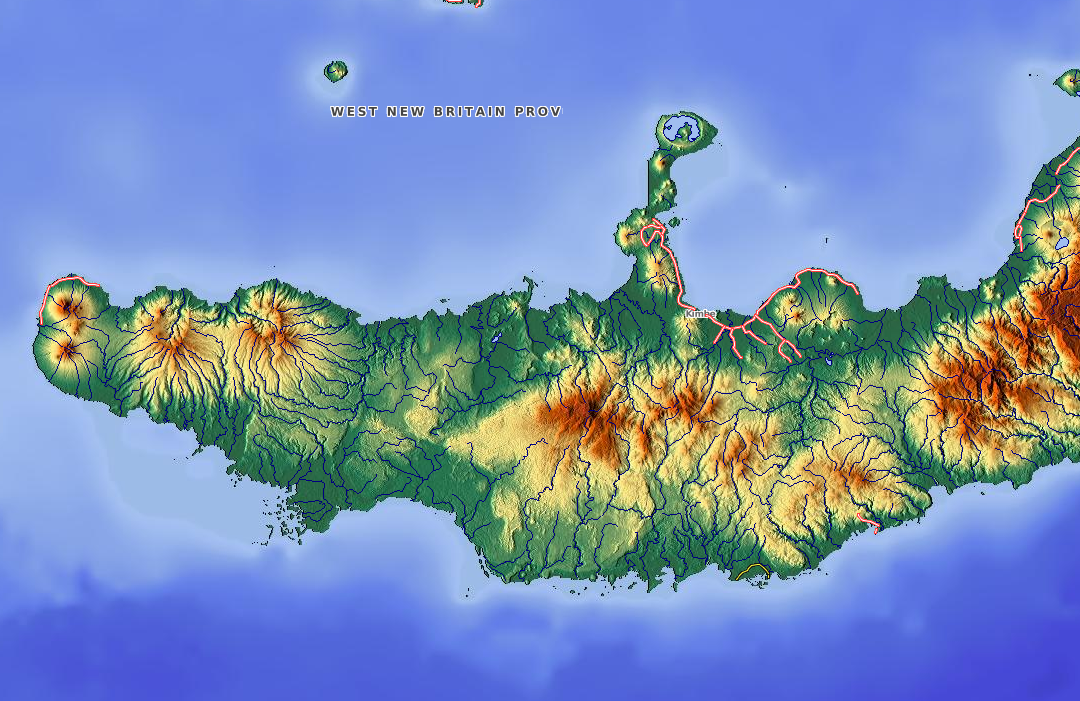
- Location within Papua New Guinea
- Coordinates: 5.626408°S 150.237622°E
- Country: Papua New Guinea
- Province: West New Britain Province
- Time zone: UTC+10 (AEST)

Mosa Rural LLG is a local-level government (LLG) of West New Britain Province, Papua New Guinea.

== Wards ==
- 01. Gamapili
- 02. Bugal
- 03. Kavui
- 04. Gaopore
- 05. Laheri
- 06. Bebere
- 07. Tamba
- 08. Sarakolok
- 86. Mosa Urban
