= Kandrian Coastal Rural LLG =

Local-level government in Papua New Guinea

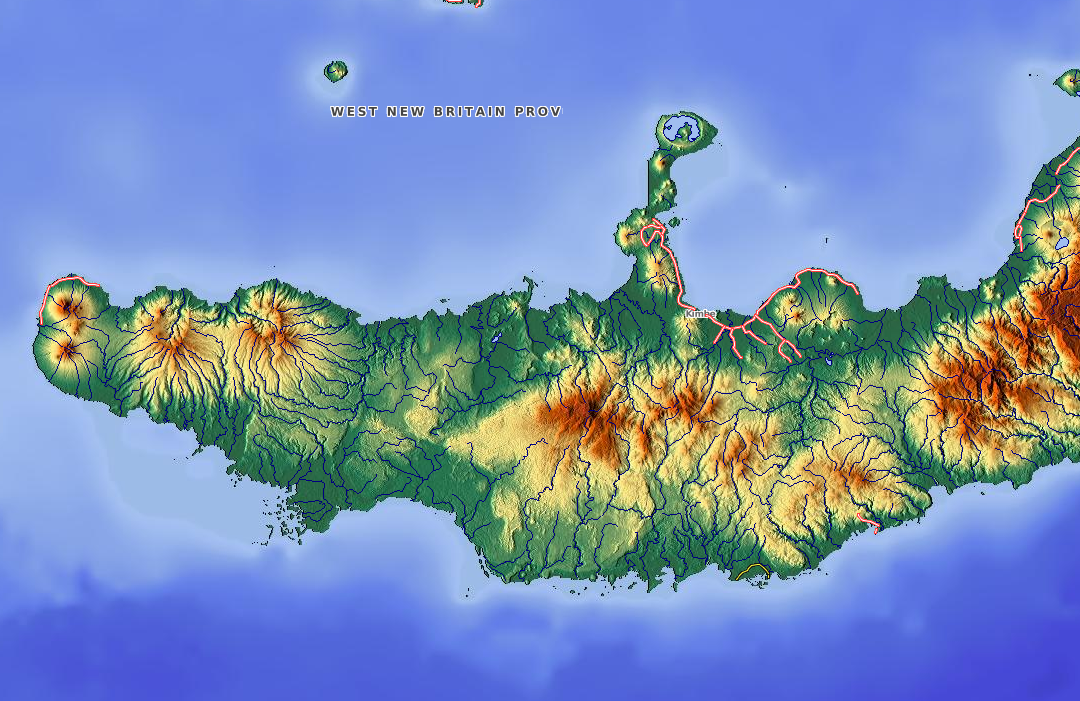
- Location within Papua New Guinea
- Coordinates: 6.20531°S 149.552°E
- Country: Papua New Guinea
- Province: West New Britain Province
- Time zone: UTC+10 (AEST)

Kandrian Coastal Rural LLG is a local-level government (LLG) of West New Britain Province, Papua New Guinea.

== Wards ==
- 01. Amnge
- 02. Apalik
- 03. Aeglep
- 04. Kandrian
- 05. Kaul
- 06. Loko Nambis
- 07. Ioudo
- 08. Vinum
- 09. Pilolo
- 10. Agulo
- 11. Ivangnga
- 12. Naplavui
- 81. Kandrian Urban
