= Kandrian Inland Rural LLG =

Local-level government in Papua New Guinea

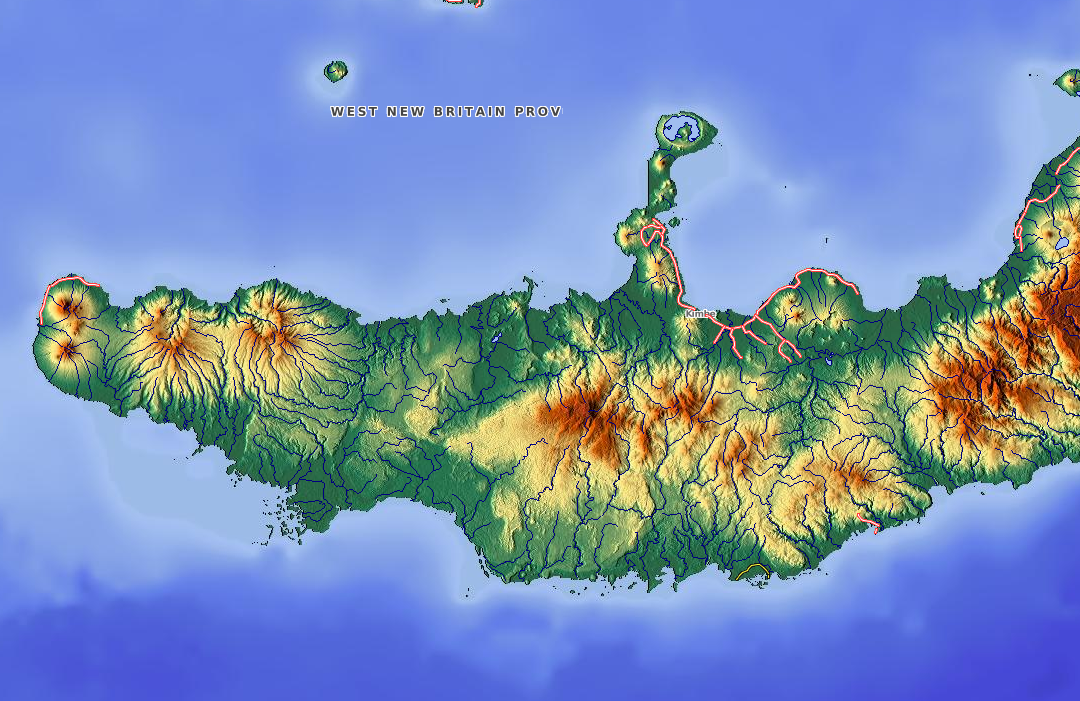
- Location within Papua New Guinea
- Coordinates: 6.2049°S 149.561°E
- Country: Papua New Guinea
- Province: West New Britain Province
- Time zone: UTC+10 (AEST)

Kandrian Inland Rural LLG is a local-level government (LLG) of West New Britain Province, Papua New Guinea.

== Wards ==
- 01. Akivru
- 02. Gogor
- 03. Loko Bush
- 04. Mulus
- 05. Miu
- 06. Avet
- 07. Awon
- 08. Amumsong
- 09. Palan
- 10. Asengseng
- 11. Ngolu
