= Umi/Atzera Rural LLG =

Local-level government in Papua New Guinea

- Location within Papua New Guinea
- Country: Papua New Guinea
- Province: Morobe Province
- Time zone: UTC+10 (AEST)

Umi/Atzera Rural LLG is a local-level government (LLG) of Morobe Province, Papua New Guinea.

== Wards ==
- 01. Ragiampun
- 02. Waritzian
- 03. Watarais
- 04. Atzunas
- 05. Marawasa
- 06. Wankun
- 07. Raginam
- 08. Rumpa
- 09. Yanuf
- 10. Numbugu
- 11. Ngarutzaniang
- 12. Samaran
- 13. Zumara
- 14. Mayamzariang
- 15. Tofmora
- 16. Arifiran
- 17. Dabu
- 18. Zumim
- 19. Antiragen
- 20. Gandisap
- 21. Sauruan
- 22. Marangits
- 23. Marangints
- 24. Mangiang
- 25. Binimamp
- 26. Nasawasiang
- 27. Sangan
- 28. Wafibampun
- 29. Zumangurun
- 30. Mutzing Station
