= Tsak Rural LLG =

Local-level government in Papua New Guinea

Tsak Rural LLG Tsak Valley
- Country: Papua New Guinea
- Province: Enga Province
- Time zone: UTC+10 (AEST)

Tsak Rural LLG is a local-level government (LLG) of Enga Province, Papua New Guinea. The Tsak Valley has population of over 20,000 people, with most of them depending on subsistence farming. Tsak Valley has four big tribes: The Waimin tribe, the Paukak tribe, the Yambaran tribe and the Sikin tribe which are further divided into sub tribes. There are other smaller tribes too.

Tsak is a place of cultural significance. Enga’s Te’e (Trade) originated in Tsak Valley. The Adventist Mission first arrived in the village of Alumanda in Tsak before it spread out to the rest of Enga. Tsak in Enga language means “to live or alive.”

Pitipais RMCN Secondary School is the only high school serving the population. The other nearest high schools are Wapenamanda Foursquare Secondary School and St Paul’s Lutheran Secondary School in the Wapenamanda area. Tsak Rural LLG also hosts the Kungumanda Foursquare Community Health Workers Training School. Tsak Raiakam Lutheran Primary School situated in the centre of the valley is the biggest primary school in the LLG.

Members of the Tsak community are characterized by hospitable and welcoming social behaviors toward visitors.

== Wards ==
- 01. Pipites
- 02. Sapos
- 03. Komanda
- 04. Yogos
- 05. Tangaimanda
- 06. Kiangapu/Kiangapumanda & Indis
- 07. Pumakos
- 08. Raiakam
- 09. Alumanda
- 10. Poketamanda
- 11. Ipali
- 12. Imangapos
- 13. Sapundis
- 14. Pitipais
- 15. Wanimas
- 16. Londol
- 17. Kwia
- 18. Angimanda
- 19. Yangimanda
