= Ambum Rural LLG =

Local-level government in Papua New Guinea

- Country: Papua New Guinea
- Province: Enga Province
- Time zone: UTC+10 (AEST)

Ambum Rural LLG is a local-level government (LLG) of Enga Province, Papua New Guinea.

== Wards ==
- 01. Par
- 02. Lakapos
- 03. Yampu
- 04. Tialipos
- 05. Aiametes
- 06. Talemanda
- 07. Palimbi
- 08. Pandai
- 09. Kasi
- 10. Lakui
- 11. Lakamanda
- 12. Sikiro
- 13. Sikiro Catholic Mission
- 14. Anditale 1
- 15. Anditale 2
- 16. Omain
- 17. Monokam
- 18. Tongem
- 19. Kupin
- 20. Kanomares
- 21. Kambus
- 22. Londor
- 23. Elakale
- 24. Penei (Lailam)
- 25. Yarulama
