= Kotna Rural LLG =

Local-level government in Papua New Guinea

- Country: Papua New Guinea
- Province: Western Highlands Province
- Time zone: UTC+10 (AEST)

Kotna Rural LLG is a local-level government (LLG) of Western Highlands Province, Papua New Guinea.

== Wards ==
- 35. Nunga 2
- 37. Keremunga
- 38. Romonga
- 41. Keya
- 43. Bengel
- 44. Kembuki
- 45. Kurunga
- 46. Rang
- 48. Rulna
- 49. Minjim
- 50. Kentkina
- 51. Rombanga
