= Suai Rural LLG =

Local-level government in Papua New Guinea

Suai Rural LLG Suwai Rural LLG
- Country: Papua New Guinea
- Province: Chimbu Province
- Time zone: UTC+10 (AEST)

Suai Rural LLG (also known as Suwai Rural LLG) is a local-level government (LLG) of Chimbu Province, Papua New Guinea.

== Wards ==
1. Dugul
2. Oglew/Aula
3. Bomaiku
4. Du 1
5. Du 2
6. Du 3
7. Kreku/Sipaku
8. Aniku
9. Kreku/Korul
10. Niniku
11. Piga
12. Kagle
13. Digakane
14. Kumankane
15. Au/Erakane
16. Kagul
17. Yoruaku
18. Mau/Emre
19. Kuiam
20. Maribebi-Kui
21. Kebil 1
22. Kebil2
23. Kebai Ubanidiawa(Blue Mountain)
