= Pobuma Rural LLG =

Local-level government in Papua New Guinea

- Country: Papua New Guinea
- Province: Manus Province
- Time zone: UTC+10 (AEST)

Pobuma Rural LLG is a local-level government (LLG) of Manus Province, Papua New Guinea.

== Wards ==
- 01. M'buke/Whal
- 02. Bundrahei/Sabondralis
- 03. Likum
- 04. Babun
- 05. Butjou
- 06. Timoenai
- 07. Pohowadeyaha
- 08. Jekal
- 09. Peli Patu
