= Wapi Rural LLG =

Local-level government in Papua New Guinea

Wapi Rural LLG Hingwiqa
- Location within Papua New Guinea
- Coordinates: 7.239574°S 146.06535°E
- Country: Papua New Guinea
- Province: Morobe Province
- Time zone: UTC+10 (AEST)

Wapi Rural LLG is a local-level government (LLG) of Morobe Province, Papua New Guinea.

== Wards ==
- 01. Watama
- 02. Hanjua
- 03. Wauwoka
- 04. Womei
- 05. Tamoi
- 06. Yakepa
- 07. Akwanja
- 08. Topa
- 09. Mabukapa
- 10. Aiyogi
- 11. Sikwong 1
- 12. Sikwong 2
- 13. Kapini
- 14. Himerka
- 15. Gebgya
