= Hoskins Rural LLG =

Local-level government in Papua New Guinea

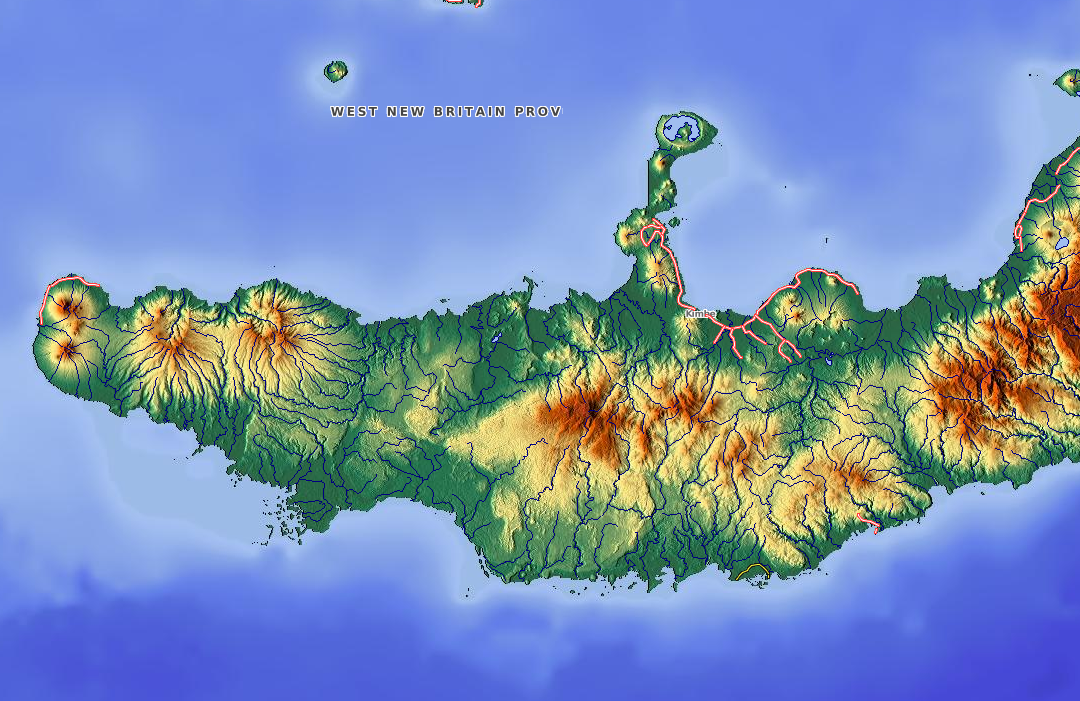
- Location within Papua New Guinea
- Coordinates: 5.45183°S 150.405°E
- Country: Papua New Guinea
- Province: West New Britain Province
- Time zone: UTC+10 (AEST)

Hoskins Rural LLG is a local-level government (LLG) of West New Britain Province, Papua New Guinea.

== Wards ==
- 01. Garua
- 02. Kwalakesi
- 03. Hoskins
- 04. Kalu
- 05. Valoka
- 06. Rikau/Siki
- 07. Kagagu
- 08. Malala
- 09. Pokili
