= Mount Hagen Urban LLG =

Local-level government in Papua New Guinea

- Country: Papua New Guinea
- Province: Western Highlands Province
- Time zone: UTC+10 (AEST)

Mount Hagen Urban LLG is a local-level government (LLG) of Western Highlands Province, Papua New Guinea.

== Wards ==
- 81. Kagamuga Urban
- 83. Mt. Hagen Town
