= Makamaka Rural LLG =

Local-level government in Papua New Guinea

- Location within Papua New Guinea
- Coordinates: 9.710°S 149.588°E
- Country: Papua New Guinea
- Province: Milne Bay Province
- Time zone: UTC+10 (AEST)

Makamaka Rural LLG is a local-level government (LLG) of Milne Bay Province, Papua New Guinea.

== Wards ==
- 01. Bai'awa
- 02. Midino
- 03. Iarame
- 04. Pem
- 05. Magabara
- 06. Tapio
- 07. Mukawa
- 08. Bogaboga
- 09. Ginada
- 10. Irikaba
- 11. Wabubu
- 12. Dabora
- 13. Banapa
- 14. Menapi
- 15. Pora
- 16. Abuaro
- 17. Giwa
- 18. Koiyabagira
- 19. Kwagila
- 20. Biniguni
- 21. Wapon
- 22. Borovia
- 23. Pumani
- 24. Bemberi
- 25. Gurukwaia
- 26. Mapouna
