= Lower Wage Rural LLG =

Local-level government in Papua New Guinea

Lower Wage Rural LLG of Magarima Electrorate
- Location within Papua New Guinea
- Coordinates: 5.673°S 143.297°E
- Country: Papua New Guinea
- Province: Hela Province
- Time zone: UTC+10 (AEST)

Lower Wage Rural LLG a local-level government (LLG) of [Magarima District] in Hela Province, Papua New Guinea.

== Wards ==
- 01. Hombola
- 01. Sebiba
- 02. Wabal
- 03. Henep
- 04. Ombal
- 05. Songura
- 06. Solapaem
- 07. Kapendaka
- 08. Mabera
- 09. Weya
- 10. Waip
- 11. Mariste
- 12. Hiri
- 13. Olaem
- 14. Posora
- 15. Yambaraka
- 16. Wabulaka
- 17. Olaem
- 18. Pingi
- 19. Hone
- 20. Keme
