= Wabag Rural LLG =

Local-level government in Papua New Guinea

- Country: Papua New Guinea
- Province: Enga Province
- Time zone: UTC+10 (AEST)

Wabag Rural LLG is a local-level government (LLG) of Enga Province, Papua New Guinea.

== Wards ==
- 01. Tukusanda
- 02. Aipanda
- 03. Tambitanis
- 04. Lakolam
- 05. Kupalis
- 06. Nandi
- 07. Sakarip
- 08. Sopas
- 09. Kiwi
- 10. Kaiap
- 11. Kamas
- 12. Kopen
- 13. Sari
- 14. Tore
- 15. Teremanda
- 16. Aipinamanda
- 17. Lakemanda
- 18. Sakales
- 19. Keas
- 20. Irelya
- 21. Wakumare
- 22. Lenki
- 23. Ainumanda
- 24. Rakamanda
- 25. Yokomanda
- 26. Imi
- 27. We'e
- 28. Birip
- 29. Akom
- 30. Lukirap
- 31. Waimerimanda
- 32. Lakopen
- 33. Yailingis
- 34. Tumbilam
- 35. Aiyokolam
- 36. Keas
- 37. Komaites
- 38. Kiwi No.2
- 39. Amala
- 40. Manjope
- 41. Pandam
- 42. Wanomanda
- 43. Makapumanda
- 44. Yokota
- 45. Pealam
