= Anglimp Rural LLG =

Local-level government in Papua New Guinea

- Location within Papua New Guinea
- Coordinates: 5.830716°S 144.413297°E
- Country: Papua New Guinea
- Province: Jiwaka Province
- Time zone: UTC+10 (AEST)

Anglimp Rural LLG is a local-level government (LLG) of Jiwaka Province, Papua New Guinea.

== Wards ==
1. Kaip 1
2. Kaip 2
3. Kaip 3
4. Polga 1
5. Polga 2
6. Wurup 1
7. Wurup 2
8. Wurup 3
9. Wurup 4
10. Kiliga 1
11. Kiliga 2
12. Ulya
13. Kuki Kipan
14. Panga
15. Kutubugl 1
16. Komon
17. Kutubugl 2
18. Ketepung 1
19. Ketepung 2
20. Rogomp 1
21. Rogomp 2
22. Ketepam 1
23. Ketepam 2
24. Ketepam 3
25. Rukraka
26. Papen
27. Kindeng 1
28. Kindeng 2
29. Mugamamp
30. Mandan
31. Avi 1
32. Avi 2
33. Dopdop 1
34. Dopdop 2
35. Dopdop 3
36. Dopdop 4
