= Rabaul Urban LLG =

Local-level government in Papua New Guinea

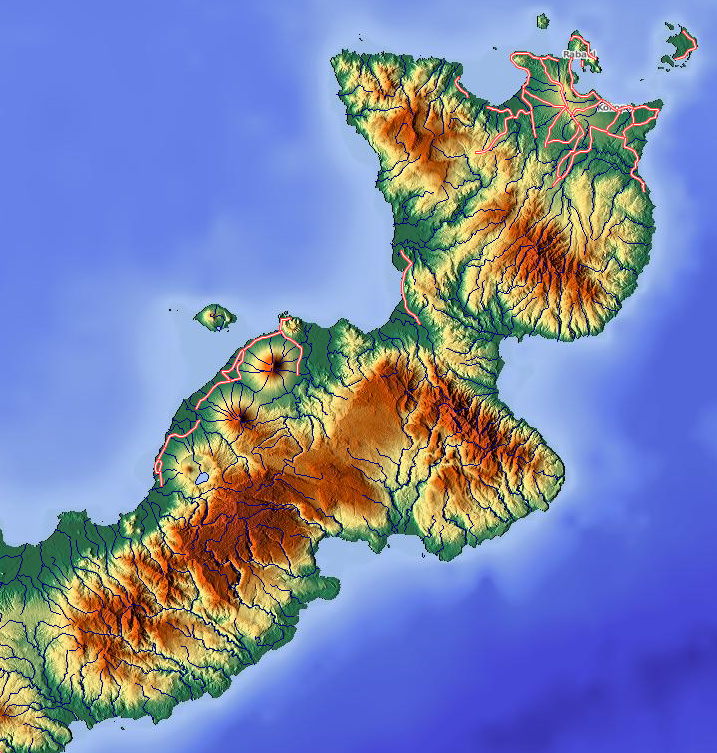
- Location within Papua New Guinea
- Coordinates: 4.19762°S 152.177883°E
- Country: Papua New Guinea
- Province: East New Britain Province
- Time zone: UTC+10 (AEST)

Rabaul Urban LLG is a local-level government (LLG) of East New Britain Province, Papua New Guinea.

== Wards ==
- 81. Rabaul Town
