= Mount Hagen Rural LLG =

Local-level government in Papua New Guinea

- Country: Papua New Guinea
- Province: Western Highlands Province
- Time zone: UTC+10 (AEST)

Mount Hagen Rural LLG is a local-level government (LLG) of Western Highlands Province, Papua New Guinea.

== Wards ==
- 01. Kumunga
- 02. Kiliga
- 03. Kelua 2
- 04. Kuguma
- 05. Kelua 1
- 06. Kik
- 07. Tega
- 08. Koglamp
- 09. Tiling
- 10. Kingalrui 1
- 11. Korobuk
- 12. Biaprui
- 13. Keltiga
- 14. Gabina
- 15. Palim 2
- 16. Palim 1
- 17. Koge 1
- 18. Koge 2
- 19. Minimp
- 20. Ogelbeng
- 21. Anga
- 22. Pulgimp
- 23. Mulga
- 24. Kitiga
- 25. Pungaminga
- 26. Kogmul
- 27. Pits
- 28. Togoba No.1
- 29. Kagamuga
- 30. Kingaldui 2
- 31. Baisu
- 32. Wimbuka
- 33. Kilam
- 34. Kenta
- 35. Koibuga
- 36. Kagamuga Rural
- 37. Kugl
- 38. Waninga
- 39. Kuguramp
- 40. Togoba 2
