= Onga/Waffa Rural LLG =

Local-level government in Papua New Guinea

- Location within Papua New Guinea
- Coordinates: 6.382812°S 146.190759°E
- Country: Papua New Guinea
- Province: Morobe Province
- Time zone: UTC+10 (AEST)

Onga/Waffa Rural LLG is a local-level government (LLG) of Morobe Province, Papua New Guinea.

== Wards ==
- 01. Tapakainantu
- 02. Imane
- 03. Kusing
- 04. Siaga
- 05. Tumbuna
- 06. Ngarowain
- 07. Guruf
- 08. Itsingants
- 09. Antir
- 10. Intoap
- 11. Wampul/Miril/Umisuan
- 12. Singas / Awan Singas
- 13. Onga
