= Fayantina Rural LLG =

Local-level government in Papua New Guinea

- Location within Papua New Guinea
- Coordinates: 6.33°S 145.54°E
- Country: Papua New Guinea
- Province: Eastern Highlands Province
- Time zone: UTC+10 (AEST)

District map of Eastern Highlands Province

Fayantina Rural LLG is a local-level government (LLG) of Eastern Highlands Province, Papua New Guinea.

== Wards ==
- 01. Yate
- 02. Kuru
- 03. Yameve
- 04. Kripave
- 05. Faiyantina
- 06. Nunofi
- 07. Fore
- 08. Kuana
- 09. Numuyagave
- 10. Krebave
- 11. Kofionka
