= West Yangoru Rural LLG =

Local-level government in Papua New Guinea

West Yangoru Rural
- LLG
- Country: Papua New Guinea
- Province: East Sepik Province
- Time zone: UTC+10 (AEST)

West Yangoru Rural LLG is a local-level government (LLG) of East Sepik Province, Papua New Guinea.

== Wards ==
- 01. Kumun
- 02. Kumbuhun
- 03. Wihun (Boinam)
- 04. Himbruolye/Buki
- 05. Alisu
- 06. Bonahitam
- 07. Koboibus
- 08. Yabamunu
- 09. Kuragumun
- 10. Bukitu
- 11. Wingei 1
- 12. Wingei 2
- 13. Bepandu
- 14. Yekingen & Belmo
- 15. Sara
- 16. Holik
- 17. Nindibolye
- 18. Kwaian
- 19. Duningi
- 20. Miambauru
- 21. Nambari
- 22. Malapaem
- 23. Ilipaem
- 24. Guningi
- 25. Nimbihu
