= Waiye Rural LLG =

Local-level government in Papua New Guinea

- Country: Papua New Guinea
- Province: Chimbu Province
- Time zone: UTC+10 (AEST)

Waiye Rural LLG is a local-level government (LLG) of Chimbu Province, Papua New Guinea.

== Wards ==
1. Kupau
2. Pari
3. Kurumugl
4. Nogoma
5. Koglai
6. Anigl
7. Guo
8. Wandi
9. Yuagle/Mindima Camp
10. Mindima
11. Gor
12. Gor
13. Koroma
14. Nogar
15. Nogar
16. Dingile
17. Kondo
