= Members of the National Parliament of Papua New Guinea, 1992–1997 =

This is a list of members of the National Parliament of Papua New Guinea from 1992 to 1997, as elected at the 1992 election.

Member	Party	Electorate	Province
Herowa Agiwa	People's Progress Party	Koroba-Lake Kopiago Open	Southern Highlands
Yimbal Aipe	Independent	North Waghi Open	Western Highlands
Judah Akesim	Pangu Party	Ambunti-Dreikikir Open	East Sepik
Yamandi Amos	Independent	Nawae Open	Morobe
Godfried Andupa	Melanesian Alliance Party	Middle Ramu Open	Madang
Vincent Auali	People's Democratic Movement	Tambul-Nebilyer Open	Western Highlands
Moi Avei	People's Action Party	Kairuku-Hiri Open	Central
Yaip Avini	Pangu Party	Finschhafen Open	Morobe
Andrew Baing	People's Progress Party	Markham Open	Morobe
Jeffery Balakau	Independent	Enga Provincial	Enga
Peter Barter	Independent	Madang Provincial	Madang
Michael Ben	People's Progress Party	Kavieng Open	New Ireland
Bob Bubac	Pangu Party	North Fly Open	Western Province
Nappotti Buru	Independent	Vanimo-Green River Open	West Sepik
Sir Julius Chan	People's Progress Party	Namatanai Open	New Ireland
Joseph Egilio	Independent	Central Bougainville Open	Bougainville
William Ekip Wii	Independent	Anglimp-South Waghi Open	Western Highlands
Philemon Embel	People's Democratic Movement	Nipa-Kutubu Open	Southern Highlands
Camillo Esef	Pangu Party	Goilala Open	Central
Roy Evara	Independent	Kikori Open	Gulf
Peter Gaige	Independent	Obura-Wonenara Open	Eastern Highlands
Peter Garong (Note: Tewae-Siassi Open MP Peter Garong resigned in 1992 while facing dismissal by a leadership tribunal. Soling Zeming won the resulting by-election in 1993.)	Pangu Party	Tewae-Siassi Open	Morobe
Jack Genia (Note: Abau Open MP Jack Genia died in July 1993. His brother, Kilroy Genia, won the resulting by-election in October 1993.)	Pangu Party	Abau Open	Central
Kilroy Genia	Pangu Party	Abau Open	Central
Sowa Gunia	Melanesian Alliance Party	Daulo Open	Eastern Highlands
Chris Haiveta	Independent	Gulf Provincial	Gulf
Masket Iangalio	People's Democratic Movement	Wapenamanda Open	Enga
Mathias Ijape	Independent	Goroka Open	Eastern Highlands
Aita Ivarato	People's Democratic Movement	Eastern Highlands Provincial	Eastern Highlands
Alfred Kaiabe (Note: The National Court declared the election of Komo-Magarima Open MP Balus Libe to be void in April 1994. A by-election was held in October 1994, but in November 1995 the National Court declared the by-election result void. Alfred Kaiabe won a second by-election in March 1996.)		Komo-Magarima Open	Southern Highlands
John Jaminan	People's Democratic Movement	Yangoru-Saussia Open	East Sepik
John Kamb	People's Action Party	Kerowagi Open	Chimbu
John Kanadi	Liberal Party	Esa'ala Open	Milne Bay
John Kaputin	Independent	Rabaul Open	East New Britain
Mathias Karani	National Party	Lufa Open	Eastern Highlands
Albert Karo	People's Democratic Movement	Moresby South Open	NCD
Simon Kaumi	Independent	Ijivitari Open	Northern
Albert Kipalan	People's Progress Party	Wabag Open	Enga
Francis Koimanrea	Independent	East New Britain Provincial	East New Britain
Alois Koki	People's Democratic Movement	Pomio Open	East New Britain
Nakikus Konga	Pangu Party	Gazelle Open	East New Britain
Tom Koraea	Independent	Kerema Open	Gulf
Bitan Kuok	Independent	Middle Fly Open	Western Province
Michael Laimo	Independent	South Bougainville Open	Bougainville
Philip Laki	Pangu Party	Angoram Open	East Sepik
Galen Lang (Note: Sumkar Open MP Galen Lang resigned in 1992 to avoid pending leadership tribunal charges. Peter Yama won the resulting by-election in December 1992.)	Pangu Party	Sumkar Open	Madang
Iairo Lasaro	People's Democratic Movement	Alotau Open	Milne Bay
Balus Libe	Melanesian Alliance Party	Komo-Magarima Open	Southern Highlands
Patterson Lowa	Melanesian Alliance Party	Talasea Open	West New Britain
Sir Pita Lus	Pangu Party	Maprik Open	East Sepik
David Mai	Independent	Chimbu Provincial	Chimbu
Castan Maibawa	Independent	Okapa Open	Eastern Highlands
Paul Mambei	People's Progress Party	Aitape-Lumi Open	West Sepik
Arnold Marsipal	Pangu Party	Manus Provincial	Manus
Tukape Masani	Independent	Huon Gulf Open	Morobe
Kevin Masive	People's Progress Party	Unggai-Bena Open	Eastern Highlands
Fr John Momis	Melanesian Alliance Party	Bougainville Provincial	Bougainville
Beona Motawiya	People's Action Party	Kiriwina-Goodenough Open	Milne Bay
Dick Mune	People's Action Party	Southern Highlands Provincial	Southern Highlands
Robert Nagle	Independent	Baiyer-Mul Open	Western Highlands
Jerry Nalau	Pangu Party	Morobe Provincial	Morobe
Michael Nali	Independent	Mendi Open	Southern Highlands
Rabbie Namaliu	Pangu Party	Kokopo Open	East New Britain
Samson Napo	Independent	Bulolo Open	Morobe
Bernard Narokobi	Melanesian Alliance Party	Wewak Open	East Sepik
Bob Netin	Independent	Telefomin Open	West Sepik
Tim Neville	Independent	Milne Bay Provincial	Milne Bay
John Nilkare	League for National Advancement	Gumine Open	Chimbu
Michael Ogio	People's Democratic Movement	North Bougainville Open	Bougainville
Kerenga Okoro	Independent	Sinasina-Yonggamugl Open	Chimbu
Joseph Onguglo	Black Action Party	Kundiawa Open	Chimbu
John Orea	People's Action Party	Central Provincial	Central
Anton Pakena	Independent	Lagaip Porgera Open	Enga
Samuel Pariwa	League for National Advancement	Rai Coast Open	Madang
Thomas Pelika	League for National Advancement	Menyamya Open	Morobe
Melchior Pep	Pangu Party	Dei Open	Western Highlands
Bart Philemon	Independent	Lae Open	Morobe
Titus Philemon	People's Progress Party	Samarai-Murua Open	Milne Bay
Stanley Pil	Independent	Madang Open	Madang
Stephen Pokawin (Note: Manus Open MP Martin Thompson died in 1995. Stephen Pokawin won the resulting by-election in May 1996.)	Movement for Greater Autonomy	Manus Provincial	Manus
Paul Pora	Independent	Hagen Open	Western Highlands
Andrew Posai	People's Progress Party	Kandrian-Gloucester Open	West New Britain
John Pundari	Independent	Kompiam Ambum Open	Enga
Yauwe Riyong	League for National Advancement	Chuave Open	Chimbu
Christopher Sambre	Pangu Party	Nuku Open	West Sepik
Ginson Saonu	Independent	Kabwum Open	Morobe
Jimson Sauk	People's Democratic Movement	Kandep Open	Enga
Viviso Seravo	Independent	Henganofi Open	Eastern Highlands
Bill Skate	National Party	Nat. Capital District Provincial	NCD
Sylvanes Siembo	Independent	Northern Provincial	Northern
Sir Michael Somare	Pangu Party	East Sepik Provincial	East Sepik
Robert Suckling	People's Action Party	Moresby North West Open	NCD
Kimb Tai	Independent	Jimi Open	Western Highlands
Avusi Tanao	People's Democratic Movement	Kainantu Open	Eastern Highlands
John Tekwie	People's Action Party	West Sepik Provincial	West Sepik
Anthony Temo	People's Action Party	Imbonggu Open	Southern Highlands
Martin Thompson	League for National Advancement	Manus Open	Manus
Paul Tohian	Independent	New Ireland Provincial	New Ireland
Daniel Tulapi	People's Action Party	Kagua-Erave Open	Southern Highlands
David Unagi	Independent	Moresby North East Open	NCD
John Waiko	People's Action Party	Sohe Open	Northern
Lucas Waka	Pangu Party	West New Britain Provincial	West New Britain
Dere Wamaro	People's Action Party	Western Provincial	Western
George Wan	People's Progress Party	Usino Bundi Open	Madang
Paul Wanjik	Pangu Party	Wosera-Gawi Open	East Sepik
Tim Ward	People's Democratic Movement	Bogia Open	Madang
Paias Wingti	People's Democratic Movement	Western Highlands Provincial	Western Highlands
Dibara Yagabo	Independent	Rigo Open	Central
Mathew Yago	Melanesian Alliance Party	Tari Open	Southern Highlands
Roy Yaki	People's Democratic Movement	Ialibu-Pangia Open	Southern Highlands
Peter Yama	People's Progress Party	Madang Provincial	Madang
Philip Yomo	Independent	Karimui-Nomane Open	Chimbu
Parry Zeipi	People's Action Party	South Fly Open	Western
Soling Zeming (Note: Tewae-Siassi Open MP Soling Zeming died in 1995. His brother, Mao Zeming, won the resulting by-election in July 1995.)	Independent	Tewae-Siassi Open	Morobe
Mao Zeming	Independent	Tewae-Siassi Open	Morobe
