= Members of the National Parliament of Papua New Guinea, 1997–2002 =

Parliament members Papua New Guinea 1997-2002

This is a list of members of the National Parliament of Papua New Guinea from 1997 to 2002, as elected at the 1997 election.

| Member | Party | Electorate | Province | Term in office |
|---|---|---|---|---|
| Josephine Abaijah | Independent | Milne Bay Provincial | Milne Bay | 1977–1982, 1997–2002 |
| Anderson Agiru | Independent | Southern Highlands Provincial | Southern Highlands | 1997–2002, 2007–2016 |
| Herowa Agiwa | People's Progress Party | Koroba-Lake Kopiago Open | Southern Highlands | 1992–1993, 1997–2002 |
| Judah Akesim | Pangu Party | Ambunti-Dreikikir Open | East Sepik | 1989–2002 |
| Sam Akoitai | Independent | Central Bougainville Open | Bougainville | 1997–2007 |
| Fr Louis Ambane (Note: The Supreme Court declared the election of Chimbu Provincial MP Louis Ambane to be void on 5 October 1998. Ambane won the resulting by-election in 1999.) | Independent | Chimbu Provincial | Chimbu | 1997–1998, 1999–2003 |
| Ephraim Apelis | National Alliance Party | Namatanai Open | New Ireland | 1997–2002 |
| Peter Arul | Independent | Kandrian-Gloucester Open | West New Britain | 1997–2002 |
| Vincent Auali | People's Democratic Movement | Tambul-Nebilyer Open | Western Highlands | 1992–2002 |
| Moi Avei | Pangu Party | Kairuku-Hiri Open | Central | 1992–2007 |
| Yaip Avini (Note: In July 1997, Finschhafen Open MP Yaip Avini lost a Supreme Court appeal against a November 1996 criminal conviction for misappropriation and was sentenced to eight years in prison. He had been permitted to recontest his seat at the 1997 election two weeks before due to his outstanding appeal. Alfred Pogo won the resulting by-election in September 1998.) | People's Progress Party | Finschhafen Open | Morobe | 1992–1997 |
| Andrew Baing | People's Progress Party | Markham Open | Morobe | 1992–2006 |
| David Basua (Note: The National Court declared the election of Wabag Open MP David Basua to be void on 30 June 1999. A by-election was held in March 1999, and Charles Miru Luta, the successful petitioner against Basua, was declared to have been elected on 28 March. Basua lodged a petition against the by-election result, and on 16 July 1999 the National Court invalidated Luta's election, and mandated a recount including ballot boxes left out of the original tally. Basua was subsequently declared the winner of the recount and declared elected.) | National Alliance Party | Kagua-Erave Open | Southern Highlands | 1997–1998, 1999–2007 |
| Charlie Benjamin | Independent | Manus Open | Manus | 1997–present |
| Ajax Bia | Independent | Goilala Open | Central | 1997–2002 |
| Sinai Brown (Note: Gazelle Open MP Nakikus Konga resigned in 2000. Sinai Brown won the resulting by-election in July 2000.) | National Alliance Party | Gazelle Open | East New Britain | 2000–2007 |
| Leo Dion (Note: Pomio Open MP Alois Koki died in August 2000. Francis Koimanrea, Koki's brother and the member for East New Britain Provincial, resigned his own seat to contest the resulting by-election, which he won in December 2000. Leo Dion won the simultaneous by-election for Koimanrea's old seat.) | National Alliance Party | East New Britain Provincial | East New Britain | 2000–2017 |
| Ted Diro | People's Action Party | Central Provincial | Central | 1982–1991, 1997–2002 |
| Gabriel Dusava (Note: Yangoru-Saussia Open MP Gabriel Dusava was dismissed by a leadership tribunal on 17 October 1997 for misconduct in his prior role of Foreign Affairs Secretary. Dusava unsuccessfully appealed, and in 2000 Bernard Hagoria was declared to have been elected without a by-election following a recount of votes from the 1997 election.) | Independent | Yangoru-Saussia Open | East Sepik | 1997 |
| William Ebenosi | People's National Congress | Kiriwina-Goodenough Open | Milne Bay | 1997–2002 |
| Philemon Embel | People's Progress Party | Nipa-Kutubu Open | Southern Highlands | 1987–2002, 2007–2012 |
| Gabia Gagarimabu | United Party | South Fly Open | Western | 1997–2002 |
| Ron Ganarafo | Pangu Party | Daulo Open | Eastern Highlands | 1997–2002, 2012–2017 |
| Kilroy Genia | Pangu Party | Abau Open | Central | 1993–2002 |
| Mathew Gubag | Pangu Party | Sumkar Open | Madang | 1997–2007 |
| Bernard Hagoria | People's Democratic Movement | Yangoru-Saussia Open | East Sepik | 2000–2003 |
| Chris Haiveta | Pangu Party | Gulf Provincial | Gulf | 1992–2007, 2017–present |
| Masket Iangalio | National Alliance Party | Wapenamanda Open | Enga | 1987–2002 |
| Peter Ipatas | Independent | Enga Provincial | Enga | 1997–present |
| Alfred Kaiabe | People's Unity Party | Komo-Magarima Open | Southern Highlands | 1990–1992, 1996–2002 |
| John Kamb | People's Democratic Movement | Kerowagi Open | Chimbu | 1992–2002 |
| John Kanadi | People's Progress Party | Esa'ala Open | Milne Bay | 1992–2002 |
| Mathias Karani | People's Progress Party | Lufa Open | Eastern Highlands | 1992–2002 |
| Jim Kas (Note: Madang Provincial MP Jim Kas was dismissed from office after being found guilty of misconduct by a leadership tribunal on 27 September 2000. A by-election was not held before the 2002 election.) | Independent | Madang Provincial | Madang | 1997–2000, 2012–2017 |
| Daniel Kapi (Note: The Supreme Court declared the election of Wabag Open MP Takai Kapi to be void on 1 April 1998 as he was found to have not been enrolled in his electorate. Daniel Kapi won the resulting by-election in 1999.) | Pangu Party | Wabag Open | Enga | 1999–2002 |
| Takai Kapi | People's Democratic Movement | Wabag Open | Enga | 1997–1998 |
| Sir John Kaputin | Independent | Rabaul Open | East New Britain | 1972–2002 |
| Simon Kaumi | People's National Congress | Ijivitari Open | Northern | 1992–2002 |
| Lady Carol Kidu | Independent | Moresby South Open | NCD | 1997–2012 |
| Riddler Kimave | Pangu Party | Kikori Open | Gulf | 1997–2002 |
| Francis Koimanrea | National Alliance Party | East New Britain Provincial/ Pomio Open | East New Britain | 1992–2000, 2000–2002 |
| Alois Koki | People's Democratic Movement | Pomio Open | East New Britain | 1979–2000 |
| Nakikus Konga | Pangu Party | Gazelle Open | East New Britain | 1992–2000 |
| Sir Tom Koraea | Pangu Party | Kerema Open | Gulf | 1968–1982, 1992–2002 |
| Kuk Kuli | Independent | Anglimp-South Waghi Open | Western Highlands | 1997–2002 |
| Andrew Kumbakor | People's Democratic Movement | Nuku Open | West Sepik | 1997–2012 |
| Bitan Kuok | People's Progress Party | Middle Fly Open | Western Province | 1992–2002 |
| Damson Lafana | Independent | Unggai-Bena Open | Eastern Highlands | 1997–2002 |
| Peti Lafanama | Independent | Eastern Highlands Provincial | Eastern Highlands | 1997–2002 |
| Fr Robert Lak | Independent | Western Highlands Provincial | Western Highlands | 1997–2002 |
| Michael Laimo | Melanesian Alliance Party | South Bougainville Open | Bougainville | 1992–2008 |
| Iairo Lasaro | People's Democratic Movement | Alotau Open | Milne Bay | 1987–2002 |
| Ian Ling-Stuckey | Pangu Party | Kavieng Open | New Ireland | 1997–2007 |
| Patterson Lowa | Melanesian Alliance Party | Talasea Open | West New Britain | 1977, 1987–2002 |
| Sir Pita Lus | Pangu Party | Maprik Open | East Sepik | 1964–2002 |
| Charles Miru Luta | People's Action Party | Kagua-Erave Open | Southern Highlands | 1999 |
| Castan Maibawa | People's Progress Party | Okapa Open | Eastern Highlands | 1988–2002 |
| Norbert Makmop | Independent | Western Provincial | Western | 1997–2002 |
| Tukape Masani | People's Progress Party | Huon Gulf Open | Morobe | 1992–2002 |
| Bernard Mollok | Independent | Bogia Open | Madang | 1997–2002 |
| John Momis | Melanesian Alliance Party | Bougainville Provincial | Bougainville | 1972–2005 |
| Ludger Mond | People's Action Party | Sinasina-Yonggamugl Open | Chimbu | 1997–2002 |
| Sir Mekere Morauta | People's Democratic Movement | Moresby North West Open | NCD | 1997–2012, 2017–2020 |
| Stahl Musa | People's Action Party | Rai Coast Open | Madang | 1997–2002 |
| Robert Nagle | Pangu Party | Baiyer-Mul Open | Western Highlands | 1992–2002 |
| Clement Nakmai (Note: West New Britain Provincial MP Bernard Vogae died on 5 March 2000. Clement Nakmai won the resulting by-election.) | Independent | West New Britain Provincial | West New Britain | 2000–2007 |
| Michael Nali | People's Progress Party | Mendi Open | Southern Highlands | 1992–2007, 2017–present |
| Sir Rabbie Namaliu | Pangu Party | Kokopo Open | East New Britain | 1982–2007 |
| Samson Napo | Pangu Party | Bulolo Open | Morobe | 1992–2002 |
| Bernard Narokobi | Melanesian Alliance Party | Wewak Open | East Sepik | 1987–2002 |
| Michael Ogio | People's Democratic Movement | North Bougainville Open | Bougainville | 1987–2002, 2007–2011 |
| Opis Papo | People's Resources Awareness | Lagaip Porgera Open | Enga | 1997–2002 |
| Peter Peipul | National Alliance Party | Imbonggu Open | Southern Highlands | 1997–2002 |
| Thomas Pelika | Independent | Menyamya Open | Morobe | 1992–2002, 2017–present |
| Bart Philemon | National Alliance Party | Lae Open | Morobe | 1992–2012 |
| Titus Philemon | People's Progress Party | Samarai-Murua Open | Milne Bay | 1992–2002, 2012–2017 |
| Alfred Pogo | People's Democratic Movement | Finschhafen Open | Morobe | 1999–2002 |
| Dr Fabian Pok | Independent | North Waghi Open | Western Highlands | 1997–2002, 2012–present |
| Stephen Pokawin | Movement for Greater Autonomy | Manus Provincial | Manus | 1996–2002 |
| Paul Pora | National Party | Hagen Open | Western Highlands | 1987–2002 |
| John Pundari | Independent | Kompiam Ambum Open | Enga | 1992–2002, 2007–present |
| Baki Reipa (Note: The National Court declared the election of Kainantu Open MP Baki Reipa to be void on 17 July 1998. Reipa won the resulting by-election in July 1999.) | Independent | Kainantu Open | Eastern Highlands | 1997–1998, 1999–2002 |
| Yauwe Riyong | People's Progress Party | Chuave Open | Chimbu | 1992–1994, 1997–2002 |
| Puri Ruing | People's Resources Awareness | Dei Open | Western Highlands | 1997–2002, 2007–2012 |
| Robert Sakias | People's Action Party | Telefomin Open | West Sepik | 1997–2002 |
| Ginson Saonu | People's Progress Party | Kabwum Open | Morobe | 1992–2002, 2017–present |
| Jimson Sauk | People's Progress Party | Kandep Open | Enga | 1987–2002 |
| Eddy Saweni | Independent | Aitape-Lumi Open | West Sepik | 1997–2002 |
| Viviso Seravo | People's Democratic Movement | Henganofi Open | Eastern Highlands | 1992–1993, 1997–2002 |
| Bill Skate | People's National Congress | Nat. Capital District Provincial | NCD | 1992–2006 |
| Sylvanes Siembo | Pangu Party | Northern Provincial | Northern | 1992–2002 |
| Arthur Somare | National Alliance Party | Angoram Open | East Sepik | 1997–2012 |
| Sir Michael Somare | National Alliance Party | East Sepik Provincial | East Sepik | 1968–2017 |
| Henry Smith | People's Unity Party | Goroka Open | Eastern Highlands | 1997–2002 |
| Kala Swokin | People's Solidarity Party | North Fly Open | Western Province | 1977–1992, 1997–2002 |
| Phillip Taku | People's National Congress | Moresby North East Open | NCD | 1997–2002 |
| Bevan Tambi | United Party | Jimi Open | Western Highlands | 1997–2002 |
| John Tekwie | Independent | West Sepik Provincial | West Sepik | 1992–2002 |
| Tom Tomiape | United Party | Tari Open | Southern Highlands | 1997–2007 |
| Muki Taranupi | Christian Democratic Party | Obura-Wonenara Open | Eastern Highlands | 1997–2002 |
| Paul Tohian | People's Progress Party | New Ireland Provincial | New Ireland | 1992–2002 |
| Tommy Tomscoll | Independent | Middle Ramu Open | Madang | 1997–2002, 2003, 2012–2017 |
| Bernard Vogae | National Alliance Party | West New Britain Provincial | West New Britain | 1987–1992, 1997–2000 |
| Simeon Wai | People's National Congress | Karimui-Nomane Open | Chimbu | 1997–2002 |
| Peter Waieng | Independent | Kundiawa Open | Chimbu | 1997–2002 |
| John Waiko | People's Action Party | Sohe Open | Northern | 1992–2002 |
| Jacob Wama | Independent | Madang Open | Madang | 1997–2002 |
| Joseph Wamil | Independent | Gumine Open | Chimbu | 1997–2002 |
| George Wan | People's Progress Party | Usino Bundi Open | Madang | 1992–2002 |
| Kennedy Wenge | Independent | Nawae Open | Morobe | 1997–2002, 2017–present |
| Luther Wenge | Independent | Morobe Provincial | Morobe | 1997–2012 |
| Micah Wes | Independent | Vanimo-Green River Open | West Sepik | 1982–1987, 1997–2002 |
| Dibara Yagabo | People's National Congress | Rigo Open | Central | 1992–2002 |
| Roy Yaki | People's Democratic Movement | Ialibu-Pangia Open | Southern Highlands | 1987–2002 |
| Gallus Yumbui | Independent | Wosera-Gawi Open | East Sepik | 1997–2007 |
| Mao Zeming | Independent | Tewae-Siassi Open | Morobe | 1995–2003, 2012–2017 |
