= Members of the National Parliament of Papua New Guinea, 1987–1992 =

This is a list of members of the National Parliament of Papua New Guinea from 1987 to 1992, as elected at the 1987 election.

Member	Party	Electorate	Province
Judah Akesim (Note: Ambunti-Dreikikir Open MP Pius Malip died in a car accident on 21 November 1988. Judah Akesim won the resulting by-election in April 1989.)	Pangu Party	Ambunti-Dreikikir Open	East Sepik
Tom Amaiu	Independent	Kompiam Ambum Open	Enga
William Ank	People's Progress Party	Mendi Open	Southern Highlands
Joseph Aoae	People's Party	Kairuku-Hiri Open	Central
Malipu Balakau	National Party	Enga Provincial	Enga
Raphael Bele	Melanesian Alliance Party	Central Bougainville Open	Bougainville
Mathew Bendumb	Pangu Party	Bulolo Open	Morobe
Hugo Berghuser	National Party	Nat. Capital District Provincial	NCD
David Beu	People's Action Party	Sohe Open	Northern
Timothy Bonga	Pangu Party	Nawae Open	Morobe
Bob Bubac	Pangu Party	North Fly Open	Western Province
Esorom Burege	Pangu Party	Gazelle Open	East New Britain
Sir Julius Chan	People's Progress Party	Namatanai Open	New Ireland
Ted Diro	People's Action Party	Central Provincial	Central
Akoka Doi	Independent	Ijivitari Open	Northern
Gai Duwabane	National Party	Daulo Open	Eastern Highlands
Philemon Embel	Independent	Nipa-Kutubu Open	Southern Highlands
Peter Gaige	Independent	Obura-Wonenara Open	Eastern Highlands
Peter Garong	Pangu Party	Tewae-Siassi Open	Morobe
Ben Garry	Morobe Independent Group	Huon Gulf Open	Morobe
Benson Garui	People's Action Party	Northern Provincial	Northern
Jack Genia	Pangu Party	Abau Open	Central
John Giheno	Pangu Party	Henganofi Open	Eastern Highlands
Henu Hesingut	Pangu Party	Finschhafen Open	Morobe
Tom Horik	People's Democratic Movement	Kabwum Open	Morobe
Harry Humphreys (Note: Talasea Open MP Harry Humphreys died in 1988. Patterson Lowa won the resulting by-election later that year.)	Pangu Party	Talasea Open	West New Britain
Masket Iangalio	Independent	Wapenamanda Open	Enga
Mathias Ijape	National Party	Goroka Open	Eastern Highlands
Toni Ila	Pangu Party	Lae Open	Morobe
Daniel Itu	People's Action Party	Kerema Open	Gulf
Aiva Ivarato	People's Democratic Movement	Eastern Highlands Provincial	Eastern Highlands
Alfred Kaiabe (Note: The National Court declared the election of Komo-Magarima MP Maribe Makiba to be void on 5 June 1989. Alfred Kaiabe, the successful petitioner against Makiba, won the resulting by-election in 1990.)	People's Solidarity Party	Komo-Magarima Open	Southern Highlands
Paul Kamod	Pangu Party	Madang Open	Madang
John Kaputin	Independent	Rabaul Open	East New Britain
Albert Karo	People's Democratic Movement	Moresby South Open	NCD
Melchior Kasap	Melanesian Alliance Party	Madang Provincial	Madang
Jerry Kavori	People's Democratic Movement	Lufa Open	Eastern Highlands
Billy Kepi (Note: Okapa Open MP Billy Kepi died in 1988. Castan Maibawa won the resulting by-election later that year.)	United Party	Okapa Open	Eastern Highlands
Albert Kipalan	People's Progress Party	Wabag Open	Enga
Alois Koki	Pangu Party	Pomio Open	East New Britain
Wiwa Korowi	Independent	Southern Highlands Provincial	Southern Highlands
Peter Kuman	People's Democratic Movement	Chimbu Provincial	Chimbu
Peter Kungka	Melanesian Alliance Party	South Bougainville Open	Bougainville
James Kuru Kupul	People's Democratic Movement	Jimi Open	Western Highlands
Galeva Kwarara	People's Party	Rigo Open	Central
Philip Laki	Pangu Party	Angoram Open	East Sepik
Galen Lang	Independent	Sumkar Open	Madang
Iairo Lasaro	Independent	Alotau Open	Milne Bay
Tenda Lau	Independent	Lagaip Porgera Open	Enga
Jacob Lemeki	People's Progress Party	Samarai-Murua Open	Milne Bay
Patterson Lowa	Melanesian Alliance Party	Talasea Open	West New Britain
Sir Pita Lus	Pangu Party	Maprik Open	East Sepik
Harulai Mai	People's Democratic Movement	Tari Open	Southern Highlands
Castan Maibawa	Independent	Okapa Open	Eastern Highlands
Marabe Makiba	People's Democratic Movement	Komo-Magarima Open	Southern Highlands
Johnson Maladina	Independent	Esa'ala Open	Milne Bay
Pius Malip	Independent	Ambunti-Dreikikir Open	East Sepik
Steven Mambon	Morobe Independent Group	Markham Open	Morobe
Allan Ebu Marai	National Party	Kikori Open	Gulf
Arnold Marsipal	Pangu Party	Manus Provincial	Manus
Aruru Matiabe	National Party	Koroba-Lake Kopiago Open	Southern Highlands
Michael Mel	National Party	Anglimp-South Waghi Open	Western Highlands
Wagi Merimba	Independent	Kundiawa Open	Chimbu
Fr John Momis	Melanesian Alliance Party	Bougainville Provincial	Bougainville
Beona Motawiya	People's Progress Party	Kiriwina-Goodenough Open	Milne Bay
Rabbie Namaliu	Pangu Party	Kokopo Open	East New Britain
Bernard Narokobi	Melanesian Alliance Party	Wewak Open	East Sepik
Thomas Negints	People's Democratic Movement	Tambul-Nebilyer Open	Western Highlands
Bill Ninkama	People's Democratic Movement	Gumine Open	Chimbu
Aron Noaio	People's Action Party	Gulf Provincial	Gulf
John Numi	National Party	Sinasina-Yonggamugl Open	Chimbu
Michael Ogio	Independent	North Bougainville Open	Bougainville
Samuel Pariwa	League for National Advancement	Rai Coast Open	Madang
Joel Paua	National Party	Baiyer-Mul Open	Western Highlands
Melchior Pep	Pangu Party	Dei Open	Western Highlands
James Pokasui	Independent	Manus Open	Manus
Paul Pora	National Party	Hagen Open	Western Highlands
Gabriel Ramoi	People's Democratic Movement	Aitape-Lumi Open	West Sepik
Andrew Ruddaka	Independent	Goilala Open	Central
Benais Sabumei	National Party	Unggai-Bena Open	Eastern Highlands
Utula Samana	Morobe Independent Group	Morobe Provincial	Morobe
Christopher Sambre	Pangu Party	Nuku Open	West Sepik
Jimson Sauk	Independent	Kandep Open	Enga
Babadi Sawasi	People's Party	Middle Fly Open	Western Province
Gerard Sigulogo	Melanesian Alliance Party	Kavieng Open	New Ireland
Brown Sinamoi	National Party	Chuave Open	Chimbu
Michael Singan	Independent	New Ireland Provincial	New Ireland
Paul Powa Sisioka	People's Democratic Movement	Karimui-Nomane Open	Chimbu
Sir Michael Somare	Pangu Party	East Sepik Provincial	East Sepik
Karl Stack	League for National Advancement	West Sepik Provincial	West Sepik
Robert Suckling	People's Action Party	Moresby North West Open	NCD
Kala Swokin	People's Action Party	Western Provincial	Western
Avusi Tanao	People's Democratic Movement	Kainantu Open	Eastern Highlands
Felix Tapineng	League for National Advancement	Telefomin Open	West Sepik
Anthony Temo	People's Democratic Movement	Imbonggu Open	Southern Highlands
Ereman Tobaining Sr.	Pangu Party	East New Britain Provincial	East New Britain
Soso Tomu	Pangu Party	Kagua-Erave Open	Southern Highlands
Theodore Tuya	People's Progress Party	Usino Bundi Open	Madang
David Unagi	People's Democratic Movement	Moresby North East Open	NCD
Bernard Vogae	Pangu Party	Kandrian-Gloucester Open	West New Britain
Jim Yer Waim	Independent	Kerowagi Open	Chimbu
Ainde Wainzo	Morobe Independent Group	Menyamya Open	Morobe
Lucas Waka	Pangu Party	West New Britain Provincial	West New Britain
Paul Wanjik	Pangu Party	Wosera-Gawi Open	East Sepik
Tim Ward	Independent	Bogia Open	Madang
John Wawia	Pangu Party	Yangoru-Saussia Open	East Sepik
William Wii	National Party	North Waghi Open	Western Highlands
Paias Wingti	People's Democratic Movement	Western Highlands Provincial	Western Highlands
Roy Yaki	People's Democratic Movement	Ialibu-Pangia Open	Southern Highlands
James Yakip	Melanesian Alliance Party	Middle Ramu Open	Madang
Wap Yawo	Independent	Vanimo-Green River Open	West Sepik
Dennis Young	Pangu Party	Milne Bay Provincial	Milne Bay
Parry Zeipi	Independent	South Fly Open	Western
