= Members of the National Parliament of Papua New Guinea, 1982–1987 =

This is a list of members of the National Parliament of Papua New Guinea from 1982 to 1987, as elected at the 1982 election.

Member	Electorate	Province
Poate Henry Andrew	Esa'ala Open	Milne Bay
Caspar Anggua	Bogia Open	Madang
William Ank	Mendi Open	Southern Highlands
Anthony Anugu	South Bougainville Open	Bougainville
Joseph Aoae	Kairuku-Hiri Open	Central
Lennie Aparima	Obura-Wonenara Open	Eastern Highlands
Tom Awasa	Huon Gulf Open	Morobe
Tony Bais	Wewak Open	East Sepik
Raphael Bele	Central Bougainville Open	Bougainville
Mathew Bendumb	Bulolo Open	Morobe
Timothy Bonga	Nawae Open	Morobe
Philip Bouraga	Nat. Capital District Provincial	NCD
Neville Bourne	Menyamya Open	Morobe
Sir Julius Chan	Namatanai Open	New Ireland
Ted Diro	Central Provincial	Central
Akoka Doi	Ijivitari Open	Northern
Warren Dutton	North Fly Open	Western Province
Gai Duwabane	Daulo Open	Eastern Highlands
Roy Evara	Kikori Open	Gulf
Tony Farapo	Gulf Provincial	Gulf
Mafuk Gainda	Rai Coast Open	Madang
Jack Genia	Abau Open	Central
John Giheno	Henganofi Open	Eastern Highlands
Henu Hesingut	Finschhafen Open	Morobe
Barry Holloway	Eastern Highlands Provincial	Eastern Highlands
Harry Humphreys	Talasea Open	West New Britain
Toni Ila	Lae Open	Morobe
Mark Ipuia	Lagaip Porgera Open	Enga
John Jaminan	Yangoru-Saussia Open	East Sepik
Mackenzie Jovopa	Sohe Open	Northern
Pato Kakaraya	Wapenamanda Open	Enga
Paul Kamod	Madang Open	Madang
Pundia Kange	Ialibu-Pangia Open	Southern Highlands
John Kaputin	Rabaul Open	East New Britain
Neapukali Kemben	Kompiam Ambum Open	Enga
Malo Kiniyafa (Note: Malo Kiniyafa's election was overturned by a court ruling in 1983. The resulting by-election was won by Iambakey Okuk.)	Unggai-Bena Open	Eastern Highlands
Albert Kipalan	Wabag Open	Enga
Karl Kitchens Stack	West Sepik Provincial	West Sepik
Alois Koki	Pomio Open	East New Britain
Bebes Korowaro	Goroka Open	Eastern Highlands
Peter Kuman	Kundiawa Open	Chimbu
Tani Kungo	Kabwum Open	Morobe
James Kuru Kupul	Jimi Open	Western Highlands
Parua Kuri	Dei Open	Western Highlands
Galeva Kwarara	Rigo Open	Central
Philip Laki	Angoram Open	East Sepik
Kindi Lawi	Western Highlands Provincial	Western Highlands
Jacob Lemeki	Samarai-Murua Open	Milne Bay
Noel Levi	New Ireland Provincial	New Ireland
Pita Lus	Maprik Open	East Sepik
Harulai Mai	Tari Open	Southern Highlands
Marabe Makiba	Komo-Magarima Open	Southern Highlands
Kare Maor	Sumkar Open	Madang
Aruru Matiabe	Koroba-Lake Kopiago Open	Southern Highlands
Fr John Momis	Bougainville Provincial	Bougainville
Louis Mona	Goilala Open	Central
Beona Motawiya	Kiriwina-Goodenough Open	Milne Bay
Tom Muliap	Usino Bundi Open	Madang
Fr David Genjim Mump	Middle Ramu Open	Madang
Simon Mumurit	Alotau Open	Milne Bay
Rabbie Namaliu	Kokopo Open	East New Britain
Thomas Negints	Tambul-Nebilyer Open	Western Highlands
John Nilkare	Chimbu Provincial	Chimbu
Bill Ninkama	Gumine Open	Chimbu
Aron Noaio	Kerema Open	Gulf
John Numi	Sinasina-Yonggamugl Open	Chimbu
Iambakey Okuk (Note: Iambakey Okuk died in 1986. The resulting by-election was won by Benias Sabumei.)	Unggai-Bena Open	Eastern Highlands
Suinavi Otio	Lufa Open	Eastern Highlands
Tom Pais	Madang Provincial	Madang
Roger Palme	Anglimp-South Waghi Open	Western Highlands
Joel Paua	Baiyer-Mul Open	Western Highlands
Kamena Pilisa	Middle Fly Open	Western Province
Michael Pondros	Manus Provincial	Manus
Francis Pusal	Southern Highlands Provincial	Southern Highlands
Gabriel Ramoi	Aitape-Lumi Open	West Sepik
Mahuru Rarua Rarua	Moresby North West Open	NCD
Nahau Rooney	Manus Open	Manus
Benias Sabumei	Unggai-Bena Open	Eastern Highlands
Boyamo Sali	Morobe Provincial	Morobe
Christopher Sambre	Nuku Open	West Sepik
Pius Sangumai	Kandrian-Gloucester Open	West New Britain
Tony Siaguru	Moresby North East Open	NCD
Paul Powa Sisioka	Karimui-Nomane Open	Chimbu
Sir Michael Somare	East Sepik Provincial	East Sepik
Asimboro Ston	Ambunti-Dreikikir Open	East Sepik
Kala Swokin	Western Provincial	Western
Steven Tago	Northern Provincial	Northern
Avusi Tanao	Kainantu Open	Eastern Highlands
Felix Tapineng	Telefomin Open	West Sepik
Epel Tito	Kavieng Open	New Ireland
Ereman Tobaining Sr.	East New Britain Provincial	East New Britain
Soso Tomu	Kagua-Erave Open	Southern Highlands
Paul Torato	Enga Provincial	Enga
Martin Tovadek	Gazelle Open	East New Britain
David Tul	Kerowagi Open	Chimbu
Sam Tulo	North Bougainville Open	Bougainville
Legu Vagi	Moresby South Open	NCD
Bai Waiba	Nipa-Kutubu Open	Southern Highlands
Lucas Waka	West New Britain Provincial	West New Britain
Paul Wanjik	Wosera-Gawi Open	East Sepik
Glaimi Warena	Imbonggu Open	Southern Highlands
Willard Wemalo	Tewae-Siassi Open	Morobe
Micah Wes	Vanimo-Green River Open	West Sepik
William Wii	North Waghi Open	Western Highlands
Paias Wingti	Hagen Open	Western Highlands
Labi Yabanoya	Okapa Open	Eastern Highlands
John Yaka	Kandep Open	Enga
Giri Yaru	Markham Open	Morobe
Robert Yabara	Chuave Open	Chimbu
Dennis Young	Milne Bay Provincial	Milne Bay
Parry Zeipi	South Fly Open	Western
