= Members of the National Parliament of Papua New Guinea, 2017–2022 =

This is a list of members of the National Parliament of Papua New Guinea from 2017 to 2022, as elected at the 2017 election.

Member	Party	Electorate	Province	Term in office
Charles Abel	Our Development Party Prior: People's National Congress	Alotau Open	Milne Bay	2007–present
Robert Agarobe	Pangu Party Prior: Independent	Central Provincial	Central	2017–present
Sekie Agisa	Pangu Party Prior: People's Labour Party	South Fly Open	Western	2017–present
Sam Akoitai	United Resources Party	Central Bougainville Open	Bougainville	1997–2008, 2018–2021 (dec.)
Benny Allan	People's National Congress	Unggai-Bena Open	Eastern Highlands	2002–present
Jonny Alonk	United Resources Party	Middle Ramu Open	Madang	2017–2021 (dec.)
Aiye Tambua	Pangu Party	Goroka Open	Eastern Highlands	2020–present
Henry Amuli	Melanesian Alliance Party Prior: Independent, Pangu Party	Sohe Open	Northern	2017–present
Robert Atiyafa	People's National Congress	Henganofi Open	Eastern Highlands	2012–present
Patrick Basa	Independent	Kabwum Open	Morobe	2017–present
Sam Basil	Melanesian Alliance Party Prior: Pangu Party	Bulolo Open	Morobe	2007–2022 (dec.)
Charlie Benjamin	Unaffiliated Prior: People's National Congress	Manus Provincial	Manus	1997–2007, 2012–present
Allan Bird	National Alliance Party	East Sepik Provincial	East Sepik	2017–present
Roy Biyama	People's National Congress	Middle Fly Open	Western	2002–2021 (dec.)
Michael Dua	United Resources Party Prior: Triumph Heritage Empowerment Party	Chimbu Provincial	Chimbu	2017–present
Dr Kobby Bomareo	Pangu Party	Tewae-Siassi Open	Morobe	2017–present
Sir Julius Chan	People's Progress Party	New Ireland Provincial	New Ireland	1968–1997, 2007–present
John Luke Crittin	People's National Congress	Milne Bay Provincial	Milne Bay	2007–2012, 2017–present
Win Bakri Daki	People's National Congress Prior: Independent	Tambul-Nebilyer Open	Western Highlands	2017–present
James Donald	People's Party Prior: People's Progress Party, Papua New Guinea Party	North Fly Open	Western	2017–present
William Duma	United Resources Party	Hagen Open	Western Highlands	2002–present
Soroi Eoe	People's National Congress Prior: PNG National Party	Kikori Open	Gulf	2017–present
Pogio Ghate	Pangu Party Prior: Social Democratic Party	Daulo Open	Eastern Highlands	2017–present
Wake Goi	People's National Congress	Jimi Open	Jiwaka	2007–2012, 2017–present
Lekwa Gure	Melanesian Alliance Party Prior: Independent, Pangu Party	Rigo Open	Central	2017–present
Chris Haiveta	Papua New Guinea Country Party	Gulf Provincial	Gulf	1992–2007, 2017–present
Koni Iguan	Melanesian Alliance Party Prior: Pangu Party	Markham Open	Morobe	2007–2012, 2017–present
Sir Peter Ipatas	People's Party Prior: People's National Congress	Enga Provincial	Enga	1997–present
Kevin Isifu	People's Progress Party	Wewak Open	East Sepik	2017–present
Peter Isoaimo	National Alliance Party	Kairuku-Hiri Open	Central	2014–present
Gary Juffa	People's Movement for Change	Northern Provincial	Northern	2012–present
Geoffery Kama	Triumph Heritage Empowerment Party	Karimui-Nomane Open	Chimbu	2012–present
Elias Kapavore	People's National Congress	Pomio Open	East New Britain	2015–present
Tomait Kapili	United Resources Party	Lagaip-Porgera Open	Enga	2012–present
John Kaupa	Social Democratic Party Prior: PNG National Party, People's National Congress	Moresby North-East Open	NCD	2017–present
Moriape Kavori	Melanesian Alliance Party Prior: THEP, Pangu Party	Lufa Open	Eastern Highlands	2012–present
Mehrra Minne Kipefa	United Resources Party	Obura-Wonenara Open	Eastern Highlands	2012–present
Jeffery Komal	People's National Congress	Nipa-Kutubu Open	Southern Highlands	2012–present
Nakikus Konga	People's Progress Party	East New Britain Provincial	East New Britain	1992–2000, 2017–present
Bryan Jared Kramer	Allegiance Party Prior: Pangu Party	Madang Open	Madang	2017–present
Kerenga Kua	PNG National Party	Sinasina-Yongomugl Open	Chimbu	2012–present
Joe Kuli	United Resources Party	Angalimp-South Waghi Open	Jiwaka	2017–present
Nick Kuman	People's National Congress	Gumine Open	Chimbu	2002–2007, 2013–present
Joseph Lelang	Coalition for Reform Party	Kandrian-Gloucester Open	West New Britain	2012–present
Isi Leonard	PNG National Party Prior: Papua New Guinea Party	Samarai-Murua Open	Milne Bay	2017–present
Joe Lera	United Resources Party	Bougainville Provincial	Bougainville	2012–present
Ian Ling-Stuckey	National Alliance Party	Kavieng Open	New Ireland	1997–2007, 2017–present
Manasseh Makiba	Independent Prior: People's National Congress	Komo-Magarima Open	Hela	2017–present
Alfred Manasseh	People's National Congress	Kandep Open	Enga	2017–present
Francis Maneke	Unaffiliated Prior: Our Development Party, People's National Congress	Talasea Open	West New Britain	2017–present
James Marape	Pangu Party Prior: People's National Congress	Tari-Pori Open	Hela	2007–present
Dr Allan Marat	Melanesian Liberal Party	Rabaul Open	East New Britain	2002–present
Richard Maru	People's National Congress	Yangoru-Saussia Open	East Sepik	2012–present
Richard Masere	People's National Congress Prior: National Alliance Party	Ijivitari Open	Northern	2017–present
Timothy Masiu	National Alliance Party	South Bougainville Open	Bougainville	2016–present
Richard Mendani	National Alliance Party	Kerema Open	Gulf	2012–2021 (dec.)
Solan Mirisim	People's National Congress	Telefomin Open	West Sepik	2012–present
Sir Mekere Morauta	National Alliance	Moresby North-West Open	NCD	2017–2020 (dec.)
Lohia Boe Samuel	Pangu Party Prior: Independent	Moresby North-West Open	NCD	2021–present
Wera Mori	Unaffiliated Prior: People's National Congress	Chuave Open	Chimbu	2012–present
Sasindran Muthuvel	People's National Congress	West New Britain Provincial	West New Britain	2012–present
Robert Naguri	National Alliance Party	Bogia Open	Madang	2017–present
William Nakin	National Alliance Party	North Bougainville Open	Bougainville	2017–present
Michael Nali	People's National Congress Prior: Independent	Mendi Open	Southern Highlands	2017–present
Belden Namah	Papua New Guinea Party	Vanimo-Green River Open	West Sepik	2007–present
Chris Nangoi	Melanesian Alliance Party Prior: Pangu Party	Sumkar Open	Madang	2017–2022 (dec.)
Pila Niningi	People's National Congress Prior: Independent	Imbonggu Open	Southern Highlands	2017–present
Westly Nukundi	People's National Congress	Dei Open	Western Highlands	2012–present
Peter Numu	PNG One Nation Party	Eastern Highlands Provincial	Eastern Highlands	2017–present
Peter O'Neill	People's National Congress	Ialibu-Pangia Open	Southern Highlands	2002–present
William Gogl Onglo	United Resources Party Prior: Independent	Kundiawa-Gembogl Open	Chimbu	2017–present
Rainbo Paita	Pangu Party	Finschhafen Open	Morobe	2017–present
Bari Palma	People's National Congress Prior: Papua New Guinea Party	Kerowagi Open	Chiumbu	2017–present
Powes Parkop	Social Democratic Party	National Capital District Provincial	NCD	2007–present
Rimbink Pato	United Party	Wapenamanda Open	Enga	2012–present
Thomas Pelika	Melanesian Alliance Party Prior: Pangu Party	Menyamya Open	Morobe	1992–2002, 2017–2020 (Dec)
Dr Fabian Pok	United Resources Party	North Waghi Open	Jiwaka	1997–2002, 2012–present
Job Pomat	People's National Congress	Manus Open	Manus	2007–2012, 2017–present
William Powi	Unaffiliated Prior: People's National Congress	Southern Highlands Provincial	Southern Highlands	2012–present
Patrick Pruaitch	National Alliance Party	Aitape Lumi Open	West Sepik	2002–present
John Pundari	Unaffiliated Prior: People's National Congress	Kompiam-Ambum Open	Enga	1992–2002, 2007–present
Wesley Raminai	United Resources Party Prior: Independent	Kagua-Erave Open	Southern Highlands	2017–present
John Rosso	Pangu Party Prior: Independent	Lae Open	Morobe	2017–present
William Samb	Pangu Party	Goilala Open	Central	2015–2022 (dec.)
Ginson Saonu	Pangu Party	Morobe Provincial	Morobe	1992–2002, 2017–present
Peter Sapia	Melanesian Alliance Party Prior: PNG National Party, Pangu Party	Rai Coast Open	Madang	2017–present
Walter Schnaubelt	National Alliance Party	Namatanai Open	New Ireland	2017–present
Ross Seymour	Pangu Party Prior: National Alliance Party	Huon Gulf Open	Morobe	2012–present
John Simon	Unaffiliated Prior: National Alliance Party, People's National Congress	Maprik Open	East Sepik	2012–present
Saki Soloma	Unaffiliated Prior: T.H.E. Party, People's National Congress	Okapa Open	Eastern Highlands	2017–present
Davis Steven	Unaffiliated Prior: People's National Congress	Esa'ala Open	Milne Bay	2012–present
Joe Sungi	National Alliance Party	Nuku Open	West Sepik	2012–present
Emil Tamur	People's Progress Party	Kokopo Open	East New Britain	2017–present
Sir Puka Temu	Our Development Party Prior: People's National Congress	Abau Open	Central	2002–2003, 2003–present
Justin Tkatchenko	People's National Congress	Moresby South Open	NCD	2012–present
Petrus Thomas	Independent	Koroba-Lake Kopiago Open	Hela	2003–2005, 2017–present
Lino Tom	Pangu Party Prior: Independent	Wabag Open	Enga	2017–present
Douglas Tomuriesa	Unaffiliated Prior: People's National Congress	Kiriwina-Goodenough Open	Milne Bay	2012–present
William Tongamp	People's Party	Jiwaka Provincial	Jiwaka	2012–present
Koi Trape	People's National Congress	Baiyer-Mul Open	Western Highlands	2012–present
Johnson Tuke	People's Progress Party	Kainantu Open	Eastern Highlands	2012–present
Jimmy Uguro	Unaffiliated Prior: National Alliance Party, People's National Congress	Usino-Bundi Open	Madang	2017–present
Phillip Undialu	Unaffiliated Prior: People's National Congress	Hela Provincial	Hela	2012–present
Salio Waipo	National Alliance Party	Angoram Open	East Sepik	2013–present
Johnson Wapunai	People's National Congress	Ambunti-Dreikikir Open	East Sepik	2017–present
Kennedy Wenge	Melanesian Alliance Party Prior: Pangu Party	Nawae Open	Morobe	1997–2002, 2017–present
Paias Wingti	People's Democratic Movement	Western Highlands Provincial	Western Highlands	1977–2007, 2012–present
Jelta Wong	United Resources Party	Gazelle Open	East New Britain	2017–present
Tony Wouwou	People's National Congress Prior: Papua New Guinea Party	West Sepik Provincial	West Sepik	2017–present
Peter Yama	People's Labour Party	Madang Provincial	Madang	1992–1997, 2002–2007, 2017–present
Joseph Yopyyopy	Melanesian Alliance Party	Wosera-Gaui Open	East Sepik	2012–present
Taboi Awi Yoto	People's National Congress Prior: United Resources Party, Papua New Guinea Party	Western Provincial	Western	2017–present

== Former MPs in 10th Parliament ==
Member	Party	Electorate	Province	Term in office
Fr Simon Dumarinu	Social Democratic Party	Central Bougainville Open	Bougainville	2017–2018
