= Members of the National Parliament of Papua New Guinea, 1977–1982 =

This is a list of members of the National Parliament of Papua New Guinea from 1977 to 1982, as elected at the 1977 election.

Member	Electorate	Province
Josephine Abaijah	Nat. Capital District Provincial	NCD
Tei Abal	Wabag Open	Enga
Tom Amaiu	Kompiam Ambum Open	Enga
Caspar Anggua	Bogia Open	Madang
Posu Ank	Mendi Open	Southern Highlands
Anthony Anugu	South Bougainville Open	Bougainville
Joseph Aoae (Note: Kairuki-Hiri Open MP Simon Foieke had left office by the end of 1977; the reason is not known. Joseph Aoae won the resulting by-election in 1978.)	Kairuku-Hiri Open	Central
Lennie Aparima (Note: Obura-Wonenara Open MP Undapmaina Kalagune was killed in a plane crash in December 1978. Lennie Aparima won the resulting by-election in 1979.)	Obura-Wonenara Open	Eastern Highlands
Silas Atopare	Goroka Open	Eastern Highlands
Tony Bais	Wewak Open	East Sepik
Gabriel Bakani	Talasea Open	West New Britain
Raphael Bele	Central Bougainville Open	Bougainville
Yano Belo	Kagua-Erave Open	Southern Highlands
Mathew Bendumb	Bulolo Open	Morobe
Delba Biri	Gumine Open	Chimbu
Clement Boiye	Sinasina-Yonggamugl Open	Chimbu
Talu Bolt	North Waghi Open	Western Highlands
Julius Chan	Namatanai Open	New Ireland
Waliyato Clowes	Middle Fly Open	Western Province
Goasa Damena (Note: The National Court declared the election of Moresby North East Open MP Patterson Lowa to be void on 7 November 1977. Goasa Damena, the successful petitioner against Lowa, won the resulting by-election in 1978.)	Moresby North East Open	NCD
Konia Dewe	Kundiawa Open	Chimbu
Kingsford Dibela	Alotau Open	Milne Bay
Raphael Doa	Western Highlands Provincial	Western Highlands
Akoka Doi	Ijivitari Open	Northern
Warren Dutton	North Fly Open	Western Province
Gai Duwabane	Daulo Open	Eastern Highlands
Justin Edimani	Esa'ala Open	Milne Bay
Bill Eichorn	Angoram Open	East Sepik
Paiale Elo	Koroba-Lake Kopiago Open	Southern Highlands
Wesley Embahe	Northern Provincial	Northern
Roy Evara	Kikori Open	Gulf
Simon Foieke	Kairuku-Hiri Open	Central
Mafuk Gainda	Rai Coast Open	Madang
Wagua Goiye	Kerowagi Open	Chimbu
John Guise	Milne Bay Provincial	Milne Bay
Walla Gukguk	Kavieng Open	New Ireland
Dambali Habe	Komo-Magarima Open	Southern Highlands
Billy Hai	Okapa Open	Eastern Highlands
Barry Holloway	Eastern Highlands Provincial	Eastern Highlands
Toni Ila	Lae Open	Morobe
Mark Ipuia	Lagaip Porgera Open	Enga
Wesani Iwoksim	Telefomin Open	West Sepik
John Jaminan	Yangoru-Saussia Open	East Sepik
Bruce Jephcott	Madang Provincial	Madang
Pato Kakaraya	Wapenamanda Open	Enga
Undapmaina Kalagune	Obura-Wonenara Open	Eastern Highlands
Nebare Kamun	Karimui-Nomane Open	Chimbu
Pundia Kange	Ialibu-Pangia Open	Southern Highlands
Silingi Kapalik	Nawae Open	Morobe
John Kaputin	Rabaul Open	East New Britain
Thomas Kavali	Jimi Open	Western Highlands
Damien Kereku	East New Britain Provincial	East New Britain
Karl Kitchens	West Sepik Provincial	West Sepik
Alois Koki (Note: Pomio Open MP Koriam Urekit died in 1978. Alois Koki won the resulting by-election in 1979.)	Pomio Open	East New Britain
Ibne Kor	Nipa-Kutubu Open	Southern Highlands
Tom Koraea	Gulf Provincial	Gulf
Wiwa Korowi	Southern Highlands Provincial	Southern Highlands
Sununku Krokie	Henganofi Open	Eastern Highlands
Opai Kunangel	Anglimp-South Waghi Open	Western Highlands
Tani Kungo	Kabwum Open	Morobe
Parua Kuri	Dei Open	Western Highlands
Galeva Kwarara	Rigo Open	Central
Jacob Lemeki	Samarai-Murua Open	Milne Bay
Noel Levi	New Ireland Provincial	New Ireland
Patterson Lowa	Moresby North East Open	NCD
Pita Lus	Maprik Open	East Sepik
Kare Maor	Sumkar Open	Madang
Galopo Masa	Kandrian-Gloucester Open	West New Britain
Puliwa Mapikon	Tambul-Nebilyer Open	Western Highlands
Yambumbe Matias	Wosera-Gawi Open	East Sepik
Akepa Miakwe	Unggai-Bena Open	Eastern Highlands
Fr John Momis	Bougainville Provincial	Bougainville
Louis Mona	Goilala Open	Central
James Eki Mopio	Central Provincial	Central
Sevese Morea	Moresby South Open	NCD
Pyange Ni (Note: On 7 November 1977, the National Court voided the election of Baiyer-Mul Open MP Pyange Ni. Mek Nugints won the resulting by-election in 1978.)	Baiyer-Mul Open	Western Highlands
Aron Noaio	Kerema Open	Gulf
John Noel	Kiriwina-Goodenough Open	Milne Bay
Mek Nugints	Baiyer-Mul Open	Western Highlands
Iambakey Okuk	Chimbu Provincial	Chimbu
Ebia Olewale	South Fly Open	Western
Johnny Onjenga	Tewae-Siassi Open	Morobe
Suinavi Otio	Lufa Open	Eastern Highlands
Gerega Pepena	Abau Open	Central
Michael Pondros	Manus Provincial	Manus
Mahuru Rarua Rarua	Moresby North West Open	NCD
Wokam Rem	Middle Ramu Open	Madang
Opotio Rimoru	Usino Bundi Open	Madang
Nahau Rooney	Manus Open	Manus
Boyamo Sali	Morobe Provincial	Morobe
Christopher Sambre	Nuku Open	West Sepik
Nagibo Seregi	Huon Gulf Open	Morobe
Aksim Siming	Madang Open	Madang
Stephen Sio	Aitape-Lumi Open	West Sepik
Michael Somare	East Sepik Provincial	East Sepik
Asimboro Ston	Ambunti-Dreikikir Open	East Sepik
Kala Swokin	Western Provincial	Western
Steven Tago	Sohe Open	Northern
Paul Torato	Enga Provincial	Enga
Martin Tovadek	Gazelle Open	East New Britain
Oscar Tammur	Kokopo Open	East New Britain
Sam Tulo	North Bougainville Open	Bougainville
Koriam Urekit	Pomio Open	East New Britain
Manasseh Voeto	Menyamya Open	Morobe
Lucas Waka	West New Britain Provincial	West New Britain
Glaimi Warena	Imbonggu Open	Southern Highlands
Paias Wingti	Hagen Open	Western Highlands
Robert Yabara	Chuave Open	Chimbu
John Yaka	Kandep Open	Enga
Giri Yaru	Markham Open	Morobe
Wap Yawo	Vanimo-Green River Open	West Sepik
Yubiti Yulaki	Kainantu Open	Eastern Highlands
Matiabe Yuwi	Tari Open	Southern Highlands
Zibang Zurenuoc	Finschhafen Open	Morobe
