= Members of the National Parliament of Papua New Guinea =

The following are lists of members of the National Parliament of Papua New Guinea by term:

- Members of the National Parliament of Papua New Guinea, 1972–1977
- Members of the National Parliament of Papua New Guinea, 1977–1982
- Members of the National Parliament of Papua New Guinea, 1982–1987
- Members of the National Parliament of Papua New Guinea, 1987–1992
- Members of the National Parliament of Papua New Guinea, 1992–1997
- Members of the National Parliament of Papua New Guinea, 1997–2002
- Members of the National Parliament of Papua New Guinea, 2002–2007
- Members of the National Parliament of Papua New Guinea, 2007–2012
- Members of the National Parliament of Papua New Guinea, 2012–2017
- Members of the National Parliament of Papua New Guinea, 2017–2022
- Members of the National Parliament of Papua New Guinea, 2022–2027
