= Okapa =

Okapa may refer to:

== Geography ==
- Okapa District, Papua New Guinea
- East Okapa Rural LLG, Papua New Guinea
- West Okapa Rural LLG, Papua New Guinea

== Biology ==
- Kaveinga okapa, a groundbeetle
- Okapa (wasp), a genus of wasps in the family Platygastridae
