= Kamano =

Kamano may refer to:

== Places ==
- Kamano Island, Canada
- Kamano No. 1 Rural LLG, Papua New Guinea
- Kamano No. 2 Rural LLG, Papua New Guinea

== Languages ==
- Kamano language of Papua New Guinea

== People ==
- François Kamano
- Stacy Kamano
