= Kamano Rural LLG =

Kamano Rural LLG may refer to either of the following local-level governments of Papua New Guinea.

- Kamano No. 1 Rural LLG, Papua New Guinea
- Kamano No. 2 Rural LLG, Papua New Guinea
