= Yelia =

Yelia may refer to:

- Yelia Rural LLG
- Yelia (volcano)
