= Ekime Mek Gorosahu =

Papua New Guinean politician

Member of the National Parliament of Papua New Guinea for Daulo Open
- Incumbent
- Assumed office 9 February 2022
- Preceded by: Pogio Ghate

Personal details
- Party: United Resources Party

Ekime Mek Gorosahu is a Papua New Guinean politician of the United Resources Party. He won election to the National Parliament of Papua New Guinea in the 2022 Papua New Guinean general election.

== Biography ==
Gorosahu grew up in Asaroka. He earned a diploma in business and legal studies from Goroka Technical College. Before election to the Parliament, he worked as a para-legal and a coffee plantation owner. Upon his election, his stated plans for his work in Parliament were increasing access to basic education and healthcare. He also announced plans to create a highway from Chimbu to the Eastern Highlands.
