= Gadsup/Tairora Rural LLG =

Local-level government in Papua New Guinea

- Location within Papua New Guinea
- Coordinates: 6.40°S 145.95°E
- Country: Papua New Guinea
- Province: Eastern Highlands Province
- Time zone: UTC+10 (AEST)

District map of Eastern Highlands Province

Gadsup/Tairora Rural LLG is a local-level government (LLG) of Eastern Highlands Province, Papua New Guinea. The Gadsup language and Tairora language are spoken in the LLG.

== Wards ==
- 01. Orona
- 02. Mamarain
- 03. Binumarien
- 04. Pundibasa
- 05. Asa
- 06. Kubana
- 07. Yomuka
- 08. Karawepa
- 09. Binakemu
- 10. Arau
- 11. Osarora
- 12. Andandara
- 13. Erandora
- 14. Norikori
- 15. Nompia
- 16. Tontona
- 17. Norianda
- 18. Kosa
