= Lower Benna Rural LLG =

Local-level government in Papua New Guinea

- Country: Papua New Guinea
- Province: Eastern Highlands Province
- Time zone: UTC+10 (AEST)

District map of Eastern Highlands Province

Lower Benna Rural LLG is a local-level government (LLG) of Eastern Highlands Province, Papua New Guinea.

== Wards ==
- 01. Siokie
- 02. Katagu
- 03. Ketarabo
- 04. Korofeigu
- 05. Magitu
- 06. Hofagaiufa
- 07. Conner Bena
