= Kabwum District =

- Location within Papua New Guinea
- Coordinates: 6.401°S 147.364°E
- Country: Papua New Guinea
- Province: Morobe Province
- Capital: Kabwum

Government
  - MP: Patrick Basa

Area
  - Total: 2,778 km^{2} (1,073 sq mi)

Population (2024 census)
  - Total: 55,423
  - Density: 19.95/km^{2} (51.67/sq mi)
- Time zone: UTC+10 (AEST)

Kabwum District is a district of the Morobe Province of Papua New Guinea. Its capital is Kabwum. The population of the district was 63,214 at the 2021 census. The four local level governments (LLGs) are Komba, Selepet, Deyamos and Yus. The district shares borders with the Tawae-Siassi, Finschafen, Nawae and Markham Districts of Morobe Province, as well as the Rai Coast District of Madang Province. There is no direct road link from Lae City, the Provincial Capital to Kabwum District.

The main Christian Denomination in the area is The Evangelical Lutheran Church of Papua New Guinea. However, there are also other denominations such as Seventh Day Adventist, Revival PNG, Baptist and others which are common.
