= Ialibu =

- Location within Papua New Guinea
- Coordinates: 6°28′S 143°38′E
- Country: Papua New Guinea
- Province: Southern Highlands
- District: Ialibu-Pangia
- Elevation: 1,990 m (6,530 ft)

Population (2013)
  - Total: 10,314
- Time zone: UTC+10 (AEST)
- Climate: Cfb

Ialibu is a small township in the Southern Highlands Province of Papua New Guinea, serving as the headquarters for the Ialibu-Pangia District. It also caters for the Imbongungu speaking people of the Imbonggu Electorate. Ialibu is the transit point into the Kagua-Erave Electorate. The construction route of the Gulf Highway.

The town is administered by Ialibu Urban LLG.

== Culture ==
Ialibuans are known for weaving and selling vegetable baskets. It is one of the many ways which many rural people earn a living.

The Ialibu Museum was established in the 1990s. Languages spoken in the district are Kewabi and Immbonggu.

Some of the respected and notable personalities who have shaped Ialibu are the former Prime Minister of Papua New Guinea Peter O'Neill. Current PNG Defence Force Commander Brig. Gen. Gilbert Toropo is also a Ialibuan.

Ialibu has produced some high-profile leaders in the country. The former Prime Minister of Papua New Guinea Mr Peter O'Neill is from the Ialibu Pangia Electorate. The late Amb. Peter Ipu Peipul and former PNG Oppositions Leader Mr. Roy Yaki are also from the area. The sixth Governor General of PNG Sir Wiwa Korowi, is also from Ialibu.

Ialibu has produced and continues to produce many educated elites serving in the Public and Private sectors of the country including academic institutions who are actively contributing to the development of Papua New Guinea. Among them are: Leader for MP of Ialibu Pangia & former DO Leader Chief Roya https://www.thenational.com.pg/ialibu-pioneers-at-upng/

== Communications and transportation ==
Ialibu is connected by roads to the rest of the world. Ialibu does have a certified airstrip which is yet to be operational. The nearest airports are Mendi and Mt Hagen, both about an hour from Ialibu Station. Radio stations are available and mobile phone and landline phones are provided by Telikom PNG and DIGICEL. The national television station, EM TV is broadcast throughout the Ialibu area.

== Rivers ==
Rivers in Ialibu are: Yali, Yolo, Yalo (Mapele), Linege, Andowe and Ilge(Ice).

== Sports ==
Popular sports in Ialibu are: Rugby league, Basketball, volleyball, and Touch Rugby. Ialibu has produced many rugby league stars like, Raymond Karl, Mark Warua, Jessie Joe Parker, Dion Aiye and many more. They have all represented Papua New Guinea as Kumuls and super league.

Soccer has lost popularity since the 1980s.

== Landmarks and attractions ==
The most significant landmark feature is the Telikom PNG telecommunication tower. It is situated in the middle of the administration center. It is also home to Mount Ialibu and Mount Giluwe, which the second highest mountain in Papua New Guinea and a tourist attraction. So many other significant natural tourism attractions and natural flora and fauna within the vicinity of the central basin area maybe found in nearby geographical locations with close proximities.

== Health and education ==
The Ialibu District Hospital offers services to the Ialibu, Pangia, Kagua and Erave people. There is only one general practitioner here despite the fact that there is position for two medical officers. There are several nursing staff at the hospital. the common illnesses seen at the hospital are medical conditions including pneumonia, tuberculosis, malaria, asthma, COAD, as well as other infective conditions. The hospital also provides paediatrics care and obstetrics care as well. Lifestyle diseases like essential hypertension and diabetes mellitus are a rising problem in this area. Major cases the GP cannot manage are referred by car to the Mt. Hagen General Hospital. The hospital is state run.

Schools in the district include, Ialibu Secondary School, St Clare Primary School, Kepi Technical Vocational Training Institute, Ialibu Admin Primary School and Ialibu Lutheran Community School.

Products of Ialibu Secondary School include notable men and women like Prime Minister Peter O'Neill, Brigadier General Gilbert Toropo, MP Pilla Niningi, Jacob Iki, Aloysius Rema, Dr. Walipe Wingi, Dr. Pole Awei, Marley Undi, Dr. Kevin Pamba, Thomas Warua, Grace Warua, Maritha Warua, Dr Sam Kari, Mary Rema, Ruth Undi, Pat Matoli and many others currently in politics, in the Public Service, in the disciplinary forces, in the Private Sector and many engaging private business.

Ialibu will be home to the newly proposed Western Pacific University. This is the initiative of the former Prime Minister of PNG Honourable Peter O'Neil who is one of the favourite sons of Ialibu. The University is built on traditional land belonging to the Pekai Aluwe (Koromi) tribe of Ialibu.

== Climate ==
Ialibu has a subtropical highland climate (Cfb) with heavy to very heavy rainfall year-round.

Climate data for Ialibu
Month	Jan	Feb	Mar	Apr	May	Jun	Jul	Aug	Sep	Oct	Nov	Dec	Year
Mean daily maximum °C (°F)	22.3 (72.1)	22.3 (72.1)	22.0 (71.6)	22.1 (71.8)	22.1 (71.8)	21.1 (70.0)	20.3 (68.5)	20.7 (69.3)	21.2 (70.2)	21.8 (71.2)	22.2 (72.0)	22.2 (72.0)	21.7 (71.1)
Daily mean °C (°F)	16.8 (62.2)	17.0 (62.6)	16.8 (62.2)	16.7 (62.1)	16.7 (62.1)	15.6 (60.1)	15.3 (59.5)	15.6 (60.1)	15.9 (60.6)	16.2 (61.2)	16.2 (61.2)	16.7 (62.1)	16.3 (61.3)
Mean daily minimum °C (°F)	11.4 (52.5)	11.7 (53.1)	11.7 (53.1)	11.3 (52.3)	11.3 (52.3)	10.1 (50.2)	10.3 (50.5)	10.5 (50.9)	10.7 (51.3)	10.6 (51.1)	10.2 (50.4)	11.2 (52.2)	10.9 (51.7)
Average rainfall mm (inches)	318 (12.5)	332 (13.1)	367 (14.4)	319 (12.6)	234 (9.2)	189 (7.4)	233 (9.2)	237 (9.3)	315 (12.4)	346 (13.6)	305 (12.0)	344 (13.5)	3,539 (139.2)
Source: Climate-Data.org

== Surrounding villages ==
The villages nearby Ialibu are Topopulu, Yameyame (Yamex), Yal-Kuli, Kapolga, Yamba, Mungure, Maroloma, Riwi& Aropa, Koromi, Lama, Pale, Yarena, Muli, Yate, Paipa, Ponowi, Iombi, Karanas, Isale, Epeanda Mungumapu, Mondada, Kendgal (Kendayamo), Yailte Palta, Polgopo, Konjo, Kuyopulu, Koraipe, Kengaro, Pilipili Island (PSP), Kokola, Pope, Maral, Kalipine, Elgele, Kero, Kou, Kongibulg, Lipite, Pokorapulgu, Kirene, Kumbame, Pagipuru, Lepora, Walume, Pokale, Konapugl, Tirigipena, Oilge, Popurol, Karape Kaloli, Kume, Orei Kaupena, Yarepe and many more.

Main tribes surrounding the Ialibu township are Pekai Aluwe (Topopul, Koromi, Kapolga villages), Kauka Aluwe (Yameyame and Lama Sawmill villages) Rakili (Yamba, Lama Sawmill, Kemboli, Riro, Wangai, Yarena), Kepik/Kipurupa (Karanas, Aropa, Riwi, Kondeli, Yamonda, Lakira, Isale, Epeanda), Tangiki (Kendagl, Marapul, Kapipul, PSP), Makai (Walum, Kero, Kongibul), Yalipu Makai (Kokola), Warena (Kou, Kaupena), Ekai (Olga Pope, Mokapoi, Tilipunge, Marali, Kagoli Poine, Ilge No, Kalibine, Kaka, Elgele), Ekai (Muli), Ekai (Limbo) Koke (Maine Pope, Kokola), Pupai (Kendal, Polgopo) Kolgi (Kendal), Nemola (Ponowi), lagerepa Makai (Pale), Moi Marepa/Mokoi Makai (Pawia, Yarena), Walupape (Iate, Rawame, Nemola (Ponowi), Pouka.

The people from these places share the common local languages Imboungu and Kewabi. Imboungu is mainly spoken by central Ialibu and extends to Mt Hagen (Melpa) and Mendi (Mandi) whereas Kewabi is spoken by people living further east towards Kagua, Erave and Pangia Districts.

== See also ==
- Ialibu Urban LLG
- Ialibu Basin Rural LLG
