= Robert Atiyafa =

Papua New Guinean politician

Robert Atiyafa (born 12 June 1959) is a Papua New Guinean politician. A former Premier of Eastern Highlands Province under the former provincial government system, he has been a member of the National Parliament of Papua New Guinea since 2012, representing Henganofi Open, first as an independent and then later for the People's National Congress. He has been Minister for Police in the government of Peter O'Neill since February 2014.

Atiyafa was educated at the Finintugu Lutheran Primary School, Rongo Primary School and Asaroka Lutheran High School in the Eastern Highlands Province and Kerevat National High School in East New Britain Province, before graduating from the University of Papua New Guinea in political science. Prior to entering politics, he was a teacher at Henganofi High School, a public servant for the Eastern Highlands Provincial Government and council manager for the Henganofi Local Level Government Council. He was elected to the former Eastern Highlands Provincial Assembly for the Kafetina constituency in 1991, and was Premier of Eastern Highlands Province from 1991 to 1994. Following the 1995 abolition of decentralised provincial government, he was deputy governor of the province from 1995 to 1997.

He was elected to the National Parliament as an independent at the 2012 election on his fifth attempt. He had previously been defeated in the Henganofi seat at the 1997, 2002 and 2007 elections, on the last occasion for the National Party. He immediately caused some controversy by proposing a bill that would ban commissions of inquiry and tribunals in what a major newspaper described as "an attempt to legalise official corruption". In February 2014, Atiyafa, who had by now joined the governing People's National Congress, was appointed Minister for Police.

His government has faced a number of challenges in the police portfolio: in May 2015, Police Commissioner Geoffrey Vaki was sacked over concerns about declining standards and police brutality, and in August 2015 he directed police to refrain from carrying firearms in public wherever possible. He supported the involvement of Australian advisors in training Papua New Guinean police and advocated for the recruitment of officers from overseas in on-the-ground roles accountable to Papua New Guinean law, while expressing cynicism about previous arrangements involving the deployment of foreign police. During the 2016 student protests against the O'Neill government, he denied international media reports that demonstrators had been shot by police and stated that protestors preventing students from returning to class were "obstructing the rule of law and open to arrest and prosecution".

National Parliament of Papua New Guinea
Preceded by Ferao Orimyo	Member for Henganofi Open; 2012–present	Incumbent
