= East Okapa Rural LLG =

Local-level government in Papua New Guinea

- Country: Papua New Guinea
- Province: Eastern Highlands Province
- Time zone: UTC+10 (AEST)

District map of Eastern Highlands Province

East Okapa Rural LLG is a local-level government (LLG) of the Okapa District of the Eastern Highlands Province, Papua New Guinea.

== Wards ==
- 01. Purosa
- 02. Awarosa
- 03. Orie
- 04. Umasa
- 05. Yagareba
- 06. Paegatasa
- 07. Oma-Kasoru
- 08. Yasubi
- 09. Yagusa
- 10. Ibusa
- 11. Kasoru
- 12. Ofafina
- 13. Okapa Station
- 14. Kawaina
- 15. Avia
- 16. Asempa
- 17. Sefuna
- 18. Iwaki
