= Lamari =

Lamari is a surname. Notable people with the surname include:

- Mohamed Lamari (1939–2012), Chief of Staff of the Algerian army during most of the Algerian Civil War
- Mohamed Lamari (footballer) (born 1937), Moroccan footballer
- Smain Lamari (1941–2007), head of the Algerian Department of Counter-Espionage and Internal Security

== Places ==
Lamari can also refer to some places in Papua New Guinea.

- Lamari River, a river in Papua New Guinea
- Lamari Rural LLG, Papua New Guinea
