= Peter Waieng =

Papua New Guinean politician (1966–2013)

Peter G. Waieng (4 April 1966 – 22 August 2013) was a Papua New Guinea politician. Waieng served as a member of the National Parliament of Papua New Guinea, representing the Kundiawa-Gembogl constituency, from 1997 to 2002. Waieng also served as the Minister of Defence within the Prime Minister's cabinet as a member of parliament.

== Early life and education ==
Peter Waieng was born on 4 April 1966. He received a Bachelor of Arts in politics from the University of Papua New Guinea in 1989 and a master's degree in international relations from the University of Wollongong in 1995.

== Political career ==
Waieng was elected to the National Parliament of Papua New Guinea in the 1997 general election. He was 31 years old at the time of the election. He was appointed as the country's Minister of Defence during his first term. Waieng lost his bid for re-election in the 2002 general election.

Peter Waieng died on 22 August 2013 from injuries sustained in an attack at the age of 44.
