= Pius Malip =

Papua New Guinean politician

Member of the National Parliament
- In office 1987–1988
- Preceded by: Asimboro Ston
- Succeeded by: Judah Akesim
- Constituency: Ambunti-Dreikikir Open

Personal details
- Died: 21 November 1988; Port Moresby, Papua New Guinea

Pius Joseph Malip (died 21 November 1988) was a Papua New Guinean politician. He served as a member of the National Parliament from 1987 to 1988.

== Biography ==
Malip contested the Ambunti-Dreikikir Open constituency in the 1987 general elections as an independent candidate and was elected to the National Parliament, defeating the incumbent MP Asimboro Ston. However, he died in Port Moresby on 21 November 1988 following a car accident.

== See also ==
- List of members of the Papua New Guinean Parliament who died in office
