= West Okapa Rural LLG =

Local-level government in Papua New Guinea

- Location within Papua New Guinea
- Coordinates: 6.457957°S 145.524485°E
- Country: Papua New Guinea
- Province: Eastern Highlands Province
- Time zone: UTC+10 (AEST)

District map of Eastern Highlands Province

West Okapa Rural LLG is a local-level government (LLG) of Eastern Highlands Province, Papua New Guinea.

== Wards ==
- 01. Kemiu
- 02. Kokopi
- 03. Wayoepa
- 04. Tarabo
- 05. Ke'efu
- 06. Yagana
- 07. Haga
