= Deyamos Rural LLG =

Local-level government in Papua New Guinea

- Location within Papua New Guinea
- Coordinates: 6.091038°S 147.01282°E
- Country: Papua New Guinea
- Province: Morobe Province
- Time zone: UTC+10 (AEST)

Deyamos Rural LLG is a local-level government (LLG) of Morobe Province, Papua New Guinea.

== Wards ==
- 01. Hamelengan
- 02. Komutu
- 03. Yalument Station
- 04. Etaino
- 05. Birimon
- 06. Gomandat
- 07. Lewemon
- 08. Takop
- 09. Timovon
- 10. Mumunggam
- 11. Sambangan
- 12. Ongakei
- 13. Yakop
- 14. Yandu
- 15. Derim
- 16. Songgin
