= Talu Bolt =

Papua New Guinean politician

Member of the National Parliament
- In office 1977–1982
- Preceded by: Kaibelt Diria
- Succeeded by: William Wii
- Constituency: North Waghi Open

Personal details
- Died: 1989 (aged 55)

Talu Bolt (died 1989) was a Papua New Guinean politician. He served as a member of the National Parliament from 1977 to 1982.

== Biography ==
Bolt was a village official (tultul) and chief (luluai). He contested the North Waghi Open constituency in the 1977 general elections and was elected to the National Parliament, defeating the incumbent MP Kaibelt Diria. However, he was defeated in the 1982 elections by William Wii. He ran again in 1987 elections, but received only 319 first preference votes, the fewest of any of the sixteen candidates.

He died in early 1989 at the age of 55, survived by three wives and several children.
