= Lamari Rural LLG =

Local-level government in Papua New Guinea

- Location within Papua New Guinea
- Coordinates: 6.551098°S 145.975956°E
- Country: Papua New Guinea
- Province: Eastern Highlands Province
- Time zone: UTC+10 (AEST)

District map of Eastern Highlands Province

Lamari Rural LLG is a local-level government (LLG) of Eastern Highlands Province, Papua New Guinea.

== Wards ==
- 01. Motokara
- 02. Kobara
- 03. Atagara
- 04. Numbaira
- 05. Bibeori
- 06. Baira No. 2
- 07. Baira No. 1
- 08. Mei'auna
- 09. Ogurataba
- 10. Bi'api'arata
- 11. Bakumpa
- 12. Kawaina No. 1
- 13. Kumbora
- 14. Saurona
- 15. Obura Gov't Station
- 16. Kurunumbura
- 17. Yunura
- 18. Asara
- 19. Himarata
- 20. Anima
- 21. Tunana
- 22. Ahea
- 23. Habi ina
- 24. Oraura No. 1
- 25. Kokombira
- 26. Pinata
- 27. Owena
- 28. Tainoraba
- 29. Mobutasa
- 30. Agamusi
