= Yelia Rural LLG =

Local-level government in Papua New Guinea

- Location within Papua New Guinea
- Coordinates: 6.92°S 145.72°E
- Country: Papua New Guinea
- Province: Eastern Highlands Province
- Time zone: UTC+10 (AEST)

District map of Eastern Highlands Province

Yelia Rural LLG is a local-level government (LLG) of Eastern Highlands Province, Papua New Guinea.

== Wards ==
- 01. Garipme
- 02. Marawaka Station
- 03. Kwalusila
- 04. Marawaka
- 05. Giliwato
- 06. Gawoi
- 07. Sindainya
- 08. Jomuru
- 09. Yamuru
- 10. Mala
- 11. Sinei
- 12. Asenave
- 13. Boiko
- 14. Malari
- 15. Devevi
- 16. Yelia
- 17. Sesai / Tjejai
- 18. Kandwe / Miniri
- 19. Dungkwi
- 20. Ijelelukore
- 21. Nire
- 22. Pinji
- 23. Ororingo
- 24. Wiobo
- 25. Yanyi
- 26. Wapme/Wonenara
- 27. Butnari
- 28. Yabwiara
- 29. Orobina
- 30. Andakombi
- 31. Met'naka
- 32. Yakana
- 33. Simogu
- 34. Kamoiriba

== See also ==
- Yelia (volcano)
