= Ialibu Urban LLG =

Local-level government in Papua New Guinea

- Location within Papua New Guinea
- Coordinates: 6.266885°S 143.97352°E
- Country: Papua New Guinea
- Province: Southern Highlands Province
- Time zone: UTC+10 (AEST)

Ialibu Urban LLG is a local-level government (LLG) of Southern Highlands Province, Papua New Guinea.

== Wards ==
- 05. Yameyame
- 06. Topopugl 1
- 07. Topopugl 2
- 08. Kendal 2
- 09. Kokogla 1
- 10. Kendal 3
- 11. Kendal 4
- 82. Ialibu Station
