= Komba Rural LLG =

Local-level government in Papua New Guinea

Komba Rural LLG Seko Rural LLG
- Location within Papua New Guinea
- Coordinates: 6.226897°S 147.215256°E
- Country: Papua New Guinea
- Province: Morobe Province
- Time zone: UTC+10 (AEST)

Komba Rural LLG (formerly Seko Rural LLG) is a local-level government (LLG) of Morobe Province, Papua New Guinea.

== Wards ==
- 01. Zangang
- 02. Taknawe
- 03. Malandum
- 04. Mangam
- 05. Nakambuk
- 06. Somboru
- 07. Satwak
- 08. Langa
- 09. Saune/Kopa
- 10. Waran
- 11. Indagen
- 12. Musep
- 13. Geraun
- 14. Konge
- 15. Ununu
- 16. Sikam
- 17. Kambuk
- 18. Sape
- 19. Gumum
