= Kamano language =

Goroka language spoken in Papua New Guinea

Kamano
- Native to: Papua New Guinea
- Region: Eastern Highlands Province
- Native speakers: (63,000 cited 2000 census)
- Language family: Trans–New Guinea: Kainantu–Goroka; Goroka; Kamano–Yagaria; Kamano

Language codes
- ISO 639-3: kbq
- Glottolog: kama1370

Kamano (Kamano-Kafe) is a Papuan language spoken in Eastern Highlands Province, Papua New Guinea.

== Nomenclature ==
The terms 'Kamano' and 'Kamano-Kafe' are both used to refer to the language primarily spoken in Henganofi District, although within the linguistics literature Kamano refers to some varieties within the Kamano-Yagaria group, a dialect chain of Eastern Highlands Province

== Phonology ==
=== Consonants ===
| | | Labial | Alveolar | Velar | Glottal |
|---|---|---|---|---|---|
| Stop | voiceless | p | t | k | ʔ |
| Stop | prenasal | ᵐp | ⁿt | ᵑk | |
| Stop | voiced | | | ɡ | |
| Fricative | voiceless | f | s | | h |
| Fricative | voiced | β | z | | |
| Nasal | | m | n | | |
| Tap | | | ɾ | | |

- Consonant sounds /p t k m n z/ can have preglottalized sounds [ˀp ˀt ˀk ˀm ˀn ˀz] occurring word-medially.
- The phoneme /f/ can be in free fluctuation with a voiceless bilabial fricative [ɸ].

=== Vowels ===
| | Front | Central | Back |
|---|---|---|---|
| High | i | | u |
| Mid | e | | o |
| Low | | a | |

- /e/ can occur as [ɛ] word-initially or word-medially.
- /a/ can occur word initially as [ʌ].

== Clause chaining ==
Kamano Kafe exhibits a unique form of the clause chaining system often described in Papuan languages. Clause chaining in Papuan languages typically involves one or more medial verbs with limited morphological possibilities being under the scope of a more fully inflected final verb. The medial verbs in these clause chains typically use a switch reference system and various degrees of agreement with final verbs. The Kamano system, unlike other clause chaining systems in New Guinea, has requisite person and number agreement with the subjects of higher clauses. A typical example is given below.

Nägra tr-o-ge-nka, kägra tr-an-ke-no', ägra tre-'n-i-e
I leave-1P.SG-SR-B.2P.SG you leave-2P.SG-SR-B.3P.SG he leave-PERF-3P.SG-IND
"I left, then you left, then he left."
