= Kamano No. 1 Rural LLG =

Local-level government in Papua New Guinea

- Country: Papua New Guinea
- Province: Eastern Highlands Province
- Time zone: UTC+10 (AEST)

District map of Eastern Highlands Province

Kamano No. 1 Rural LLG is a local-level government (LLG) of Eastern Highlands Province, Papua New Guinea. The Kamano language is spoken in the LLG.

== Wards ==
- 01. Onampinka
- 02. Taranofi
- 03. Iva
- 04. Omena
- 05. Ino'onka
- 06. Bush Kamano
