= Mao Zeming =

Papua New Guinean politician

Mao Zeming CMG (born 11 November 1963) is a Papua New Guinean politician. He served as Deputy Prime Minister from December 1999 to November 2000.

== Early life ==
He was raised in the New Guinea Highlands. After studying motor mechanics for his tertiary education in Goroka, he enrolled as an officer cadet in 1983 at the Papua New Guinea Defence Academy in Lae.

== Political career ==
He was first elected to Parliament in a by-election in July 1995, representing the Tewai-Siassi constituency (in Morobe Province). In July 1997, Prime Minister Bill Skate appointed him Minister for Defence, then reshuffled him in December to the position of Minister for Housing. Skate briefly shuffled him to the position of Minister for Forests in July 1998, then back to Minister for Housing in October. Out of the Cabinet from June 1999, he was back in it from December, this time under Prime Minister Mekere Morauta, as Deputy Prime Minister and Minister for Agriculture and Livestock. He held the position until November 2000, when Morauta sacked him, accusing him of disloyalty.

In April 2003, the Leadership Tribunal found Zeming guilty on nine charges "relating to use of his discretionary funds to pay companies owned or controlled by his associates". On recommendation of the Tribunal, which deemed him "unworthy to continue in office" for his mishandling of millions of kina, he was dismissed from Parliament in May by the Governor-General.

Returning to Parliament in the 2012 general election, as a member of incumbent Prime Minister Peter O'Neill's People's National Congress Party, he was appointed Minister for Fisheries and Marine Resources. In June 2015, he was made a Companion of the Order of St Michael and St George "for services to the community and to politics".

Political offices
Preceded by John Pundari	Deputy Prime Minister of Papua New Guinea; 1999–2000	Succeeded by Michael Ogio
