= Paul Pora =

Minister of Finance of Papua New Guinea from 1988 to 1992

7th Minister of Finance of Papua New Guinea
- In office 4 July 1988 – 17 July 1992
- Preceded by: Geleva Kwarara
- Succeeded by: Julius Chan

Personal details
- Born: Paul Pora; Unknown Western Highlands Province, Territory of New Guinea (now Papua New Guinea)
- Died: 22 October 2010 Port Moresby, Papua New Guinea
- Spouse: 4 wives
- Children: 17
- Education: University of Papua New Guinea

Paul Pora Schmidt was a Papua New Guinean businessman and politician who served as minister of finance between 1988 and 1992.

== Early life ==
Pora was born at Tega Village, near Mount Hagen, in what is now the Western Highlands Province of Papua New Guinea. There is some confusion about his year of birth, with one source suggesting that it was 1946, but it seems more likely that it was 1944. He was said to have been 66 when he died in 2010. Pora was the son of an Australian patrol officer, Dal (Dalkeith) Chambers, who was officer-in-charge at Mount Hagen, and of Rok, who came from the Yamuga tribe of that area. Because of World War II, Australians were required to leave New Guinea. Rok had been pregnant at the time. After the war, Chambers returned to search for his child but Pora was apparently hidden from him, his mother having subsequently married. The name of “Schmidt”, used by Pora, was apparently in honour of a Lutheran missionary who had taught him to read and write and not, as suggested by some, the name of his father.

== Early education ==
From a young age Pora had a hunger for education. This saw him undertake a lengthy walk from his home village to the Ogelbeng Lutheran station to go to school. The following year he had to go further afield, to a Lutheran school in Chuave in Simbu Province. After that, he was sent by plane and boat to the Lutheran-run Hejlsberg School at Finschhafen on the north coast of New Guinea in the Morobe Province from 1953-1958. He then transferred on his request to Bughandi High School in Lae, before being awarded a scholarship to attend school in Australia, despite being above the qualifying age. He completed his school education at Sogeri National High School.

== Later education and early career ==
Pora joined the Reserve Bank of Australia. After a year, he was sponsored by the bank to receive university education and was one of the second year's intake of the newly established University of Papua New Guinea, with fellow students including the future prime minister of Papua New Guinea, Rabbie Namaliu. He graduated with a Bachelor of Economics degree. Returning to the Reserve Bank after graduation, Pora was later employed as the clerk of the Mount Hagen town council. Among his other activities was to establish Wamp Nga Holdings as a business arm of the council. This proved to be very successful and still functions today.

== Marriage ==
Pora married Hilan Sikot in September 1968. She was the only female member of the Bully Beef Club of 26 who founded the Pangu Party, which was to form the government after Independence. She was the first female interpreter for the Australian Administration in the House of Assembly in 1967.

== Business activities ==
Pora and his wife began business activities during their courting years at Dobel which was a swamp that would become a coffee plantation. They went on to formally register Dobel Farming and Trading Ltd in 1976, six months after Papua New Guinea gained Independence, expanding the business to include trading and trucking. He came to be known as the first "multi-millionaire" of the Western Highlands. His business acumen was soon widely recognised and he was made the first chairman of the national airline, Air Niugini, chairman of the National Broadcasting Corporation of Papua New Guinea, and a member of PNG's Constitutional Review Commission.

== Politics ==
Pora entered politics in the 1980s. He was elected to the national parliament in the 1987 general election, for the Hagen Open seat and was appointed as a member of the Economic Affairs Committee in March 1988. After a change of government in July 1988 he was made minister of finance by Namaliu. His tenure coincided with the civil war in Bougainville, which led to the closure of the Panguna mine and significant loss of revenue to the government of Papua New Guinea. Pora was in charge of balancing the budget in this difficult period. Re-elected in the 1992 general election he was minister for civil aviation and tourism from August 1994 to July 1995. He was re-elected in the 1997 general election.

Pora developed a reputation as a peacemaker in an area of Papua New Guinea known for tribal fighting. In the 2002 national election his loss was attributed by supporters to the disappearance of ballot boxes from areas loyal to Pora and they were threatening to take violent action. He persuaded them to return home quietly. In another example, a politician from Enga province was murdered in Mount Hagen. A convoy of people from Enga headed to Mount Hagen in order to exact revenge but were met by Pora and the victim’s father and persuaded not to take the violent action they had planned.

== Death ==
In the last 10 years of his life, Pora retired from work and business and lived in a suburb of PNG's capital, Port Moresby. He died on 22 October 2010, reportedly of asthma. He had been a heavy smoker. He was survived by Hilan and their four children who continue to operate family businesses, including coffee production and marketing, and three other wives and 13 children. His eldest son, a pilot, would die not long after his death.
