= Albert Kipalan =

Politician in Papua New Guinea

- Born: Enga Province, Papua New Guinea
- Died: August 4, 2008; Port Moresby, Papua New Guinea
- Occupations: Politician and businessman
- Known for: Unsuccessful candidate to become Governor-General of Papua New Guinea
- Spouse: Rita Kipalan
- Children: Eleven

Sir Albert Kipalan KBE (19?? – 2008) was a member of the parliament of Papua New Guinea (PNG) between 1982 and 1997 and served as a government minister in several positions. He is best known for having been elected to the position of Governor-General of Papua New Guinea, only to be barred from taking up the position after legal appeals.

== Early life ==
Kipalan came from Enga Province in PNG. As a young boy, he worked in his own vegetable garden to pay for his education. He then went to Fatima high school in the Western Highlands Province.

== Political career ==
Kipalan became a magistrate and was elected in 1982 as a member of the national parliament for the Wabag constituency, beating the incumbent, Sir Tei Abal, who had held the post since 1964. He was re-elected in 1987 and 1992 but defeated in 1997. He would later support Abal's son, Sam Abal, to win the same seat. While in parliament he served as Minister of Justice of Papua New Guinea, and in other posts.

Kipalan is best known for having been elected by parliament as Governor-General, only to fail to take up the position as a result of various legal appeals. At the first ballot, in September 2003, he was elected to the post by 46 votes to the 45 of his opponent in the 100-seat parliament. However, the country's supreme court ruled that Parliament had breached procedures when it elected Kipalan, and ordered a fresh vote. This was won by Sir Pato Kakaraya, who beat Kipalan by 52 to 39, which prompted a fresh legal challenge by Kipalan, claiming that the parliamentary clerk had accepted defective nomination forms after the closure time for nominations and that there had been attempts by Kakaraya's supporters to bribe members of parliament. This challenge to the supreme court was successful, prompting a constitutional crisis and threats of violence. In May 2004, Sir Paulias Matane was elected to the position and became the Governor-General, despite further threats of legal action.

== Honours and awards ==
In May 2007, the Goilala people of the area in which Kipalan had made his home near Port Moresby granted him paramount chief status, an event described by the Papua New Guinea Post Courier as "the impossible" because Kipalan came from the Highlands of Papua New Guinea and the Goilala are coastal people. Kipalan had lived in the Goilala area since his defeat in the 1992 elections and had worked to help the Goilala people.

In the 1993 Birthday Honours he was made a Knight Bachelor for services to politics and public services.

== Death ==
Kipalan died from a heart attack on 4 August 2008. He was buried on a small hill in front of his house at 8 Mile, near Port Moresby. He had eleven children with three wives. One of his daughters became a doctor; another a pilot with the national airline, Air Niugini. She was also married to a pilot. Another son-in-law was a helicopter pilot and it was Kipalan's wish, fulfilled, that one son-in-law would fly his body to Mount Hagen and the other would then complete the journey by helicopter to Wabag for the funeral.
