= Imbonggu District =

- Location within Papua New Guinea
- Coordinates: 6°06′S 144°10′E
- Country: Papua New Guinea
- Province: Southern Highlands
- Capital: Imbonggu

Area
  - Total: 1,032 km^{2} (398 sq mi)

Population (2011 census)
  - Total: 80,994
  - Density: 78.48/km^{2} (203.3/sq mi)
- Time zone: UTC+10 (AEST)

Imbonggu District is a district of the Southern Highlands Province of Papua New Guinea. Its capital currently is Walume, but previously it was Ialibu Station. The population was 80,994 at the 2011 census.
