= Esa'ala District =

- Location within Papua New Guinea
- Coordinates: 9.729°S 150.789°E
- Country: Papua New Guinea
- Province: Milne Bay Province
- Capital: Esa'ala

Government
  - MP: Jimmy Maladina

Area
  - Total: 2,322 km^{2} (897 sq mi)

Population (2011 census)
  - Total: 54,467
  - Density: 23.46/km^{2} (60.75/sq mi)
- Time zone: UTC+10 (AEST)

Esa'ala District is a district of the Milne Bay Province of Papua New Guinea. Its capital is Esa'ala. The population of the district was 54,467 at the 2011 census.
