= Nuku District, Papua New Guinea =

Nuku District
- Location within Papua New Guinea
- Coordinates: 3°40′S 142°28′E
- Country: Papua New Guinea
- Province: Sandaun Province
- Capital: Nuku

Area
  - Total: 3,503 km^{2} (1,353 sq mi)

Population (2024 census)
  - Total: 83,568
  - Density: 23.86/km^{2} (61.79/sq mi)
- Time zone: UTC+10 (AEST)

Nuku District is a district of Sandaun Province of Papua New Guinea. Its capital is Nuku. Nuku District is a major center of Torricelli linguistic diversity.
