= Tari-Pori District =

- Location within Papua New Guinea
- Coordinates: 5°51′S 142°57′E
- Country: Papua New Guinea
- Province: Hela
- Capital: Tari

Government
  - MP: James Marape

Area
  - Total: 1,298 km^{2} (501 sq mi)

Population (2011 census)
  - Total: 83,076
  - Density: 64.00/km^{2} (165.8/sq mi)
- Time zone: UTC+10 (AEST)

Tari-Pori District is a district of the Hela Province of Papua New Guinea. Its capital is Tari. The population was 83,076 at the 2011 census.
