= Mul-Baiyer District =

- Location within Papua New Guinea
- Coordinates: 5°33′S 143°48′E
- Country: Papua New Guinea
- Province: Western Highlands Province
- Capital: Baiyer

Area
  - Total: 1,376 km^{2} (531 sq mi)

Population (2011 census)
  - Total: 83,036
  - Density: 60.35/km^{2} (156.3/sq mi)
- Time zone: UTC+10 (AEST)

Mul-Baiyer District is a district of the Western Highlands Province of Papua New Guinea. Its capital is Baiyer. The population of the district was 83,036 at the 2011 census.
