= Vanimo-Green River District =

- Location within Papua New Guinea
- Coordinates: 2°41′S 141°17′E
- Country: Papua New Guinea
- Province: Sandaun Province
- Capital: Vanimo

Area
  - Total: 10,295 km^{2} (3,975 sq mi)

Population (2024 census)
  - Total: 112,314
  - Density: 10.910/km^{2} (28.256/sq mi)
- Time zone: UTC+10 (AEST)

Vanimo-Green River District is a district of Sandaun Province of Papua New Guinea. Its capital is Vanimo.
