= Usino Bundi District =

- Location within Papua New Guinea
- Coordinates: 5.499°S 145.434°E
- Country: Papua New Guinea
- Province: Madang Province
- Capital: Usino

Area
  - Total: 7,109 km^{2} (2,745 sq mi)

Population (2024 census)
  - Total: 98,272
  - Density: 13.82/km^{2} (35.80/sq mi)
- Time zone: UTC+10 (AEST)

Usino Bundi District is a district in the south of Madang Province in Papua New Guinea. It is one of the six administrative districts that make up the province.
