= North Waghi District =

- Location within Papua New Guinea
- Coordinates: 5°47′S 144°37′E
- Country: Papua New Guinea
- Province: Jiwaka Province
- Capital: Banz

Area
  - Total: 453 km^{2} (175 sq mi)

Population (2011 census)
  - Total: 78,499
  - Density: 173/km^{2} (449/sq mi)
- Time zone: UTC+10 (AEST)

North Waghi District is a district of the Jiwaka Province of Papua New Guinea. Its capital is Banz. The population of the district was 78,499 at the 2011 census. Before May 2012, it was part of the Western Highlands Province.

== Government ==
The North Waghi District is represented in the National Parliament by Davide Mongelli, who was elected in the 2022 general election.
