= Gazelle District =

- Location within Papua New Guinea
- Coordinates: 4.3502°S 152.0418°E
- Country: Papua New Guinea
- Province: East New Britain Province
- Capital: Kerevat

Area
  - Total: 3,700 km^{2} (1,400 sq mi)

Population (2011 census)
  - Total: 129,317
  - Density: 35/km^{2} (91/sq mi)
- Time zone: UTC+10 (AEST)

Gazelle District is one of four administrative districts that make up the province of East New Britain Province in Papua New Guinea. The headquarters of Gazelle district is located in Kerevat town, located approximately 35 km from Kokopo, the province's main commercial center.

== See also ==
- Districts of Papua New Guinea
