= Tambul-Nebilyer District =

Tambul-Nebilyer District West Kange/Tambul Ice
- Location within Papua New Guinea
- Coordinates: 5.925°S 144.011°E
- Country: Papua New Guinea
- Province: Western Highlands Province
- Capital: Tambul

Area
  - Total: 1,824 km^{2} (704 sq mi)

Population (2011 census)
  - Total: 75,499
  - Density: 41.39/km^{2} (107.2/sq mi)
- Time zone: UTC+10 (AEST)

Tambul-Nebilyer District is a district of the Western Highlands Province of Papua New Guinea. Its capital is Tambul. The population of the district was 75,499 at the 2011 census. it has 3 LLG wards, they are Nebilyer Rural LLG, Mt. Giluwe Rural LLG and Lower Kaguel Rural LLG. In these district the most beautiful and the second largest mountain called Mt Giluwe is found there.
