= Lufa District =

- Location within Papua New Guinea
- Coordinates: 6°21′S 145°20′E
- Country: Papua New Guinea
- Province: Eastern Highlands
- Capital: Lufa

Area
  - Total: 1,358 km^{2} (524 sq mi)

Population (2011 census)
  - Total: 61,057
  - Density: 44.96/km^{2} (116.4/sq mi)
- Time zone: UTC+10 (AEST)

Lufa District is a district of the Eastern Highlands Province in Papua New Guinea. Its capital is Lufa.

Lufa experienced first European contact in the late 1930s.
