= Rabaul District =

- Location within Papua New Guinea
- Coordinates: 4.2004°S 152.1644°E
- Country: Papua New Guinea
- Province: East New Britain Province
- Capital: Rabaul

Government
  - MP: Graham Piniau Rumet (Pangu Pati)

Area
  - Total: 95 km^{2} (37 sq mi)

Population (2011 census)
  - Total: 39,387
  - Density: 410/km^{2} (1,100/sq mi)
- Time zone: UTC+10 (AEST)

Rabaul District is a district of East New Britain Province in Papua New Guinea. It is one of the four administrative districts that make up the province.

== Election results ==
2022 Papua New Guinean general election: Rabaul Open
| Party | Candidate | Votes | % | ±% |
|---|---|---|---|---|
| MLP | Allan Marat | 4,317 | 32.89 | −17.92 |
| Pangu Pati | Graham Piniau Rumet | 2,669 | 20.34 | +20.34 |
| ULP | Raymond Paulias | 2,344 | 17.86 | +17.86 |
| NAP | Wayne Coleman Tamsak | 1,281 | 9.76 | −26.80 |
| URP | Taupa Puipui | 999 | 7.61 | +7.61 |
| Future of PNG Party | David Graham | 835 | 6.36 | +6.36 |
| Independent | Simon Rico Kaumi | 383 | 2.92 | +2.92 |
| People's Party | Francis Tavatuna | 235 | 1.79 | +1.79 |
| Independent | Ekonia Tukau | 61 | 0.46 | +0.46 |
| Total formal votes | | 13,124 | 95.27 | |
| Informal votes | | 651 | 4.73 | |
| Turnout | | 13,775 | | |
Two-party-preferred result
| Pangu Pati | Graham Piniau Rumet | 5,192 | 50.01 | +50.01 |
| MLP | Allan Marat | 5,189 | 49.99 | |
| Pangu Pati gain from MLP | | Swing | +50.01 | |

== See also ==
- Districts of Papua New Guinea
