= Wabag District =

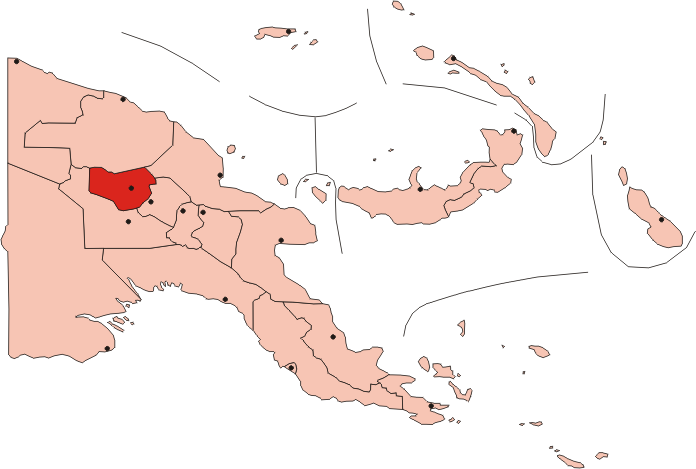
- Location of Enga Province

- Location within Papua New Guinea
- Coordinates: 5.484°S 143.662°E
- Country: Papua New Guinea
- Province: Enga Province
- Capital: Wabag

Area
  - Total: 1,090 km^{2} (420 sq mi)

Population (2011 census)
  - Total: 73,649
  - Density: 67.6/km^{2} (175/sq mi)
- Time zone: UTC+10 (AEST)

Wabag District is a district of the Enga Province of Papua New Guinea. Its capital is Wabag. The population of the district was 73,649 at the 2011 census.
