= Kompiam District =

Kompiam District Merimanda
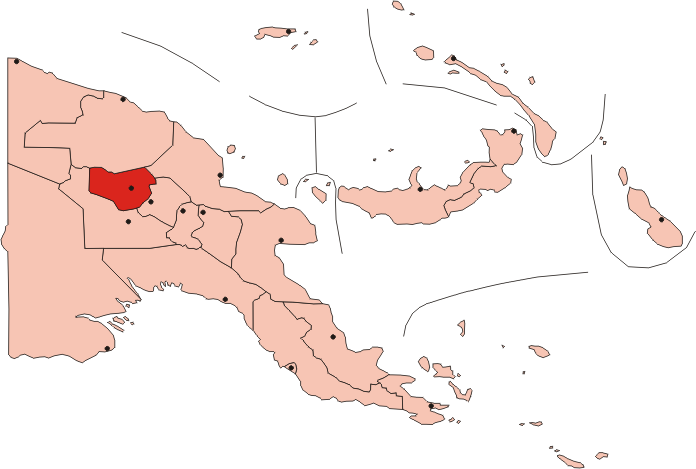
- Location of Enga Province

- Location within Papua New Guinea
- Coordinates: 5°19′53″S 143°55′08″E
- Country: Papua New Guinea
- Province: Enga Province
- Capital: Kompiam

Area
  - Total: 2,963 km^{2} (1,144 sq mi)

Population (2000)
  - Total: 54,624
  - Density: 18.44/km^{2} (47.75/sq mi)
- Time zone: UTC+10 (AEST)

Kompiam - Ambum District is a district of the Enga Province of Papua New Guinea. Its capital is Kompiam. The population of the district was 54,624 at the 2011 census.
