= Ialibu-Pangia District =

- Location within Papua New Guinea
- Coordinates: 6°15′S 143°59′E
- Country: Papua New Guinea
- Province: Southern Highlands
- Capital: Ialibu

Government
  - MP: Peter O'Neill

Area
  - Total: 2,412 km^{2} (931 sq mi)

Population (2011 census)
  - Total: 70,000
  - Density: 29/km^{2} (75/sq mi)
- Time zone: UTC+10 (AEST)

Ialibu-Pangia District is a district of the Southern Highlands Province of Papua New Guinea. Its capital is Ialibu. The population was 70,000 as of the 2015 census.
