= Talasea District =

- Location within Papua New Guinea
- Coordinates: 5.553°S 150.137°E
- Country: Papua New Guinea
- Province: West New Britain Province
- Capital: Kimbe

Government
  - MP: Francis Galia Maneke

Area
  - Total: 7,888 km^{2} (3,046 sq mi)

Population (2011 census)
  - Total: 189,999
  - Density: 24.09/km^{2} (62.39/sq mi)
- Time zone: UTC+10 (AEST)

Talasea District is a district of the West New Britain Province of Papua New Guinea. Its capital is Kimbe.
