= Kainantu District =

- Location within Papua New Guinea
- Coordinates: 6°17′S 145°52′E
- Country: Papua New Guinea
- Province: Eastern Highlands
- Capital: Kainantu

Area
  - Total: 989 km^{2} (382 sq mi)

Population (2011 census)
  - Total: 126,248
  - Density: 128/km^{2} (331/sq mi)
- Time zone: UTC+10 (AEST)

Kainantu District is a district of the Eastern Highlands Province in Papua New Guinea. Its capital is Kainantu.
