= Unggai-Benna District =

Unggai-Bena District
- Location within Papua New Guinea
- Coordinates: 5°50′S 145°50′E
- Country: Papua New Guinea
- Province: Eastern Highlands
- Capital: Bena

Area
  - Total: 922 km^{2} (356 sq mi)

Population (2011 census)
  - Total: 67,125
  - Density: 72.8/km^{2} (189/sq mi)
- Time zone: UTC+10 (AEST)

Unggai-Bena District is a district of the Eastern Highlands Province in Papua New Guinea. Its capital is Bena.
