= Wewak District =

- Location within Papua New Guinea
- Coordinates: 3.579°S 143.644°E
- Country: Papua New Guinea
- Province: East Sepik Province
- Capital: Wewak

Area
  - Total: 2,311 km^{2} (892 sq mi)

Population (2024 census)
  - Total: 123,329
  - Density: 53.37/km^{2} (138.2/sq mi)
- Time zone: UTC+10 (AEST)

Wewak District is a district of East Sepik Province in Papua New Guinea. It is one of the six administrative districts that make up the province. The main town is Wewak.

== See also ==
- Districts of Papua New Guinea
