= Huon District =

Huon District Huon Gulf District
- Location within Papua New Guinea
- Coordinates: 7°03′S 147°03′E
- Country: Papua New Guinea
- Province: Morobe Province
- Capital: Salamaua

Area
  - Total: 7,401 km^{2} (2,858 sq mi)

Population (2024 census)
  - Total: 124,505
  - Density: 16.82/km^{2} (43.57/sq mi)
- Time zone: UTC+10 (AEST)

Huon District (alternatively Huon Gulf District) is a district of the Morobe Province of Papua New Guinea. Its capital is Salamaua. The population of the district was 77,564 at the 2011 census.
