= Kerema District =

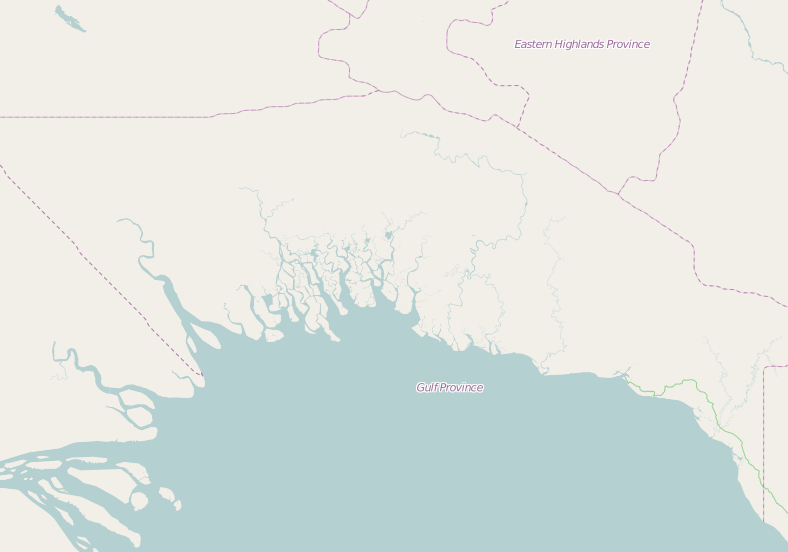
- Location within Gulf Province of Papua New Guinea.
- Coordinates: 7°58′S 145°46′E
- Country: Papua New Guinea
- Province: Gulf Province
- Capital: Kerema

Area
  - Total: 7,318 km^{2} (2,825 sq mi)

Population (2011 census)
  - Total: 107,231
  - Density: 14.65/km^{2} (37.95/sq mi)
- Time zone: UTC+10 (AEST)

Kerema District is a district of the Gulf Province of Papua New Guinea. Its capital is Kerema.
