= Nipa-Kutubu District =

- Location within Papua New Guinea
- Coordinates: 6°08′S 143°25′E
- Country: Papua New Guinea
- Province: Southern Highlands
- Capital: Nipa

Area
  - Total: 6,794 km^{2} (2,623 sq mi)

Population (2011 census)
  - Total: 147,005
  - Density: 21.64/km^{2} (56.04/sq mi)
- Time zone: UTC+10 (AEST)

Nipa-Kutubu District is a district of the Southern Highlands Province of Papua New Guinea. Its capital is Nipa. The population was 147,005 at the 2011 census. The district has the size of 7,667 square kilometres (2,960 mi^{2}).
