= Mount Hagen District =

Mount Hagen District Kulg Village in Hagen District of Western Highlands Province.
- Location within Papua New Guinea
- Coordinates: 5.846°S 144.223°E
- Country: Papua New Guinea
- Province: Western Highlands Province
- Capital: Mt. Hagen

Area
  - Total: 523 km^{2} (202 sq mi)

Population (2011 census)
  - Total: 123,299
  - Density: 236/km^{2} (611/sq mi)
- Time zone: UTC+10 (AEST)

Mount Hagen District is a district of the Western Highlands Province of Papua New Guinea. Its capital is Mount Hagen.

At the 2000 census, the population of the district was 86,517 (44,460 males, 42,057 females in 19,214 households):

- Subdistrict Mt. Hagen Rural: 58,735 (29,513 m, 29,222 f in 13,762 households)
- Subdistrict Mt. Hagen Urban: 27,782 (14,947 m, 12,835 f in 5,452 households)
