= Yangoru-Saussia District =

- Location within Papua New Guinea
- Coordinates: 3.766°S 143.42°E
- Country: Papua New Guinea
- Province: East Sepik Province
- Capital: Yangoru

Government
  - MP: Richard Maru

Area
  - Total: 2,587 km^{2} (999 sq mi)

Population (2024 census)
  - Total: 75,088
  - Density: 29.03/km^{2} (75.17/sq mi)
- Time zone: UTC+10 (AEST)

Yangoru-Saussia District is a district of East Sepik Province in Papua New Guinea. It is one of the six administrative districts that make up the province.

== See also ==
- Districts of Papua New Guinea
