= Komo-Magarima District =

Komo-Margarima District
- Location within Papua New Guinea
- Coordinates: 6°04′S 142°51′E
- Country: Papua New Guinea
- Province: Hela
- Capital: Margarima

Government
  - MP: Manasseh Makiba

Area
  - Total: 3,928 km^{2} (1,517 sq mi)

Population (2011 census)
  - Total: 132,746
  - Density: 33.79/km^{2} (87.53/sq mi)
- Time zone: UTC+10 (AEST)

Komo-Margarima District is a district of the Hela Province of Papua New Guinea. Its capital is Margarima. The population was 132,746 at the 2011 census.
