= Angoram District =

- Location within Papua New Guinea
- Coordinates: 4.0468°S 144.070°E
- Country: Papua New Guinea
- Province: East Sepik Province
- Capital: Angoram

Area
  - Total: 19,850 km^{2} (7,660 sq mi)

Population (2024 census)
  - Total: 133,211
  - Density: 6.711/km^{2} (17.38/sq mi)
- Time zone: UTC+10 (AEST)

Angoram District is a district of East Sepik Province in Papua New Guinea. It is one of the six administrative districts that make up the province. The main town in Angoram.

The Sepik River passes through it.

== See also ==
- Districts of Papua New Guinea
