= Wosera-Gawi District =

- Location within Papua New Guinea
- Coordinates: 4°28′S 143°14′E
- Country: Papua New Guinea
- Province: East Sepik Province
- Capital: Wosera

Area
  - Total: 3,129 km^{2} (1,208 sq mi)

Population (2024 census)
  - Total: 90,203
  - Density: 28.83/km^{2} (74.66/sq mi)
- Time zone: UTC+10 (AEST)

Wosera-Gawi District is a district of East Sepik Province in Papua New Guinea. It is one of the six administrative districts that make up the province.

== See also ==
- Districts of Papua New Guinea
