= Eastern Highlands Province =

Province in Papua New Guinea

Eastern Highlands Isten Hailans Provins (Tok Pisin)
- Flag

- Eastern Highlands Province in Papua New Guinea
- Coordinates: 6°4′20″S 145°23′39″E
- Country: Papua New Guinea
- Formation: 1966
- Capital: Goroka
- Districts: List: Daulo District; Goroka District; Henganofi District; Kainantu District; Lufa District; Obura-Wonenara District; Okapa District; Unggai-Bena District

Government
  - Governor: Simon Sia (since 2022)

Area
  - Total: 11,157 km^{2} (4,308 sq mi)

Population (2011 census)
  - Total: 579,825
  - Density: 51.970/km^{2} (134.60/sq mi)
- Time zone: UTC+10 (AEST)
- HDI (2018): 0.512 low · 18th of 22
- Website: ehp.gov.pg

Eastern Highlands is a highlands province of Papua New Guinea. The provincial capital is Goroka. The province covers an area of 11,157 km^{2}, and has a population of 579,825 (2011 census). The province shares a common administrative boundary with Madang Province to the north, Morobe Province to the east, Gulf Province to the south, and Simbu Province to the west. The province is the home of the Asaro mud mask that is displayed at shows and festivals within the province and in the country. The province is reachable by air, including Goroka Airport, and road transport, including the main Highlands Highway.

== Districts and LLGs ==
District map of Eastern Highlands Province

Each province in Papua New Guinea has one or more districts, and each district has one or more Local Level Government (LLG) areas. For census purposes, the LLG areas are subdivided into wards and those into census units.

District	District Capital	LLG Name
Daulo District	Asaro	Watabung Rural
Daulo District	Asaro	Lower Asaro Rural
Daulo District	Asaro	Upper Asaro Rural
Goroka District	Goroka	Gahuku Rural
Goroka District	Goroka	Goroka Urban
Goroka District	Goroka	Mimanalo Rural
Henganofi District	Henganofi	Kafentina Rural
Henganofi District	Henganofi	Dunantina Rural
Henganofi District	Henganofi	Fayantina Rural
Kainantu District	Kainantu	Kainantu Urban
Kainantu District	Kainantu	Kamano 1 Rural
Kainantu District	Kainantu	Kamano 2 Rural
Kainantu District	Kainantu	Agarabi
Kainantu District	Kainantu	Gadsup-Tairora Rural
Lufa District	Lufa	Yagaria Rural
Lufa District	Lufa	Mount Michael Rural
Lufa District	Lufa	Unavi Rural
Obura-Wonenara District	Lamari	Lamari Rural
Obura-Wonenara District	Lamari	Yelia Rural
Okapa District	Okapa	East Okapa Rural
Okapa District	Okapa	West Okapa Rural
Unggai-Benna District	Benna	Lower Benna Rural
Unggai-Benna District	Benna	Upper Benna Rural
Unggai-Benna District	Benna	Unggai Rural

== Demography ==
Eastern Highland Province had a population of 432,972 (PNG citizens) and 1,173 (non-citizens) in the 2000 Census. This is an increase of 31% since the 1990 Census figure.

== Provincial leaders ==
The province was governed by a decentralised provincial administration, headed by a Regional Member, from 1977 to 1995. Following reforms taking effect that year, the national government reassumed some powers, and the role of Regional Member was replaced by a position of Governor, to be held by the winner of the province-wide seat in the National Parliament of Papua New Guinea.

=== Premiers (1976–1995) ===
Premier	Term
James Yanepa	1976–1986
Walter Nombe	1986–1991
Robert Atiyafa	1991–1995 (Currently he is an Open Member for Henganofi, 2025)

=== Governors (1995–present) ===
Governor	Term
Aita Ivarato	1995–1997
Peti Lafanama	1997–1998
Damson Lafana	1998–2000
Peti Lafanama	2000–2002
Malcolm Kela Smith	2002–2012
Julie Soso	2012–2017
Peter Numu	2017–2022
Simon Sia	2022–current

== Members of the National Parliament ==
The province and each district is represented by a Member of the National Parliament. There is one provincial electorate and each district is an open electorate.

Electorate	Member
Eastern Highlands Provincial	Simon Sia
Daulo Open	Ekime Gorosahu
Goroka Open	Aiye Tambua
Henganofi Open	Robert Atiyafa
Kainantu Open	William Hagahuno
Lufa Open	Simo Kilepa
Obura-Wonenara Open	John Boito
Okapa Open	Saki Soloma
Unggai-Bena Open	Kinoka Hotune
