= Obura-Wonenara District =

- Location within Papua New Guinea
- Coordinates: 6.9743°S 145.8881°E
- Country: Papua New Guinea
- Province: Eastern Highlands
- Capital: Aiyura

Area
  - Total: 3,916 km^{2} (1,512 sq mi)

Population (2011 census)
  - Total: 39,919
  - Density: 10.19/km^{2} (26.40/sq mi)
- Time zone: UTC+10 (AEST)

Obura-Wonenara District is a district of the Eastern Highlands Province in Papua New Guinea. Its capital is Aiyura.

== Politics ==
In the 2007 national elections, their newly elected MP was John Boito (on 2011 August 9 when Peter O'Neill took office from Grand Chief Sir Micheal Somare (due to Somare's illness) as the interim PM of Papua New Guinea, he (Boito) became the 9th Police Minister of Papua New Guinea government for 10 months before the elections). He served the people of Obura-Wonenara for five years. However, in the 2012 national general elections, he lost the seat to Mehrra Minne Kipefa. In 2022, he was announced as the elected MP and is currently serving in his capacity as the MP for this District.
