= Anglimp-South Waghi District =

- Location within Papua New Guinea
- Coordinates: 5.8809°S 144.7071°E
- Country: Papua New Guinea
- Province: Jiwaka Province
- Capital: Minj

Area
  - Total: 1,970 km^{2} (760 sq mi)

Population (2011 census)
  - Total: 194,109
  - Density: 98.5/km^{2} (255/sq mi)
- Time zone: UTC+10 (AEST)

Anglimp-South Wahgi District is a district of the Jiwaka Province of Papua New Guinea. Its capital is Minj. The population of the district was 194,109 at the 2011 census. Before May 2012, it was part of the Western Highlands Province.
