= Kagua-Erave District =

Kagua-Erave District Paripa -Poleambu
- Location within Papua New Guinea
- Coordinates: 6°19′S 143°50′E
- Country: Papua New Guinea
- Province: Southern Highlands
- Capital: Kagua

Area
  - Total: 3,497 km^{2} (1,350 sq mi)

Population (2011 census)
  - Total: 74,139
  - Density: 21.20/km^{2} (54.91/sq mi)
- Time zone: UTC+10 (AEST)

Kagua-Erave District is a district of the Southern Highlands Province of Papua New Guinea. Its capital is Kagua. The population was 74,139 at the 2011 census.

The main LLG consists of Aiya (Wabi - Sumi), Kagua Central, Kuare, Erave, and is the home to the Kewabi speakers. It borders Nipa/Lake Kutubu, Ialibu/Pangia Districts in Southern Highlands. It also shares a provincial border with Hela and Gulf provinces. Most basic services such as schools, health services and bridges are less or non existent in remote parts. Politicians have failed to deliver basic services and this results in divisions among tribes. It is the home to the Gobe oil fields but no development. The biggest high schools are Kagua, Kuare & Erave High Schools. Just one underfunded health sub center in Kagua. Major LLG areas are Usa, Sumi, Wabi, Karia, Koali - Lombo, Kuare, Mendo, Sugu Valley, Katiloma, Semberigi, Puputao, Wapisale, Seven Kona.
