= Kiriwina-Goodenough District =

- Location within Papua New Guinea
- Coordinates: 8°30′S 151°04′E
- Country: Papua New Guinea
- Province: Milne Bay Province
- Capital: Kiriwina

Area
  - Total: 1,107 km^{2} (427 sq mi)

Population (2011 census)
  - Total: 63,916
  - Density: 57.74/km^{2} (149.5/sq mi)
- Time zone: UTC+10 (AEST)

Kiriwina-Goodenough District is a district of the Milne Bay Province of Papua New Guinea. Its capital is Kiriwina. The population of the district was 63,916 at the 2011 census.
