= Finschhafen District =

- Satellite view

- Location within Papua New Guinea
- Coordinates: 6°36′S 147°51′E
- Country: Papua New Guinea
- Province: Morobe Province
- Capital: Finschhafen
- LLGs: List: Hube Rural LLG; Kotte Rural LLG

Government
  - MP: Rainbo Paita

Area
  - Total: 2,642 km^{2} (1,020 sq mi)

Population (2024 census)
  - Total: 73,629
  - Density: 27.87/km^{2} (72.18/sq mi)
- Time zone: UTC+10 (AEST)

Finschhafen is a district on the north-east coast of the Morobe province of Papua New Guinea. It is named after the port town of the same name, Finschhafen.

The port was discovered (for Europeans) in 1884 by the German researcher Otto Finsch. In 1885 the German colony of German New Guinea created a town on the site and named it after the discoverer (-hafen = -harbor). Evangelical Lutheran missionaries, organized by Johann Flierl, settled near the town, establishing a Mission station at Simbang, and later at Sattelberg, approximately 5 kilometres (3 mi) away. Malaria was the bane of the town from the start. An epidemic in 1891 caused the colonists to briefly leave and only to return and then leave again ten years later in 1901. Other New Guinea towns were favoured instead, especially Rabaul.

During the Second World War Finschhafen was fought over by Japan and Australia, along with the United States. The Japanese first occupied the town on 10 March 1942. Australian forces, as part of US Rear Admiral Daniel E. Barbey's task force, landed nearby and seized the town in October 1943. (See New Guinea campaigns.)

Many of the original houses were destroyed during the war, and the city was re-developed somewhat further away, in the proximity of the military airport built by the Japanese. The airport was established as an important base for the US Army. Today this airport is used for civilian use (designation FIN).

The district is commonly spelled "Finschaffen" in PNG media. The US World War II base is usually written as "Finschafen" and occasionally "Finschaven" is also used.
