= Chuave District =

- Location within Papua New Guinea
- Coordinates: 6°10′S 145°05′E
- Country: Papua New Guinea
- Province: Chimbu Province
- Capital: Chuave

Area
  - Total: 550 km^{2} (210 sq mi)

Population (2011 census)
  - Total: 39,021
  - Density: 71/km^{2} (180/sq mi)
- Time zone: UTC+10 (AEST)

Chuave District is a district of the Simbu Province of Papua New Guinea. Its capital is Chuave. The population was 39,021 at the 2011 census.
