= Goroka District =

- Location within Papua New Guinea
- Coordinates: 6.08232°S 145.39030°E
- Country: Papua New Guinea
- Province: Eastern Highlands
- Capital: Goroka

Area
  - Total: 296 km^{2} (114 sq mi)

Population (2011 census)
  - Total: 103,396
  - Density: 349/km^{2} (905/sq mi)
- Time zone: UTC+10 (AEST)
- Website: www.gorokadistrict.com

Goroka District is a district in the Eastern Highlands Province of Papua New Guinea. It contains the city of Goroka.

The Alekano language is spoken there.
