= Dei District =

- Location within Papua New Guinea
- Coordinates: 5.8435°S 144.2464°E
- Country: Papua New Guinea
- Province: Western Highlands Province
- Capital: Muglamp

Area
  - Total: 576 km^{2} (222 sq mi)

Population (2011 census)
  - Total: 81,016
  - Density: 141/km^{2} (364/sq mi)
- Time zone: UTC+10 (AEST)

Dei District is a district of the Western Highlands Province of Papua New Guinea. Its capital is Dei. The population of the district was 81,016 at the 2011 census.
