= Bulolo District =

- Location within Papua New Guinea
- Coordinates: 7.203°S 146.637°E
- Country: Papua New Guinea
- Province: Morobe Province
- Capital: Bulolo

Government
  - MP: Sam Basil Jr.

Area
  - Total: 3,245 km^{2} (1,253 sq mi)

Population (2024 census)
  - Total: 95,760
  - Density: 29.51/km^{2} (76.43/sq mi)
- Time zone: UTC+10 (AEST)

Bulolo District is a district of the Morobe Province of Papua New Guinea. Its capital is Bulolo. The population of the district was 101,568 at the 2011 census. The district was represented in parliament by Sam Basil.
