= Sohe District =

- Location within Papua New Guinea
- Coordinates: 8°25′S 147°53′E
- Country: Papua New Guinea
- Province: Oro Province
- Capital: Sohe

Government
  - Member of Parliament: Henry Amuli

Area
  - Total: 10,026 km^{2} (3,871 sq mi)

Population (2011 census)
  - Total: 86,547
  - Density: 8.6323/km^{2} (22.357/sq mi)
- Time zone: UTC+10 (AEST)

Sohe District is a district of the Oro Province of Papua New Guinea. Its capital is Kokoda. The population was 86,547 at the 2011 census.

In 2017, St. Andrew's First Aid Australia commenced first aid support to the villages along the Kokoda track. They presented their highest citation to Havala Laula, the last of the WWII Fuzzy Wuzzy Angels at a ceremony in Melbourne's Heroes Club in March of that same year. The Governor General of Australia General Sir Peter Cosgrove, AK, MC presented Havala with the Governor General of Australia's Medallion on ANZAC Day in PNG as part of the 75th Anniversary Commemorations of the Battle of Milne Bay.

In 2018, St. Andrew's First Aid Australia in conjunction with The Weary Dunlop Foundation have joined together to raise funds to send trained first aid instructors to go to the Kokoda Track and teach the locals first aid. The Member for Sohe District Mr Henry Amuli, MP has thrown his support behind the project by supporting the inbound team.
