= Alotau District =

- Location within Papua New Guinea
- Coordinates: 7°58′S 145°46′E
- Country: Papua New Guinea
- Province: Milne Bay Province
- Capital: Alotau

Government
  - MP: Hon. Ricky Morris

Area
  - Total: 7,835 km^{2} (3,025 sq mi)

Population (2011 census)
  - Total: 99,539
  - Density: 12.70/km^{2} (32.90/sq mi)
- Time zone: UTC+10 (AEST)

Alotau District is a district of the Milne Bay Province of Papua New Guinea.

== Location, LLGs and wards ==
Alotau District shares a border with Oro and Central provinces. It comprises 7 LLGs and 157 wards:

- Alotau urban (6 wards - the district seat).
- Daga (18 wards)
- Huhu (29 wards)
- Makamaka (27 wards)
- Maramatana (19 wards)
- Weraura (30 wards)
- Suau (28 wards)

== Population and area ==
According to the 2011 census, 99,539 people live in the district, in which 12 different languages are spoken. The total land area covers 7,970.3 square kilometers.

== Link ==
- Alotau District (official website)
