= Kikori District =

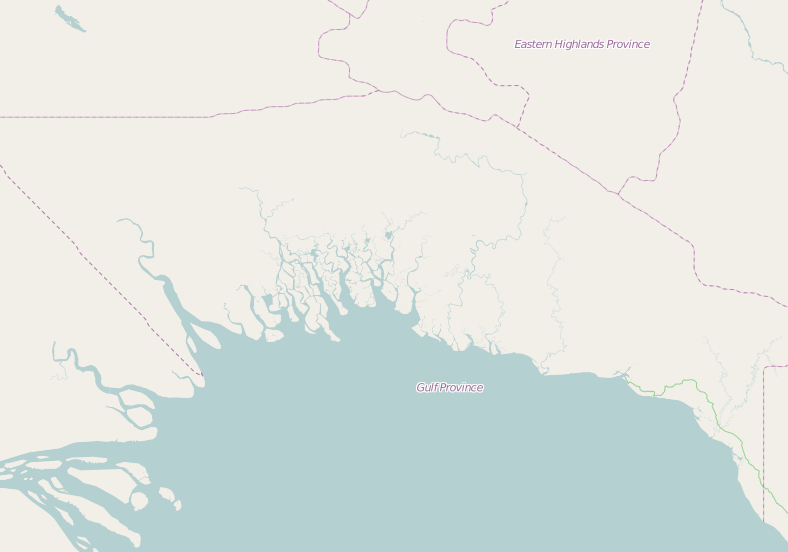
- Location within Papua New Guinea
- Coordinates: 7.409°S 144.238°E
- Country: Papua New Guinea
- Province: Gulf Province
- Capital: Kikori

Government
  - Open Member: Hon. Soroi Eoe CMG, MP

Area
  - Total: 27,154 km^{2} (10,484 sq mi)

Population (2011 census)
  - Total: 50,966
  - Density: 1.8769/km^{2} (4.8612/sq mi)
- Time zone: UTC+10 (AEST)

Kikori District is a district of the Gulf Province of Papua New Guinea. Its capital is Kikori.

== Politics ==
Since the first General Elections held in 1972 and for nearly 45 years, the Kikori Open Seat had consistently been represented by incumbents from West Kikori, Baimuru, and East Kikori Rural LLGs. The current incumbent, the Honorable Soroi Marepo Eoe CMG, MP is the first ever representative from the Ihu Rural LLG to win the Kikori Open Seat. The inaugural representative is Dodobai Wautai.
