= South Fly District =

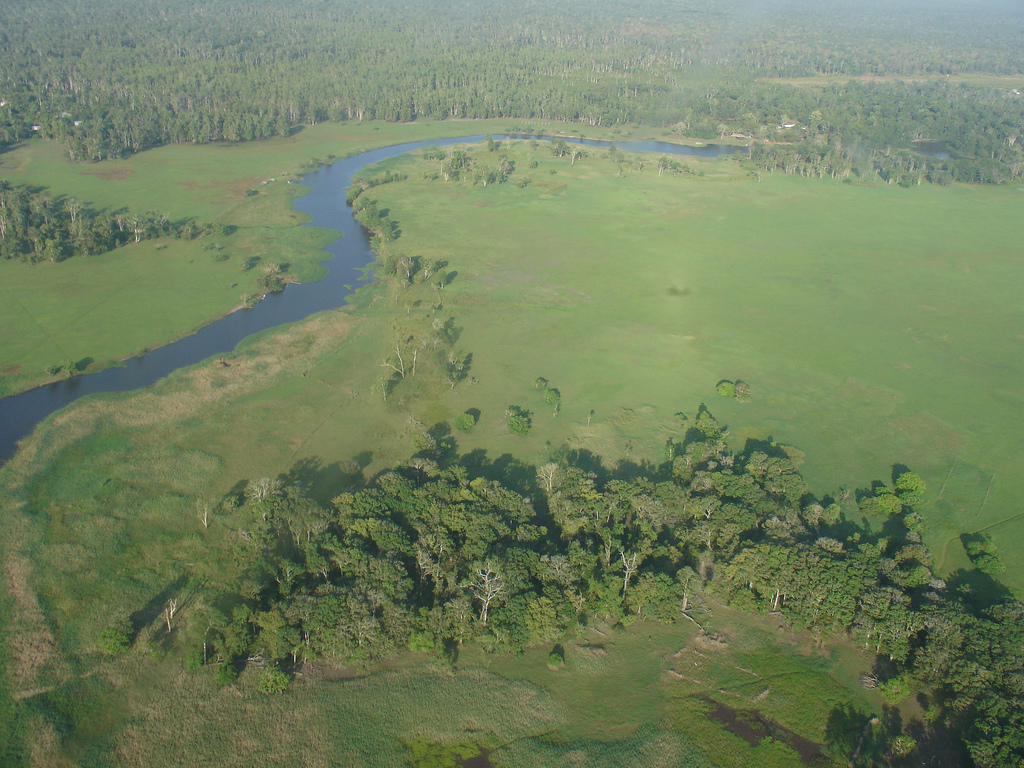
- Oblique aerial photograph in South Fly District

- Location within Papua New Guinea
- Coordinates: 8°41′S 142°14′E
- Country: Papua New Guinea
- Province: Western Province
- Capital: Daru

Area
  - Total: 31,864 km^{2} (12,303 sq mi)

Population (2011 census)
  - Total: 59,152
  - Density: 1.8564/km^{2} (4.8080/sq mi)
- Time zone: UTC+10 (AEST)

South Fly District is a district of the Western Province of Papua New Guinea. Its capital is Daru. The area of the district is 31,864 km², with a population of 46,407 at the 2000 census.

The district is administratively subdivided into four Local Level Government Areas:

1. Daru Urban
2. Kiwai Rural
3. Morehead Rural
4. Oriomo-Bituri Rural
