= Pomio District =

- Location within Papua New Guinea
- Coordinates: 5.522°S 151.539°E
- Country: Papua New Guinea
- Province: East New Britain Province
- Capital: Pomio

Area
  - Total: 11,071 km^{2} (4,275 sq mi)

Population (2011 census)
  - Total: 71,836
  - Density: 6.4887/km^{2} (16.806/sq mi)
- Time zone: UTC+10 (AEST)

Pomio District is a district of East New Britain Province in Papua New Guinea. It is one of the four administrative districts that make up the province.

== Languages ==
Papuan languages spoken in the district are Ata, Kol, and Sulka.

Austronesian languages spoken in the district are Lote, Mengen, Nakanai, and Tomoip.

== See also ==
- Districts of Papua New Guinea
- Pomio Kivung
