= Lae District =

- Location within Papua New Guinea
- Coordinates: 6.7246°S 146.9895°E
- Country: Papua New Guinea
- Province: Morobe Province
- Capital: Lae

Area
  - Total: 130.9 km^{2} (50.5 sq mi)

Population (2024 census)
  - Total: 203,056
  - Density: 1,551/km^{2} (4,018/sq mi)
- Time zone: UTC+10 (AEST)

Lae District is a district of the Morobe Province of Papua New Guinea. Its capital is Lae. The population of the district was 148,934 at the 2011 census.
