= Ambunti-Dreikikier District =

- Location within Papua New Guinea
- Coordinates: 4°21′S 142°08′E
- Country: Papua New Guinea
- Province: East Sepik Province
- Capital: Ambunti

Area
  - Total: 14,840 km^{2} (5,730 sq mi)

Population (2024 census)
  - Total: 109,593
  - Density: 7.385/km^{2} (19.13/sq mi)
- Time zone: UTC+10 (AEST)

Ambunti-Dreikikier District (sometimes spelled Ambunti-Drekikier District) is a district of East Sepik Province in Papua New Guinea. It is one of the six administrative districts that make up the province.

April Salome Forest Management Area is located in the district.

== See also ==
- Districts of Papua New Guinea
