= Aitape-Lumi District =

District in Papua New Guinea

- Location within Papua New Guinea
- Coordinates: 3°09′S 142°21′E
- Country: Papua New Guinea
- Province: Sandaun Province
- Capital: Aitape

Area
  - Total: 5,689 km^{2} (2,197 sq mi)

Population (2024 census)
  - Total: 103,360
  - Density: 18.17/km^{2} (47.06/sq mi)
- Time zone: UTC+10 (AEST)

Aitape-Lumi District is a district of Sandaun Province of Papua New Guinea. Its capital is Aitape. The provincial administration is called the Sandaun Provincial Administration. The provincial capital is Vanimo, about 200 km up the northwest coastline.

Aitape and Lumi used to be separate districts before the reformations which amalgamated these two used to be districts into one. Aitape is on the coast whilst Lumi is located inland.
