= Karimui-Nomane District =

- Location within Papua New Guinea
- Coordinates: 6.494°S 144.819°E
- Country: Papua New Guinea
- Province: Chimbu Province
- Capital: Karimui

Area
  - Total: 3,474 km^{2} (1,341 sq mi)

Population (2011 census)
  - Total: 52,159
  - Density: 15.01/km^{2} (38.89/sq mi)
- Time zone: UTC+10 (AEST)

Karimui-Nomane District is a district of the Simbu Province of Papua New Guinea. Its capital is Karimui. The population was 52,159 at the 2011 census.
