= Maprik District =

- Location within Papua New Guinea
- Coordinates: 3.6269°S 143.0514°E
- Country: Papua New Guinea
- Province: East Sepik Province
- Capital: Maprik

Area
  - Total: 843.1 km^{2} (325.5 sq mi)

Population (2024 census)
  - Total: 100,367
  - Density: 119.0/km^{2} (308.3/sq mi)
- Time zone: UTC+10 (AEST)

Maprik District is a district of East Sepik Province in Papua New Guinea. It is one of the six administrative districts that make up the province. It is about two and half hours drive from the provincial capital of Wewak. It's considered as the economic hub of the Sepik region as Maprik Town services not only the people of Maprk but other Districts such as, Yangoru Sausia, Wosera Gawi, Ambunti Drekikier and Aitape Lumi in West Sepik Province. The current Political Head of the district is Hon. Gabriel lenny Kapris, MP. There are 5 local level governments that made up the district.

1.Maprik Urban Local Level Government

Current Political Head: Lord Mayor Mr. Paul Dingu

2. Maprik Wora Rural Local Level Government

Current Political Head: President Mr. Ian Samuel

3.Yamil Tamaui Rural Local Level Government

Current Political Head: President Mr. Carl Sangi

4. Albiges Mamblep Rural Local Level Government

Current Political Head: President Mr. Stanley Konoly

5. Bumbita Muhian Rural Local Level Government

Current Political Head: President Mr. Bonny Demo

== See also ==
- Districts of Papua New Guinea
