= Middle Ramu District =

- Location within Papua New Guinea
- Coordinates: 5.272°S 144.537°E
- Country: Papua New Guinea
- Province: Madang Province
- Capital: Aiome

Area
  - Total: 7,781 km^{2} (3,004 sq mi)

Population (2024 census)
  - Total: 131,610
  - Density: 16.91/km^{2} (43.81/sq mi)
- Time zone: UTC+10 (AEST)

Middle Ramu District is a district in the south-west of Madang Province in Papua New Guinea. It is one of the six administrative districts that make up the province.

== See also ==
- Middle Ramu languages
