= Kokopo District =

- Location within Papua New Guinea
- Coordinates: 4.3417°S 152.2657°E
- Country: Papua New Guinea
- Province: East New Britain Province
- Capital: Kokopo

Area
  - Total: 408 km^{2} (158 sq mi)

Population (2011 census)
  - Total: 87,829
  - Density: 215/km^{2} (558/sq mi)
- Time zone: UTC+10 (AEST)

Kokopo District is a district of East New Britain Province in Papua New Guinea. It is one of the four administrative districts that make up the province.

== See also ==
- Districts of Papua New Guinea
