= Menyamya District =

- Location within Papua New Guinea
- Coordinates: 7.113°S 145.992°E
- Country: Papua New Guinea
- Province: Morobe Province
- Capital: Menyamya

Government
  - MP: Hon. Solen O. Loifa, MP

Area
  - Total: 3,729 km^{2} (1,440 sq mi)

Population (2024 census)
  - Total: 119,809
  - Density: 32.13/km^{2} (83.21/sq mi)
- Time zone: UTC+10 (AEST)

Menyamya District is a district of the Morobe Province of Papua New Guinea. Its capital is Menyamya. The population of the district was 87,209 at the 2011 census. The current Member of Parliament for Menyamya in the Eleventh National Parliament is the Honorable Solen Loifa, MP
