= Mendi-Munihu District =

- Location within Papua New Guinea
- Coordinates: 6°08′S 143°39′E
- Country: Papua New Guinea
- Province: Southern Highlands
- Capital: Mendi

Area
  - Total: 1,354 km^{2} (523 sq mi)

Population (2011 census)
  - Total: 144,629
  - Density: 106.8/km^{2} (276.7/sq mi)
- Time zone: UTC+10 (AEST)

Mendi-Munihu District is a district of the Southern Highlands Province of Papua New Guinea. Its capital is Mendi. The population was 144,629 at the 2011 census.

== Settlements ==
- Kamb
- Kip
- Mendi
- Munhiu
- Pingirip
- Shumbi
