= Nawae District =

Nawaeb District
- Location within Papua New Guinea
- Coordinates: 6.432°S 146.826°E
- Country: Papua New Guinea
- Province: Morobe Province
- Capital: Boana

Area
  - Total: 3,219 km^{2} (1,243 sq mi)

Population (2024 census)
  - Total: 57,372
  - Density: 17.82/km^{2} (46.16/sq mi)
- Time zone: UTC+10 (AEST)

Nawae District is a district of the Morobe Province of Papua New Guinea. Its capital is Boana. The population of the district was 44,556 at the 2011 census.
