= Tawae-Siassi District =

Tawae-Siassi District Tewae-Siasi District
- Location within Papua New Guinea
- Coordinates: 5.96102°S 147.19431°E
- Country: Papua New Guinea
- Province: Morobe Province
- Head Quarter: Sialum

Government
  - MP: Dr Kobby Bomareo

Area
  - Total: 2,535 km^{2} (979 sq mi)

Population (2024 census)
  - Total: 73,452
  - Density: 28.98/km^{2} (75.05/sq mi)
- Time zone: UTC+10 (AEST)

Tewae-Siassi District (also spelled Tewae-Siasi District) is a district of the Morobe Province of Papua New Guinea. Its Head Quarter is Sialum. The population of the district was 54,340 at the 2011 census.
