= Markham District =

- Location within Papua New Guinea
- Coordinates: 6.721°S 146.267°E
- Country: Papua New Guinea
- Province: Morobe Province
- Capital: Kaiapit

Government
  - MP: Koni Iguan

Area
  - Total: 4,311 km^{2} (1,664 sq mi)

Population (2024 census)
  - Total: 93,917
  - Density: 21.79/km^{2} (56.42/sq mi)
- Time zone: UTC+10 (AEST)

Markham District is a district of the Morobe Province of Papua New Guinea. Its capital is Kaiapit. The population of the district was 62,495 at the 2011 census.
