= Kundiawa-Gembogl District =

- Location within Papua New Guinea
- Coordinates: 6°01′S 144°58′E
- Country: Papua New Guinea
- Province: Chimbu Province
- Capital: Kundiawa

Area
  - Total: 475 km^{2} (183 sq mi)

Population (2011 census)
  - Total: 78,521
  - Density: 165/km^{2} (428/sq mi)
- Time zone: UTC+10 (AEST)

Kundiawa-Gembogl District is a district of the Simbu Province of Papua New Guinea. Its capital is Kundiawa. The population was 78,521 at the 2011 census.
