= Daulo District =

Place in Eastern Highlands, Papua New Guinea

- Location within Papua New Guinea
- Coordinates: 5.9943°S 145.3252°E
- Country: Papua New Guinea
- Province: Eastern Highlands
- Capital: Asaro

Area
  - Total: 625 km^{2} (241 sq mi)

Population (2011 census)
  - Total: 45,783
  - Density: 73.3/km^{2} (190/sq mi)
- Time zone: UTC+10 (AEST)

Daulo District is part of the Eastern Highlands Province in Papua New Guinea. It is along the Highlands highway (Okuk Highway) leading to the other Highlands provinces, namely Simbu Province, Western Highlands, Southern Highlands and Enga Province. Daulo District shares geographical border with Simbu Province and Madang Province. Part of Daulo District's Upper Asaro Constituency is a walking distance to Mt. Wilhelm, Papua New Guinea's highest mountain in Simbu Province. Daulo is the real home of the famous Asaro Mudmen . It has a total population of over 53,000 people. It has a small district office administered by the District Administrator who is a representative of the provincial government. The electoral member for Daulo, with the help of the governor for the province, is responsible for the set up and running of Daulo District similarly with the other districts in the Eastern Highlands Province. The district was partly the implementation of the reform initiative undertaken by the Morauta government in 1995.

District administration functions very much depend on government funds as there are not much of District profit-making undertakings. Daulo District continues to upgrade the road systems on an ad hoc basis due to lack of funding. There are three constituencies and they are: Upper Asaro local level government council, Lower Asaro local level government council and Watabung local level government council. Languages spoken differs from clan to clan but the major spoken language is known as "Dano". Most of the population speaks English and Tok Pisin.

The main cash crop in Daulo is coffee. Recently in 2002, inland fishing was introduced by Hon. Ron Ganarafo, member for Daulo 1997–2002, who return his seat again in 2012 general election. His aim to assist school children and generate more human resources. As of July 2013 he was the fourth M.P. to hand the district five-year plan to minister for Planning Hon. Charles Able. However, most people live a subsistence living. As people begin to learn about marketing in other parts of Papua New Guinea, many have gone into agriculture to supply local markets around the country, specifically Lae, Port Moresby, Madang and Rabaul.

The people are now divided into various types of economic activities, 50% still in coffee, 40% in agriculture, 7% inland fishing and the rest other activities. Even though people tend to produce bags of Kaukau (sweet potato), carrot, cabbage and other commodities, yet live a poverty life.

The land is fertile and most Daulo people are hard workers. In 20 years time, Daulo district aims to export coffee and fish to other parts of the world with the help of Coffee Industry Corporation (CIC) based in Goroka and National Fisheries Authority (NFA).

Daulo is venturing into tourism industry due to its landscapes, rich cultural performances such as Asaro Mudmen. Apart from Asaro Mudmen, Daulo has Nokondi Cultural performance, a sing-sing group that is dressed in their traditional attires amongst others.
