= Rai Coast District =

Rai Coast (Rai Kos) District South Coast
- Location within Papua New Guinea
- Coordinates: 5.501°S 145.850°E
- Country: Papua New Guinea
- Province: Madang Province
- Capital: Saidor

Area
  - Total: 5,695 km^{2} (2,199 sq mi)

Population (2024 census)
  - Total: 127,949
  - Density: 22.47/km^{2} (58.19/sq mi)
- Time zone: UTC+10 (AEST)

Rai Coast District is a district in the southeast of Madang Province in Papua New Guinea. It is one of the six districts that of the Madang Province. The District has four local level government (LLG) areas namely; Astrolabe Bay, Nahu Rawa, (Nankina, Yupna & Domung (NAYUDO) and Saidor (formerly Rai Kos). The District has 84 ward areas. The largest local government area is Saidor which has 42 wards.

The District's headquarter or administrative center is located at Saidor in the Saidor LLG area. Historically, Saidor was the base for the allied forces during World War II, while the Astrolabe Bay LLG area was known by the Russian anthropologist and explorer Miklouho-Maclay who landed in the area in September 1871 on his boat - Vitiaz. Today a memorial stands at Garagasi in Bongu village.

Geographically, Rai Coast District is the most difficult districts in Madang Province with mountains (Mt. Abirara & Mt. Aniabo) rising to more than 2,000 meters asl. Road accessibility is very limited to a track. Only during dry season, four wheel drive vehicles can be used. From Madang to the border, there are many fast running creeks and rivers and makes crossing difficult during wet season.

Many Rai Coast languages are spoken in this district.

== See also ==
- Rai Coast languages
- Rai Coast Rural LLG
