= Henganofi District =

- Location within Papua New Guinea
- Coordinates: 6.2603°S 145.5960°E
- Country: Papua New Guinea
- Province: Eastern Highlands
- Capital: Henganofi

Area
  - Total: 941 km^{2} (363 sq mi)

Population (2011 census)
  - Total: 62,904
  - Density: 66.8/km^{2} (173/sq mi)
- Time zone: UTC+10 (AEST)

Henganofi District is a district of the Eastern Highlands Province in Papua New Guinea. It has four local levels of government(LLGs) headed by a president who is normally elected by the LLG's wards or villages council representatives. The four LLGs are Dunantina, Fayantina, Kafentina and Kamanontina. Its capital is Henganofi.
