= Okapa District =

- Location within Papua New Guinea
- Coordinates: 6°31′S 145°37′E
- Country: Papua New Guinea
- Province: Eastern Highlands
- Capital: Okapa

Area
  - Total: 2,110 km^{2} (810 sq mi)

Population (2011 census)
  - Total: 73,393
  - Density: 34.8/km^{2} (90.1/sq mi)
- Time zone: UTC+10 (AEST)

Okapa District is a district of the Eastern Highlands Province in Papua New Guinea. Its capital is Okapa.
