= Yalu, Papua New Guinea =

Yalu
- Village
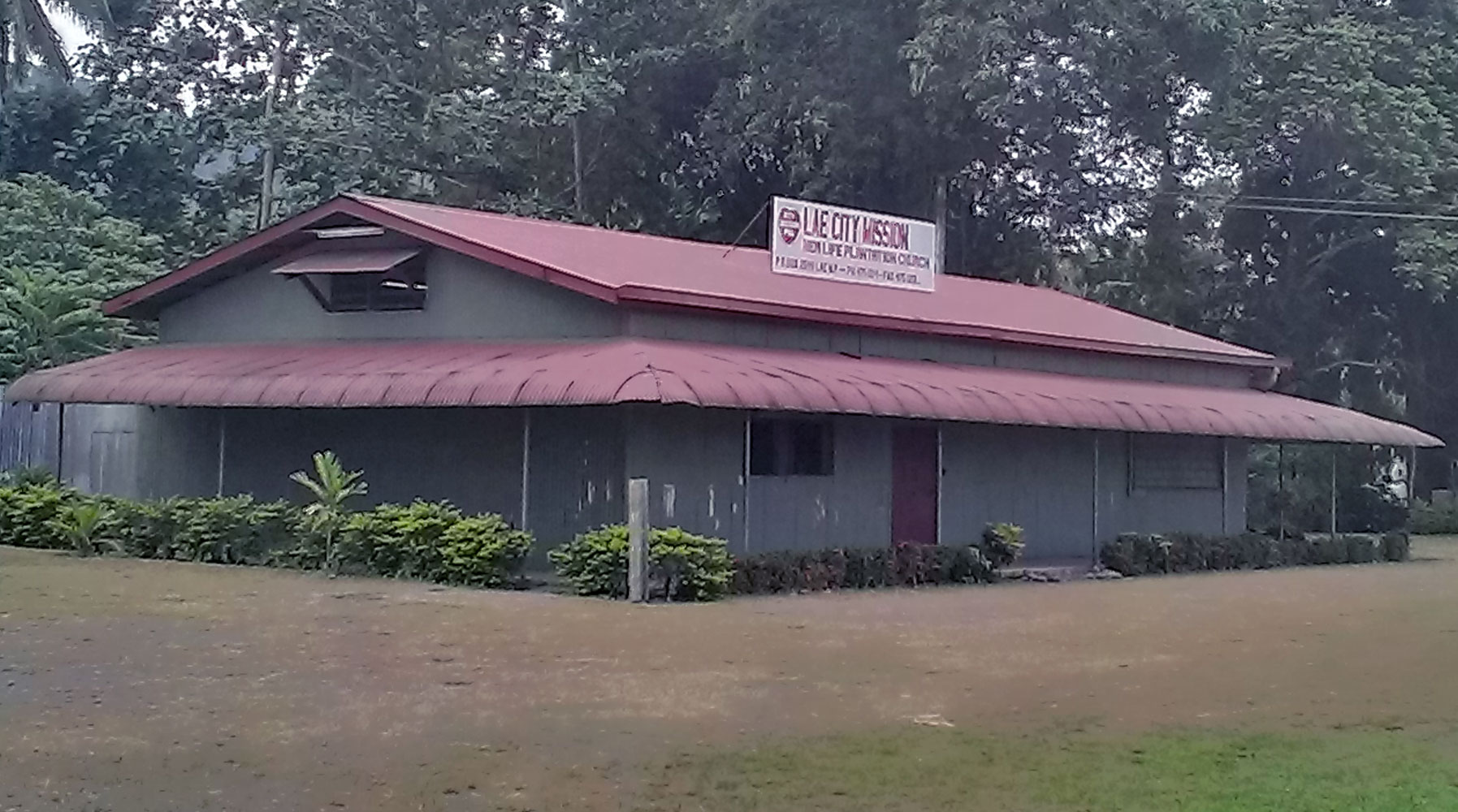
- Yalu - Lae City Mission New Life Plantation church

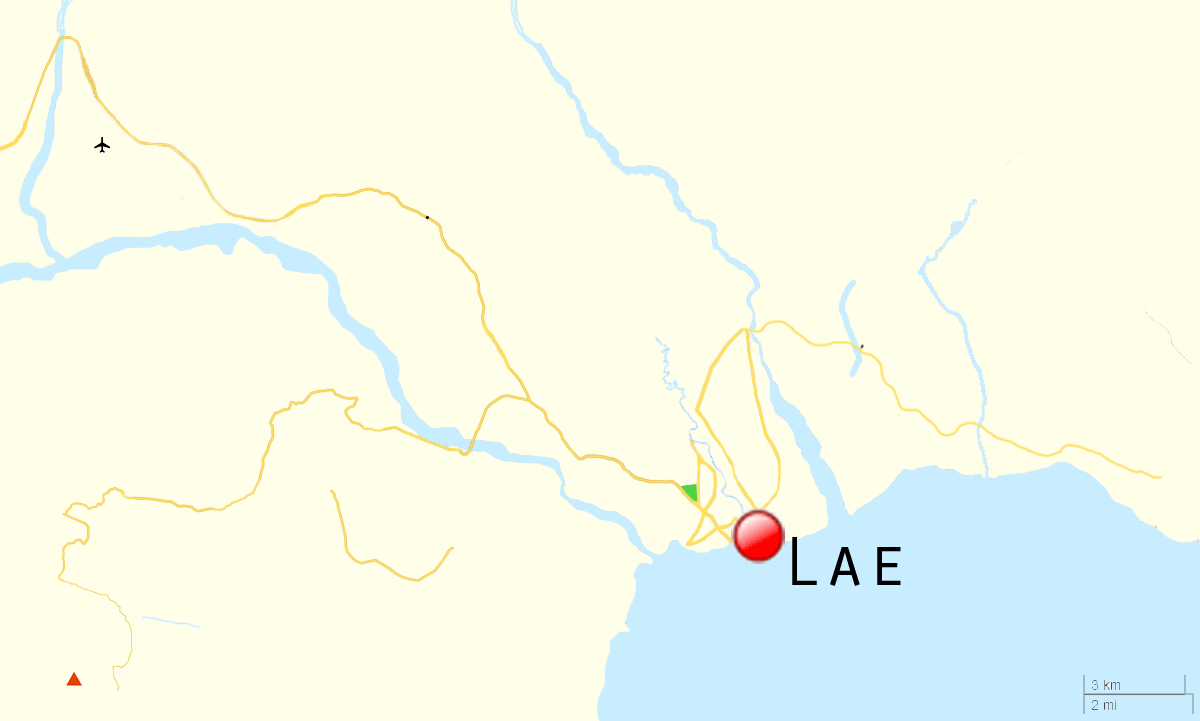
- Location in the Lae area
- Coordinates: 6°35′41″S 146°52′37″E
- Country: Papua New Guinea
- Province: Morobe Province
- District: Huon District
- LLG: Wampar LLG
- Time zone: UTC+10 (AEST)

Yalu is a large village in Wampar Rural LLG, located in the Markham Valley of Morobe Province, Papua New Guinea. It lies along the Highlands Highway 21.5 kilometres (13.4 mi) north-west of Lae, 7 kilometres (4.3 mi) southeast of Nadzab. The landscape is typically lowland rainforest.

== History ==
In 1930, a delegation including the District Officer and Patrol Officer (Kiap based around Nadzab, inspected Markham Valley villages. The report to the Council of the League of Nations states:

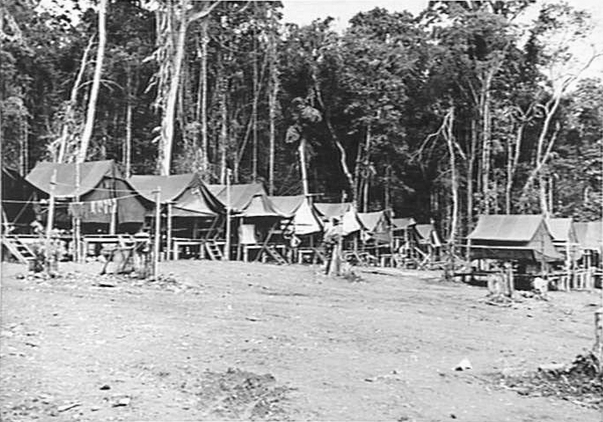
The Camp area No. 3 Platoon 2/1 Forestry Co. Royal Australian Engineers at Yalu

"The Yalu natives had recently abandoned their old village, and have established themselves nearby in a more accessible position. I inspected the village and saw 120 natives, none had complaints"

During World War 2, Number 3 Platoon, 2/1 Forestry Company, Royal Australian Engineers established a forestry camp at Yalu to provide timber and the New Guinea RAAF Training School was located in and around Yalu.

In 2008, three weeks of rain recorded at 107mm for a 24-hour period has led to extensive flooding in Papua New Guinea's Morobe province with the Yalu bridge connecting the province and the highlands on the verge of collapsing. Many farms and homes in Yalu have been washed away.

== Demographics ==
Yalu is in the Wampar Local Level Government, Huon District, and is made up of eight small community settlements ranging in population from 19 to 957 people. In total, Yalu and its surrounds consist of approximately 2,609 people and 460 households. Three percent (3%) of villages work in Lae.

The villagers reportedly refer to themselves as "Aribwaung", the name also given to the local dialect as well as Yalu. Yalu village comprises members of the two most prominent clans—the Timkim clan and the Konzorong clan. The settlements, drawing from NSO 2,000 National Population Census report include Yalu (957 people, 160 households); Ambuasutz (218 people, 33 households); Langalanga (311 people, 62 households), Anund (19 people, 3 households), Yalu Bridge (184 people, 29 households); Parapi (326 people, 54 households); Yalu Plantation (191 people, 42 households) and Junglik Plantation (403 people, 76 households).

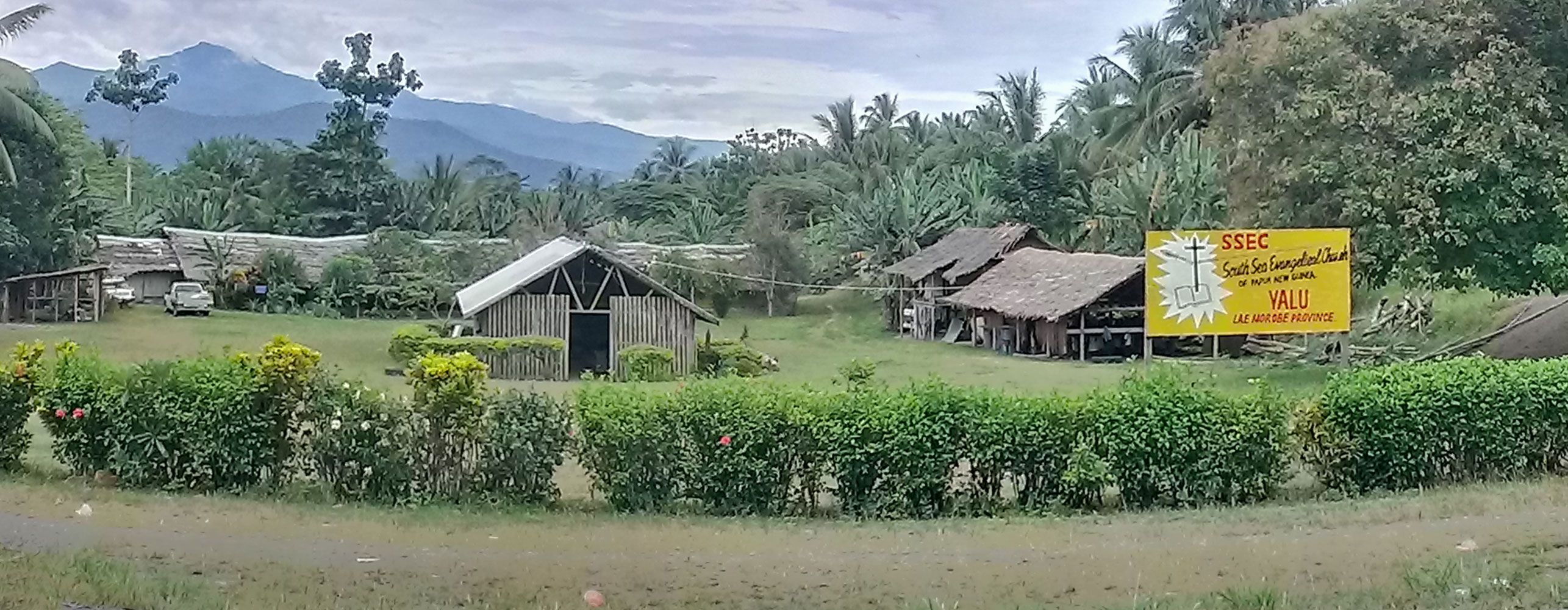
Yalu -South Seas Evangelical Church

In 2009 community leaders met to discuss the issue of customary land, specifically 359 acres (145 ha) of their customary land. During the meeting, community Elder, Buno Storm, stated;

Long, long time ago in the time of our ancestors, one tribe-line lived in the mountains on top of the Yalu River. They called themselves the Ngalunuf. One day they went to see another family. The village was called Ngalugosol. They had a sing-sing; a sing-sing without drums; all sing-sing with chuwen

Yalu land is occupied by both the local Aliwang people and settlers from other parts of Morobe such as the Waingg and Kabwum people. Yalu has a large land area beginning at Nine Mile to Markham Bridge, over the mountains to West Taraka, Bumayong and Igam Army Barracks and ending at Muya Primary School along the Highlands highway. Because of this large unused land area, most of it is occupied by settlers especially from Nine Mile all the way to Yalu along both sides of the highway. Land-owners have until the recent past 'sold' their land to new settlers.

The rapid growth in rural-to-urban migration with little income will either squat or enter into informal arrangements with customary landowners. The Ahis, who are the customary land owners, consist of six villages, namely Butibum, Wagang, Yanga, Kamkumung, Yalu, and Hengali and have entered into negotiations with government authorities to repossess land illegally settled, and release land to the formal sector to accommodate the expansion of Lae city.

== Economy ==
In 2009 the Institute for Global Environmental Strategies conducted research into the use of forest certification as an instrument to assist communities manage forests for multiple purposes. Nine communities that are certified under The Forest Management and Production Certification Service across the country were examined and Yalu was described as the most affluent and the only village with electricity. In Yalu, the "Mamas Group" receives K200 per day for moving timber, thich they do 4-5 times per year although they can earn more by selling garden produce, cocoa and copra.

Another 2009 survey indicated that the majority of the people in Yalu are subsistence gardeners with some rearing chicken and pigs and some grow cocoa and betel nut as cash crops. Surplus food is sold at the main market in Lae. Some people raise chickens and are contracted by the Niugini Table Birds factory while many earn their income through the sale of garden food. In the survey conducted, when asked about the main way of making a living, 74 per cent said that they work within the household (compared to 57 per cent overall), 12 per cent sell goods at market or on the street (compared to 23 per cent overall); 9 per cent receive a wage from the state (compared to 7 per cent overall) and 3 per cent receive a wage from private business (on par with the overall average). Seventy per cent said the main place they got their food was from work done on their own lands or by fishing (compared to 78 per cent overall), 21 per cent selected 'local shops' and 3 per cent selected 'food markets'.

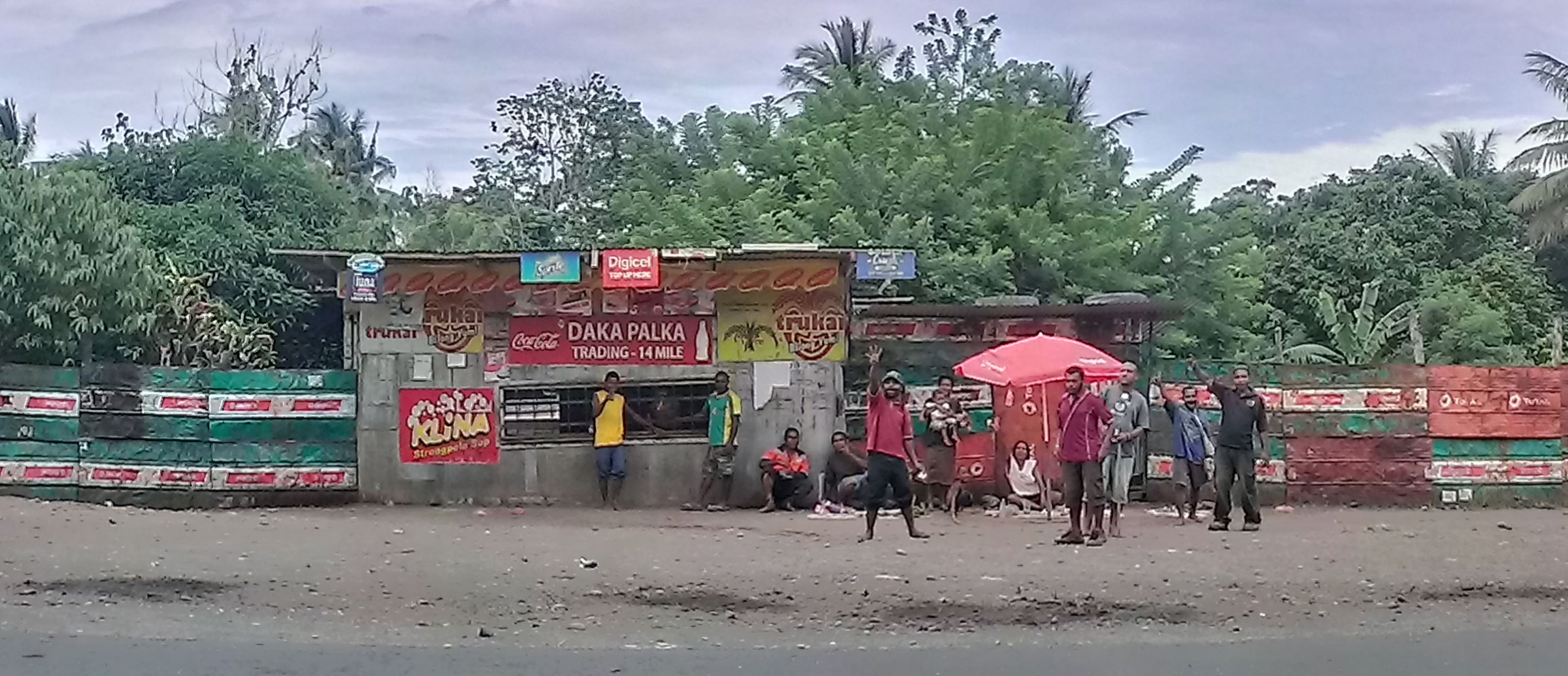
Yalu road side store (14 Mile)

The 2007 Bris Kanda Economic Development Program for Yalu, recommended the Morobe Province provide financial and technical advice to the Yalu Plantation (which has been returned to local landowners) to rehabilitate the 145 hectares (360 acres) of cocoa and coconuts plantation, as well as the rehabilitation of existing system of fish farms.

=== Forestry ===
Research published in 1925 indicated that the effects of forestry in the area was clearly visible as the grasslands in Markham Valley are claimed to be the product of forest clearance and/or burning by humans. In In 1925 it was hypothesised that;

"At one time forest of this type stretched all the way along the coast between the mountains inland and the sea, and all along the vast valleys of the Markham and Ramu Rivers. Today, artificially formed grasslands have taken the place of the forest on the best of the land, and, in the less fertile areas, a secondary weed growth has established itself"

In 1952 the Yalu saw-mill, near Lae, is reported to have converted 3.031,766 super feet of logs for recovery of 1,265,172 super feet of sawn timber. Exports of sewn timber amounted to nearly 1,400,000 super feet during 1953-54 and the log export totalled 775,149 super feet. The Forestry Ordinance 1936–1951, provides for the issue of permits and licences to cut timber on "sound forestry principals"

In the 1980s forests around Yalu were harvested for the last time for the profitable timber species kwila, rosewood, walnut, blackbean and red cedar. Since then, the 1,500 villagers have continued using what remained of the forest for subsistence living including hunting, agriculture, medicines and for local building materials.

The Western Co-operative Society used the sawmill as a training center for participants.

Before 1999, two test sites were established to monitor rehabilitative efforts at locations of degraded forests. The high altitude site near Bulolo was compared to the low altitude Yalu site The results indicated that Pterocarpus indicus showed most potential. Australian researchers, the PNG Forest Research Institute and the Village Development Trust are researching sustainable harvested, Fairtrade timber production at three communities; Sogi in Madang Province (20,000 ha), Yalu (5,000 ha) and Gabensis (2,000 ha) in the Morobe province.

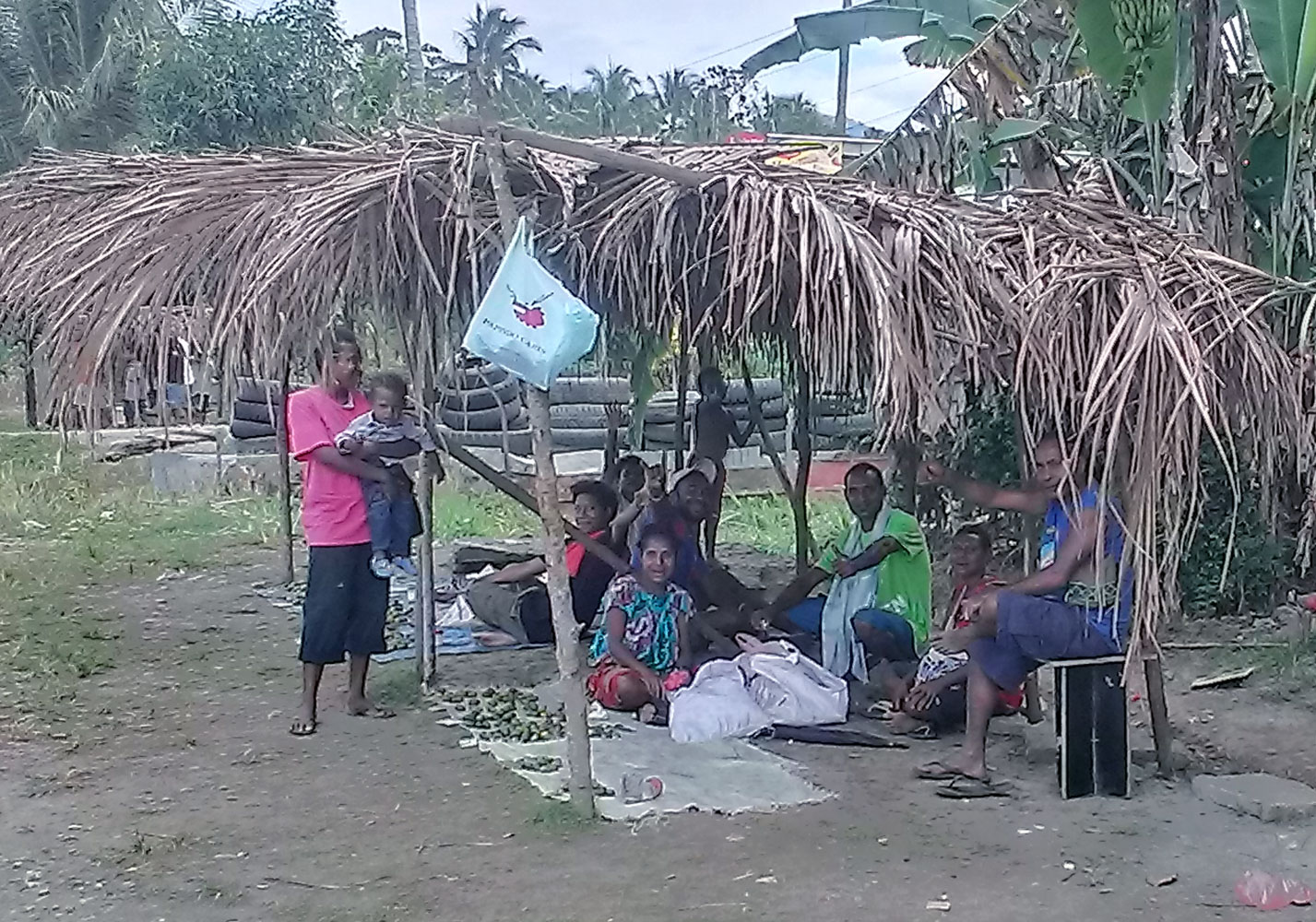
Buai roadside stall

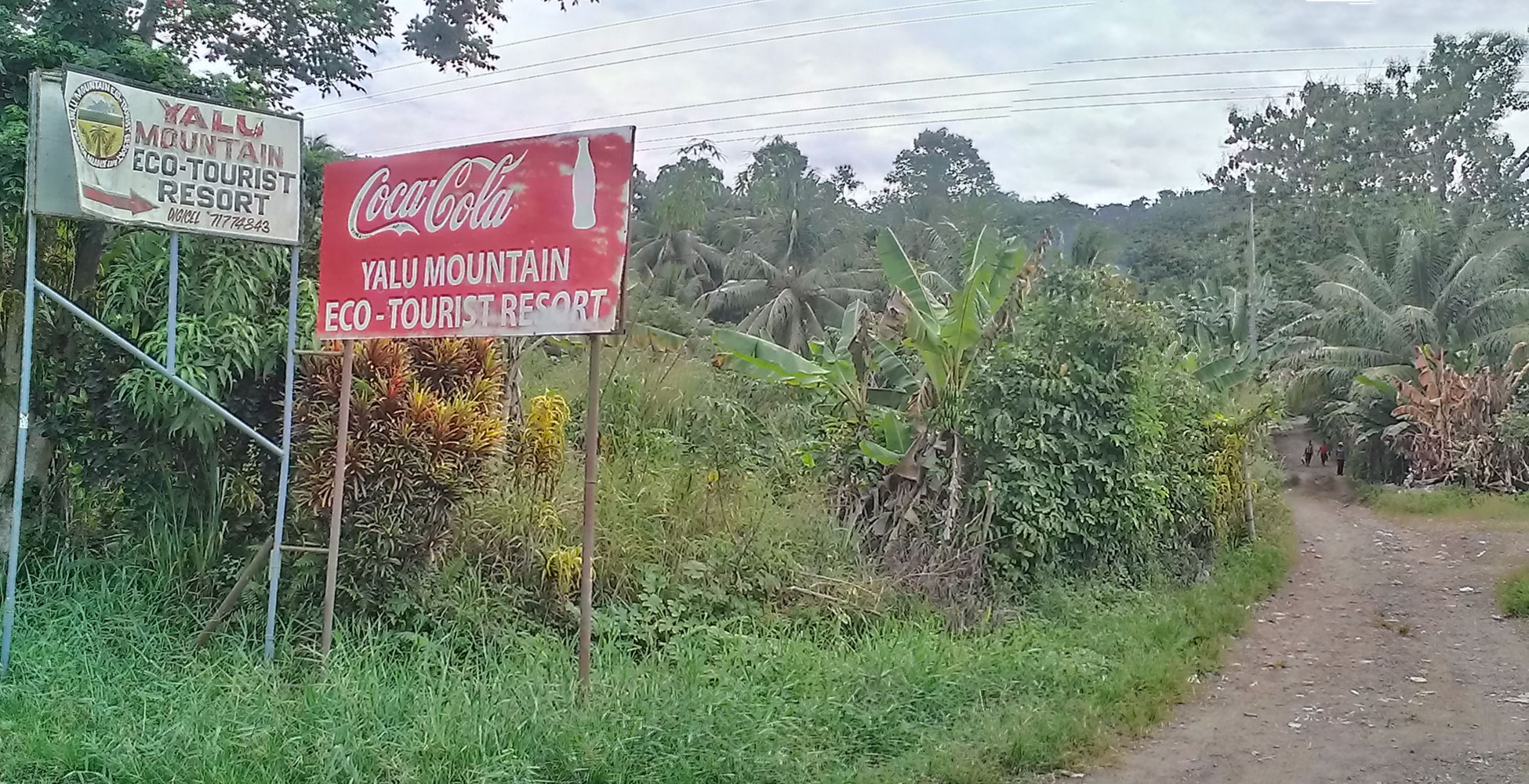
Yalu Eco Tourist resort entrance

In 2007 the same site at Yalu was the location of a European Commission sponsored dialogue into sustainable forestry. The working party claims;

"the site was heavily logged in 1994 under a Timber Authority (TA) permit which allowed the extraction of 5000 m3 of timber. Visual observation suggests that every saleable tree was removed, leaving only small trees and trees with bad form. The forest has been largely left to regrow undisturbed. It is presently dominated by pioneer species, but the forest ecology is showing signs of recovery. There was evidence of local people using the area for hunting, always a good sign. The PSP is well marked. It was last measured in 2004 and provides a good insight into this method of research".

=== Cocoa ===
JUNGRIK Plantation Ltd in Yalu was established in 1971 and is operated by about 150 - 200 family members from the Nabak Villages of Sambuen, Momsalop and Kasanombe in the Nawaeb District of the Morobe Province. The company has been selling cocoa products to Argmark company

=== Cassava Biofuel ===
In 2003 it was reported in The National that the South Korean Bohae Group of Companies signed an MOU with the government to enable the company to cultivate Cassava in Yalu for ethanol production and export. In February 2013, Changhae Ethanol (formerly Bohae) filed a patent application for its 'techniques of manufacturing bio-fuel and biochemical materials.

== Education ==
Local knowledge and special skills are passed down from fathers to sons and from mothers to daughters. Special skills like black magic and sorcery are also passed down through specific and selected individuals who are within the family group. Some of the persons interviewed indicated that respect for elders and traditional knowledge of doing certain things and activities seems to be waning and many of the elderly people said that the young people in the community are not interested to learn or know about traditional things.

The 2009 survey indicated that the type of training or learning that would be considered particularly helpful includes: agriculture 73 per cent (compared to 53 per cent overall); technology 16 per cent (compared to 18 per cent overall); family-life 16 per cent (compared to 37 per cent overall), management 22 per cent (compared to 27 per cent overall); literacy 16 per cent (compared to 19 per cent overall); income-generation 18 per cent (compared to 35 per cent overall) and traditional ways of doing things 16 per cent (compared to 33 per cent overall). Tertiary education as highest level of education completed (at 9 per cent) was on par with the overall figure across the country, whilst primary school was 46 per cent, just slightly higher than the overall figure of 42 per cent. Secondary-level education was much lower at 28 per cent, compared to the overall at 33 per cent, while trade training was higher at 17 per cent than the overall average of 13 per cent. There were no tertiary level qualified compared to the 3 per cent overall.

== Healthy Village ==
In 1998 Yalu Village was declared a Healthy Village under the National Health Plan 1996–2000.
