= Bumayong =

- Suburb
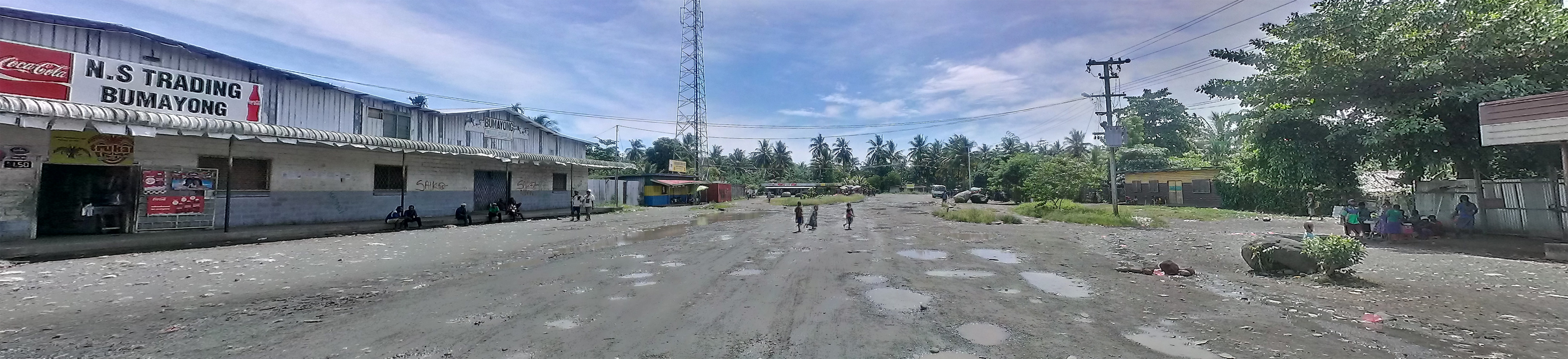
- Panoramic photo of Bumayong CBD on Independence Drive. Lae, Morobe Province

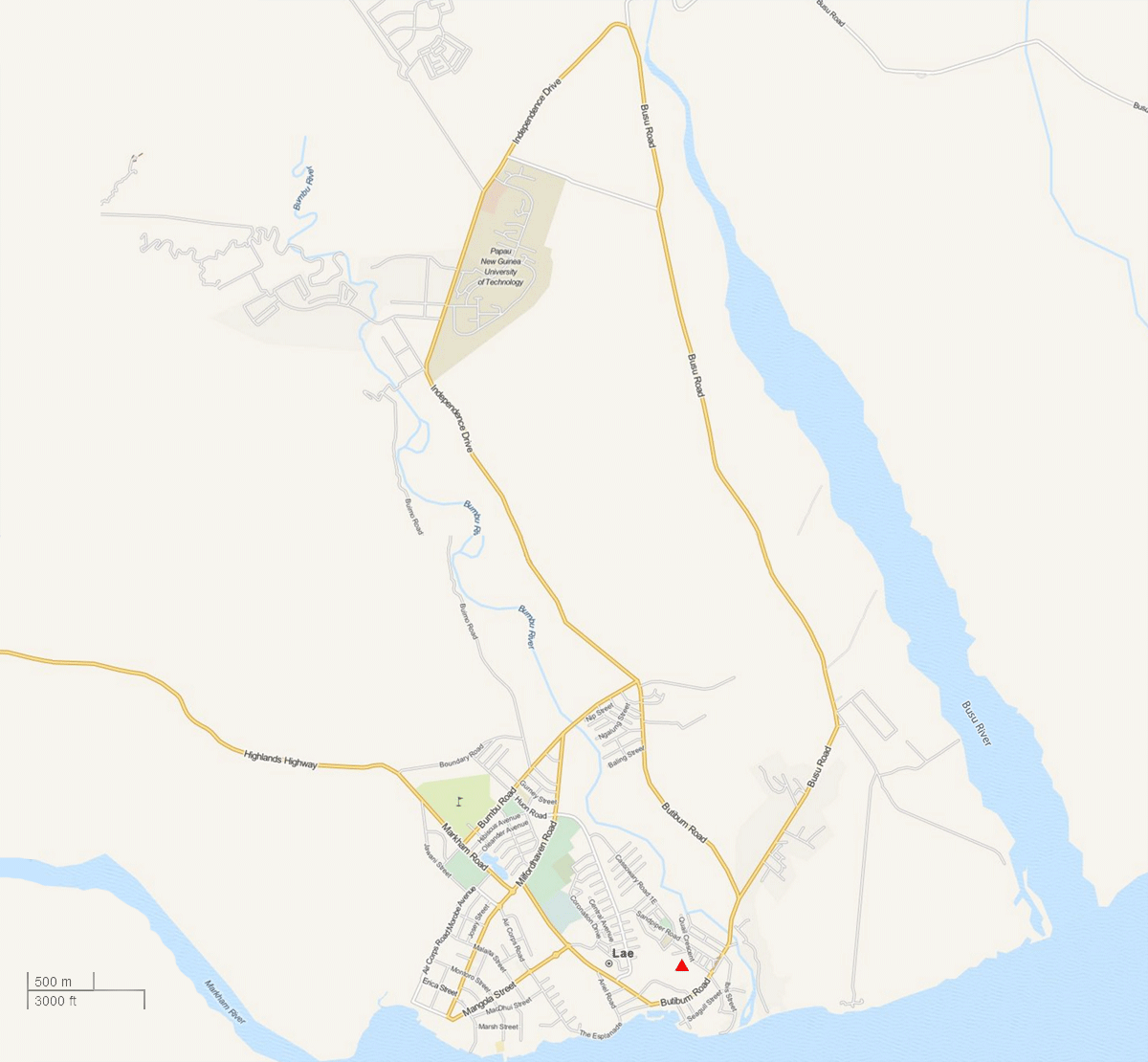
- Location in Lae
- Coordinates: 6°38′50″S 146°59′11″E
- Country: Papua New Guinea
- Province: Morobe Province
- District: Lae District
- Time zone: UTC+10 (AEST)

Bumayong is an outer suburb of Lae in the Morobe Province, Papua New Guinea.

== Location ==
Bumayong is located 12 km North of Lae on Independence Drive up the road from the University of Technology on the Independence Drive loop. A Bailey bridge crosses the Busu River on the road to the villages of Bualu and Situm.

== Lutheran Mission Training ==
There are three main Lutheran training locations in Lae; Martin Luther Seminary in Malahang, Balob Teachers College in Butibum and the Bumayong Lutheran High school.

== Law and Order ==
In November 2011, large scale riots broke out in Lae following a petition and march on the Morobe Provincial Admin (Tutumang). The petition addressed four points, namely;

1. Lae city Authority Manager to be sacked for giving contracts to outsiders and not Morobeans.
2. Highlands PMV bus stop at Eriku to move to 9 mile.
3. No more street selling in the city as it only breeds criminal activities.
4. Check on Lands Dept office and sack its staff for land corruption deals to Asians, outsiders etc.

A Vox populi reported in The National outlines the opinions of residents;

"I call on Luther Wenge to take a bus ride from town to Eriku and see first-hand how the city is like"
""It is frustrating and scary for me as a woman to catch a PMV from Eriku to work"

The violent riots have crippled Papua New Guinea's main industrial centre with widespread destruction of property and government is warning it may declare a state of emergency.

More than 1000 people were left homeless as many homes in Bumayong were destroyed in two days of riots which left nine people dead.

In 2013 the youths of Bumayong surrendered a large number of weapons including homemade pistols, wire catapults, a grenade and several kilos of Marijuana.

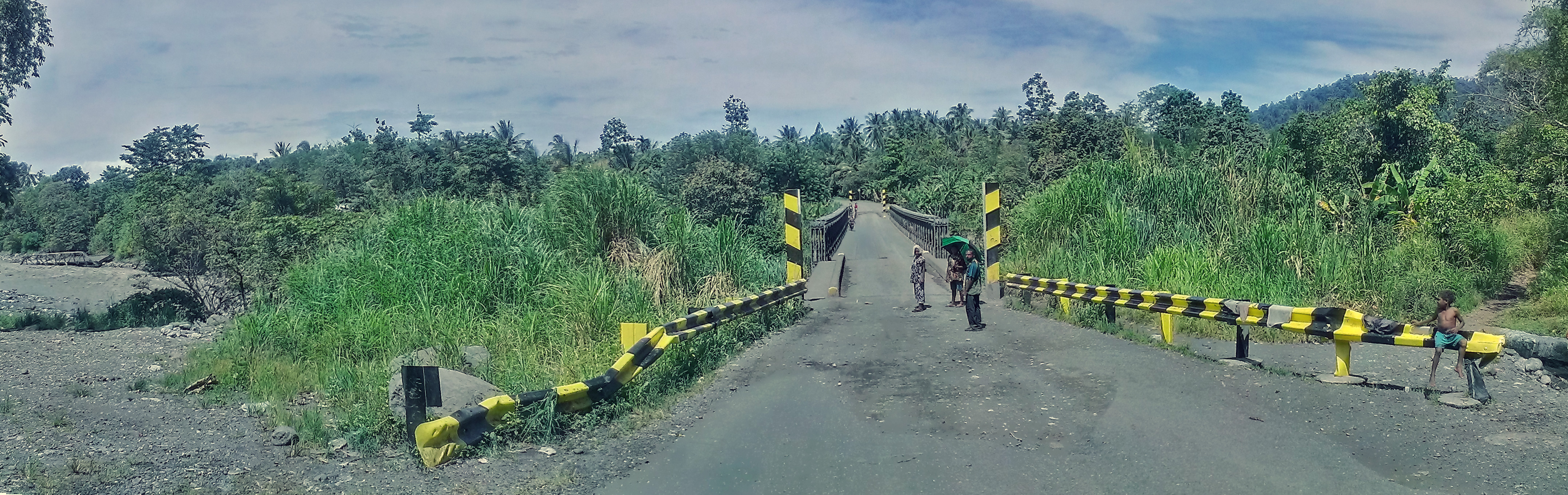
Panoramic photo of Bumayong Bailey bridge over the Busu River near Lae, Morobe Province. Road towards Situm School which was the staging point of the 7th Division (Australia)

== Traditional Land ==
The land around Bumayong belongs to the village of Yalu 6°35′42″S 146°52′16″E which is located 17 km on the Highlands Hwy. between Lae and the Lae Nadzab Airport. Yalu land begins at Nine Mile settlement to Markham Bridge, over the mountains to West Taraka, Bumayong and Igam Army Barracks to Muya Primary School. Most of the land is occupied by settlers.

== Bumayong Lutheran High School ==
In 1955 a Conch (instrument) band was formed at the Bumayong High School near the Lutheran headquarters. Missionaries in PNG expected all their congregations to learn to sing European hymns and German Lutherans improved singing through innovative use of traditional instrument, the conch-shell trumpet. The conch-shell band preserve German Lutheran hymnody.

== Notable people ==
Gisuwat Siniwim was the former principal of Bumayong Lutheran High School and became a Member of Parliament for the People's National Congress and Education Vice-Minister.
