= Musom language =

Endangered Oceanic language of Papua New Guinea

Musom
- Misatik
- Region: Markham Valley, New Guinea
- Native speakers: (200 cited 2000)
- Language family: Austronesian: Malayo-Polynesian; Oceanic; Western Oceanic; Huon Gulf; Markham; Lower Markham; Busu; Musom

Language codes
- ISO 639-3: msu
- Glottolog: muso1238
- ELP: Musom
- Musom is classified as Definitely Endangered by the UNESCO Atlas of the World's Languages in Danger.
- Coordinates: 6.683574°S 147.11452°E

Musom is an Austronesian language spoken in the single village of Musom (6.683574°S 147.11452°E) in Labuta Rural LLG, Morobe Province, Papua New Guinea. The other name for Musom is Misatik, given by the older generations because this was the name of the village that the ancestors settled on. Musom is currently an endangered language because native Musom speakers are continuing to marry other language speakers. Musom is also endangered because of its change in grammar and vocabulary due to its bi- and multilingualism. In the Musom village, other languages that Musom speakers may speak are Aribwuang and Duwet. In the Gwabadik village, because of intermarriages other languages that Musom speakers may speak are Nabak and Mesem.

== Phonology ==
Musom Consonants
	Bilabial	Alveolar	Affricated Alveolar	Velar	Glottal	Labio-velar
Stop: Voiceless	p	t	ts	k	'	kw
Voiced	b	d	dz	g		gw
Prenasalised			(nts)			
Voiceless						
Voiced	mb	nd	ndz	ngg		
Nasal	m	n		ng		
Fricatives		s			h	
Liquid		r				
Semi-vowel	w					

In Musom, voiceless, voiced and prenasalised voice are the only series of stops when it comes to consonants. For Musom consonants, if there is a prenasalised voice stop, the vowel is then seen after it and is can be as nasal only. Allophones are contained in the prenasalised voiced affricated alveolar stop /ndz/ which occurs initially, medially, and then [nts] occurs finally.

For the consonants, /w, kw, gw/ they do not occur initially, medially and finally, but all other consonants do. Other consonants that do not occur finally are /d, g, ndz/. When the word ends in with a consonant and the next word also begins with a consonant, a prothetic a is put in between the words. For the consonant /r/, it contains two allophones [r] and [l], but only in free variation.

Musom Vowels
	Front	Central	Back
High	i		u
Mid	e		o
Low		a	
Diphthongs: ai, ou, au, oi, oai			

When Musom is compared to Yabim, there are claims that infer that Musom may have a 7-vowel system.

=== Syllable Structure ===
Musom language has a syllable structure of (C) V (C) (V) (C).

=== Morphophonemics ===
In Musom language, if a speaker were to talk fast, /u/ could be heard as [i]. Some examples that could be heard are:

- num > [nim] drink
- wutsin . [witsin] inside

If a subject pronoun prefix that contains a vowel, comes before the root that is within a vowel (verb root), the verb root changes according to what came before it. Some examples are:

- mbidi stand up
  a-mbidi 1st person subject > u-mbudi 2nd person subject

i-mbidi 3rd person subject

- mbitsi cook on fire

a-mbitsi 1st person subject > u-mbutsi 2nd person subject

i-imbitsi 3rd person subject

Words that contain multiple syllables, those syllables could be dropped or centralized. A vowel turns into schwa [ə] in the unstressed syllable. Here is an example:

- 'apun completive particle > ['apm] ~ ['apəm]

== Pronouns ==
Focal pronouns are able to be used as subjects and objects of verbs. Prepositions only occur with objects of verbs. Focal pronouns are also found in a possessive phrase. For 1st singular, short form only occurs when wir is switched for u or ur.

Focal Pronouns
	SG	DU	PL
1 excl.	wir/u/ur	sikin	tse
1 incl.	-	suk	tsir
2	ingg	som sikin	tsom
3	in	isikin	is

Interrogative pronouns can be seen with who and what. In Musom, who and what can be used with two different pronouns. Those two different pronouns are:

- asa "who"
- sira "what"

Some examples of these two pronouns are:

- in asa? Who is he?
  Rak anu sira? What is that there?

Asa ngaing gi-its ingg? Who hit you? (lit. Which man hit you?)

Both reflexive and emphatic pronouns both mean Pronoun + self. This table shows the reflexive and emphatic pronouns:

Reflexive/Emphatic Pronouns
	SG	DU	PL
1EXC	(o)rong	ro(ng)geng	ro(ng)geng
1INC	-	rons	rons
2	(i)rom	romem	romem
3	ron	rons	rons

== Possession ==
The first type of possession in Musom has inalienable nouns. Some examples of these inalienable nouns are kin terms, body parts, name, namesake, friend or trade partner.

Possession of Set 1 Inalienable Kinship Terms and Body Parts
	SG	DU	PL
1EXC	wir/ur a + N-ng(g)	sikin a + N-ng (g)	tse + N-ng(g)
1INC		suk a + N-ng(g)	tsir a + N-ng(g)
2	ingg a + N-m	som sikin a + N-m	tsom a + N-m
3	in a + N-n	isikin a + N-n	is a + N-m

The second type of possession in Musom is Alienable possession. The second type of possession holds all the nouns that are not in the first type. The possessive phrase can contain noun or pronoun possession, and prothetic a. Then there is a noun that is not attributed to the possessive markers which is the noun possessed. Here are some examples:

- wir a om my house

ingg a mimin your betelnut

in a tahung his smoke

is a kom/kom a is en their dog

== Sentence Structure ==
=== Coordination ===
In the Musom language, sentences can be formed by using conjunctions such as da 'and, but' and ma 'or'. One example using da is:

- Tse g-a-k g-a-bitsi ung da g-a-hur

weEXC P-SPP1-go P-SPP1-cook breadfruit and P-SPP1-fish

We cooked breadfruit and fished (for crayfish) in the river.

One example using ma is:

- Ingg ng-u-ak Madang ma ingg ng-u-ak

youSG IRR-SPP2-go Madang or youSG IRR-SPP2-go

You can go to Madang or you can go to Ramu.

=== Conditional ===
The Musom language when using conditional sentences can be found in the form of:

da + Subject 1 + ng-SPP-V da + Subject 2 bo-ng-SPP-V

An example using a conditional sentence is:

- Da amik ng-i-ruk wir bo-ng-a-bum omb.

and rain IRR-SPP3-fall I FUT-IRR-SPP1-stay village

If it rains I will stay in the village
