= Wampar Rural LLG =

Local-level government in Papua New Guinea

- Location within Papua New Guinea
- Coordinates: 6.573281°S 146.762709°E
- Country: Papua New Guinea
- Province: Morobe Province
- Time zone: UTC+10 (AEST)

Wampar Rural LLG is a local-level government (LLG) located in the Markham Valley of Morobe Province, Papua New Guinea. The Wampar language is spoken in the LLG, along with Labu, Yalu (Aribwaung), Watut, and other Markham languages.

== Wards ==
- 01. Mare (Wampar language speakers)
- 02. Wampit (Wampar language speakers)
- 03. Gabensis (Wampar language speakers)
- 04. Omisi
- 05. Markham Bridge
- 06. Labutale (Labu language speakers)
- 07. Labumiti (Labu language speakers)
- 08. Labubutu (Labu language speakers)
- 09. 5 Mile
- 10. St Joseph
- 11. Awillunga
- 12. Bubia
- 13. Busanim
- 14. Yalu (Aribwaung language speakers)
- 15. Munum (Wampar language speakers)
- 16. Nasuapum (Wampar language speakers)
- 17. Gapsongkeg (Wampar language speakers) - including historic World War II site of Nadzab
- 18. Naromangki
- 19. Chivasing (Wampar language speakers)
- 20. Tararan (Wampar language speakers)
- 21. Noa
- 22. Bogeba
- 23. Irumu
- 24. Uruf (North Watut language speakers)
- 25. Tsilitsili (Middle Watut language speakers)
- 26. Maralina (Middle Watut language speakers)
- 27. Maralangko (South Watut language speakers)
