= LBU =

LBU is a three-letter acronym that may refer to:

Universities

- Leeds Beckett University in Leeds, England
- Loughborough University in Loughborough, England
- Louisiana Baptist University, a Bible college in Shreveport, Louisiana, USA
- Lucian Blaga University of Sibiu in Sibiu, Romania
- Lumbini Buddhist University in Lumbini, Nepal
- Pennsylvania State University in Pennsylvania, USA, whose football program is sometimes referred to as Linebacker University

Other

- Labuan Airport, Labuan, Malaysia airport code
- Code of DFS CVOR/DME aircraft navigation station Luburg near Ludwigsburg, Germany, for Stuttgart Airport
- Labu language, ISO 639-3 language code
- Leaflet bomb unit, a type of cluster munition for dropping propaganda from aircraft
- lbu, Load Byte (U), an RISC-V instruction
