= Tent City, Papua New Guinea =

TentSiti (Tent City)
- Suburb
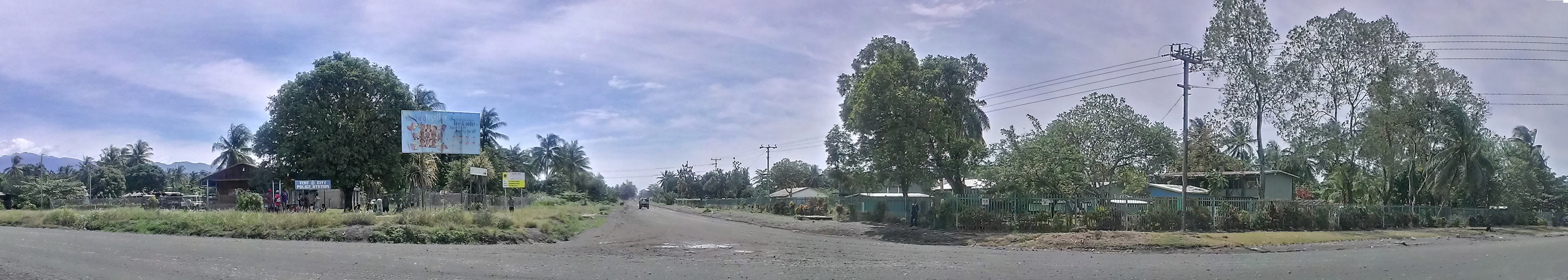
- Panoramic photo of Tent City (Tent siti) facing towards Telikom Training College. Police post on left, School on right

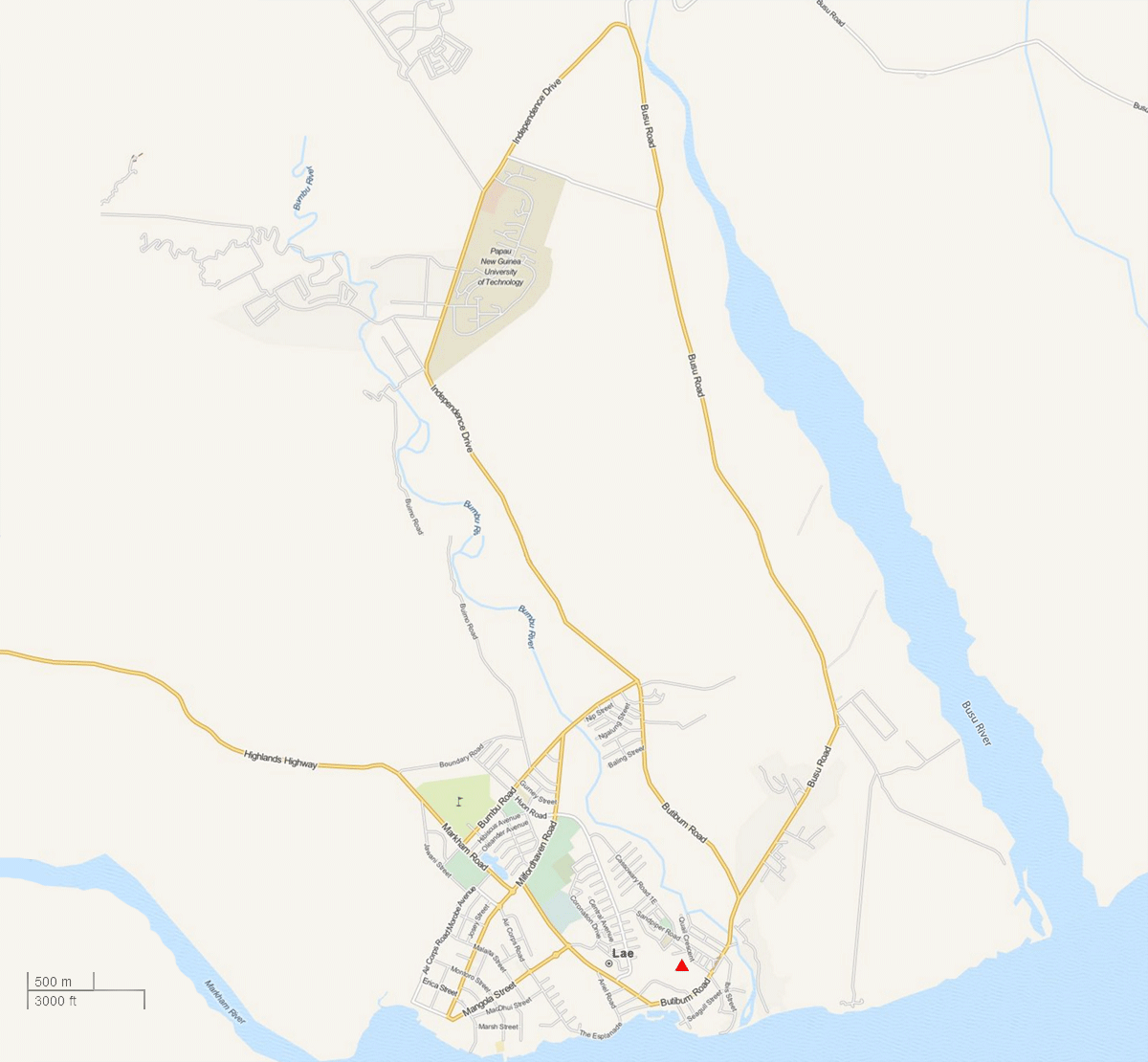
- Location in Lae
- Coordinates: 6°39′20″S 146°59′11″E
- Country: Papua New Guinea
- Province: Morobe Province
- District: Lae District
- Time zone: UTC+10 (AEST)

Tent City (Tent siti) is a suburb of Lae in the Morobe Province, Papua New Guinea. The main campus for the Papua New Guinea University of Technology is located 1 kilometre to the South of Tent City.

== Location ==
Tent City is located 9 km North of Lae on Independence Drive up the road from the University of Technology and to the North East of East Taraka.

== History of Tent City ==
Between December 1983 and July 1992, Lae experienced two major flood and mudslide disasters. In both cases, hundreds of people lost their homes. The 1983 floods remain the worst since the establishment of the town in the late 1920s. These floods left hundreds of people homeless particularly those living along the banks of the Bumbu River. Many houses were damaged or completely destroyed and hundreds of people at the Five Mile settlement along the Highland highway were also affected by mud-slides.

Meanwhile, provincial and national leaders met to find solutions to the problem of how to resettle people displaced by the disaster and to the north of the city a block of land was allocated, planned and developed for the resettlement of the disaster victims. This 'Tensiti' settlement was developed in 1992 on the former Serafini plantation with sealed road networks, water and electricity

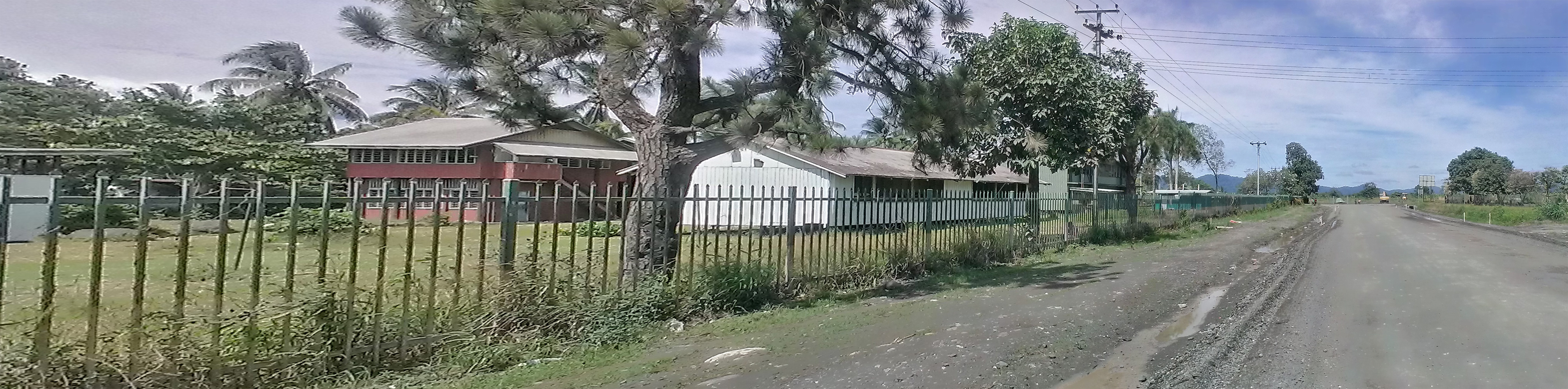
Panoramic photo of school at Tent City

== Housing ==
In May 1992, a study examined migrant settlement in and around Lae examining Tent Siti and West Taraka.

Tent Siti
Tensiti is situated in the northern part of the city and was first formed by people from Menyamya, Morobe Province in 1983. Now this settlement is composed of 30 households from Menyamya, 17 households from the Highlands areas, and 11 households from the Sepik areas. People live on government land and many of them work as wage earners. Examples of their occupations include a provincial officer, an employee of a private company, and a teacher. In addition, some of them are farmers in the city.

West Taraka
West Taraka is situated in the north-western part of the city, and Boundary Road is situated in the mid-western part of the city. Both have grown rapidly in the 1970's and 1980's by people coming mainly from the Highlands areas.

The study found that almost half of the informants (48.5%) came to Lae in the 1980s. The figure is much higher in Mouth Markham (66.7%). East Sepik Province (30.3%) and the provinces in the Highlands (30.3%) stand out as places where the informants lived before they came to Lae. This tendency corresponds to the fact that most respondents were born in the Sepik and Highlands areas and less than half of them have had former migration experiences.

In 2011 another study on housing was conducted drawing on the 1973 - 1974 urban household survey which revealed that less than 40% of the urban households had built and owned the houses they lived in. Five years after the establishment of the National Housing Corporation (NHC), another urban household survey revealed that only 10% of all houses in Lae were either rented or leased directly and the corresponding figure for Port Moresby was 23%

Another study by the Bank of Papua New Guinea examined the demand for urban housing finance which found that two factors discouraged individual investment in urban home-ownership in Papua New Guinea. Firstly the rental housing market in Papua New Guinea was, and still is, heavily subsidised by the government and associated with paying rates, taxes and other regular repair and maintenance costs. Secondly most Papua New Guineans held strong ties with their rural areas and many people were unprepared to sever these ties for several reasons, for instance, fear of being accused by wantoks (relatives and friends) of running away from rural obligations.

Public housing in Papua New Guinea is not only unavailable, but also unattainable for a large proportion (60.0%) of the urban population. It is evident that even the 1981 housing policy that encouraged national home-ownership schemes has not significantly increased home-ownership.
