= Wampar language =

Austronesian language

Wampar
- Laewomba
- Dzob Wampar
- Region: Markham Valley, New Guinea
- Native speakers: (5,200 cited 1990)
- Language family: Austronesian: Malayo-Polynesian; Oceanic; Western Oceanic; Huon Gulf; Markham; Lower Markham; Wampar

Language codes
- ISO 639-3: lbq
- Glottolog: wamp1247

Wampar (Dzob Wampar) is an Austronesian language of Wampar Rural LLG, Morobe Province, Papua New Guinea.

It is spoken in the 8 villages (wards) of Dzifasin (6.588454°S 146.579374°E), Tararan (6.543318°S 146.553226°E), Gabsongkeg (6.584546°S 146.757023°E), Ngasowapum (6.575056°S 146.822698°E), Munun (6.573319°S 146.849903°E), Mare (6.658412°S 146.682269°E), Gabandzidz (6.724186°S 146.769987°E), and Wamped (6.741034°S 146.670007°E).

== Phonology ==
The phonology consists of the following:

=== Consonants ===
		Labial	Alveolar	Palatal	Velar
Nasal		m	n		ŋ
Plosive	voiceless	p	t		k
Plosive	prenasal	ᵐp	ⁿt		ᵑk
Plosive	voiced	b	d		ɡ
Affricate	voiceless		ts		
Affricate	prenasal		ⁿts		
Affricate	voiced		dz		
Fricative		f	s		
Rhotic			r		
Approximant		w	l	j	

=== Vowels ===
	Front	Central	Back
High	i iː		u uː
Mid	e eː		o oː
Low		a aː	
