= MCY =

MCY or mcy may refer to:

- MCY, the IATA code for Sunshine Coast Airport, Queensland, Australia
- MCY, the NZX and ASX symbol for Mercury Energy, a New Zealand electric power company
- mcy, the ISO 639-3 code for South Watut language, Papua New Guinea
