= Nabak Rural LLG =

Local-level government in Papua New Guinea

- Location within Papua New Guinea
- Coordinates: 6.46°S 146.99°E
- Country: Papua New Guinea
- Province: Morobe Province
- Time zone: UTC+10 (AEST)

Nabak Rural LLG is a local-level government (LLG) of Morobe Province, Papua New Guinea. The Nabak language is spoken in the LLG.

== Wards ==
- 01. Satukimo
- 02. Yaquamu
- 03. Awen
- 04. Baindoang
- 05. Kwambelem
- 06. Kasanombe
- 07. Karangandoang
- 08. Kemen (Duwet language speakers)
- 09. Momsalop
- 10. Gwabadik
- 11. Gawam
- 12. Samanzing
- 13. Hobu
- 14. Sambuen
