= Manki, Papua New Guinea =

Village n Papua New Guinea

Manki
- Village
- Interactive map of Manki
- Coordinates: 7°10′0″S 146°34′0″E
- Country: Papua New Guinea
- Province: Morobe
- Elevation: 889 m (2,917 ft)

Manki is a village in Watut Rural LLG of Morobe Province, Papua New Guinea. It is located at 7°10'0S 146°34'0E with an altitude of 889 metres (2919 feet).
