= Duwet language =

Language

Duwet
- Guwot, Waing
- Region: New Guinea
- Native speakers: 400 (2011)
- Language family: Austronesian: Malayo-Polynesian; Oceanic; Western Oceanic; Huon Gulf; Markham; Lower Markham; Busu; Duwet

Language codes
- ISO 639-3: gve
- Glottolog: duwe1237
- ELP: Duwet
- Duwet is classified as Vulnerable by the UNESCO Atlas of the World's Languages in Danger.

Duwet, also known as Guwot or Waing, is an aberrant member of the Busu subgroup of Lower Markham languages in Morobe Province, Papua New Guinea. Duwet is spoken by about 400 people and appears to have been heavily influenced by its neighboring Nabak language (also called Wain) of the Papuan Trans–New Guinea languages. It is spoken in the three villages of Lambaip, Lawasumbileng, and Ninggiet.

Duwet is spoken in the three villages of Lambaip (6.460583°S 146.91932°E), Lawasumbileng, and Ninggiet in Nabak Rural LLG.

== Morphology ==
=== Pronouns and person markers ===
==== Subject prefixes ====
Person	Singular –past	Singular +past	Plural –past	Plural +past
1st person	nga-	ngga-	manga-	manga-
2nd person	ngu-	nggu-	manga-	manga-
3rd person	ngi-	nggi-	ngi-	nggi-

=== Numerals ===
Traditional Duwet numerals include only three basic forms: 'one', 'two', and 'hand (= five)'.

Numeral	Term	Gloss
1	ta(gine)/ta(ine)	'one'
2	seik	'two'
3	seik mba ta	'two and one'
4	seik mba seik	'two and two'
5	lima-ngg	'hand-my'
