= Aribwaung language =

Austronesian language spoken in New Guinea

Aribwaung
- Yalu
- Region: Markham Valley, New Guinea
- Ethnicity: 1,200 (2008?)
- Native speakers: 500 (2008)
- Language family: Austronesian: Malayo-Polynesian; Oceanic; Western Oceanic; Huon Gulf; Markham; Lower Markham; Busu; Aribwaung

Language codes
- ISO 639-3: ylu
- Glottolog: arib1240
- Coordinates: 6.595186°S 146.873813°E

Aribwaung (Aribwaungg), also known as Yalu (Jaloc), is an Austronesian language of Morobe Province, Papua New Guinea. It is spoken in the single village of Yalu (6.595186°S 146.873813°E) in Wampar Rural LLG.

== Phonology ==
=== Consonants ===
		Labial	Alveolar		Palatal	Velar	Glottal
		Labial	plain	sibilant	Palatal	Velar	Glottal
Nasal		m	n			ŋ	
Plosive/ Affricate	voiceless	p	t	ts		k	
Plosive/ Affricate	voiced	(b)		dz			
Plosive/ Affricate	prenasal vl.	ᵐp	ⁿt	(ⁿts)		ᵑk	
Plosive/ Affricate	prenasal vd.	ᵐb	ⁿd	ⁿdz		ᵑɡ	
Fricative	voiceless	f		s			h
Fricative	voiced	β					
Rhotic			r				
Approximant		w	(l)		j		

- /β/ may also be heard as a voiced plosive [b] in free variation among speakers.
- /r/ may range to a lateral [l] in free variation among speakers.
- /ⁿts/ only occurs in a few examples.
- Sounds /ts, ⁿts, dz, ⁿdz/ may have palatalized [tʃ, ⁿtʃ, dʒ, ⁿdʒ] and non-palatalized allophones, alternating freely in all positions.
- /h/ is rare.

=== Vowels ===
	Front	Central	Back
High	i		u
Mid	ɛ		ɔ
Low		a	
