= Nadzab =

- Village
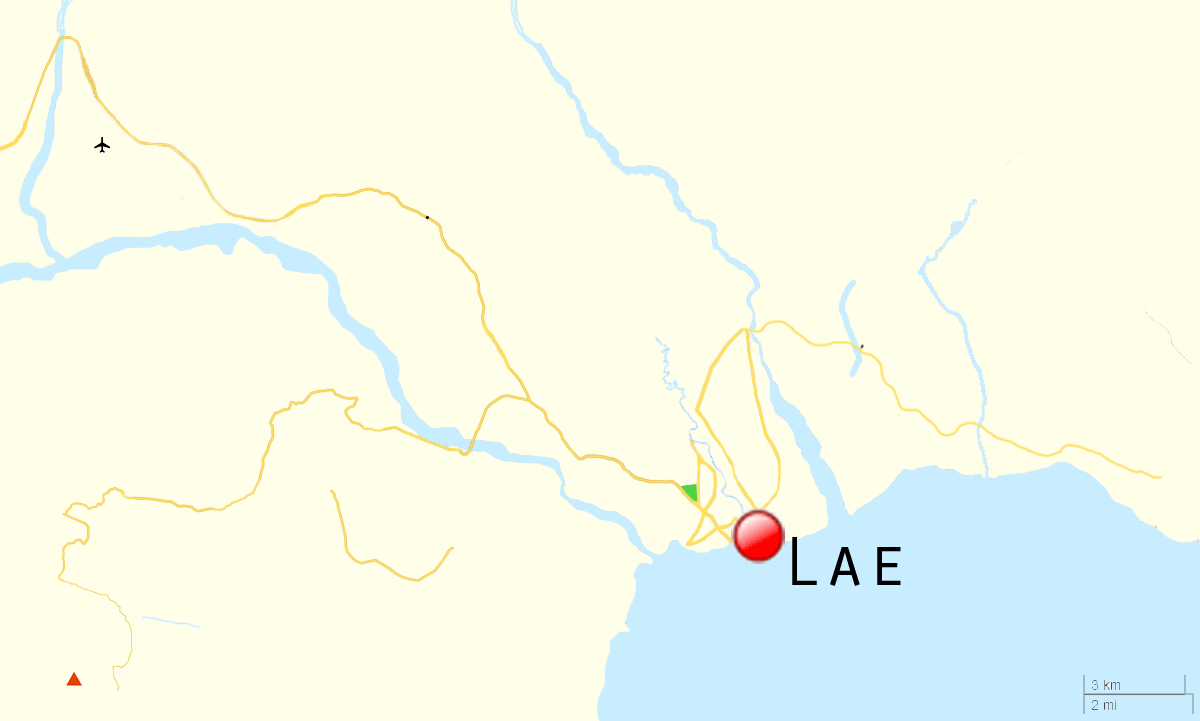
- Location in the Lae area
- Coordinates: 6°32′0″S 146°40′0″E
- Country: Papua New Guinea
- Province: Morobe Province
- District: Huon District
- LLG: Wampar LLG
- Time zone: UTC+10 (AEST)

Nadzab Village is in the Markham Valley, Morobe Province, Papua New Guinea on the Highlands Highway. Administratively, it is located in Gabsongkeg ward of Wampar Rural LLG. The Nadzab Airport is located East of Nadzab Village and was the site of the only Allied paratrooper assault in New Guinea on 5 September 1943.

== Location ==
Nadzab is located on the Erap River, 5 kilometres (3.1 mi) North of the Markham River and 42.5 kilometres (26.4 mi)42 km North West of Lae. The settlements of Gabmatsung/Gabmatzung and Gabsonkek are located on the East side of the airport.

== Grasslands ==
The present distribution of grasslands in New Guinea is a product of forest clearance and/or burning by man. Lane-Poole (1925), on surveying the forest of the lower Markham Valley near Yalu, hypothesised that;

"At one time forest of this type stretched all the way along the coast between the mountains inland and the sea, and all along the vast valleys of the Markham and Ramu Rivers. Today, artificially formed grasslands have taken the place of the forest on the best of the land, and, in the less fertile areas, a secondary weed growth has established itself"

== History ==
=== German Colonial ===
In about 1910 the Gabmatsung/Gabmazung Lutheran mission station was established at Nadzab. and established an airfield for use by small planes until the outbreak of the Pacific War when it became overgrown with dense kunai grass.

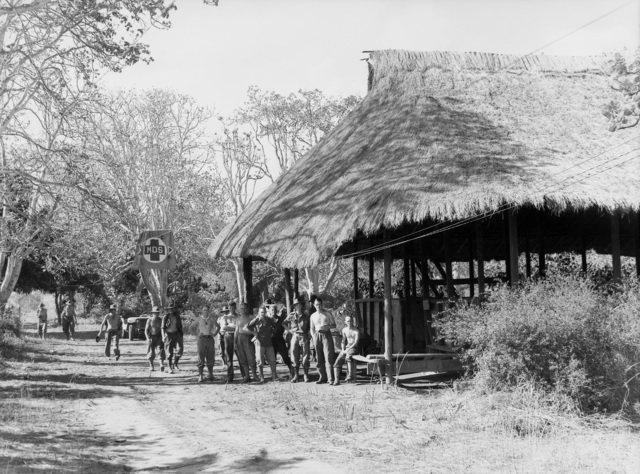
The Admission Centre of the 2/4th Australian Field Ambulance Main Dressing Station, 7th Australian Division, formerly the Gabmatzung Lutheran Mission Church.

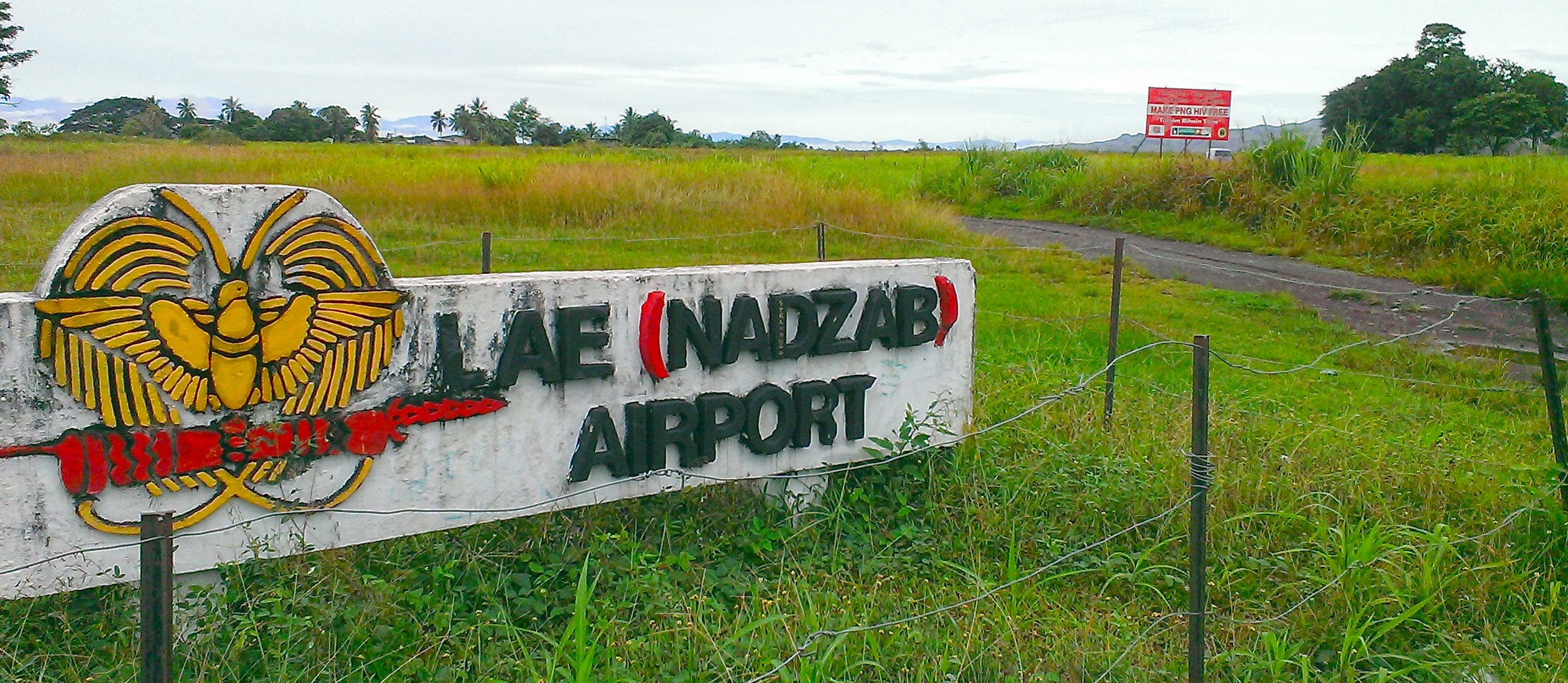
Photo of Nadzab airport sign. Village in background

In the 1919 the Melbourne Argus newspaper ran this classified advertisement;

The following items, collected by on Official with the Aid of An Armed Force from Gabmatsung (and other districts) -carved figures, stone clubs, carved plates, bows and arrows, spears, native drum, clubs, horns, modlooms, native pillows, head dresses, bags, shells ornaments and butterflies. JW Styles and Son, Glenhuntly Rd, Caufield

=== WW2 ===
Between April 1943 and July 1943, the Allied Geographical Section of South West Pacific Area (command) conducted reconnaissance after the Japanese invasion. The Terrain Handbook states at page 18;

"Nadzab is located twenty-seven miles NW of Lae by road 900 yds by an indefinite width. Covered with Kunai grass. Good dispursal area. Emergency landing ground for heavy freight planes. Extension to 2000 yds thought possible".

The Landing at Nadzab was the first parachute jump for the 503rd Parachute Regiment on 5 September 1943. In conjunction with the Amphibious Landing East of Malahang, it was to be the start of the liberation of Lae from Japanese Occupation.

On 8 September 1943, MACARTHUR'S communique states;

more than 60,000 rounds of ammunition, silencing artillery positions and destroying installations at Gabsonkek (21 miles north-west of Lae), Munum (six miles east of Gabsonkek). Yalu, Nara kapor (14 miles North west of Lae), and Labu Island (60 miles south-west of Lae)

After the landing, the 503rd Headquarters Company established themselves at the Gabonkek village and it was at this time that the descending wildcat logo became their official insignia, until the Battle of Philippines when the insignia was changed to the Rock Patch.

On 19 September 1943 the Gabmatsung Lutheran Mission was converted into the 2/4th Australian Field Ambulance main dressing station for the 7th Australian Division

=== Cemetery ===
During WW2, the United States Army established a cemetery used for the duration of the war. All burials were later exhumed and transported to the United States or Manila American Cemetery.

=== Aerial spraying ===
In 1992 the Veterans' Review Board (Australia) (Note: see Bessie Florence Mcmahon and Repatriation Commission [1992] AATA 241, Administrative Appeals Tribunal (Australia)) heard evidence that chemical DDT aerial spraying and Pyrethrum bombs may have been used in and around Nadzab in November 1944. Number 9 Local Air Supply Unit located at Lae, carried out test air-spraying in an unspecified location in March 1945. The United States Army Air Service units at Nadzab carried out DDT air-spraying experiments locally up to at least November 1944, until about April 1945.
