= Wampur language =

Austronesian language of Madang Province, Papua New Guinea

Wampur
- Native to: Papua New Guinea
- Region: Madang Province
- Native speakers: (530 cited 2000 census)
- Language family: Austronesian: Malayo-Polynesian; Oceanic; Western Oceanic; North New Guinea ?; Ngero–Vitiaz ?; Huon Gulf; Markham; Upper; Wampur

Language codes
- ISO 639-3: waz
- Glottolog: wamp1248

Wampur is a minor Austronesian language of Madang Province, Papua New Guinea. It is spoken in the two villages of Wampur (6.376584°S 146.15515°E) and Mirir (6.422483°S 146.156993°E) in Onga-Waffa Rural LLG.
