= Situm =

- Ex-Servicemen Block
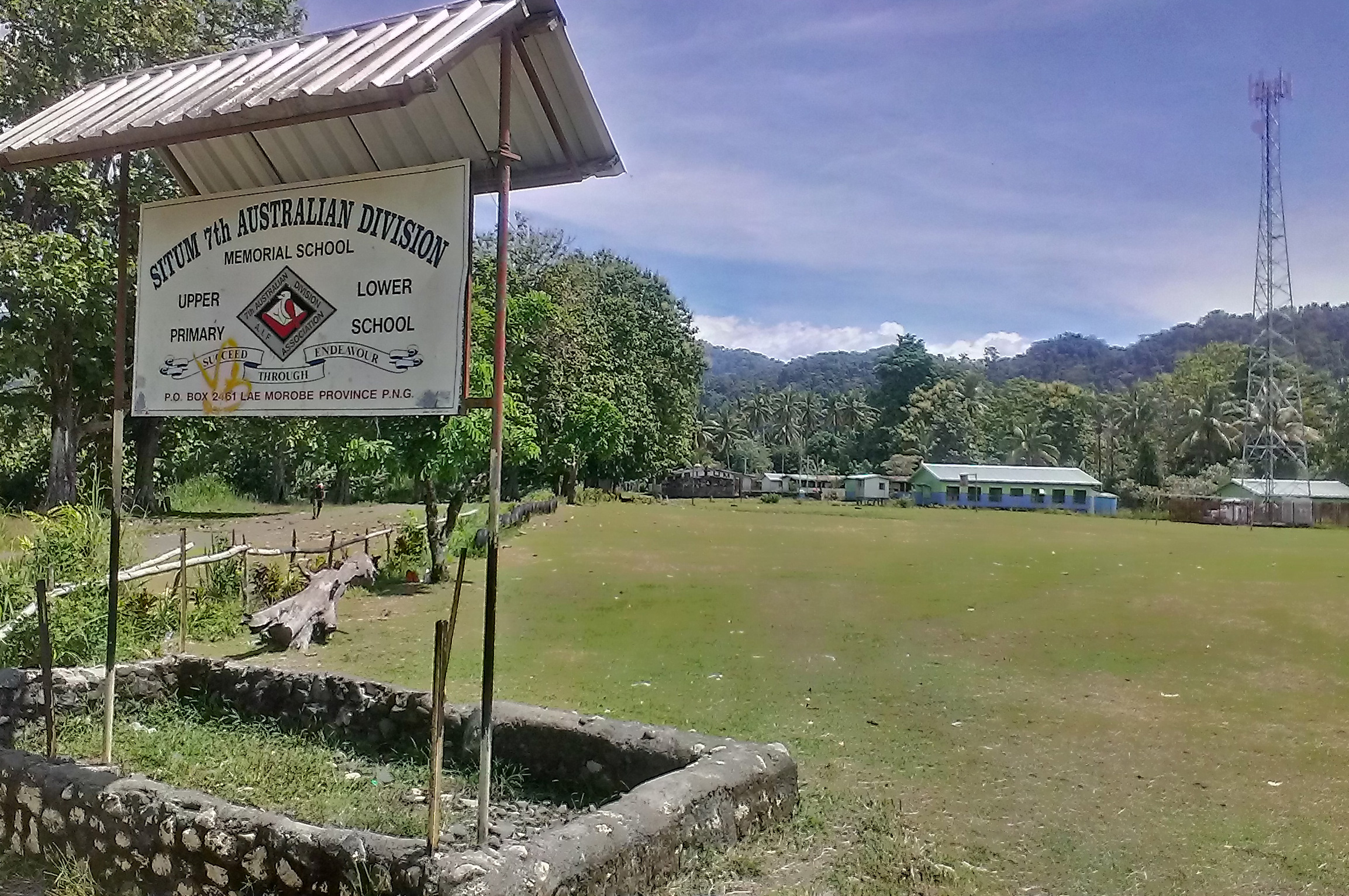
- Situm - 7th Australian Division Memorial School

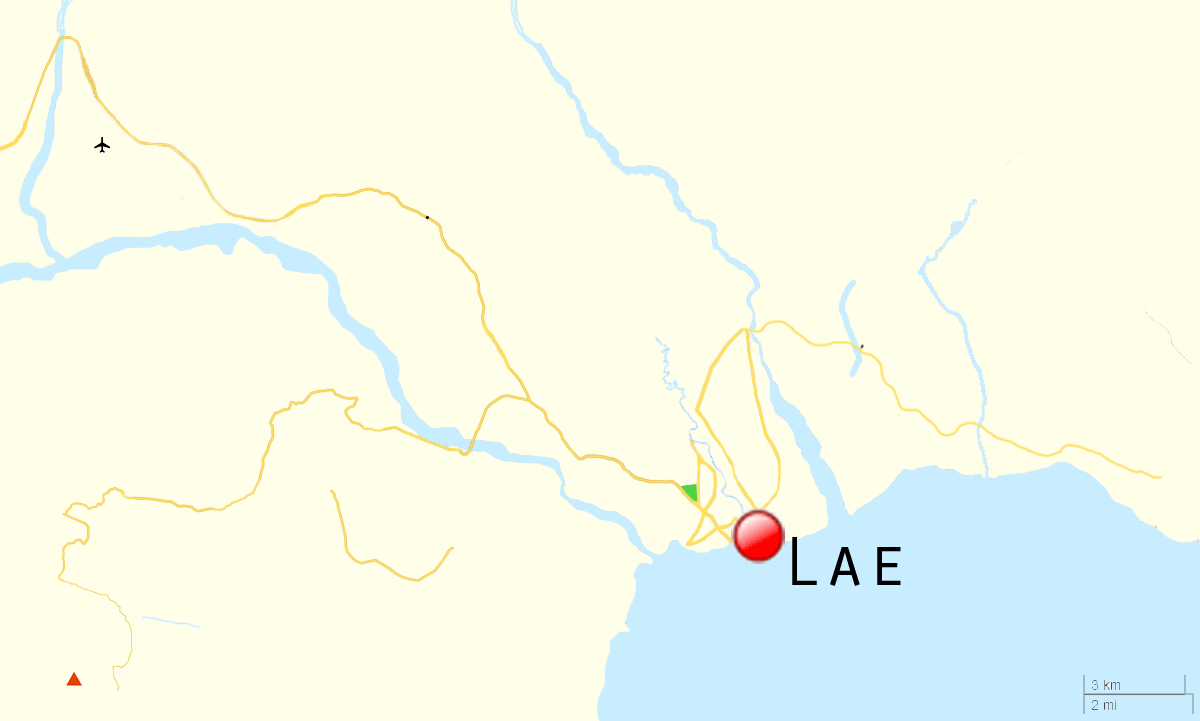
- Location in the Lae area
- Coordinates: 6°40′41″S 147°3′19″E
- Country: Papua New Guinea
- Province: Morobe Province
- District: Nawaeb District
- LLG: Labuta Rural LLG
- Time zone: UTC+10 (AEST)

Situm is a government ex-servicemen block outside of Lae in Labuta Rural LLG, Morobe Province, Papua New Guinea.

== Geography ==
=== Location ===
Situm is located 20 kilometres (12 mi) north-east of Lae, on The Bukawa-Finchaffen National Highway Road across the Busu river and over the Bupu River causeway. It is 170 metres (560 ft) above sea level.

=== Geology ===
The area around Situm is located on the Pacific Ring of Fire and geologic instability has produced numerous faults, resulting in earthquakes. Situm sits between the larger Indo-Australian Plate and the Pacific Plate on the South Bismarck Plate in the Ramu-Markham Fault Zone where the New Guinea Highlands Deforming Zone and South Bismarck tectonic plates are converging at up to 50 millimetres (2.0 in)/yr and the seismic hazard is significant.

The Ramu-Markham Fault Zone, which follows the northern edge of the Markham Valley, is the active plate boundary between the South Bismarck Plate and terranes within the New Guinea Highlands Deforming Zone. The Ramu-Markham Fault Zone has generated large thrust earthquakes (e.g. the 6 April 1999 MW 6.4, 16 kilometres (9.9 mi) north of Lae, near Hobu, and the 22 November 2007 MW 6.8, 110 kilometres (68 mi) north of Lae). Geological evidence suggests that major earthquakes in pre-historic times have occurred in this area, and that there is the potential for another large earthquake to occur anytime within the next 100 years.

=== Tectonic study ===
Situm is the location of a geodetic monitoring site which aims to monitor the tectonic motion of Papua New Guinea. The site ID is 'SITU' and is monitored by the Geodynamics group and the University of California.

== History ==
=== World War II ===
Situm is located to the north of the beaches where the Australian 7th Division carried out an amphibious landing in September 1943, as part of plans to capture Lae from the Japanese during the Salamaua–Lae campaign. During that campaign and the subsequent advance into the Finisterre Range, the locals assisted the Allied troops and after the war, the Australian 7th Division AIF Association helped construct a school at Situm in 1964 as a thank you.

=== Settlements ===
Before the establishment of the Situm and Gobari settlements, the area was covered in rainforest and patches of Kunai grass. At the beginning of field research in 1968, Situm consisted of 22 blocks. Among the Situm settlers there were 16 block holders involved in cattle and pig production. Settlers also harvest coconuts from plantations.

=== Climate ===
Rainfall in Situm has been recorded at 4000mm per year.

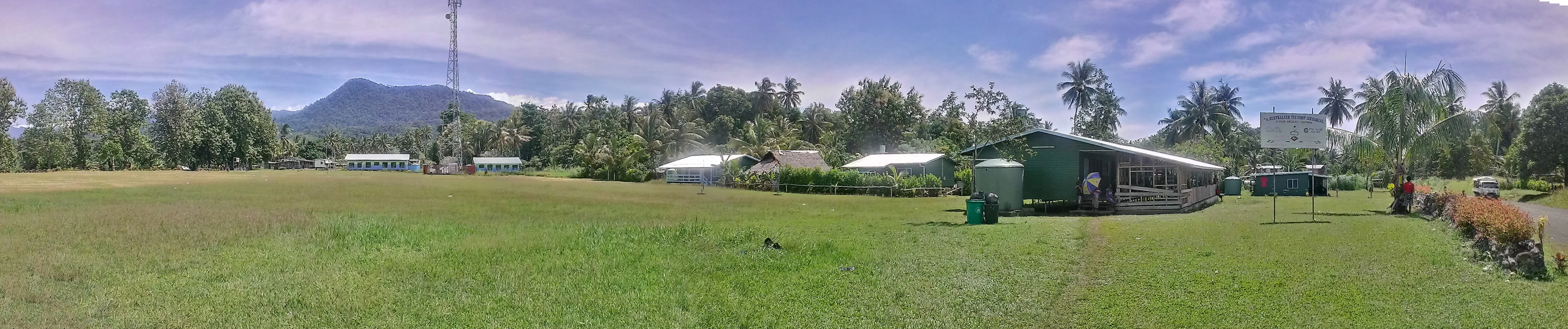
Panoramic photo of Situm Community. Health centre on right and 7th Australian Division Memorial School on left

== Demographics ==
=== Community ===
In October 2013, a Health Foundation team has conducted a three-day workshop in Situm ex-servicemen block, which attracted a total of 63 participants (30 females and 33 males) and allowed women and men to learn about sexual health issues and strengthen their relationship.

In July 2013, the Rotary Club of Lae delivered a 5KVA generator to Situm School, and four Tuffa Tanks to the Situm Medical Centre and plumbing hardware to the Situm Health Centre.

In 2009, the World Health Organization reported cholera cases in the ex-servicemen block of Situm. In Morobe Province settlements of East Taraka, Uniblock, Nawae Block, Salamander Tais, 12 Mile, Bumayong, Tanam, 6 Mile, 1 Mile, Talair Compound and 2nd street were affected. This is the first confirmed cholera outbreak since the 1960s and PNG officials fear it will further burden their struggling health system. The prevalence of enteric diseases remains high in PNG where access to safe drinking water is limited, particularly in rural areas where an estimated 87% of the population lives.

== Economy ==
=== Banana chips ===
Situm women are producing dried banana chips for production as a popular snack.

=== Taro ===
In the 1940s Taro Leaf Blight caused by Phytophthora colocasiae was estimated to cause up to 50% loss in production. In 1993, a National Taro breeding program, with the focus on breeding Taro varieties resistant varieties, commenced.

By 2000 Situm farmers had given up planting Taro (Colocasia esculenta Schott) because of taro beetles from the genera Papuana and Eucopidocaulus.

=== Recreational fishing ===
The Situm Primary School has been described as one of the best fishing or outdoors adventure locations in the regions of Asia/Pacific.

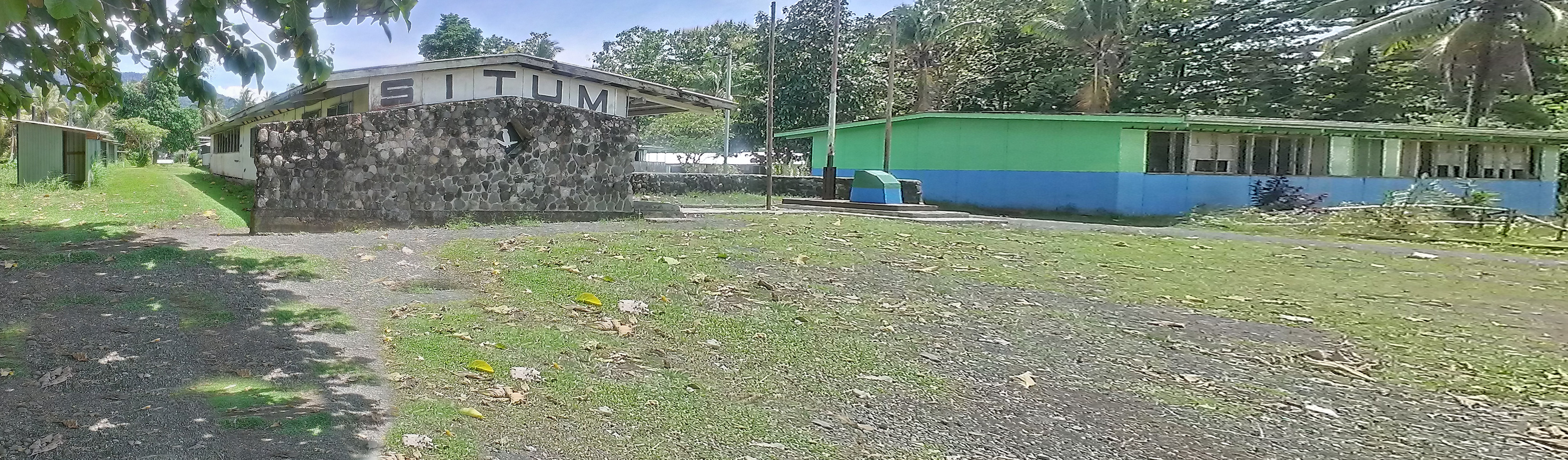
7th Australian Division Memorial School, Situm

== Culture ==
In 2004, three members from Situm formed a band called Lungstar of Morobe and have had their debut album recorded and released with the A20 Productions Studio of Barakau.

=== Situm Primary School ===
In May 2008, Evangelical Lutheran Church of PNG leader, the late Bishop Doctor Wesley Kigasung, was laid to rest at his Aluki village in Bukawa, Morobe province. What was described as one of the most-moving scenes, Situm primary school, children sang a touching tribute to Dr Kigasung which brought tears to the eyes of those in the motorcade.
