= Watut Rural LLG =

Local-level government in Papua New Guinea

- Location within Papua New Guinea
- Coordinates: 7.25°S 146.53°E
- Country: Papua New Guinea
- Province: Morobe Province
- Time zone: UTC+10 (AEST)

Watut Rural LLG is a local-level government (LLG) of Morobe Province, Papua New Guinea. The Watut language is spoken in the LLG.

== Wards ==
- 01. Menhi
- 02. Hawata
- 03. Pararoa
- 04. Andarora
- 05. Society (including Manki village)
- 06. Sapanda
- 07. Gawapu
- 08. Nauti Aid Post
- 09. Ekopa
- 10. Baini
- 11. Kebi
- 12. Malangta

== See also ==
- Watut River
