= Labuta Rural LLG =

Local-level government in Papua New Guinea

- Country: Papua New Guinea
- Province: Morobe Province
- Time zone: UTC+10 (AEST)

Labuta Rural LLG is a local-level government (LLG) of Morobe Province, Papua New Guinea.

== Wards ==
- 01. Tamigidu
- 02. Boac
- 03. Buingim
- 04. Ee'c
- 05. Wideru
- 06. Bukawa (Bukawa language speakers)
- 07. Mundala
- 08. Yambo
- 09. Buhalu
- 10. Waganluhu
- 11. Apo
- 12. Musom/Tale (Musom language speakers)
- 13. Situm
- 14. Momolili
