= Aribwatsa language =

Language

Aribwatsa
- Lae, Ahi
- Aribwatsa
- Native to: Papua New Guinea
- Region: New Guinea
- Ethnicity: Lahe, Aribwatsa (subgroup)
- Native speakers: (1 rememberer cited 1997)
- Language family: Austronesian: Malayo-Polynesian; Oceanic; Western Oceanic; Huon Gulf; Markham; Lower Markham; Busu; Aribwatsa

Language codes
- ISO 639-3: laz
- Glottolog: arib1241

Aribwatsa, also known as Lae or Lahe, is an extinct member of the Busu subgroup of Lower Markham languages in the area of Lae, Morobe Province, Papua New Guinea. Descendants of the Aribwatsa-speaking community have mostly switched to the Bukawa language, which is spoken all along the north coast of the Huon Gulf and in several villages on the south coast. One old woman, Butoawê, remembered the language in 1997.

== Further ==
- Susanne Holzknecht (1989). The Markham Languages of Papua New Guinea. Pacific Linguistics. ISBN 0-85883-394-8.
- Wurm, S.A., ed. (1997). Some Endangered Languages of Papua New Guinea: Kaki Ae, Musom, and Aribwatsa. Pacific Linguistics D-89. The Australian National University. ISBN 0-85883-467-7. ISSN 0078-7566.
