= Butibum =

Butibam
- Suburb
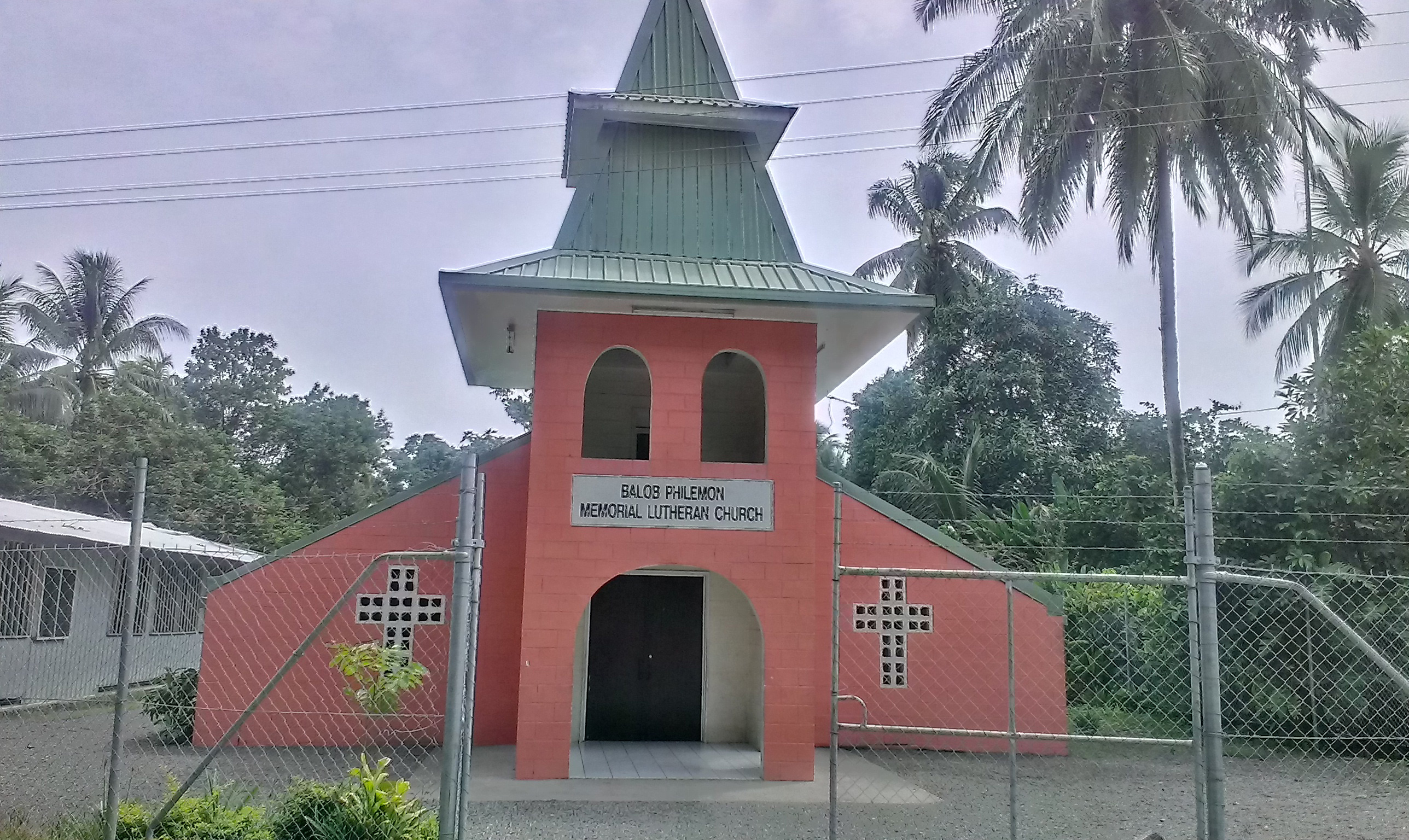
- Balob Lutheran Church in Butibam

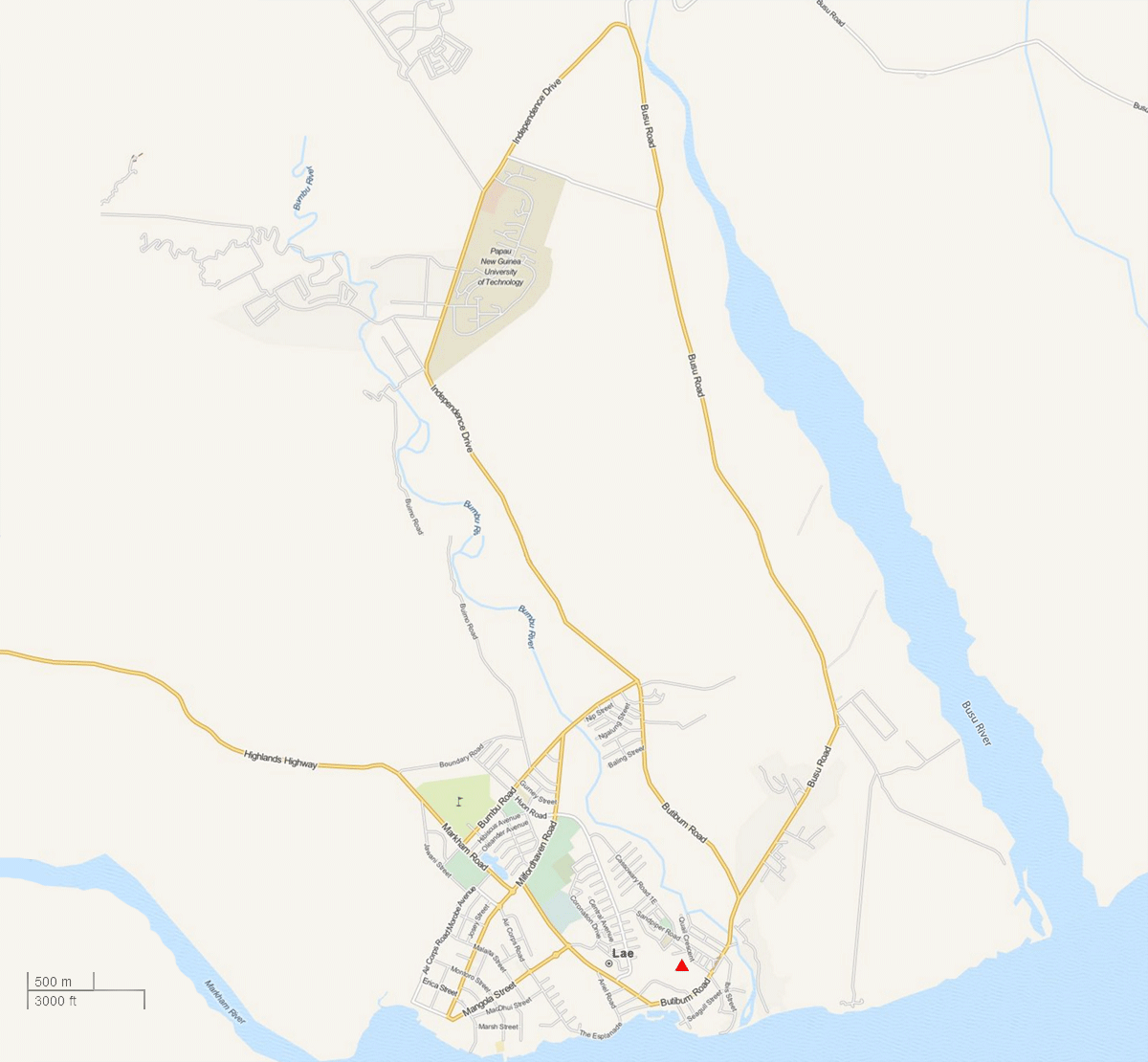
- Location in Lae
- Coordinates: 6°43′30″S 147°0′10″E
- Country: Papua New Guinea
- Province: Morobe Province
- District: Lae District
- Time zone: UTC+10 (AEST)

Butibam is a village on the outskirts of Lae, Morobe Province in Papua New Guinea.

== Location ==
Butibam lies to the east of the Bumbu River and north of Busu Road. The Butibam market and primary school lies to the south of Busu Road. The Buku (Sepik) settlement lies to the south of the primary school and covers up to the Huon Gulf beach.

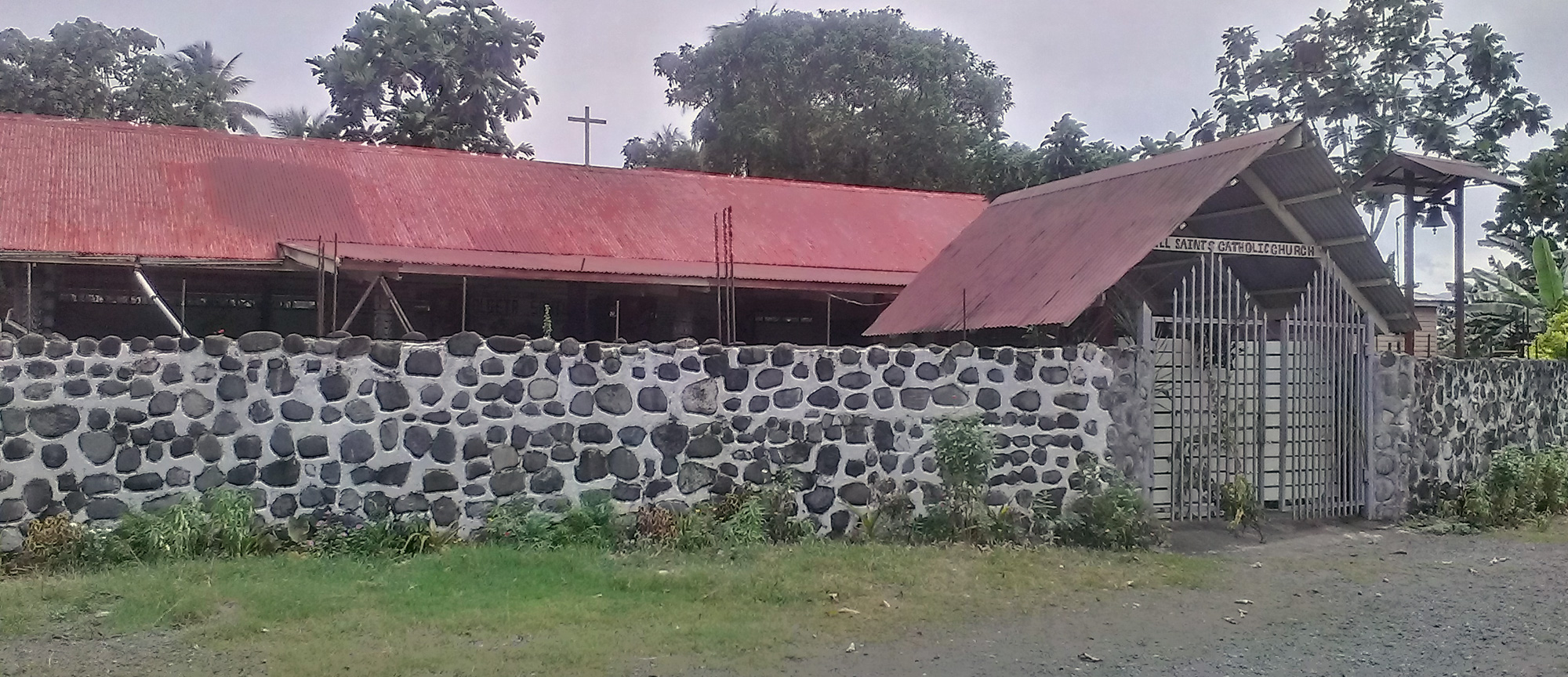
Photo of All Saints Catholic Church at Buko (Sepik) Settlement South of Butibam. Taken 29 January 2014

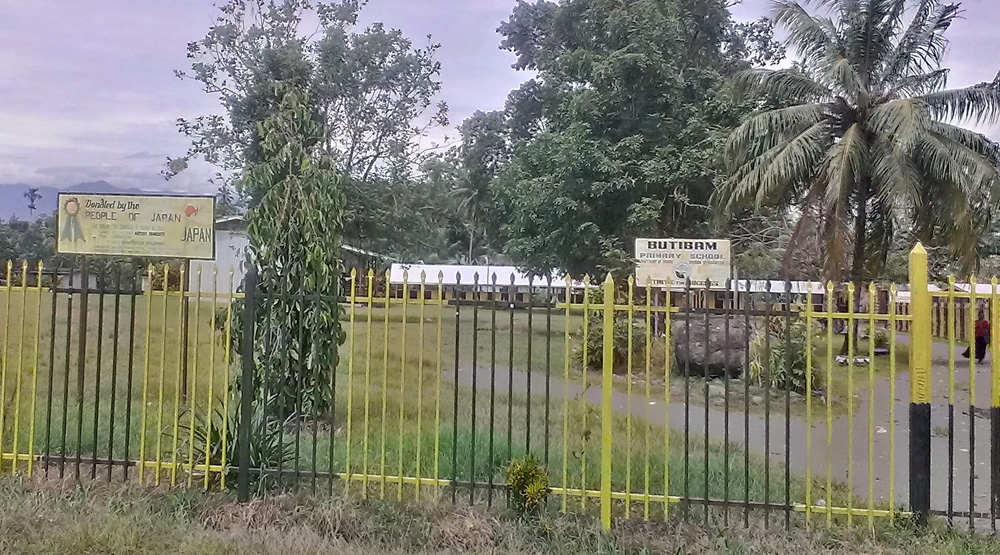
Photo of Butibam Primary school Taken 29 January 2014

== Churches ==
Following a dispute with the German New Guinea Company, Pastor Gottfried Schmutterer from the Neuendettelsau Mission Society was forced to relocate his original mission camp in July 1912 and was offered a location on the banks of the Bumbu known as Ampo. The Ampo Lutheran Church was built in 1937 and later used as a WW2 field hospital and remains the oldest building in Lae. Several Lutheran churches, schools and headquarter buildings now occupy the surrounds.

In the 1920s, the Lutheran Church had a significant impact on the Butibum and Malahang communities and garnered a great deal of loyalty to the faith. By way of example, in 1971, the Roman Catholic mission decided to erect a church in the Bumbu settlement to serve the Sepik community there. The Butibum people generally regarded this move as sacrilege because they believed their lands, on which the new church stands, are hallowed by the Lutheran faith.

== WW2 ==
Under Japanese occupation many Butibam villages resisted the occupation. A villager called Kamakang received beatings from Japanese soldiers for aiding the allied coastwatchers.

When Lae fell to the Allies, the Japanese had two possible routes by which to reach Madang, their base on the north coast. One was to go through the Markham Valley, where it would have been easy for the Allies to attack them from the air. This meant the Japanese had to take to the interior, through the rugged Saruwaged and Finisterre Ranges, to reach Madang. The Japanese left Butibum and followed the Busu River over the Saruwaged, to eventually reach Kiari in Sio on the north coast.

== Gravel supplies ==
In December 2012, landowners from the six clans of Butibam village signed an agreement to work together with their company, Butibum Progress Ltd, in a multi-million kina contract to supply gravel to the Lae Port Tidal Basin Project.

== Notable people ==
- Pobuc Jonathan
- Major Bill Mollard – worked in Lae in the pre-war years with Vacuum Oil Company (Mobil), he was known to the local Butibum villagers as 'masta Benzine. Major Bill Mollard's 2/32nd Battalion occupied Pabu Hill, named after his good and faithful Butibum friend, on November 20, 1943.
- Loujaya Kouza - current Member of Parliament, she wrote and performed the song, Keep the Fire Alive with the group Tambaran Culture as a tribute to the 9th South Pacific Games held in Port Moresby in 1991
- Bart Philemon - Former Lae City Open Member
