= Markham languages =

Subgroup of the Huon Gulf languages

Markham
- Geographic distribution: Madang and Morobe Provinces, Papua New Guinea
- Linguistic classification: Austronesian: Malayo-Polynesian; Oceanic; Western Oceanic; North New Guinea ?; Ngero–Vitiaz ?; Huon Gulf; Markham
- Proto-language: Proto-Markham

Language codes
- Glottolog: mark1257

The Markham languages form a family of the Huon Gulf languages. It consists of a dozen languages spoken in the Ramu Valley, Markham Valley and associated valley systems in the lowlands of the Madang and Morobe Provinces of Papua New Guinea. Unlike almost other Western Oceanic languages of New Guinea, which are spoken exclusively in coastal areas, many Markham languages are spoken in the mountainous interior of Morobe Province, Papua New Guinea, where they are in heavy contact with Trans-New Guinea languages.

Although the Markham languages are Austronesian, they have had much contact with neighboring Papuan languages.

A phonological reconstruction of Proto-Markham is presented in Holzknecht (1989) and is summarized below.

== Languages ==
Labu (= Hapa)

Lower Markham
Aribwaung (= Aribwaungg, Yalu), Aribwatsa^{†} (= Lae, Lahe), Musom, Nafi (= Sirak), Duwet (= Guwot, Waing), Wampar, Silisili (Middle Watut), Maralango (South Watut), Dangal (South Watut)
Upper Markham
Adzera (dialect cluster: Sarasira, Sukurum), Mari, Wampur

== Proto-Markham ==
Proto-Markham
- Reconstruction of: Markham languages
- Reconstructed ancestors: Proto-Austronesian: Proto-Malayo-Polynesian; Proto-Oceanic; Proto-Huon Gulf

Proto-Markham was reconstructed by Susanne Holzknecht in 1989 in her paper The Markham Languages of Papua New Guinea. It descends from Proto-Huon Gulf on the basis of shared phonological, morphosyntactic and lexicosemantic innovations, such as the merger of Proto-Huon Gulf *t, *r, and *R as Proto-Markham *r, the accretion of *ka- into focal pronoun bases (Proto-Oceanic *kamu "you" > Proto-Markham *ka-gam "id."), and the replacement of Proto-Oceanic *qacan "name" by Proto-Markham *biŋa "id.", among many others.

=== Vowels ===
The vowels of Proto-Markham, according to Holzknecht, are:

Vowels
	Front	Central	Back
Close	*i		*u
Close-mid	*e		*o
Open		*a	

=== Consonants ===
The consonants of Proto-Markham, according to Holzknecht, are:

Consonants
		Labiovelar	Bilabial	Alveolar	Palatal	Velar
Stop	voiced		*b	*d	*ɟ	*g
Stop	voiceless	*kʷ	*p	*t	*c	*k
Nasal		*mʷ	*m, *ᵐb	*n, *ⁿd	*ᶮɟ	*ŋ, *ᵑɡ
Fricative			*f	*s		
Approximant		*w		*l, *r		

== See also ==
- Huon Gulf
- Huon Gulf languages
- Numbami language
- Oceanic languages
- Austronesian languages
