= Labu language =

Austronesian language of Papua New Guinea

Lebu
- Native to: Papua New Guinea
- Region: Morobe Province
- Ethnicity: 1,500 (2000)
- Language family: Austronesian: Malayo-Polynesian; Oceanic; Western Oceanic; North New Guinea ?; Ngero–Vitiaz ?; Huon Gulf; Markham; Lower Markham; Lebu

Language codes
- ISO 639-3: lbu
- Glottolog: labu1248
- ELP: Labu

Labu (called Hapa by its speakers) is an Austronesian language of Papua New Guinea.

== Locations ==
Labu is spoken by 1,600 people (1989) in three older villages and one new one across the Markham River from Lae in Morobe Province, Papua New Guinea. The three older villages are Labubutu (locally known as Dusuku) (6.752271°S 146.960701°E), Labumeti (Ehalo) (6.772936°S 146.955698°E), and Labutali (Kakala) (6.87921°S 146.951178°E) in Wampar Rural LLG.

== Contact ==
Although it belongs to the Lower Markham languages, Labu appears to have been strongly influenced by the coastal languages of the Huon Gulf, Bukawa in particular. For instance, Labu shows tonal contrasts, like Bukawa but unlike any of the Markham languages; and Labu numerals show separate forms for '3', '4', and '5', like Bukawa, even though salu '2', sidi '3', and sôha '4' contain the Lower Markham numeral classifier *sV-. (The pattern for numerals in the other Markham languages is '1', '2', '2+1', '2+2', then 'hand' or '2+2+1', and so on.)

== Phonology ==
Labu distinguishes 7 vowels and 17 consonants. The vowels also exhibit contrasts between high and low pitch (or "tone"), just as in Yabêm, the Lutheran mission lingua franca for the coastal languages of Morobe Province during much of the 20th century. The orthography of Labu is based on that of Yabêm (= Jabêm), except that y replaces Yabêm j.

=== Vowels ===
	Front	Central	Back
High	i		u
Upper mid	ɪ		ʊ
Lower mid	ɛ		ɔ
Low		a	

=== Consonants ===
	Bilabial	Coronal	Velar	Glottal
Voiceless stop	p	t	k	
Voiced stop	b	d	ɡ	
Prenasalized	ᵐb	ⁿd	ᵑɡ	
Nasal	m	n	ŋ	
Fricative		s		h
Lateral		l		
Approximant	w	j		

=== Tone contrasts ===
The vowels of some words in Labu are distinguished by lowered pitch, which is marked orthographically by a grave accent. Labu distinctions in tone are thus based on register tone, not contour tone as in Mandarin Chinese. Register tone contrasts are a relatively recent innovation of the North Huon Gulf languages, which many Labu speakers include in their linguistic repertoires, so one should not look back to voice contrasts in Proto-Oceanic (POc) or some other ancestral language to explain the origins of tone contrasts in Labu. Instead, one should look to areal influences, primarily from neighboring Bukawa.

High	Low
a 'sun'	à 'tree, wood' (POc *kayu)
ani 'centipede' (POc *qalipan)	ànì 'one' (indefinite article)
maya 'shame'	mayà 'dead' (POc *mate)
ôpa 'crocodile' (POc *puqaya)	ôpà 'thought'
ô 'breadfruit' (POc *kuluR)	ồ 'garden' (POc *quma)
u 'rain' (POc *qusan)	ù 'clay pot' (POc *kuron)

== Morpho-syntax ==
=== Pronouns and person markers ===
==== Free pronouns ====
Person	Singular	Dual (D)	Trial (T)	Plural (P)
1st person inclusive		a(lu)	(ê)sidi	a(ha)
1st person exclusive	ai	(ê)ma(lu)	êmidi	(ê)ma(ha)
2nd person	yê	(yê)môlu	(yê)môdi	(yê)môha
3rd person	ini	(ê)salu	(ê)sidi	(ê)sôha

=== Possession ===
In Labu, there are two types of possessive noun phrases: the genitive and the nominal (Siegel, 1984, p. 95).

==== Genitive possession ====
Person	Singular	Plural
1st person inclusive		la
1st person exclusive	nda	mê
2nd person	na	mê
3rd person	na	sê

The genitive possessive noun phrase (PNP) conforms to the following structure:

PNP → NP1 (=possessor) POS (=possessive marker) NP2 (=possessed) (Siegel, 1984, p. 95)

If the possessor has already been established earlier in the discourse and it is clear to both the speaker and listener, then the NP1 can be omitted from the possessive phrase (Siegel, 1984, p. 95). If the omitted NP1 is an inanimate object then the possessive marker êna is used (Siegel, 1984, p. 96).

Some examples of the genitive possessive noun phrase (taken from Siegel's Introduction of the Labu Language, p. 95-96) are as follows:

(a) ai yu-dumala kô yê na ana

I 1S.PT-look at you 2S.POS mother

I saw your mother.

(b) amêna ŋatô salu le sê hanô nda mêna

man old two this 3P.POS house stay village

These two old men's house was in the village.

(c) êmôha mô-kôna êna taiya mê-nda nôsôlô

we.XD 1X-look.at POS tyre 1P-stay rubbish

We looked at its tyre in the rubbish dump.

Nominal possession

Nominal possessive markers	Singular	Plural (D,T,P)
1st person inclusive		lêêna
1st person exclusive	ndêêna	mêêna
2nd person	nôôna	môôna
3rd person	nêêna	sêêna

The nominal possessive phrase (PNP) conforms to the following structure:

PNP → NP1 (possessor) POSN (nominal possessive marker) (Siegel, 1984, p. 96)

When the thing being possessed is not explicitly stated within the phrase then the nominal possessive phrase is used (Siegel, 1984, p. 96). If the possessor has already been established earlier in the discourse then the NP1 can be omitted from a possessive phrase (Siegel, 1984, p. 97).

Some examples of the nominal possessive phrase (taken from Jeff Siegel's Introduction to the Labu Language, p. 96-97) are as follows:

(a) ini gwê yê nôôna

he (3S.PT-)take you 2S.POSN

He took yours.

(b) tawala lene hanô lênê nêêna

door this house that 3S.POSN

This door is that house's.

(c) ai ya-gwê ndêêna

I 1S.PT-take 1S.POSN

I took mine.

=== Deictics ===
Labu deictics correlate with first, second, and third person, the first two of which have long and short forms. The third person singular free pronoun can also take deictic suffixes: ini-ne 'this/these one(s)', ini-lê 'that/those one(s)'. Deictics may occur either in place of nouns or postposed to nouns, as in hanô lene 'that house'.

- le(ne) 'near speaker'
- lê(nê) 'near addressee'
- laê 'away from speaker or addressee'

=== Numerals ===
Traditional Labu counting practices started with the digits of one hand, then continued on the other hand, and then the feet to reach '20', which translates as 'one person'. Higher numbers are multiples of 'one person'. Nowadays, most counting above '5' is done in Tok Pisin.

Numeral	Term	Gloss
1	tôgwatô/ànì	'one'
2	salu	'two'
3	sidi	'three'
4	sôha	'four'
5	ma-ipi	'hands-half/part'
6	ma-ipi anêndi tôgwatô (or maipa tômôlô)	'hands-half offspring/addition one'
7	ma-ipi anêndi salu (or maipa salu)	'hands-half offspring/addition two'
8	ma-ipi anêndi sidi (or maipa sidi)	'hands-half offspring/addition three'
9	ma-ipi anêndi sôha (or maipa sôha)	'hands-half offspring/addition four'
10	nômusu	'ten'
20	asamô-ni	'whole-one' (samô 'whole', ànì 'one')
60	asamô sidi	'whole three'

=== Names ===
Like most of the coastal languages around the Huon Gulf, Labu has a system of birth-order names.

Birth order	Sons (ai)	Daughters (ahêna)
1	aso	amê
2	amoa	hiya
3	aŋgi	aya
4	aŋgu	êta
5	ôlôndi	hênamu
6	?	asô`lô`/amênamu
7	asô`lô`	asôlô
8	asôlô	?
9	paloa	?

=== Negation ===
In order to express negation within simple sentences in Labu, either a dubitative (DUB) or a potential (POT) modal must be used in order to begin the predicate, with the negative marker -ki used to end the sentence.

Labu has three different forms of this negative marker, which are:

- naki
- ŋaki
- ki

The negative marker of -ki is derived from a verb stem, which explains why it uses the third person prefixes na- and ŋa-, which only otherwise attach to verbs. Despite deriving from a verb stem, because ki cannot stand alone within a verb phrase (VP), it cannot be classified as a verb.

The three forms of the negative marker, depending on the prefixes attached, are used in varying circumstances, dependent on the tense and mood of the utterance.

==== Naki ====
Naki is the negative marker used with the irrealis mood, specifically dubitative and imperative sentences. Examples of each are as follows (Siegel, 1984, p. 111-112):

yê	mba	nu-kusu	naki
you	POT	2S.IR-spit	IR.NEG
Don't spit.

pita	wa	ŋgwa	na-sê	gwà	naki
Peter	DUB	FUT	3S.IR-go.up	canoe	IR.NEG
Peter might not get on the canoe.

==== ŋaki ====
The negative marker ŋaki is used in the realis mood, when declaring a statement of fact, as long as it is not past tense. This means that it is used for present and habitual events. An example of this marker in use can be seen in the following sentence (Siegel, 1984, p. 111):

ai	mbi	ndu-dumala	kô	gwà	ŋaki
I	POT	1S.NR-look	at	canoe	NR.NEG
I'm not looking at the canoe OR I don't see the canoe.

==== Ki ====
Ki is used to mark negation in sentences that utilise the past tense, meaning that it is used for events that have already occurred. An example is (Siegel, 1984, p. 111-112):

ai	mba	yô-nô	ni	ki
I	POT	1S.OT-drink	coconut	NEG
I didn't drink the coconut.

==== Negative verbs ====
As well as the use of the negative marker -ki in its various forms, Labu also has verbs which are inherently negative. These are the verbs -le to not want, or -ya pale to not know. As with other verbs within Labu, prefixes are added to the verb to signal number and tense. Examples are as follows (Siegel, 1984, p. 122):

ai	yêgi	palê	mba	ŋgwa	nda-di	pô
I	1S.PT.hit	not.know	SUB	FUT	1S.IR-swim	water
I don't know if I'll go swimming.

ai	ya-le	mba	ndêna	ê
I	1S.PT-not.want	SUB	1S.IR.eat	fish
I don't want to eat fish.
