= Watut language =

Austronesian language

Watut
- Native to: Papua New Guinea
- Region: Watut River region
- Native speakers: (3,200 cited 1988–2012)
- Language family: Austronesian: Malayo-Polynesian; Oceanic; Western Oceanic; North New Guinea ?; Ngero–Vitiaz ?; Huon Gulf; Markham; Watut

Language codes
- ISO 639-3: Variously: una – North Watut mpl – Middle Watut mcy – South Watut
- Glottolog: watu1246

Watut is a language complex of Austronesian languages spoken in northern Papua New Guinea. Dialects include Maralinan, Silisili, Unank, Maralangko, and Danggal. It is spoken in Watut Rural LLG of Morobe Province.

== Varieties ==
Watut varieties and their respective locations are:

- South Watut
  - South Watut, dialect 1: Danggal, Wawas (6.964888°S 146.373114°E), and Kumwats villages
  - South Watut, dialect 2: Maraianglro (6.968605°S 146.375509°E) and Dzenemp (6.964491°S 146.375677°E) villages
- Middle Watut: Babwaf (6.88249°S 146.399126°E), Mararena (6.882399°S 146.400017°E), and Bentseng (Tshetsie) (6.856273°S 146.355971°E) villages
- North Watut: Vruf (6.779356°S 146.387941°E), Mahanadzo (6.746839°S 146.416959°E), Morom (6.772604°S 146.302126°E), and Wampan villages.

Middle Watut, also called Middle Kodut, is spoken by 1,700 people in the Mumeng district, lower Watut valley, Babuaf (Madzim and Singono), Bencheng, Dungutung, and Marauna villages. There are four dialects: Borar, Babuaf, Tsangg (Changg), Zowents (Jowench). The ISO code is mpl.
