= Busu River =

River in Papua New Guinea

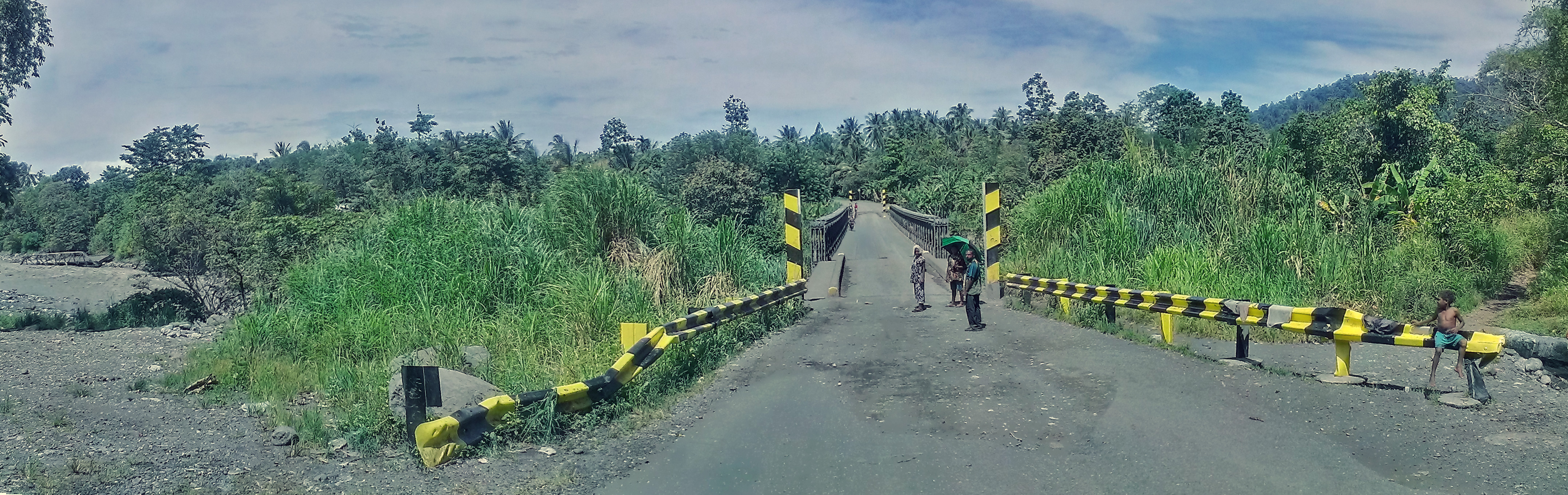
- Bridge over the Busu

Location
- Country: Papua New Guinea
- Region: Morobe Province

Physical characteristics
- Source
  - location: Saruwaged Range, Papua New Guinea
  - coordinates: 6°19′00″S 147°05′11″E
  - elevation: 2,270 m (7,450 ft)
- Mouth: Huon Gulf
  - coordinates: 6°43′44″S 147°03′05″E
  - elevation: 0 m (0 ft)
- Length: 75 km (47 mi)
- Basin size: 1,311.32 km^{2} (506.30 sq mi)
- Discharge
  - location: Near mouth
  - average: 50.02 m^{3}/s (1,766 cu ft/s)

The Busu River is a river located near Wagang, Lae in Morobe Province of Papua New Guinea. It is the fastest-flowing river in Papua New Guinea and the sixth-fastest in the world.
