= Nabak language =

Papuan language

Nabak
- Native to: Papua New Guinea
- Region: Huon Peninsula, Morobe Province
- Native speakers: (16,000 cited 1994)
- Language family: Trans–New Guinea: Finisterre–Huon; Huon; Western Huon; Nabak

Language codes
- ISO 639-3: naf
- Glottolog: naba1256

Nabak (also known as Wain) is a Papuan language spoken by around 16,000 people in the Morobe Province located in the western Huon Peninsula of Papua New Guinea. Nabak follows the SOV typology. It uses Latin script in its written form.

== Classification and language status ==
Nabak is sub-grouped into the Trans-New Guinea, Finisterre-Huon, Western, Huon language family. The Expanded Graded Intergenerational Disruption Scale (EGDIS) has the Nabak level 5. A level 5 language is considered as “developing”, meaning that Nabak is thriving but a standardized form is not widespread. Level 1 speakers, or native speakers, on average are about 50 to 75 percent fluent in Nabak. The language is spread throughout approximately 30 settlements, totaling 52 villages in the Busu river east headwaters.

== Phonology ==
=== Consonants ===
	Labial	Alveolar	Palatal	Labiovelar	Velar
Stops	p b	t d		kʷ ɡʷ	k ɡ
Nasals	m	n			ŋ
Fricatives		s z			
Lateral		ǀ			
Glide			j	w	

Allophones of /kʷ, ɡʷ/ can be heard as [k͡p, ɡ͡b]. Allophones of sounds /s, z, l, w/ can be heard as [t͡s, d͡z, ɾ, β].

=== Vowels ===
	Front	Central	Back
High	i		u
Mid	e		o
Low		a	ɒ

Written form: â, a, e, i, o, u

== Words ==
=== Nouns ===
Nouns can be pluralized and/or possessed. If a noun is pluralized, then the possessive noun indicator must also be present. Nouns that are body-parts are typically in the possessive form, unless making an objective statement.

==== Examples ====
- bet = a hand
- bedi = your hand
- zikat = an eye
- zikalidne = their (dual) eyes
- kwaŋ = grass
- kwaŋaŋ = his grass
- tunne = my rivers

==== The structure of nouns ====
Stem	(optional) possessive	(optional -ne PL

==== Possessive suffixes ====
	Singular	Dual	Plural
First	-n ~ -m ~ -ŋ	-nit ~ -it	-n ~ -m ~ -ŋ
Second	ndi ~ di	-ŋit ~ -it	-ŋin ~ -in
Third	ŋaŋ ~ -maŋ ~ -naŋ	-ŋit ~ -it	-ŋin ~ -in

=== Pronouns ===
There are many pronouns in the Nabak language. Formal genitive pronouns are not as widespread there is no direct translation to English third-person pronouns. Formal genitive pronouns only exists in the interrogative form.

==== First person pronouns ====
	Singular	Dual	Plural
Subject/Object	neŋ	nit	nin
Emphatic	nen	nilit	nin
Refelxive	nenak	ndak	nnak
Genitive	nâgât	nigat	niŋalen
Benefactive	nenaŋgalen	ndaŋgalen	nnaŋgalen
Emphatic Genitive	neŋo	nilo/nitlo	nino
Associative	nemak	nibmak	nimak
Comitative	neŋmak	nitmak	ninmak

=== Adjectives ===
Adjectives and nouns are part of the same word class in the Nabak Language. This category only serves to illustrate nouns that can modify a head noun. Though, a dilemma occurs because these modifier nouns can also act as the head nouns that they are modifying. It is important to identify when describing ‘adjectives’ in Nabak, what is being described are words that are part of the noun class.

==== Examples ====
Quality:

- dolak-ŋaŋ = good
- sambubu-ŋaŋ = rotten

Size:

- tembe = big
- isik-ŋaŋ = little

Dimensions:

- teep-maŋ = tall/long
- Da-naŋ = short

Color

- ŋa-maŋ = red
- sat-naŋ = white

Weight

- nuk-ŋaŋ = heavy
- Imbela-ŋaŋ = light

==== Numbers ====
1. kwep = one
2. zut = two
3. tuk = three

(*Note that phrases represent higher numbers*)

=== Verbs ===
Verbs consists of an optional prefix, with a verb stem, then with an optional first-order aspect suffix.

There are medial verbs and final verbs. Final verbs are located at the end of a sentence. Medial verbs can be located anywhere but at the end of a sentence.

==== Structure of medial and final verbs ====
Aspect	Stem	Aspect
tat-SCON	instransitive stem	-maCONT
ma-CONT	transitive stem	neDUR

=== Interrogatives ===
Polar interrogatives are made from declarative statements simply by changing the vocal intonation so that there is a higher pitch at the end of a sentence.

Non-polar interrogatives are made by using the words equivalent to “who”, “what”, “when”, “where”, etc.

kuleki, kwileki		what?
kulekiet	kuleki-yet	why?
kwiaŋ	kwi-aŋ	who?
kwi		whom?
kwialen	kwi-yet-en	whose?
de		where?
den	de-en	where?
denen	de-en-en	to where?
desedgadnaŋ	de-set-gat-naŋ	from where?
deset	de-set	which way?
deyet	de-yet	which?
zugŋan	zuk-ŋan	when?
ziboŋ	zi-boŋ	like which?
zigok	zi-gok	how?

==== Emotion and interrogatives ====
Interrogatives can also be used to introduce emotion into a story. This is done by the storyteller making the participant in a story ask a question to themselves, letting the listeners of the story what emotion they are dealing with.
