= Taraka, Papua New Guinea =

Taraka
- Suburb
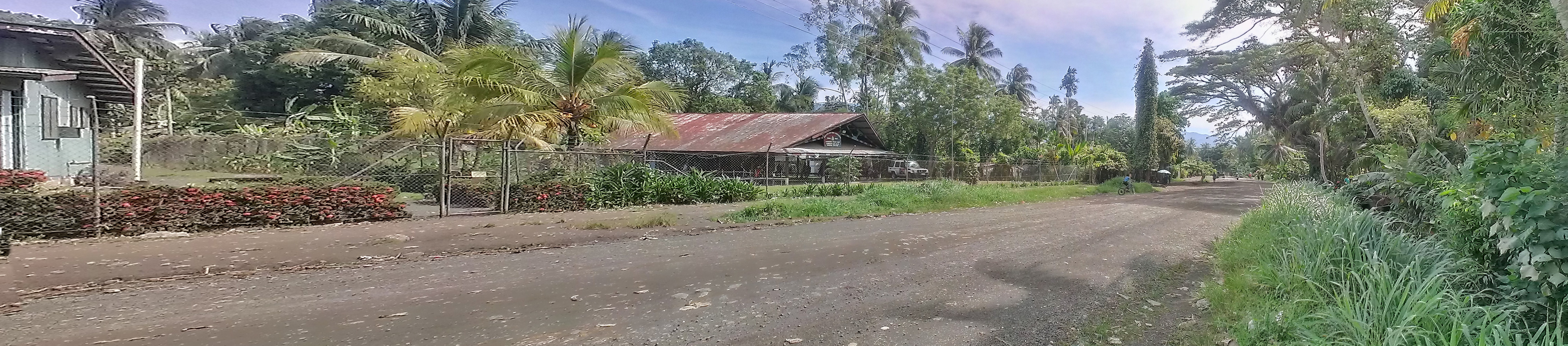
- Rigel Road, West Taraka. Police post in center of photo

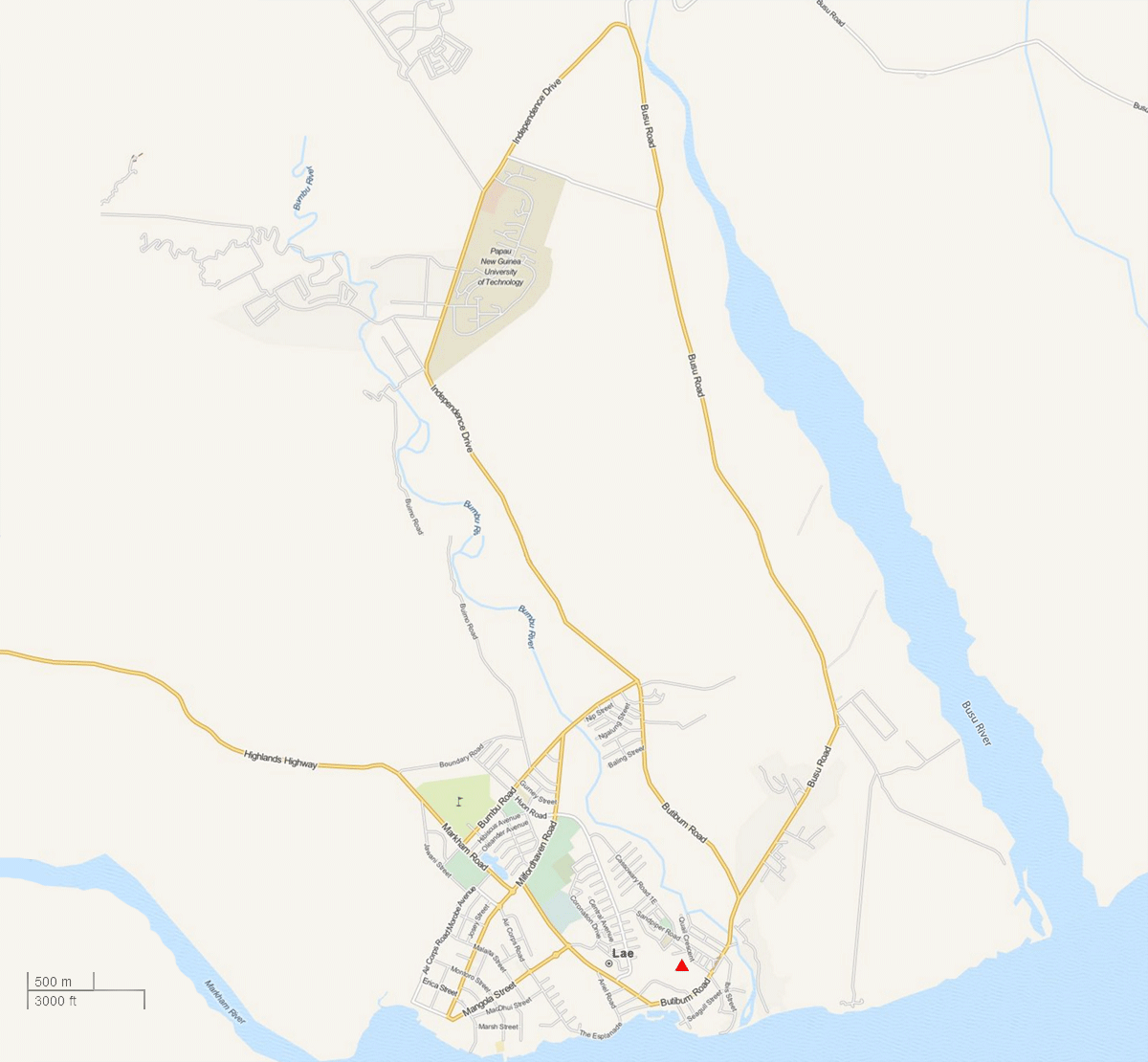
- Location in Lae
- Coordinates: 6°39′40″S 146°57′11″E
- Country: Papua New Guinea
- Province: Morobe Province
- District: Lae District
- Time zone: UTC+10 (AEST)

Taraka is a suburb of Lae in the Morobe Province, Papua New Guinea. The main campus for the Papua New Guinea University of Technology is located in Taraka.

== Location ==
Both East Taraka and West Taraka are located 7 km from Lae on Rigel Road. A tributary for the Bumbu River meanders through Taraka. East Taraka is predominately commercial and industrial while West Taraka is mostly residential.

== Population ==
In 1963 it was estimated that 10% of Lae's population lived in "Shanty-town settlements which describe both Omili and Taraka and there is evidence that these settlements have grown well above the average rate of Lae.

== Housing ==
In May 1992, another study examined migrant settlement in and around Lae examining Tent Siti and West Taraka.

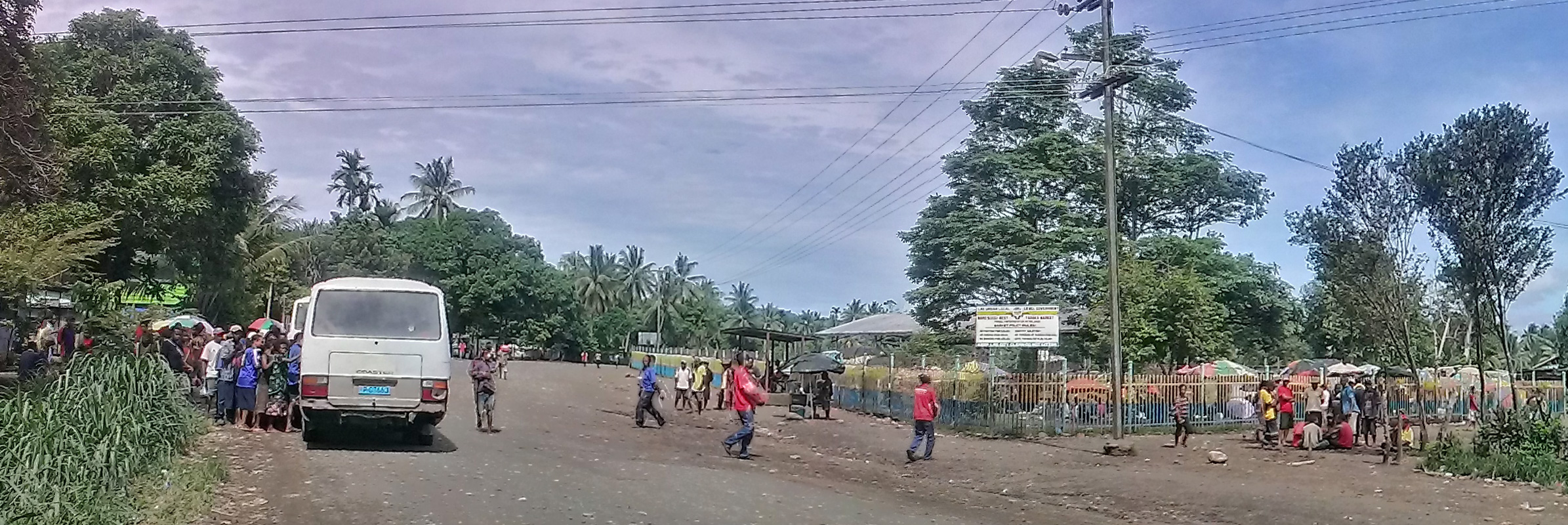
West Taraka community market

Tent Siti
Tensiti is situated in the northern part of the city and was first formed by people from Menyamya, Morobe Province in 1983. Now this settlement is composed of 30 households from Menyamya, 17 households from the Highlands areas, and 11 households form the Sepik areas. People live on government land and many of them work as wage earners. Examples of their occupations include a provincial officer, an employee of a private company, and a teacher. In addition, some of them are farmers in the city.

West Taraka
West Taraka is situated in the north-western part of the city, and Boundary Road is situated in the mid-western part of the city. Both grew rapidly in the 1970s and 1980s because of migration from the Highlands areas.

The study found that almost half of the informants (48.5%) came to Lae in the 1980s. The figure is much higher in Mouth Markham (66.7%). East Sepik Province (30.3%) and the provinces in the Highlands (30.3%) stand out as places where the informants lived before they came to Lae. This tendency corresponds to the fact that most respondents were born in the Sepik and Highlands areas and less than half of them have had former migration experiences.

The people from East Sepik tend to live in Mouth Markham, and those from the Highlands tend to concentrate in the West Taraka and Boundary Road settlements respectively. 57.6 percent of respondents came to Lae for employment. However, it is also true that their relatives (60.6%), were staying in Lae before the respondents moved to Lae.

In May 1993, a study focused on the West Taraka Housing scheme and found that tenants were significantly dissatisfied with their houses. Aspects of dissatisfaction referred to the size of houses, number of rooms and living/dining areas, lack of storage space, and poorly laid out and badly designed kitchen, toilet, and bathroom facilities.

In 2011 another study on housing was conducted drawing on the 1973 - 1974 urban household survey which revealed that less than 40% of the urban households had built and owned the houses they lived in. Five years after the establishment of the National Housing Corporation (NHC), another urban household survey revealed that only 10% of all houses in Lae were either rented or leased directly and the corresponding figure for Port Moresby was 23%.

Another study by the Bank of Papua New Guinea examined the demand for urban housing finance which found that two factors discouraged individual investment in urban home-ownership in Papua New Guinea. Firstly the rental housing market in Papua New Guinea was, and still is, heavily subsidised by the government and associated with paying rates, taxes and other regular repair and maintenance costs. Secondly most Papua New Guineans held strong ties with their rural areas and many people were unprepared to sever these ties for several reasons, for instance, fear of being accused by wantoks (relatives and friends) of running away from rural obligations.

Public housing in Papua New Guinea is not only unavailable, but also unattainable for a large proportion (60.0%) of the urban population. It is evident that even the 1981 housing policy that encouraged national home-ownership schemes has not significantly increased home-ownership.

In 2013 tenants in East Taraka were given notices for outstanding arrears as per their requirement to pay the National Housing Corporation.

== Community Donations ==
In 2009 the Digicel foundation donated a Community Learning Centre for the West Taraka Dunda elementary school. One year earlier the school, which was built by the community, was destroyed by fire. There are over 200 children at the school which was established by the Dunda family in 1999.

In 2013 the Rotary Club of Lae Huon Gulf deliver much needed school desks and chairs to Gantom School at East Taraka. The school has 1,020 pupils and included was 100 school desks, 250 chairs, 2 teacher's desks, many library books and a generous quantity of sporting equipment.

== Industry ==
East Taraka is home to many large and medium businesses. Between 1950 and 1960 peanut production was at an all-time high for the Markham Valley with K600,000 worth of exports to Australia. In response, Sanitarium established a peanut butter factory in Taraka. By 1974 there were zero exports.

== 2003 Riot ==
On 3 February 2003, ethnic riots broke out at west Taraka between Western Highlander and Memyamya tribes. As a result, police from West Taraka were attacked trying to quell the violence.

A Man was shot dead, two auxiliary policemen injured and more than a K1 million worth of property was destroyed during an ethnic clash yesterday in Lae city. About 20 PMV buses, eight private vehicles, three trade stores and 12 houses belonging to the Western Highlands people were destroyed by the Menyamya people at West Taraka yesterday morning.The fight erupted from an incident on Sunday after some drunken men from Tambul District of Western Highlands threw sugar cane husk at a Menyamya man who was selling his produce at West Taraka market. The Menyamya man threw the husk back at the Western Highlanders. It landed on the face of one of them. The Western Highlander retaliated by stoning the Menyamyan on the head. The Menyamyan later mobilised his tribesmen and they attack the Western Highlanders. Two of my policemen were injured after I sent them to investigate and to stop the fight this morning, Mr Wambe said. The incident developed into a full-scale war later in the day, resulting in the death of the man. Menyamyans living in other parts of Lae city converged on West Taraka

In response, the Royal Papua New Guinea Constabulary closed the police station for ten years until November 2013;

After more than ten years the Police station responsible for enforcing law and order in West Taraka has been reopened. In recent times, the influx of people has caused problems for the Police service that are to this date still outnumbered by growing population in the city. In the past one thousand people became hostile toward the police.
