= Markham Valley =

Valley in Papua New Guinea

Coordinates: 6°44′20″S 146°58′05″E

The Markham Valley is a geographical area in Papua New Guinea. The name "Markham" commemorates Sir Clements Markham, Secretary of the British Royal Geographical Society - Captain John Moresby of the Royal Navy named the Markham River after Sir Clements in the course of his voyage of exploration in HMS Basilisk in 1873. The valley contains two districts of Morobe Province: Huon Gulf district on the east and Markham district on the west. The inhabitants of the valley are of Oceanic (Austronesian) descent and live in large villages under a chieftain political system.

The valley is described as "Flatter than a pancake for miles and miles in all directions, until it runs into the mountains that surround it on three sides" and "always hot, and usually bone dry". The Highlands Highway runs through the valley. The Markham River runs through the valley. According to one visitor, about once a year, the local Papua New Guineans burn the dry grass.

The Markham Valley runs from the port city of Lae up to the junction of the Highlands Highway and the road to Madang. The Markham Valley is approximately 160 km (99 mi) long and gains approximately 500 m (1,600 ft) in elevation. The dominant land use in the valley is as cattle pasture, with some sugar-cane production and chicken farming.

In 1993, the valley was devastated by landslides and breached landslide dams caused by a series of earthquakes with the largest measuring 6.9 on the moment magnitude scale. Sixty people lost their lives in the disaster.

== See also ==
- Markham languages
- Wampar Rural LLG
