= Dowsett =

Dowsett may refer to:

- Alex Dowsett (born 1988), English professional cyclist, currently riding for Movistar Team
- Charles Dowsett (1924–1998), Professor of Armenian at Oxford University
- Craig Dowsett (born 1960), Australian rules footballer
- Dickie Dowsett (1931–2020), English professional footballer
- J. Morewood Dowsett (1864–1955), English big-game hunter, naturalist and writer
- John Dowsett, Australian judge
- Michael Dowsett (born 1992), Australian rugby union player
- Phil Dowsett (born 1951), British racing driver
- Wilhelmine Kekelaokalaninui Widemann Dowsett (1861–1929), Native Hawaiian suffragist

== See also ==
- Dowsett, Papua New Guinea, suburb of Lae
