= Mount Shungol =

Mountain in Papua New Guinea

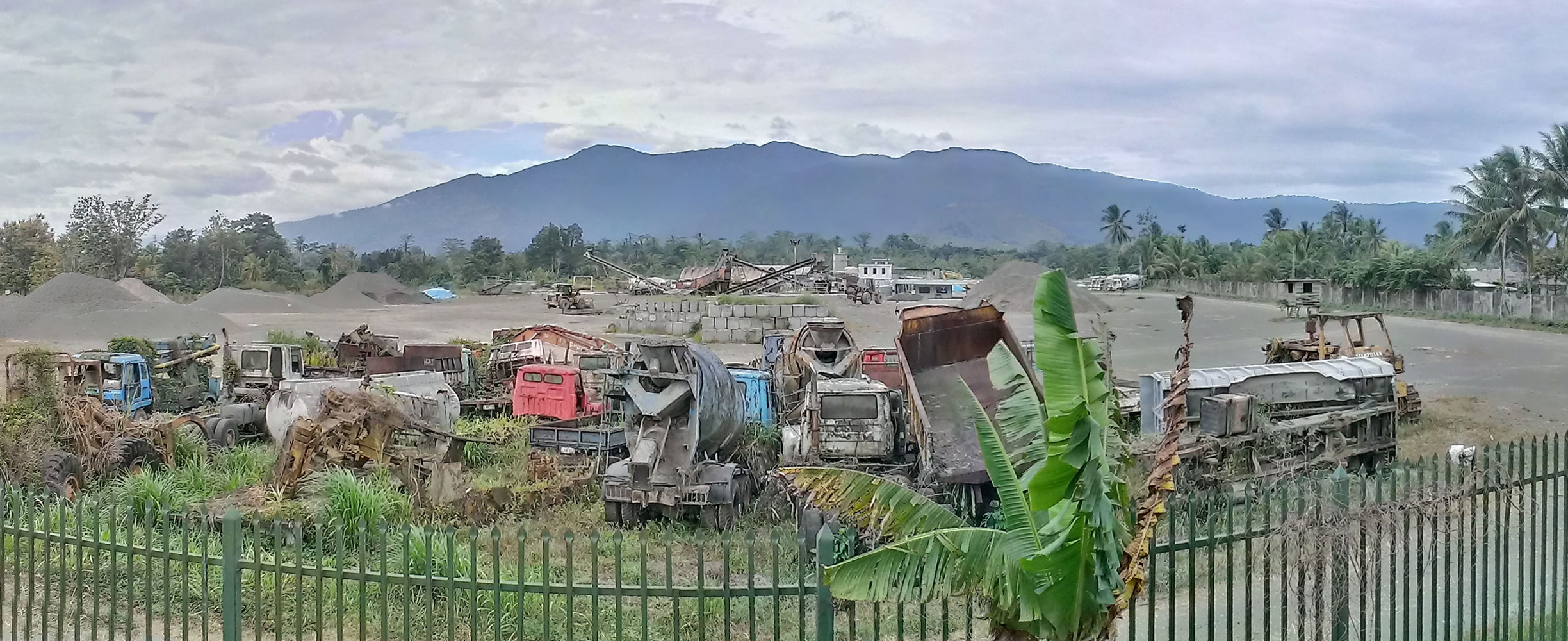
- Photograph taken from Lae, facing Mount Shungol from 9 Mile weighbridge

Highest point
- Elevation: 2,752 m (9,029 ft)
- Prominence: 1,518 m (4,980 ft)
- Listing: Ultra, Ribu
- Coordinates: 6°51′48″S 146°42′57″E

Geography
- Location within Papua New Guinea
- Location: Near Lae, Morobe Province, Papua New Guinea
- Parent range: Herzog Mountains

Mount Shungol (also known as Mount Chungol) is an ultra-prominent summit (ranked number 31) to the west of Lae, in Morobe Province, Papua New Guinea. It is in the Herzog Mountain Range and has an elevation of 2,752 metres (9,029 ft). The Buang people claim ownership to the top of Mount Shungol.

== Locale ==
Dambi Peak 2,250 feet (690 m) is located to the South West, Snake River along the South East base, Aria and Tuoima Creeks to the North West and Wampit River to the West. Omalia and Bupa Missions are West of Mount Shungol while Wago Mission is to the East.

== Endemic fauna ==
=== Albericus frog ===
A new species of Albericus from Mt. Shungol has been discovered and inhabits lowland hill forest from the slopes of Mt. Shungol. Albericus is a genus of microhylid frogs endemic to New Guinea. These are small frogs with maximum body length around 27 mm. The genus name Albericus is the Latin form of Alberich, shape-shifting dwarf in the epic poem Nibelungenlied.

=== Cophixalus frog ===
The Cophixalus albolineatus whose habitat is the northwestern slope of Mount Shungol. Cophixalus (rainforest frogs or nursery frogs) is a genus of microhylid frogs. These are arboreal species with expanded toe-pads, endemic to Moluccan Islands, New Guinea and northeastern Queensland, Australia.

=== Citrogramma ===
Citrogramma is a genus of hoverfly of the insect family Syrphidae whose habitat is on Mount Shungol.

=== Solanum ===
Solanum is a large and diverse genus of flowering plants, including two food crops of the highest economic importance, the potato and the tomato. Hartleya Sleum (Stemonur.) is only known from Mount Shungol.

=== Birds-of-Paradise ===
Many species of Birds-of-Paradise are endemic to the area. Among these is the brown sicklebill. The brown sicklebill (Epimachus meyeri) is a dark blue and green bird-of-paradise with highly iridescent plumages, a sickle-shaped bill, pale blue iris and brown underparts. Mount Shungol and Mount Missim (above the towns of Wau and Bulolo) comprise a centre of endemism for many bird subspecies.

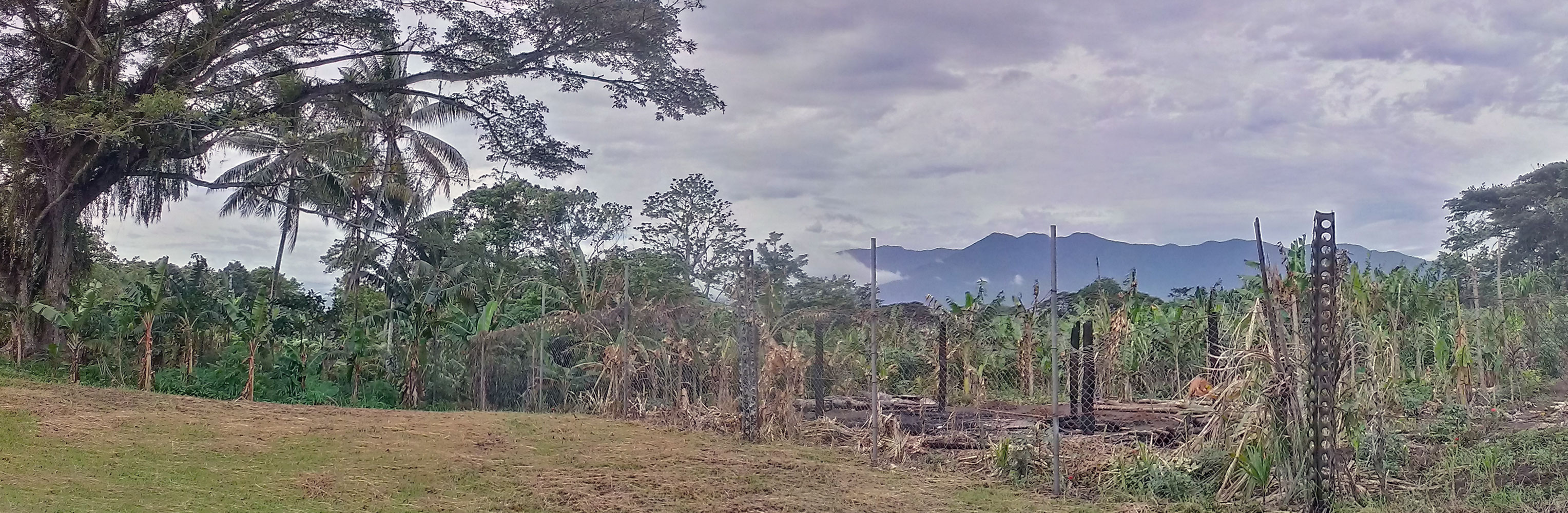
Mount Shungol in the background, taken from 3 Mile, Lae

== See also ==
- List of Ultras of Oceania
