= Merire =

Papua New Guinean police officer

Police Sergeant Major Merire BEM from Gomema village, Waria, Morobe Patrol Post, Lae was a member of the Royal Papuan and New Guinea Constabulary who joined the police force in 1936. On the occasion of the Japanese landings at Madang in 1942, he was able to move all the residents with their supplies into the forest to avoid capture. His subsequent observations as far along the coast as Finschhafen served to guide U.S. bombing raids on Japanese positions.

Merire was captured on several occasions, but still always managed to escape with new information. When Australian troops initiated a recapture of the island, his service as a guide was invaluable. For his efforts he was awarded the British Empire Medal, and in 1952 was featured on a stamp of Papua New Guinea.
