= Voco Point =

- Suburb
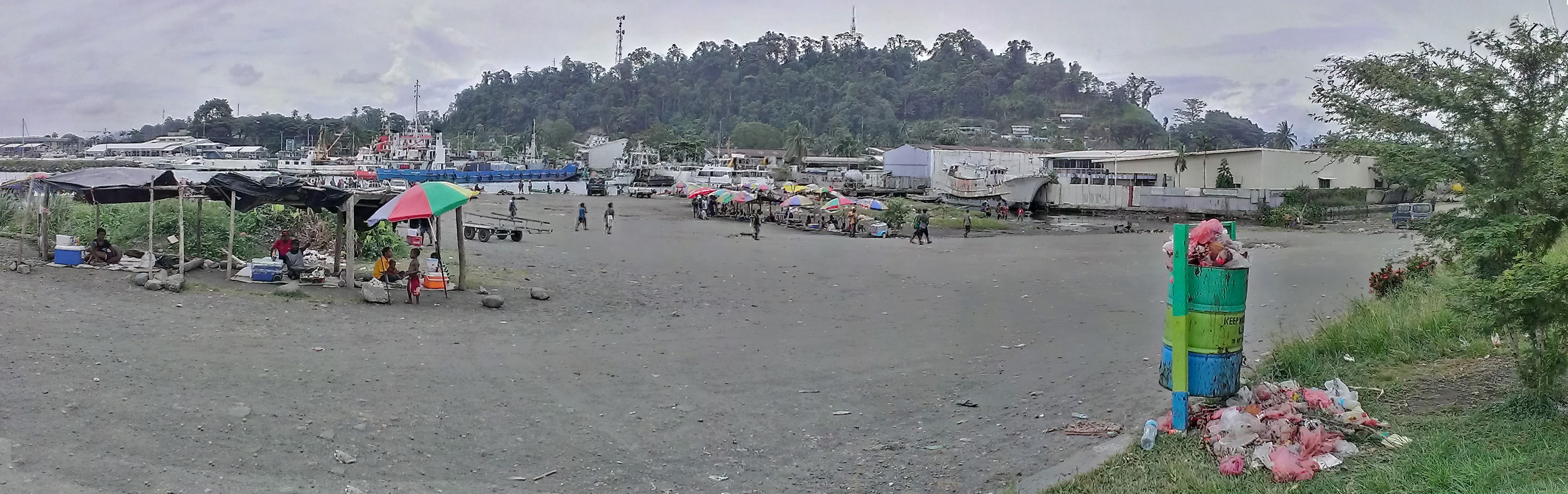
- Panoramic photo of Voco Point Lae facing north, yacht club, Mount Lunaman and Lutheran Shipping in center of photo

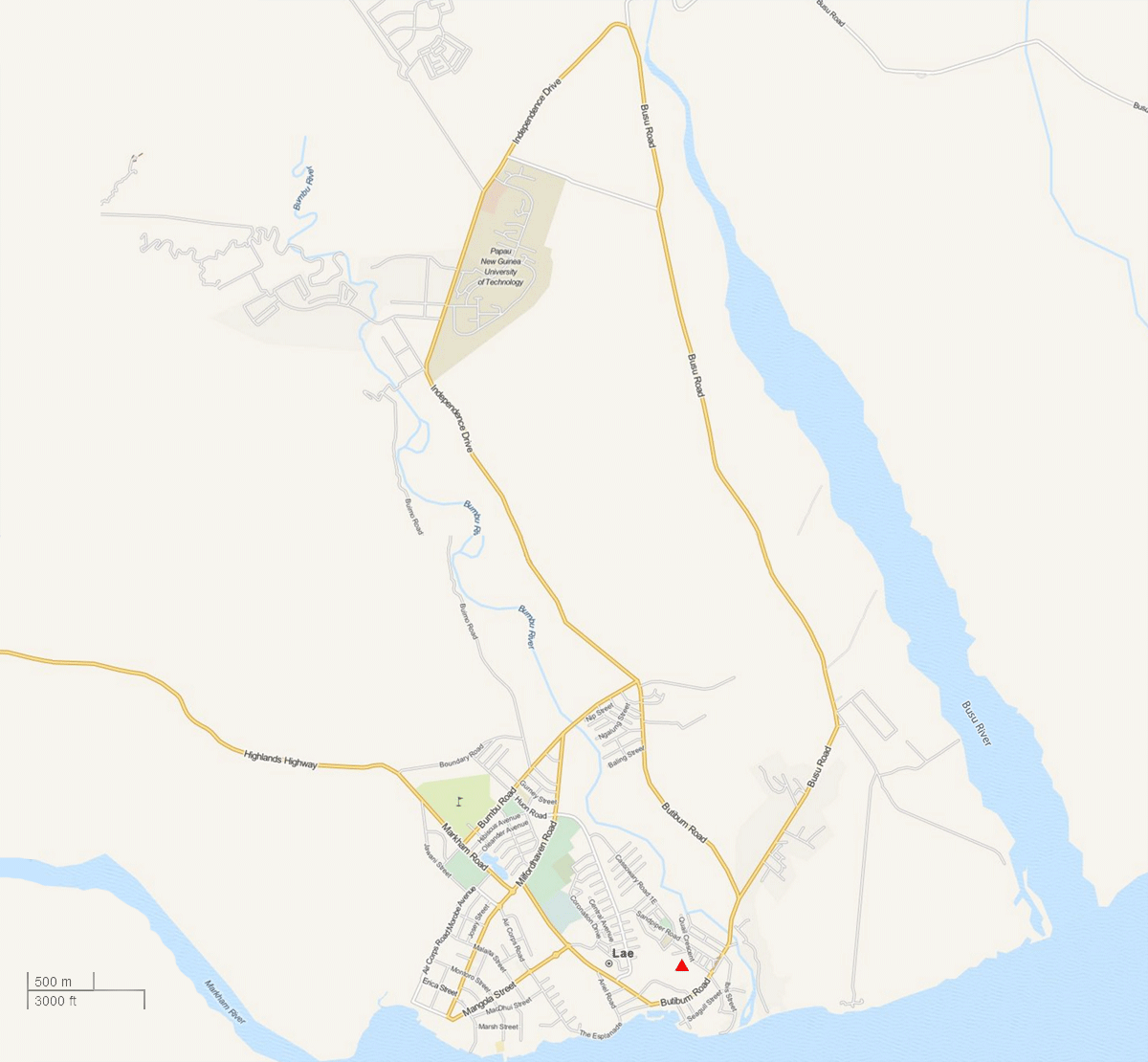
- Location in Lae
- Coordinates: 6°44′20″S 147°0′11″E
- Country: Papua New Guinea
- Province: Morobe
- District: Lae
- Time zone: UTC+10 (AEST)

Voco Point is a suburb of Lae in the Morobe Province, Papua New Guinea. Voco Point is one of the busiest coastal trading points in the country and coastal vessels from throughout the country, from Alotau to Manus, from Lihir to Vanimo line up at the wharves. The passenger boats ferry people to Finschhafen, the Siassi islands, Kimbe, Rabaul, New Ireland, Oro Bay, Alotau, Madang, and Wewak. The local Lae villages call the area around Voco Point Asiawi, which according to mythology, used to be a long point that went out much further but was eaten by the evil spirit Yaayaa.

== Location ==
Voco Point is located 1 km east of the main port of Lae and south of the main town on the coast.

== Nomenclature ==
The pre-World War I Vacuum Oil Company, later called Mobil, (Note: Mobil Oil Australia was established in Australia in 1895 and traded as Vacuum Oil Company. It was the first oil company to operate in Australia, New Guinea, and Lae.) had a depot at the site of Voco Point. Voco is short for Vacuum Oil Company.

== History ==
The main township of Lae was originally on the flats between Voco Point and the airfield. The site was later shifted to the terraces above where the elite had lived in the days before the war.

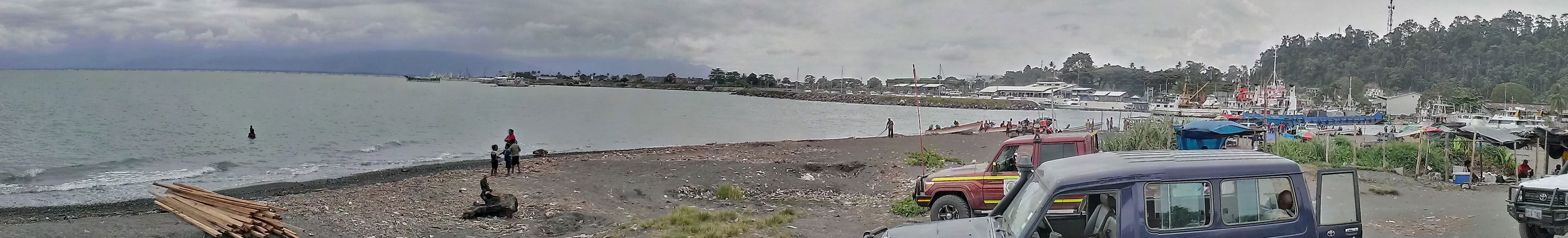
Panoramic photo of Voco Point Lae facing west, yacht club and Lutheran Shipping in center of photo, Mount Lunaman to the right

During colonial times, local Chinese trading stores dominated the area. The Chinese had been brought to Lae and Rabaul by German colonials, for their boat building and carpentry skills.

=== World War II ===
During the Japanese occupation of Lae, barges from Voco Point would unload to resupply Japanese submarines from Rabaul. Barges included the LSTs MK3 of the RAN.

On 18 March, two spotters from the 23rd Heavy Wireless Section watched 12 barges emerge from their Labu swamp hideout to Voco Point to meet a submarine, which was then bombed by the USAAF. The Commander of the submarine, Captain Yahachi Tanabe, was killed.

Macarthur's Communique in newspapers reported: "LAE: Allied planes bombed Voco Point, drove off 9 Zeros".

Lyndon B. Johnson was appointed Lieutenant Commander in the United States Naval Reserve on 21 June 1940. Eleven B-26 Marauders of the 22nd Bomb Group departed Townsville on 8 June 1942, arrived in Port Moresby and raided Lae on 9 June 1942. The mission was called "TOW 9" and Lieutenant Commander Johnson, the future 36th President of the United States, went on this raid as an observer on the aircraft, the Heckling Hare. (Note: The aircraft the Heckling Hare (#40-1488) was probably named after the cartoon The Heckling Hare.) (Note: The aircraft was also known as the Arkansas Traveller.) Nine days after the raid, Johnson was awarded a Silver Star medal for his participation in the above bombing raid.

After Lae was liberated from Japanese occupation, 7th Division's Brigadier Eather set off by jeep to replace the Japanese flag on Mount Lunaman with the Australian flag.

During the late 1920s, many of the original inhabitants of Voco Point were employed by Australian airlines and traders. Their homes were moved to the 'roun wara' R2 area (now Eriku).

== Mount Lunaman ==
Mount Lunaman is 96 meters high and has a radio tower at the highest point marked by red fixed obstruction lights to assist navigation. At the base of Mount Lunaman at the southern and south-eastern face are the suburbs of Voco Point and Chinatown. The terraces are located to the west of Mount Lunaman.

Mount Lunaman is known to the locals as Lo' Wamung, or Locwamu which means "first hill", Hospital Hill and Fortress Hill by the German settlers.

Mount Lunaman and the Lae urban area have been the subject of several tectonic studies relating to plate shift.

Voco Point suffers from undersea landslides, because of the very steep shelf, and portions are lost about every 50 years. The last event was in the mid-1950s, when a wading pool in Stewart Park disappeared into the sea. The Rotary Club then re-built the wading pool in the Botanical Gardens. Local clan lore has more fanciful explanations of these losses.

=== Mount Lunaman during World War II ===
Mount Lunaman was an important landmark for both Japanese and the Allies:

"The men of the South Australian battalion hammered and sawed vigorously at the top of the terrace. They were reconstructing, with captured Japanese tools, the skeleton of the cottage formerly used as the Japanese commander's sanctum. A hole beneath the door led by a tunnel to a labyrinth of passages and apertures which honeycombed Mount Lunaman."

In a 1970 TV interview (JNTV) a Japanese general commanding Lae stated that the tunnels were used to house aircraft munitions and Avgas and were within 200m of the nearby airfield. In the same interview the general stated the Japanese utilized the Lutheran hospital at Malahang.

Unconfirmed reports state that Mount Lunaman contained the remains of many Japanese soldiers who defended Lae using tunnels:

A Japanese tomb believed to contain bodies of hundreds of Lae defenders was bought by two South Australian men for 1 pound. The tomb lies under Mount Lunaman, which is said to house a hospital and when the Japanese in tunnels refused to surrender to the Australian 7th Division and 9th Division troops in 1943 all entrances were sealed.

=== Australian Women's Army Service barracks ===
The 68th Australian Women's Army Service barracks was located on Butibum Road at the base of Mount Lunaman near the present location of Sir Ignatius Kilage Stadium. (Note: Location assumed from photographic analysis/ See external links.) The barracks were constructed by army engineers and New Guinean workers and the compound perimeter was enclosed by a high barbed wire fence patrolled by armed guards. Many women considered the high fences a symbol of constraint and the popular song "Don't Fence me In" was often sung.

One day after landing in Lae, news came through of the Allied Victory in Europe. A total of 385 AWAS in Lae served under the command of Lieutenant-Colonel Margaret Spencer. They served with First Army Headquarters and some supporting units, including in Ordnance and Signals.

=== Hotel Cecil ===
In March 1936, Mrs. Flora (Flo) Shaw Stewart (1886–1979) opened the Hotel Cecil at the base of Mount Lunaman at the location near the Sir Ignatius Kilage Stadium. In December 1941 Stewart was evacuated to Australia with her two daughters. She returned to Lae at the end of World War II where she took over the Australian Women's Army Service barracks and turned them into a temporary Hotel Cecil for the war-ravaged town. She remained an army nurse until 1948 following protracted battles with officials (Bret Bretag and other councillors) over licensing for the hotel. She finally rebuilt the hotel on its pre-war site in 1951 and operated it until 1957. Reported to cost over £100,000, the hotel took two and a half years to build and has 51 rooms and a dining room. The Hotel Cecil's Bamboo Bar was a very popular "watering hole" for many local identities of Lae and the district.

The new PNG mandate did not allow the sale of alcohol to PNG nationals. The cruise liners of the 1930s, which kept the original hotel in business, did not make a comeback, which left business quite slack. The Stewarts sold the hotel in 1958, and opened the Morobe Theatre in Second Street.

== Lae cemetery ==
Lae cemetery was on the original site at the foot of Mount Lunaman.

== Settlements ==
On 21 May 1991 the Voco Point settlement was evicted and the families were given little time to carry their belongings out of their houses. During this year the government and police also evicted two other settlements.

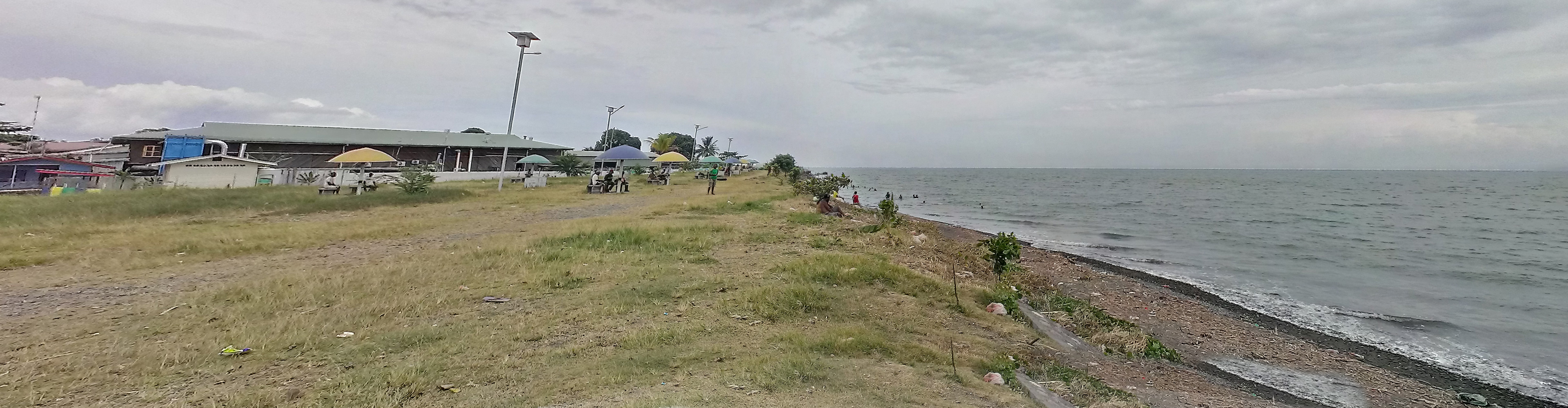
Panoramic photo of Voco Point Lae facing east

Traders from the Huon Peninsula and Siassi Islands have been subject to harassment and vandalism from the Bumbu settlers, forcing boat operators to moor at alternate locations. In response, businessman Hilmar Wong (Note: Hilmar Wong is a Lae businessman in construction, member of the Chamber of Commerce, active fisherman and long time resident of Lae.) has built a police station and a lockup at the troubled spot.

== Lutheran Shipping ==
Lutheran Shipping is located at Voco Point.

In 1908, Samuel Jericho, one of the few Australian Lutherans to join the mission before World War I, arrived to take charge of the boats. He sailed the first mission vessel, Bavaria, the early forerunner of the fleet of Lutheran Shipping New Guinea.

On 7 September 1991, 24 people were missing when MV Simbang capsized near Sialum. 83 people were on board.

In 2012 the National Maritime Safety Authority ordered the company to ground four of its eight vessels because they were not seaworthy.

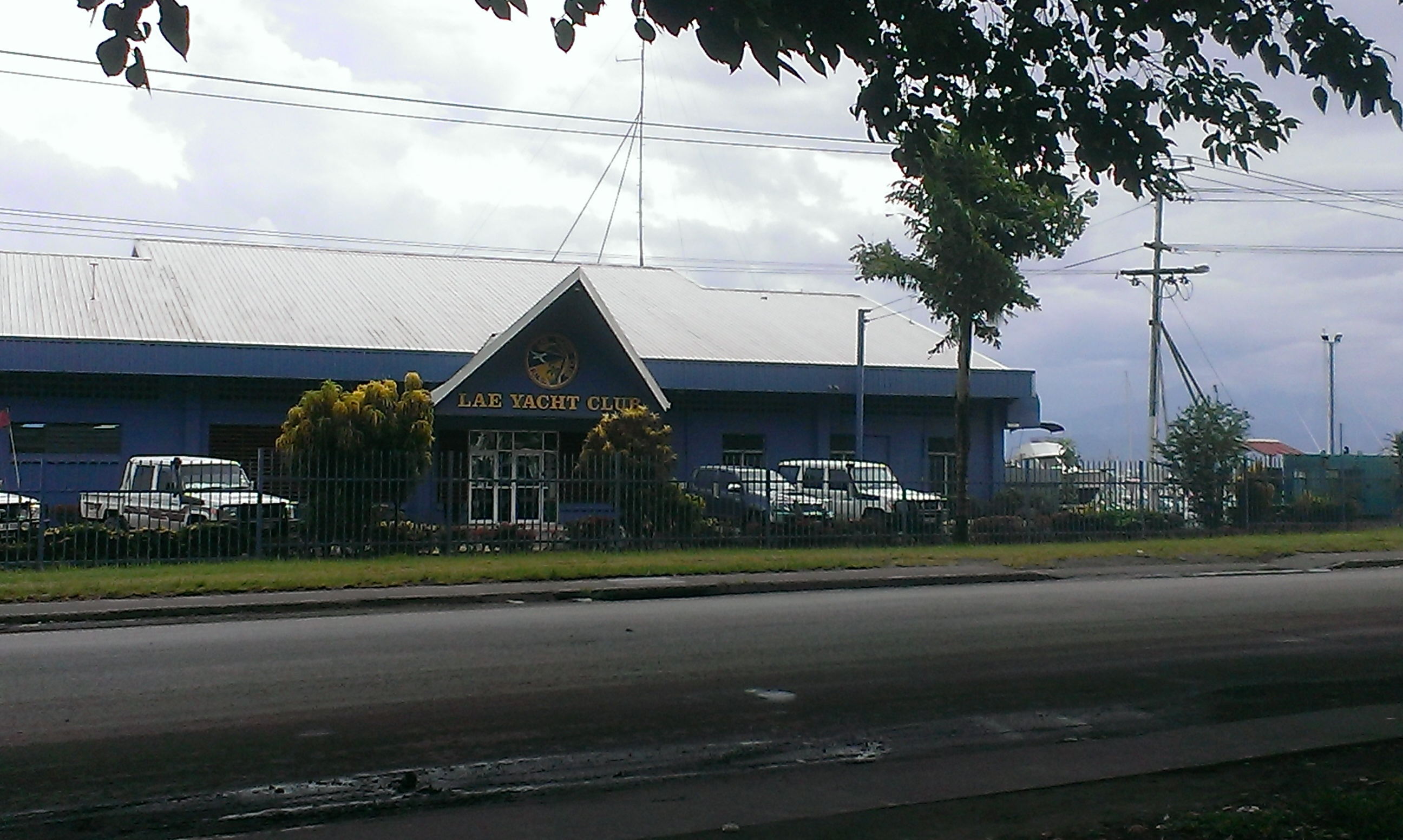
Lae Yacht Club

== Lae Yacht Club ==
The yacht club was established in 1950 by Bill Humphries and Bill Carr at Voco Point. Lae Yacht Club moved from Voco Point to the existing premises. On 15 March 2003 the new location was officially opened by the MP Bart Philemon and became the most prestigious yacht club in Papua New Guinea. As of 20 July 2012, membership records exceed 1100 Full Members, Social Members and Associates.
