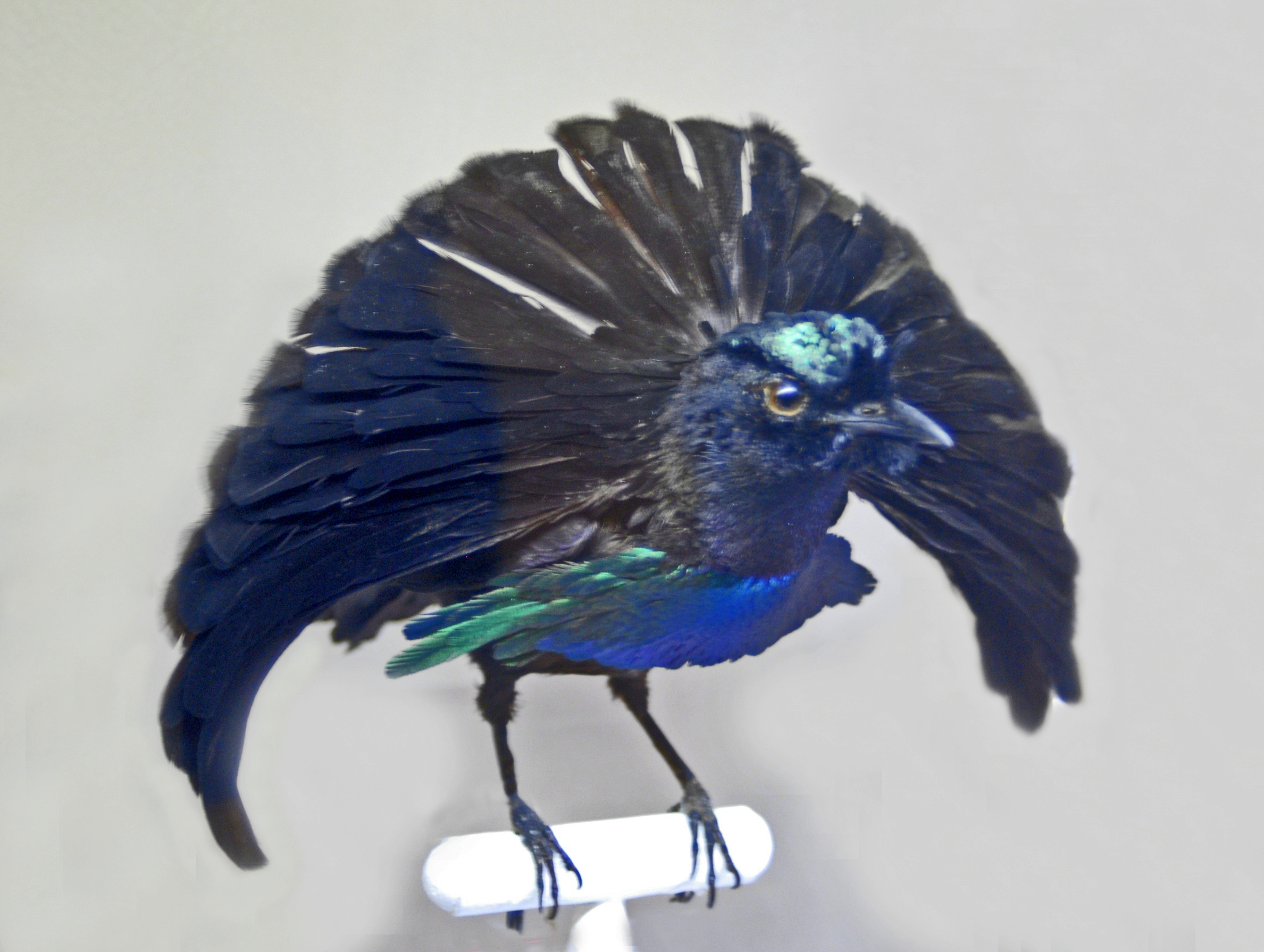
- Lophorina superba, male. Museum specimen

Conservation status
- Least Concern (IUCN 3.1)

Scientific classification
- Kingdom: Animalia
- Phylum: Chordata
- Class: Aves
- Order: Passeriformes
- Family: Paradisaeidae
- Genus: Lophorina
- Species: L. latipennis

Binomial name
- Lophorina latipennis Rothschild, 1907

= Greater lophorina =

Species of bird

The greater lophorina (Lophorina latipennis), formerly a subspecies of the superb bird-of-paradise, is a species of passerine bird in the bird-of-paradise family Paradisaeidae. It is found in the central and northeast montane regions of New Guinea.

== Taxonomy ==
The greater lophorina was formally described in 1907 by the English zoologist Walter Rothschild based on a specimen collected in the Rawlinson Mountains on the Huon Peninsula of north-eastern Papua New Guinea. He considered the specimen to be a subspecies of the lesser lophorina and coined the trinomial name Lophorina minor latipennis. The specific epithet combines the Latin latus meaning "broad" with -pennis meaning "-winged" or "-feathered".

For many years what is now the greater lophorina was treated as one of the subspecies of the superb bird-of-paradise with the trinomial (Lophorina superba latipennis). In 2017 Martin Irestedt and collaborators suggested that the superb bird-of-paradise should be split into three species. They also proposed a neotype from the Kobowre Mountains in New Guinea for the no longer extant type specimen for Lophorina superba. The original type specimen for superba had previously been assumed to come from the Bird's Head Peninsula. Although, the split was generally supported by other ornithologists, the designation of the neotype and the resulting assignment of subspecies were strongly disputed. The taxonomy adopted here rejects the designation of the neotype but splits the superb bird-of-paradise into three species.

Three subspecies are recognised:

- L. l. feminina Ogilvie-Grant, 1915 – west New Guinea, from the Kobowre Mountains (West Papua, Indonesia) to the Sepik-Strickland River Divide (west Papua New Guinea)
- L. l. addenda Iredale, 1948 – Yuat-Strickland Rivers Divide (central east New Guinea) to head of southeast New Guinea
- L. l. latipennis Rothschild, 1907 – montane Huon Peninsula Adelbert Range (?), and Herzog Mountains (northeast New Guinea)

== Description ==
It is a small, approximately 26 cm (about 10 inches) long, passerine bird. The greater lophorina is a dimorphic species. The male is black with an iridescent green crown, blue-green breast cover, and a long velvety black erectile cape covering his back. The female is a reddish-brown bird with brownish-barred buff below. The young is similar to the female.

== Distribution and habitat ==
The greater lophorina is distributed throughout the rainforests of New Guinea. It most commonly inhabits rainforests or forest edges of Indonesia and Papua New Guinea. They can also be found inhabiting mountainous habitats of the forests in New Guinea.

The greater lophorina is also usually found on top of the trees that reside in the rainforests.

== Feeding habits ==
The greater lophorina travels across the trees in the forest to catch its prey, which can vary depending on seasonal availability of food. The male has not only been known to eat fruits and insects, but also has been spotted preying on larger animals such as frogs, reptiles, and other small birds. They can sometimes be seen foraging for food on the grounds of the forest for insects. Males are considered to be territorial, as they defend land as small as 1.2 ha. Within that land, they forage for fruits and insects.

== Predators ==
Known predators of the greater lophorina include birds of prey and snakes.

== Courtship display ==
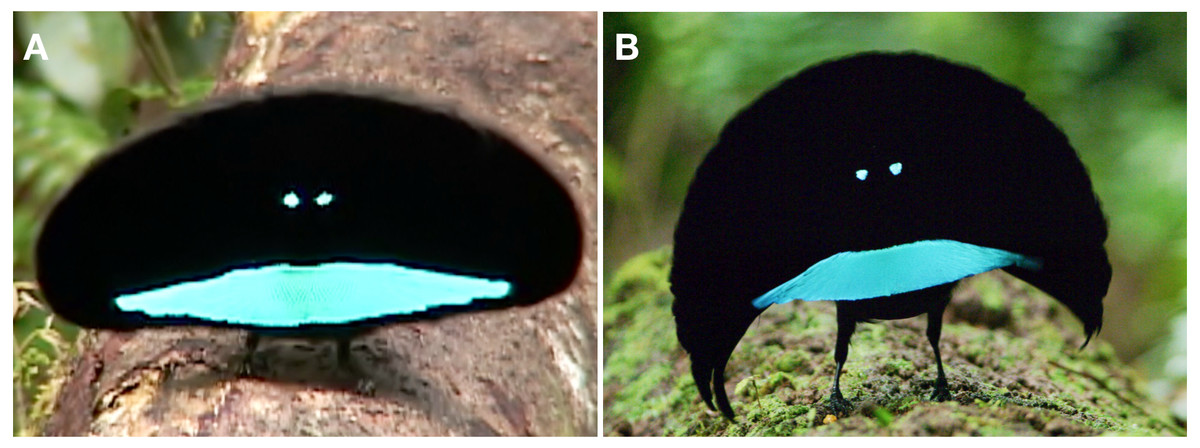
An open-winged greater lophorina.

The species has an unusually low population of females, and competition among males for mates is intensely fierce. This has led the species to have one of the most elaborate courtship displays in the avian world. There are two main stages of courtship display. The first display, known as the initial display activity, involves a series of relatively simple behaviours. The initial display is then followed by a more elaborate courtship show, known as the high-intensity display. After carefully and meticulously preparing a "dance floor" (even scrubbing the dirt or branch smooth with leaves), the male first attracts a female with a loud call. After the curious female approaches, his folded black feather cape and blue-green chest feather shield spring upward and spread widely and symmetrically around his head, instantly transforming the frontal view of the male bird into a spectacular ellipse-shaped creature that rhythmically snaps his tail feathers against each other, similar to how snapping fingers work, while hopping in frantic circles around the female. The average female rejects 15-20 potential suitors before consenting to mate. The show that males put on to attract females can be a long process that takes up many hours in a day. This species is polygynous and usually will mate with more than one female.

== Reproduction and chick behavior ==
The greater lophorina forms their nest on top of trees using soft material that they find around the forest such as leaves. When reproducing, they usually produce 1-3 eggs within a nest. It takes about 16–22 days for the eggs to hatch and for the chicks to be born. After that, chicks will be able to live on their own within 16–30 days, leaving their nest and becoming independent. Male greater lophorinas tend to take about two years longer to mature compared to the females. Also, it will take about 4–7 years for males to develop their feathers for their courtship displays.

== Status ==
Although heavily hunted for its plumes, the greater lophorina is one of the most common and widespread birds of paradise in the forests of New Guinea, and is evaluated as Least Concern on the IUCN Red List of Threatened Species. It is listed on Appendix II of CITES.

== Gallery ==
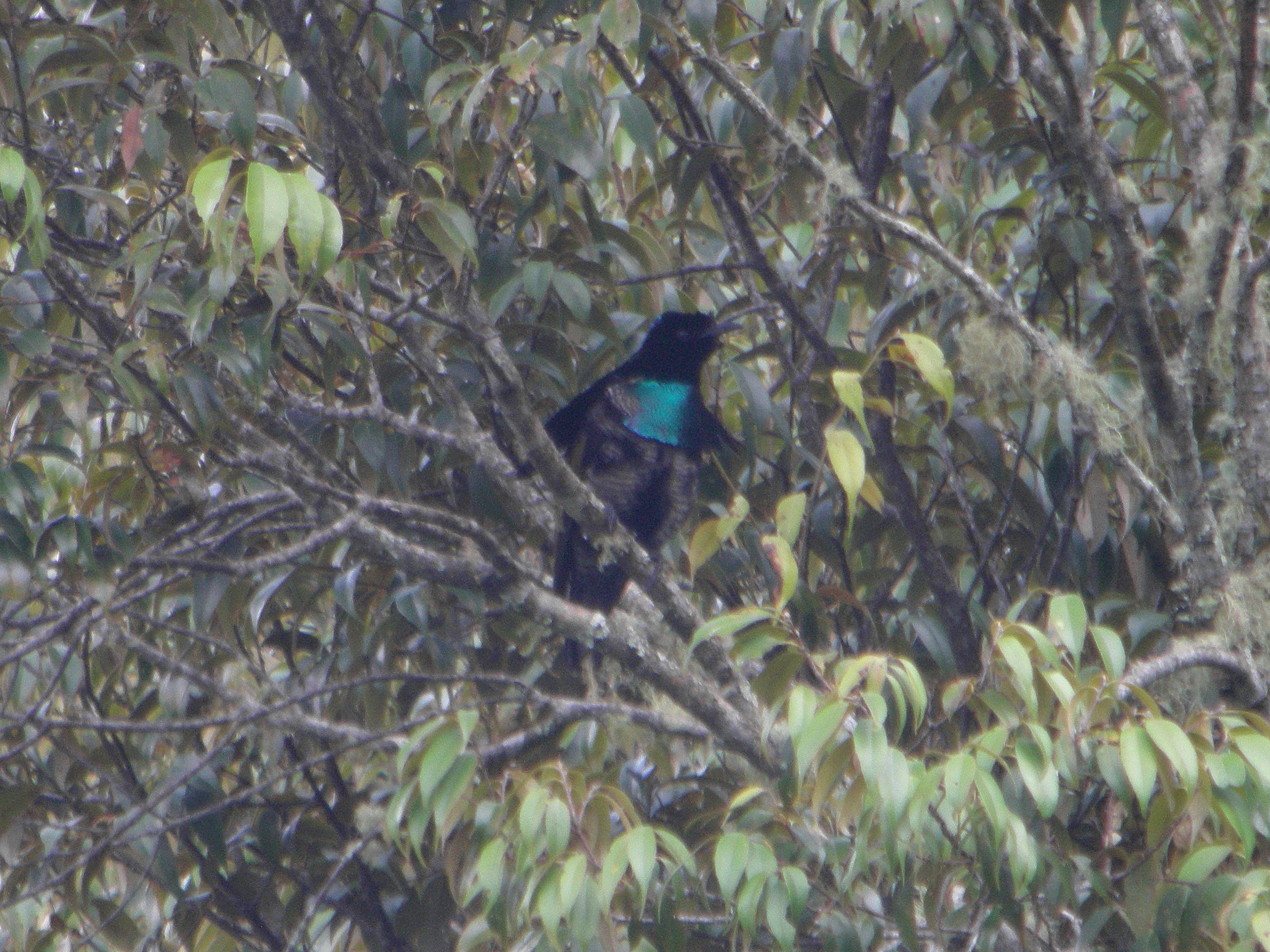
Adult male perched.

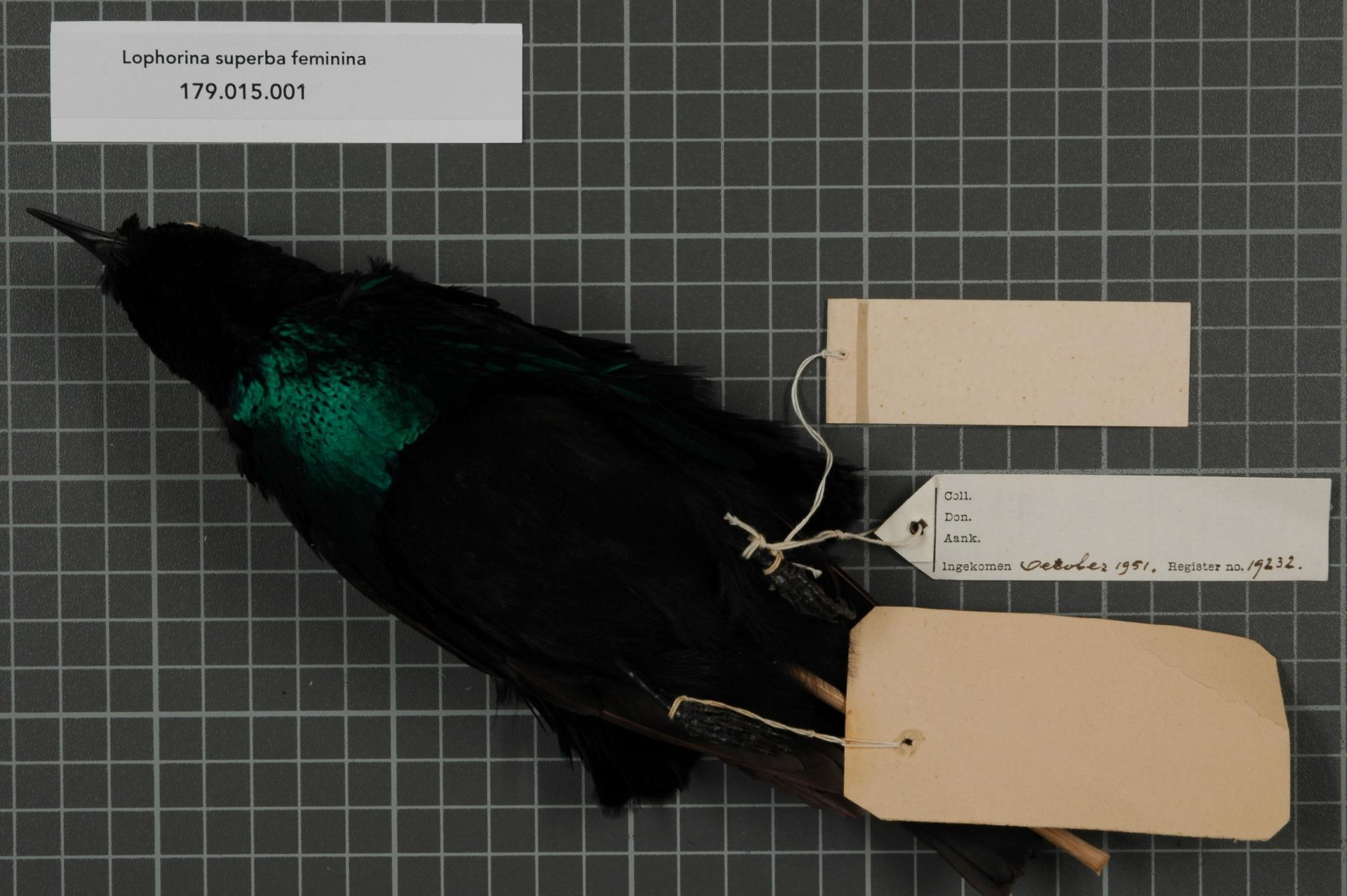
Male feminina race.

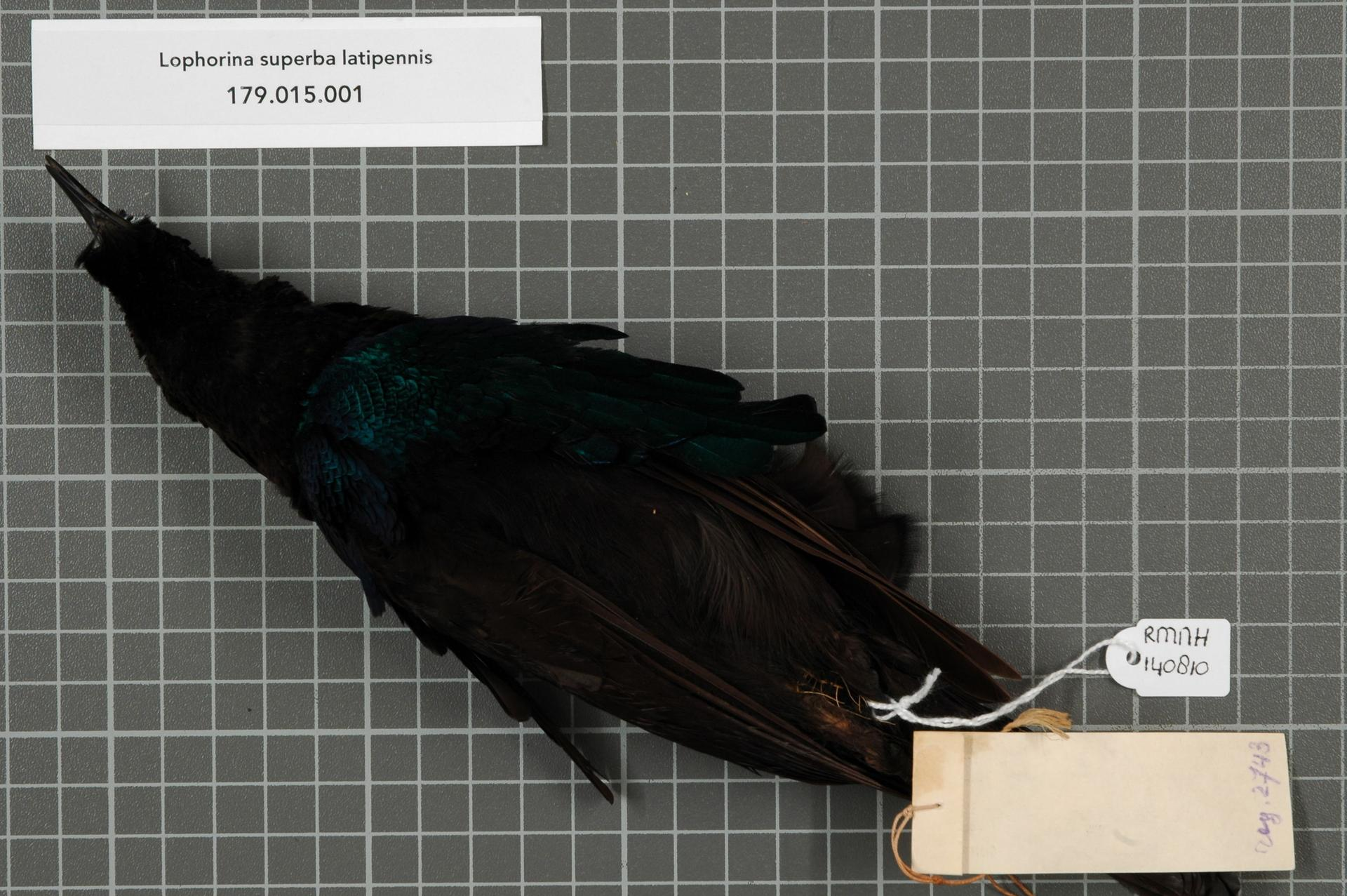
Male latipennis race.

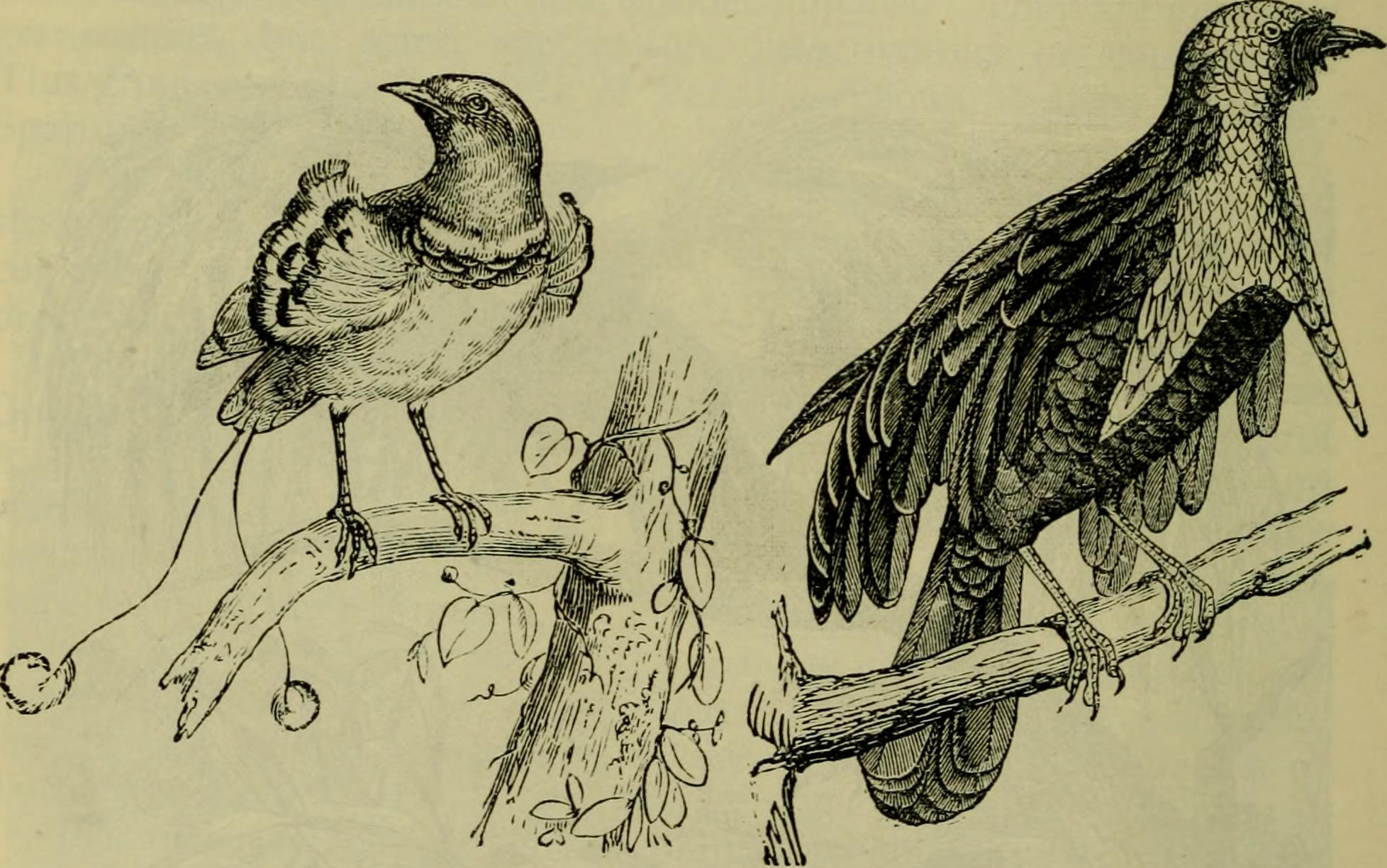
Early conception of a male next to a male King Bird-of-Paradise (Cicinnurus regius).

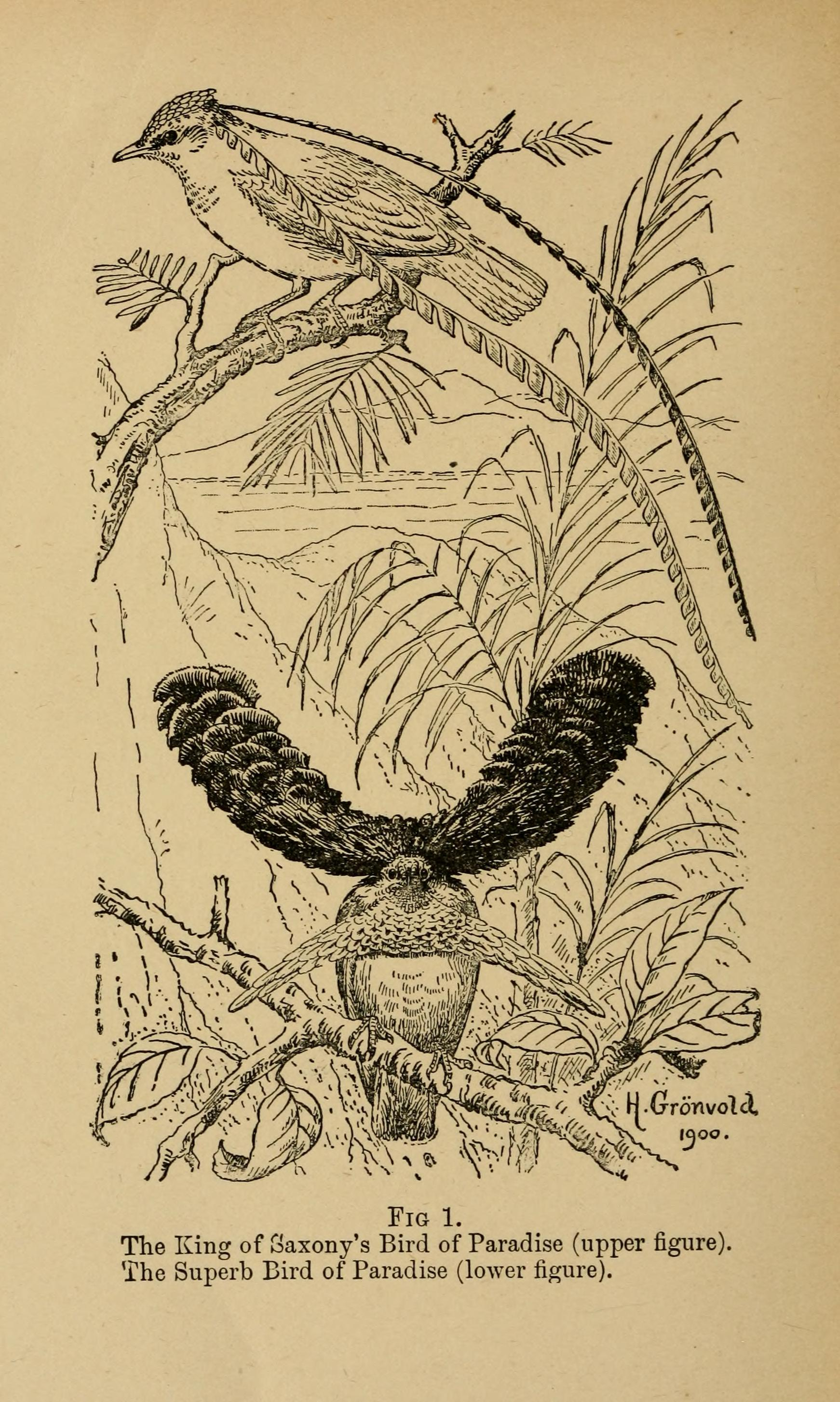
Early conception of a male perched underneath a male King of Saxony Bird-of-Paradise (Pteridophora alberti).

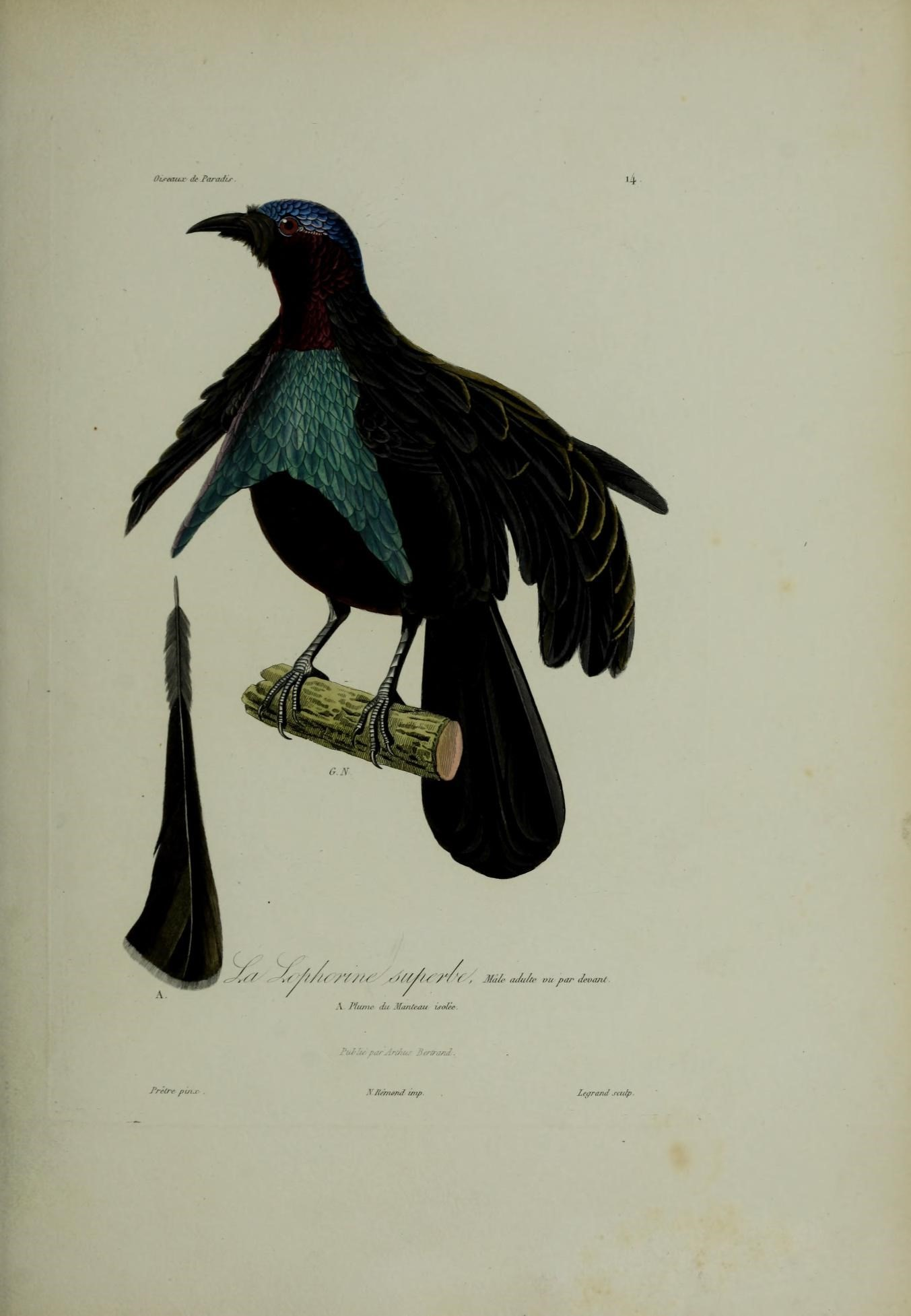
Illustration of a male (front).

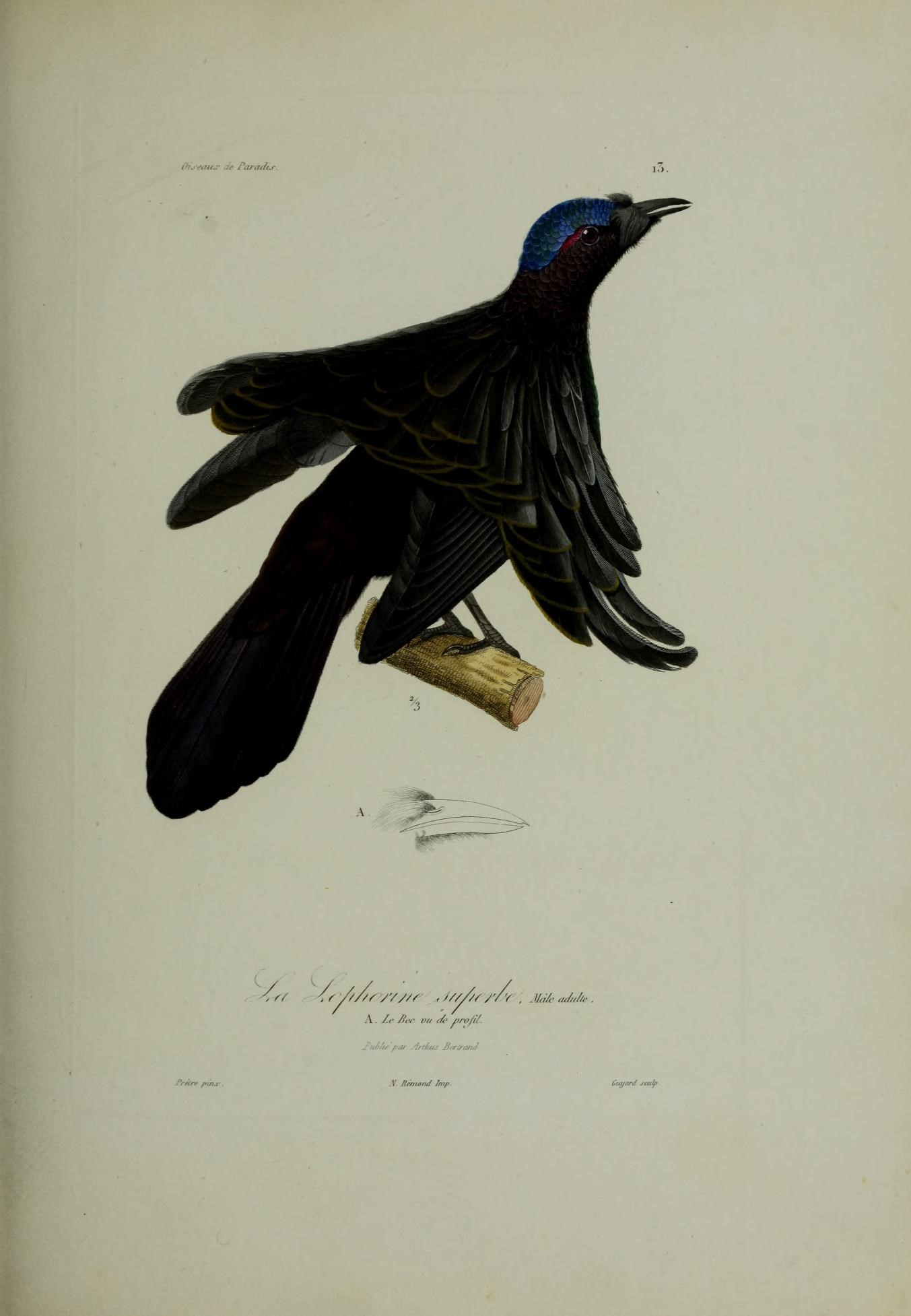
Illustration of a male (back).

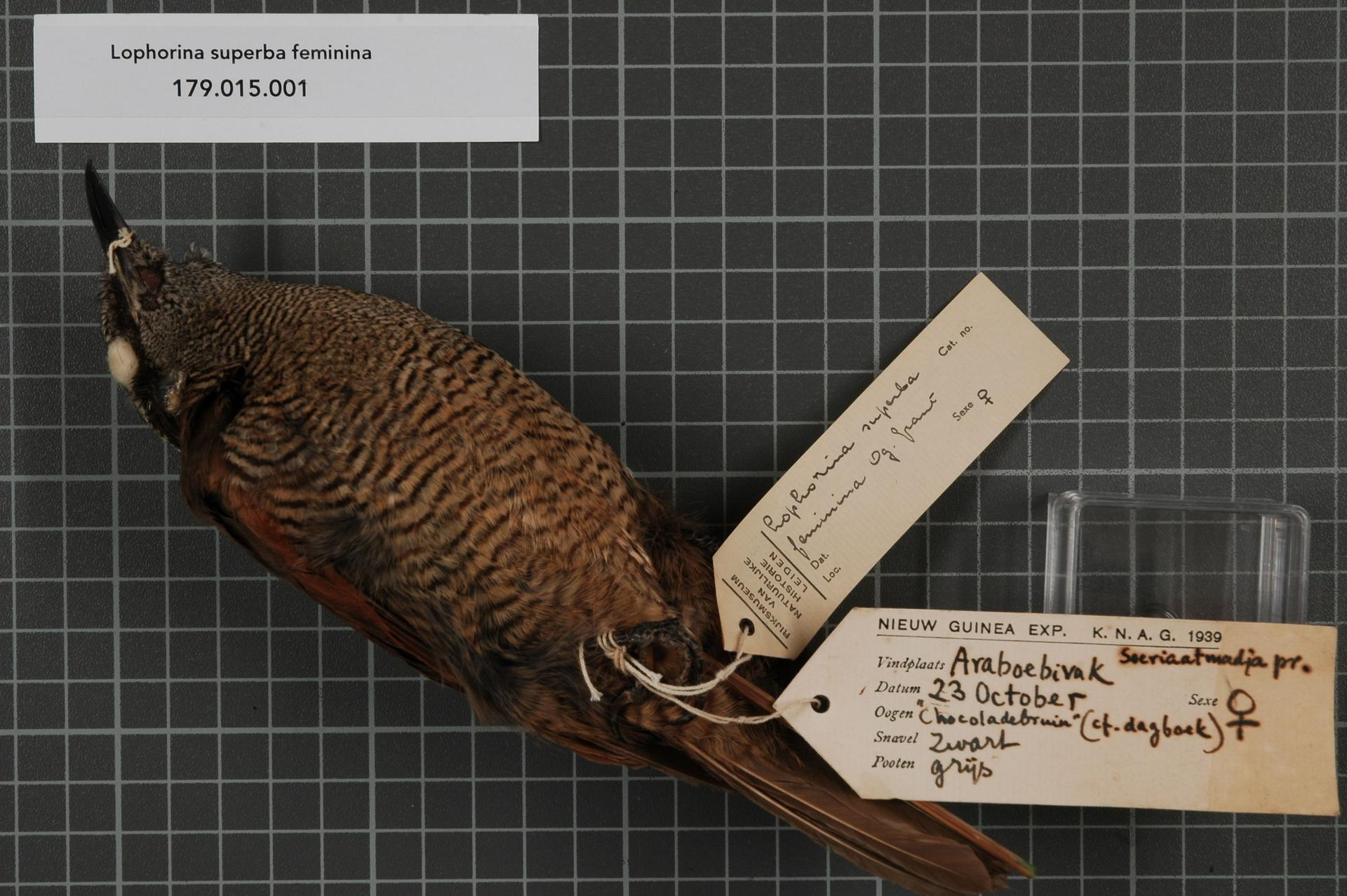
Female feminina race.

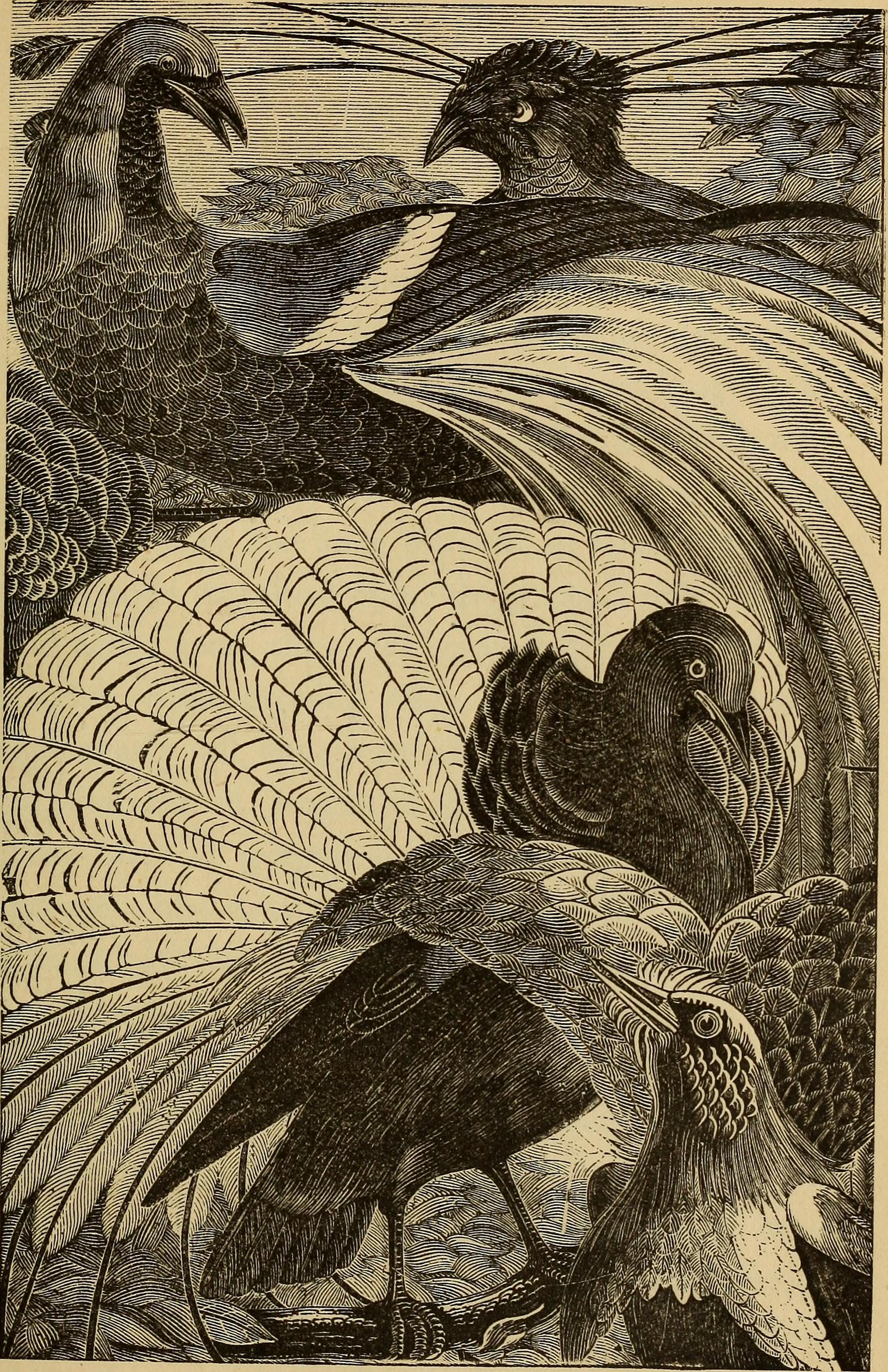
An illustration depicting early conceptions of a male Lophorina superba, as well as a Paradisea species (perhaps P. raggiana, due to the light colored bar on the wing), a Parotia species (most likely P. sefilata), and an unknown species with large, cock-like feathers; possibly a hybrid. Feathers to the far left belong to the Arfak Astrapia (A. nigra).

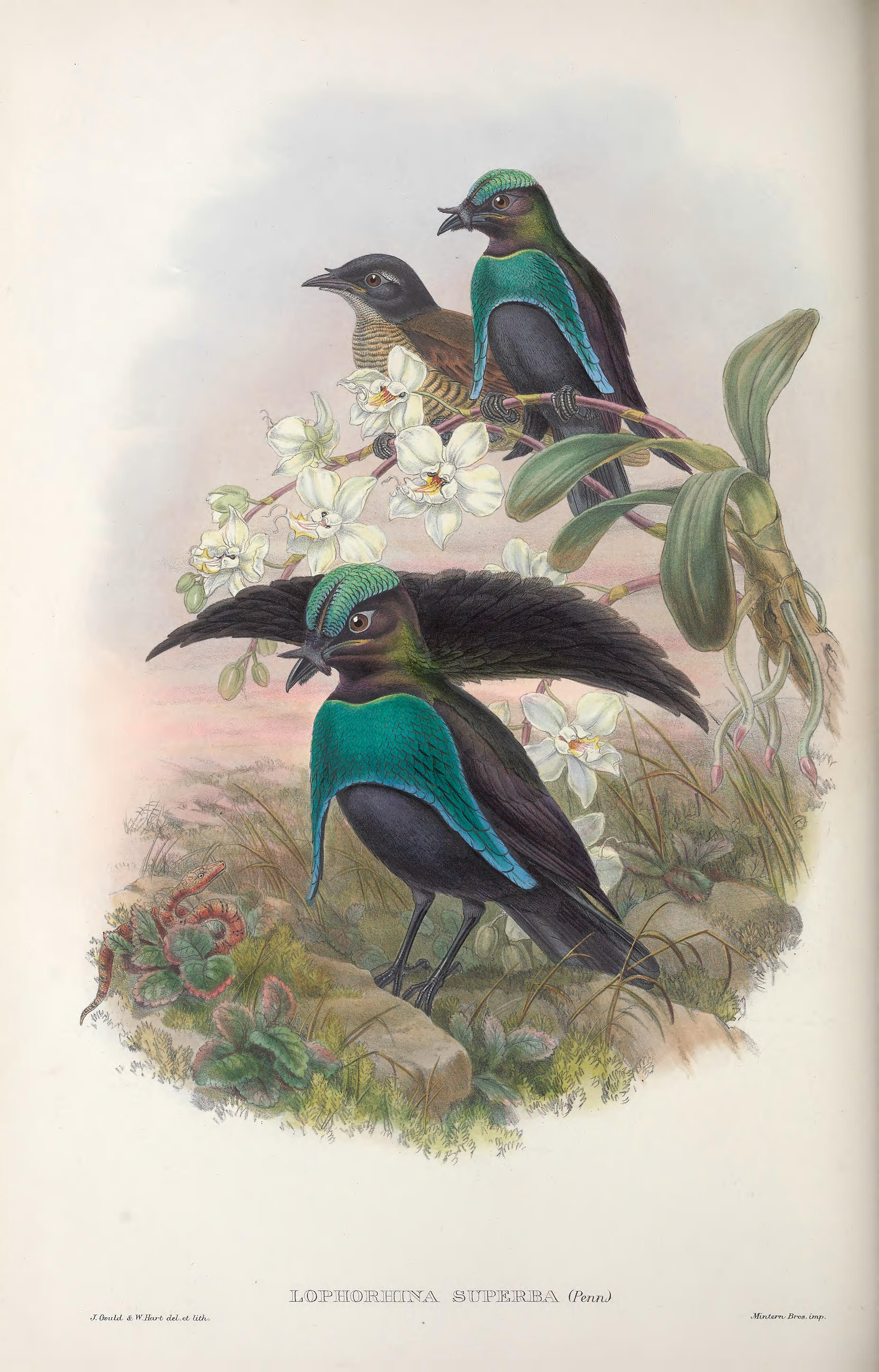
Early illustration of Lophorina superba by John Gould
