= Chinatown, Lae =

Chinatown
- Suburb
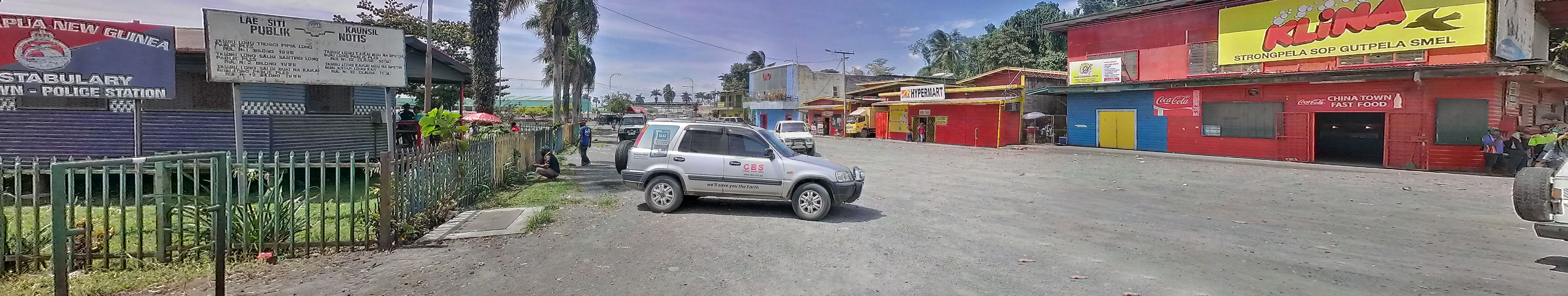
- Panoramic photo of Chinatown Lae. Facing toward Voco Point. Mt Lunaman

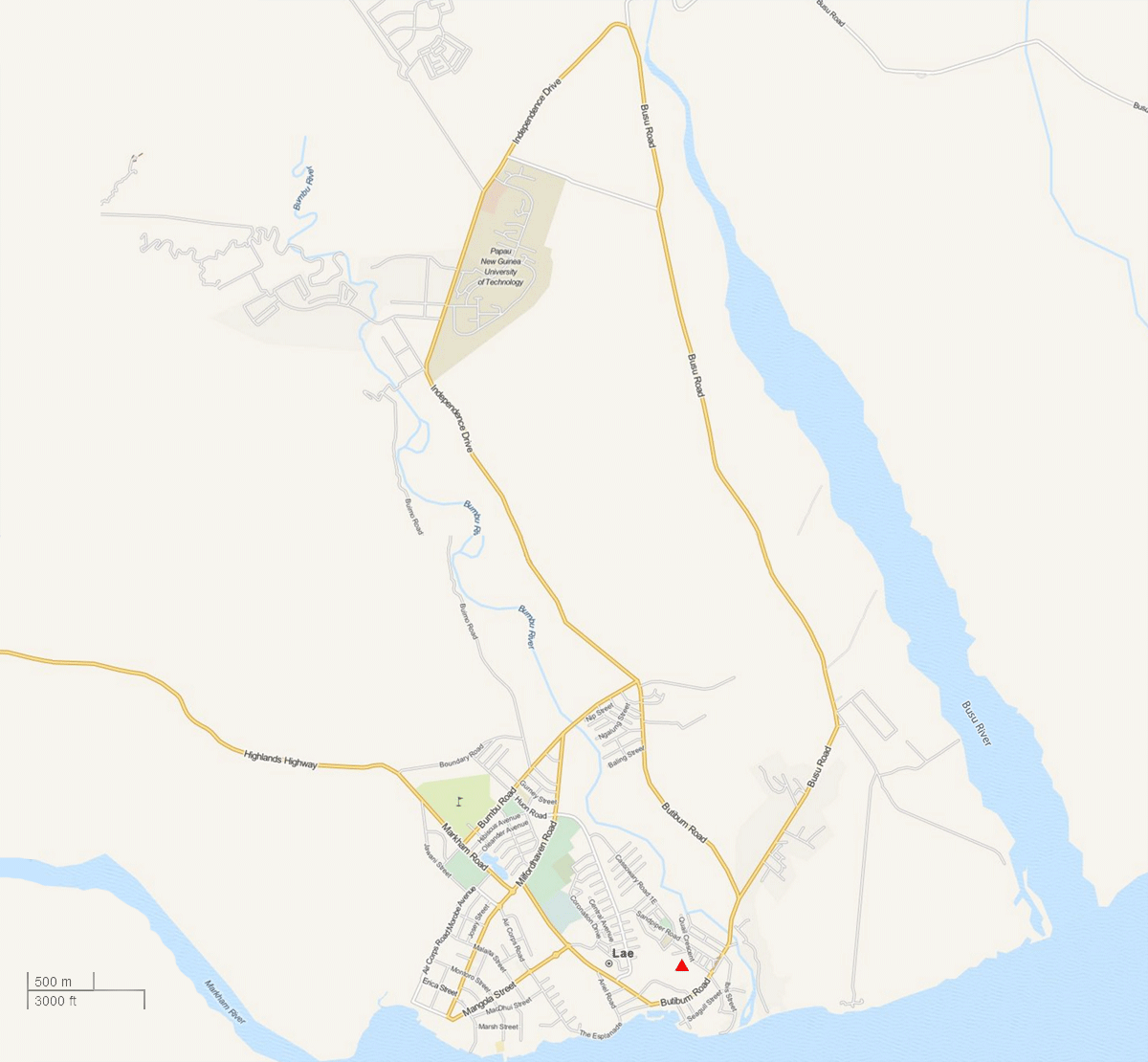
- Location in Lae
- Coordinates: 6°43′43″S 147°0′5″E
- Country: Papua New Guinea
- Province: Morobe
- District: Lae
- Time zone: UTC+10 (AEST)

Chinatown is a suburb of Lae in the Morobe Province, Papua New Guinea.

== History ==
The Chinese people of the Territory came originally from the Kwantang Province of South-east China. They came as worker immigrants in the German regime before 1914. After 1930, trade stores were established mostly by the Chinese, that catered for New Guinean needs rather than those of the Europeans. The Chinese presence created a buffer zone between the Europeans and New Guineans and furthermore established Chinatown settlements.

=== World War II ===
In October, Captain N. E. Brand of the 10th Field Ambulance and ten ORs ran an evacuation post in Chinatown Lae and on 8 September 1943, six 65th BS B-17s bombed Chinatown, a concentration of buildings and supplies at Lae. Encountering no anti-aircraft fire or enemy fighter opposition, the 65th BS historian wrote:

"Bombing was excellent. The mission was uneventful."

Lyndon B. Johnson was appointed Lieutenant Commander in the United States Naval Reserve on 21 June 1940. Eleven B-26 Marauders of the 22nd Bomb Group departed Townsville on 8 June 1942, arrived in Port Moresby and raided Lae on 9 June 1942. The mission was called "TOW 9" and Lieutenant Commander Johnson, the future 36th President of the United States, went on this raid as an observer on the aircraft, the Heckling Hare. (Note: The aircraft the Heckling Hare (#40-1488) was probably named after the cartoon The Heckling Hare.) (Note: The aircraft was also known as the Arkansas Traveller.) Nine days after the raid, Lyndon Johnson was awarded a Silver Star medal for his participation in the above bombing raid.

=== Post-World War II ===
After the war the Chinese were settled on leased land in Chinatown but in the latter years some have moved out and built modern premises in the lower terrace, in the main commercial area and on the edge of the upper terrace facing the Lae Airfield. In 1963, the Chinatown residential area was scheduled for replacement. According to the Canberra Times:

Chinatown residential area will be replaced, the Morobe District Commissioner, Mr H. Niall, announced. About 600 people live in the area in old shacks and wooden sheds.

By the early 1970s the Chinese took advantage of their elevated status as "white" Australians by engaging in larger-scale commercial businesses. They opened supermarkets and large general stores that catered to local consumers of European descent and Australian tourists. Many also purchased land and operated plantations of coffee, coconut and tea. One successful Chinese merchant in Lae even started a chartered airlines company.

Long time businessman and Papua New Guinea citizen, Sir Ling James Seeto claims that the Chinese were first recruited into the country by the Germans to do carpentry work, build boats, plumbing and other menial work. In the 1970s China town was well and truly established and trade stores were everywhere with many Chinese restaurants. (Note: The PNG Business Tourism website is an open forum where the public can post.)

== Mount Lunaman ==
At the base of Mount Lunaman at the southern and south-eastern face are the suburbs of Voco Point and Chinatown. The terraces are located to the West of Mount Lunaman.

Mount Lunaman is 96 meters high and has a radio tower at the highest point marked by red fixed obstruction lights to assist navigation. At the base of Mount Lunaman at the southern and south-eastern face are the suburbs of Voco Point and Chinatown. The terraces are located to the West of Mount Lunaman.

Mount Lunaman is known to the locals as Lo' Wamung, which means "first hill", Hospital Hill and Fortress Hill by the German settlers.

Mount Lunaman and the Lae urban area have been the subject of several tectonic studies relating to plate shift.

=== Mount Lunaman during World War II ===
Mount Lunaman was an important landmark for both Japanese and the Allies:

"The men of the South Australian battalion hammered and sawed vigorously at the top of the terrace. They were reconstructing, with captured Japanese tools, the skeleton of the cottage formerly used as the Japanese commander's sanctum. A hole beneath the door led by a tunnel to a labyrinth of passages and apertures which honeycombed Mount Lunaman".

After the war it was believed that Mount Lunaman contained the remains of many Japanese soldiers who defended Lae using tunnels:

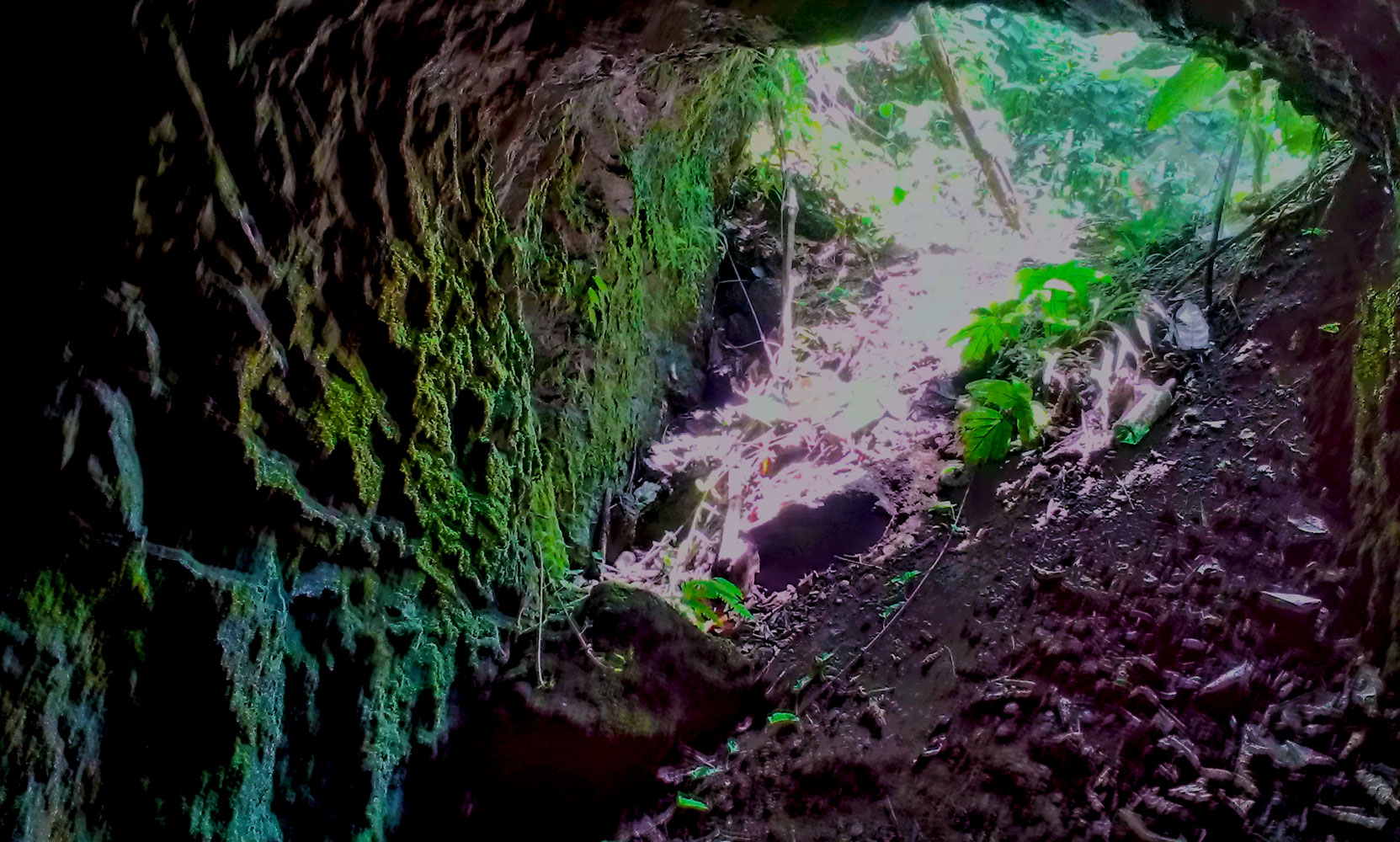
Existing Japanese World War II tunnel in Mt Lunaman. Looking out towards Chinatown.

A Japanese tomb believed to contain bodies of hundreds of Lae defenders was bought by two South Australian men for 1 pound. The tomb lies under Mount Lunaman which is said to house a hospital and when the Japanese in tunnels refused to surrender to the Australian 7th Division and 9th Division troops in 1943 all entrances were sealed.

Mount Lunaman and the Lae urban area has been the subject of several tectonic studies relating to plate shift.

== Facilities ==
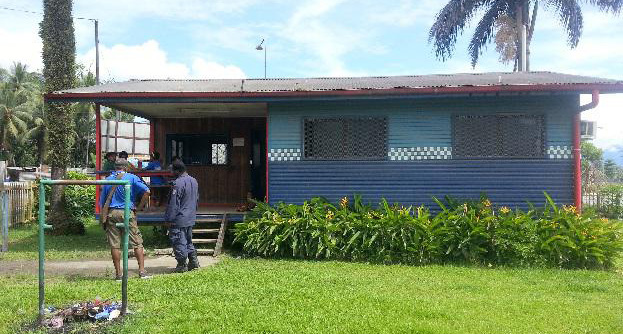
Chinatown Police Post of the Royal Papua New Guinea Constabulary

The Lae Chinese Club is located in Chinatown. The Lae Squash Racquet Association was established 1967 at the Chinese Club and has 2 glass courts and 4 squash courts and 2 tennis and 2 netball courts. The Lae (Lahi) Netball Association is also located at the Chinese Club and at one stage was the second largest competition in Papua New Guinea.

In 1962, Mrs. Flora Shaw Stewart (1886–1979) established Morobe Theatres Ltd and constructed a modern picture theatre, which opened in 1963.

== Riots ==
On 12 May 2009, Port Moresby experienced an anti-Asian demonstration following similar demonstrations in the Solomon Islands. The riots spread to Lae, Madang, Goroka, Kainantu and Mount Hagen targeting trade stores and kai (food) bars. Four Papua New Guinean nationals and three ethnic Chinese died during the riots, which were particularly violent in Lae and Mt Hagen. Before 10am, all shops, Chinese and local, all over the city were forced to close in fear of being looted.

== Schools ==
The Huonville International Primary School is located in Chinatown.

== See also ==
- Chinese in PNG
