= Gari L. Baki =

Gari L. Baki is the former commissioner of police for the Royal Papua New Guinea Constabulary. He was a career Officer joining the Cadet Program before his posting to Enga Province serving as the Police Station Commander(PSC) at Wabag Police Station in 1979. He was first appointed commissioner of police from 2007 to 2011 before his current second term from July 2015. He hails from Ganeboku Village in the Talasea area of West New Britain Province.
