= Philip Bouraga =

Public servant and politician in Papua New Guinea

Sir Philip Bouraga KBE

Papua New Guineaan High Commissioner to the United Kingdom
- In office 1989–1991?

Minister of Finance of Papua New Guinea
- In office 1982–1985
- Preceded by: John Kaputin
- Succeeded by: Sir Julius Chan

Commissioner of Police of Papua New Guinea
- In office 1979–1982
- Preceded by: William Penias Tiden
- Succeeded by: Henry Tokam

Personal details
- Born: 30 September 1940 Kikori, Gulf Province, Territory of Papua and New Guinea (now Papua New Guinea)
- Died: 31 October 2021 (aged 81)

Sir Philip Bouraga KBE (1940 – 2021) was a former police commissioner of Papua New Guinea (PNG) from 1979 to 1982, a member of the parliament of the country between 1982 and 1987, the minister of finance from 1982 to 1985, and the country's High Commissioner to the United Kingdom from 1989.

== Early life ==
Bouraga was born on 30 September 1940, the son of Henao (née Aria) and Bouraga Taunakekei, of Kikori in the Gulf Province of Papua New Guinea. During the time of Australian rule of the Territory of Papua and New Guinea he was, in 1962, the first locally appointed Cadet Patrol Officer or Kiap, a position that had previously been taken by young Australian men. He was appointed district commissioner in 1974 for East New Britain Province in which capacity he received Queen Elizabeth II when she visited Rabaul, at the time the provincial capital, in February, 1974. The Queen expressed surprise at how young he was.

== Later career ==
Rabaul was considered a stepping stone for many civil servants and Bouraga's next posting was to become secretary to the prime minister, Michael Somare, who had been impressed with his performance in East New Britain. He was then appointed commissioner of the Royal Papua New Guinea Constabulary on 3 May 1979, resigning on 17 February 1982 after a disagreement with the police minister, Warren Dutton. He turned down a position as ambassador to the United Nations in New York in 1980. His appointment as police commissioner had caused some controversy in the first place because senior police officers had considered that the choice should have been made from amongst them, whereas he was an outsider.

In 1982 he became the MP for the National Capital District regional seat and was immediately appointed as minister of finance. Leaving that position in 1985, he was appointed a member of the Permanent Parliamentary Committee on Public Accounts, until the end of that parliament in 1987. In 1989 he was appointed as PNG's High Commissioner in London.

== Death ==
Bouraga died on 31 October 2021. After his retirement from public life he lived in Gabagaba in the Central Province of PNG.

== Awards and honours ==
Bouraga was made an Officer of the Order of the British Empire (OBE) in September 1975 (Papua New Guinea's Independence List) for outstanding public service, was made a CBE in the 1979 New Year's Honours List, and was made Knight Commander (KBE) in the 2005 Birthday List of Queen Elizabeth II.
