= Dowsett, Papua New Guinea =

Dowsett
- Suburb
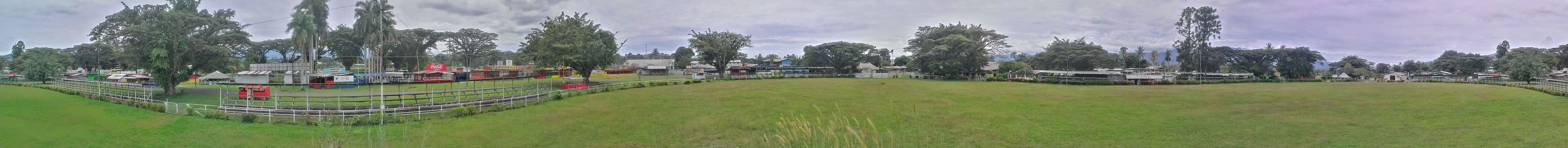
- Panoramic photo of Lae Showgrounds, Markam Rd. Dowsett

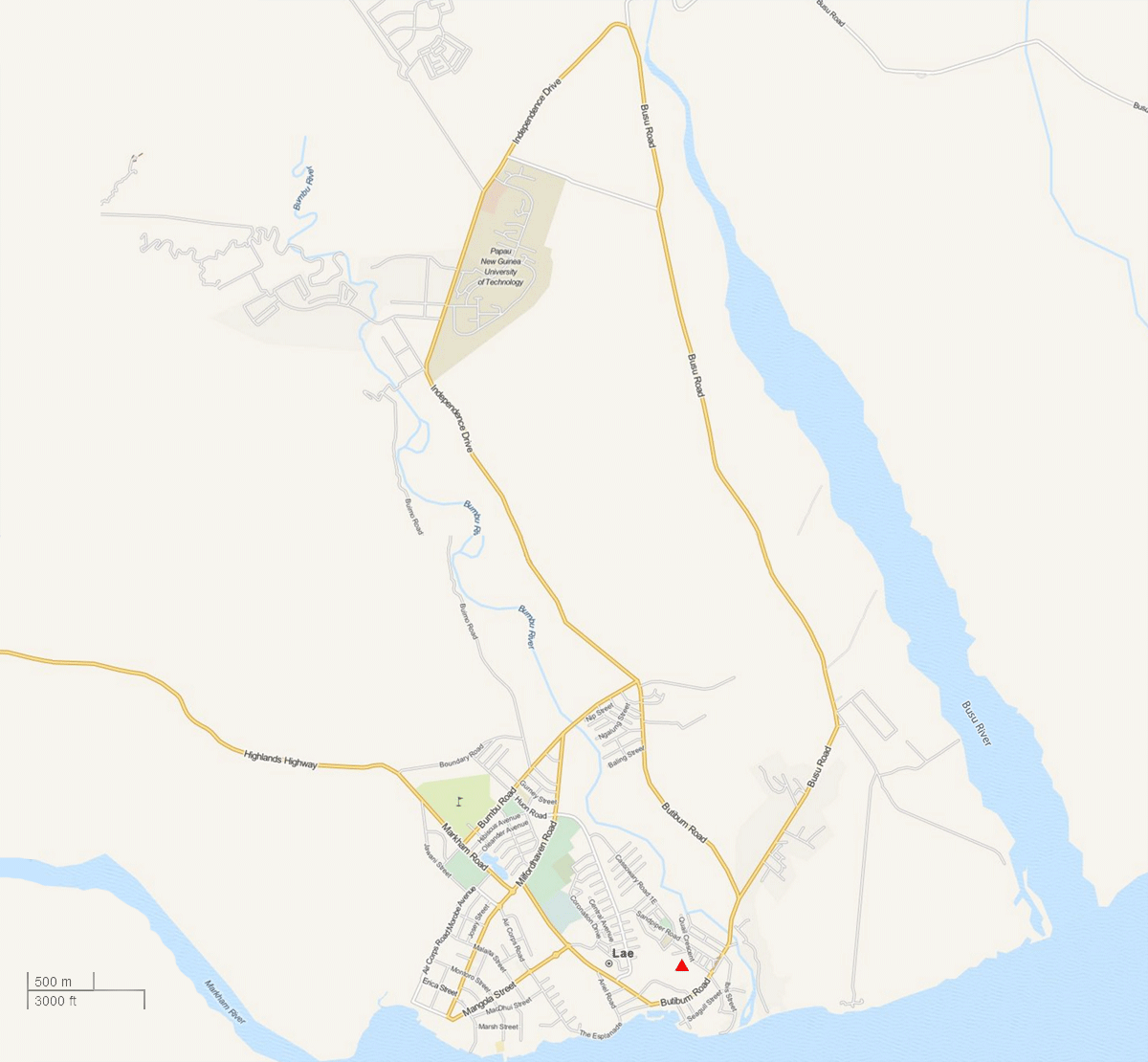
- Location in Lae
- Coordinates: 6°43′10″S 146°58′10″E
- Country: Papua New Guinea
- Province: Morobe Province
- District: Lae District
- Time zone: UTC+10 (AEST)

Dowsett is a suburb of Lae in the Morobe Province, Papua New Guinea.

== Location ==
Dowsett is located on the North West side of Lae with Bugandi located to the East. Markham Road, which in turn becomes the Highlands Highway is the main thoroughfare through the suburb.

== Papuan Compound ==
Within the suburb is the Papuan Compound established in the 1960s.

The population, according to the latest census is 130 households with 770 residents. Local persons can lease cheap sites and build houses limited by their budget. Often however, many leaseholders left the location without formally transferring the lease and were not able to be located. Further research has indicated that the residents of settlements such as the Papuan Compound have found to be all from the same district.

== Morobe Showgrounds ==
The Morobe Lae Showgrounds are located in the suburb. The first Morobe Show was held in 1959, but on three occasions the Show had to be cancelled. In 1983, Lae was isolated by floods, in 1991 law and order problems caused a curfew to be imposed from 6 am to 6 pm and in 2009 an outbreak of cholera in the province made it unwise to have a large gathering of people.

Mrs. Flora Shaw Stewart (1886–1979) was a founding member of the Morobe Agricultural Society and would often lead the grand parades at annual shows.

The festivities start one week before the Show with the Lae Show Ball in the decorated Pavilion with music supplied by the Papua New Guinea Police Band and catering provided by the Lae International Hotel.

In 1968, the University of Technology relocated from Port Moresby to Lae and during the process students had to be housed in temporary accommodation at the showgrounds.

In 1983 and 1992, major floods devastated the region with relief operations described as haphazard, unsystematic and often uncoordinated. The initial response by the provincial disaster committee was to evacuate the victims immediately to temporary care centres at the Lae show grounds and Igam Army Barracks.

== See also ==
- Morobe Show
