= Herzog Mountains =

Mountain range in Papua New Guinea

- Location within Papua New Guinea

Geography
- State: Papua New Guinea
- Range coordinates: 6°46′S 146°48′E

The Herzog Mountains are a mountain range in Morobe Province, Papua New Guinea. It contains the 1389 m Mount Herzog which lies about 22 km west of Lae. Other mountains in the range include Garagos, Misantum, Shungol, Ngaroneno, and Sugarloaf.
