= Royal Papua New Guinea Constabulary =

National police force

- Motto: "Securing A Safer Community"

Agency overview
- Formed: c.1950; 76 years ago
- Preceding agencies: Royal Papuan Constabulary; New Guinea Police Force

Jurisdictional structure
- National agency: Papua New Guinea
- Operations jurisdiction: Papua New Guinea
- Governing body: Government of Papua New Guinea
- General nature: Local civilian police

Operational structure
- Headquarters: Port Moresby, Papua New Guinea
- Sworn members: 4800
- Minister responsible: Peter Tsiamalili, Minister for Internal Security (2022-Present)
- Agency executive: David Manning, MBE, CSTJ, QPM, Commissioner of Police

Website
- www.rpngc.gov.pg

The Royal Papua New Guinea Constabulary (RPNGC) is a national police force with jurisdiction throughout Papua New Guinea.

== History ==
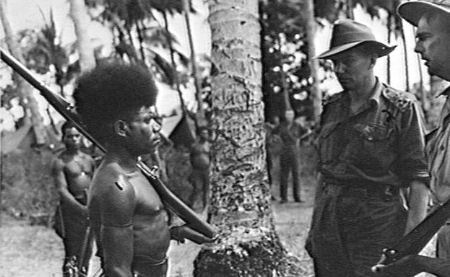
September, 1943 – Battle of Kaiapit – "Yarawa" (left) of the Royal Papuan Constabulary is congratulated for single-handedly capturing a Japanese sergeant by Brigadier I. N. Dougherty (center) and WO2 L. P. Seale of ANGAU (right)

The RPNGC was formed from two predecessor bodies that existed prior to the independence of Papua New Guinea. The Royal Papuan Constabulary, initially established by the Australian colonial administration as part of setting up Papua in the late 19th century, and the New Guinea Police Force which covered the former German New Guinea and British New Guinea also set up by Australia, initially during World War I and formalized as part of the League of Nations mandate of 1920.

The constabulary played a significant role in resisting the Japanese occupation of New Guinea during World War II. For example, the Lae War Cemetery holds the names of 13 police officers (panel 8) who died during the war.

The two colonial territories were gradually amalgamated during and after World War II leading to the merger of the two forces. The structure was retained after Papua New Guinea gained independence in 1975, although the name shifted from Royal Papua and New Guinea Constabulary to the present name with the removal of the "and" in 1972.

== Special language ==
The RPNGC is known for the historic use of Police Motu, a lingua franca pidgin variant of the Motu language. During the colonial period, personnel needed to effectively administer the colony were scarce, so the colonial government recruited constables from the various Papua New Guinean peoples and nearby islands such as Fiji and the Solomon Islands. These recruits may have spoken any of about 700–800 different indigenous languages. To aid in communication, a common language was needed and the Police Motu pidgin arose.

The language was widely used not just by police but also by colonial administrators. It was renamed Hiri Motu in the 1970s, due to the connotations of the word "police" and became one of the official languages of Papua New Guinea.

== Organization ==
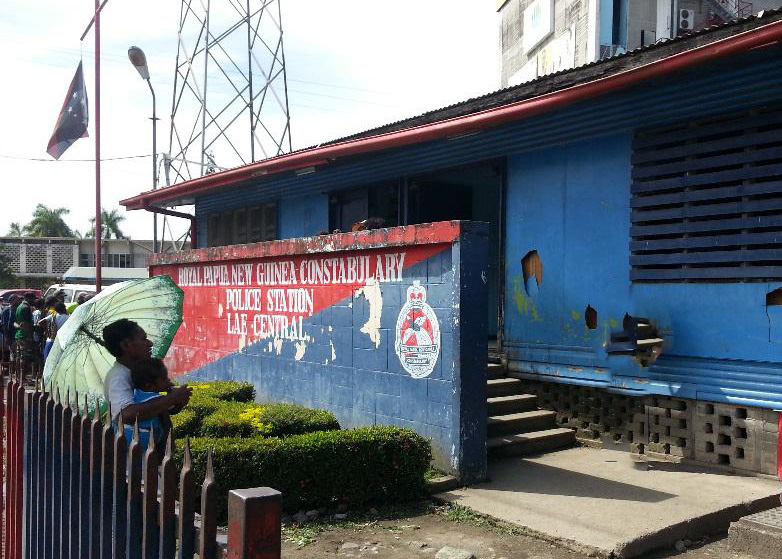
Lae Central Police Station in 2014

The RPNGC is part of the Law and Justice Sector of the government of Papua New Guinea. It is headquartered in Konedobu, a suburb of Port Moresby, the capital city, in the National Capital District. As of 2019, the Police Commissioner is David Manning, with several Deputy Commissioners having responsibility for organizational functions and regions.

The RPNGC has been aided in the past by various Australian initiatives, including supplying police forces and providing hundreds of millions of Australian dollars in assistance with budget, equipment and staffing. This aid is governed under the 1989 Treaty on Development Cooperation and has been carried out in several 5 year phases. For example, in phase II of the aid project, Australia budgeted A$80 million to deploy 53 full-time officers and materiel support. Phase III of the same program saw a proposal for an Enhanced Cooperation Programme with over 200 officers dispatched to aid in operations in 2004. However, after the PNG Supreme Court ruled the officers were not immune from prosecution, they were withdrawn amid diplomatic wrangling.

The RPNGC makes use of Community Auxiliary Police, volunteer forces that aid in policing rural communities.

== Challenges ==
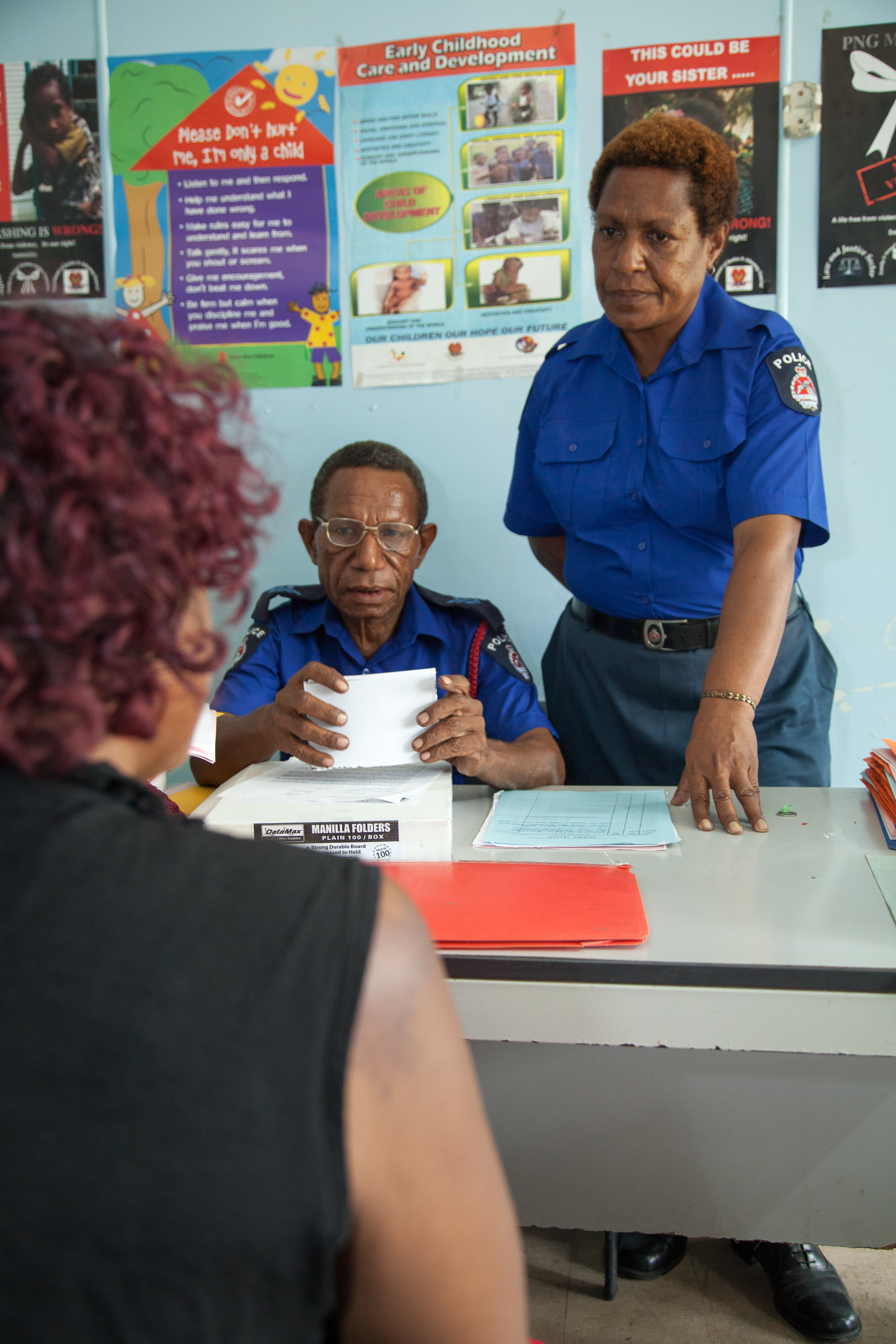
Officers of the Family and Sexual Violence Unit at Waigani Police Station, Port Moresby

Papua New Guinea does not have a tradition of strong local police authorities. The RPNGC has around 4800 constables charged with enforcing the law in a country of seven million people. The RPNGC faces obstacles in trying to gain the cooperation of PNG communities, which frequently prefer to deal with criminals by themselves using their knowledge based on their customs.

The Constabulary also faces resource constraints (including shortages of such basic supplies as gasoline and stationery) and difficulties with internal discipline. Consequently, police are spread fairly thin, with correspondingly slow response times. While the Constabulary has a code of ethics, the Human Rights Watch has noted difficulties such as reports of beatings and rape by officers, citizens alleging they feel less safe when police are around, female victims being asked for sex when reporting crimes, and general corruption. Amnesty International in a February 1, 2006 letter to then Minister for Internal Security, Bire Kimisopa and then Commissioner of Police, Sam Inguba, claimed to have documented "extensive evidence of members of the RPNGC subjecting women and girls in custody to rape and other forms of cruel, inhumane and degrading treatment", as well as requests for sexual favors from female victims before investigating crimes, and suggested additional recruitment of female police officers as a way to address the issue.

However, despite the internal issues, the RPNGC has been involved in giving aid to other countries and organizations in the region. For example, aid has been given to the Solomon Islands as part of the RAMSI since July 2003.

== P.N.G – Australian-Policing Partnership ==
The Australian government made a commitment to the PNG Government to deploy 50 Australian Federal Police to Port Moresby and Lae by the end of 2013 as part of Phase 4 of the Expanded Police Partnership.

The aim of the expanded policing partnership is to improves the law enforcement capabilities of the RPNGC across key areas including:

- public safety
- station management and supervision
- community liaison and engagement
- traffic operations
- criminal investigations
- sexual offences.

While on duty, the Australian police officers wear their AFP uniforms which include the mission logo wok wantaim (working together). Their vehicles also prominently display the mission logo.

== Crime statistics ==
Credible national crime statistics are not published by the RPNGC. For the first time, UNDP published a national homicide rate of 13.0/100,000 in the 2013 Human Development Report, but the origin of this figure is unknown.

== Ranks ==
Royal Papua New Guinea Constabulary
Ranks (1975–2000)	Commissioner	Deputy Commissioner	Assistant Commissioner	Chief superintendent		Superintendent	Chief inspector	Inspector	Sub inspector	Chief sergeant	Senior sergeant	Sergeant	Senior constable	Constable first class	Constable
Epaulette Insignia (1975–2000)															
Ranks (2000–present)	Commissioner	Deputy Commissioner	Assistant Commissioner	Chief superintendent	Superintendent	Chief inspector	Senior inspector	Inspector		Chief sergeant	Senior sergeant	Sergeant	Senior constable	Constable first class	Constable
Epaulette Insignia (2000–present)															

== Commissioners ==
- Pius Barbey Kerepia
- William Penias Tiden
- Sir Philip Bouraga
- Henry Tokam
- David D. Tasion
- Paul Tohian
- Ila Geno
- Robert Nenta
- Peter Aigilo
- John Wakon
- Joseph Kupo
- Peter Ilau
- Francis Agwi
- Sam Inguba
- Anthony Wagambie Snr
- Tom Kulunga
- Geoffrey Vaki
- Gari L. Baki
- David Manning

== Gallery ==
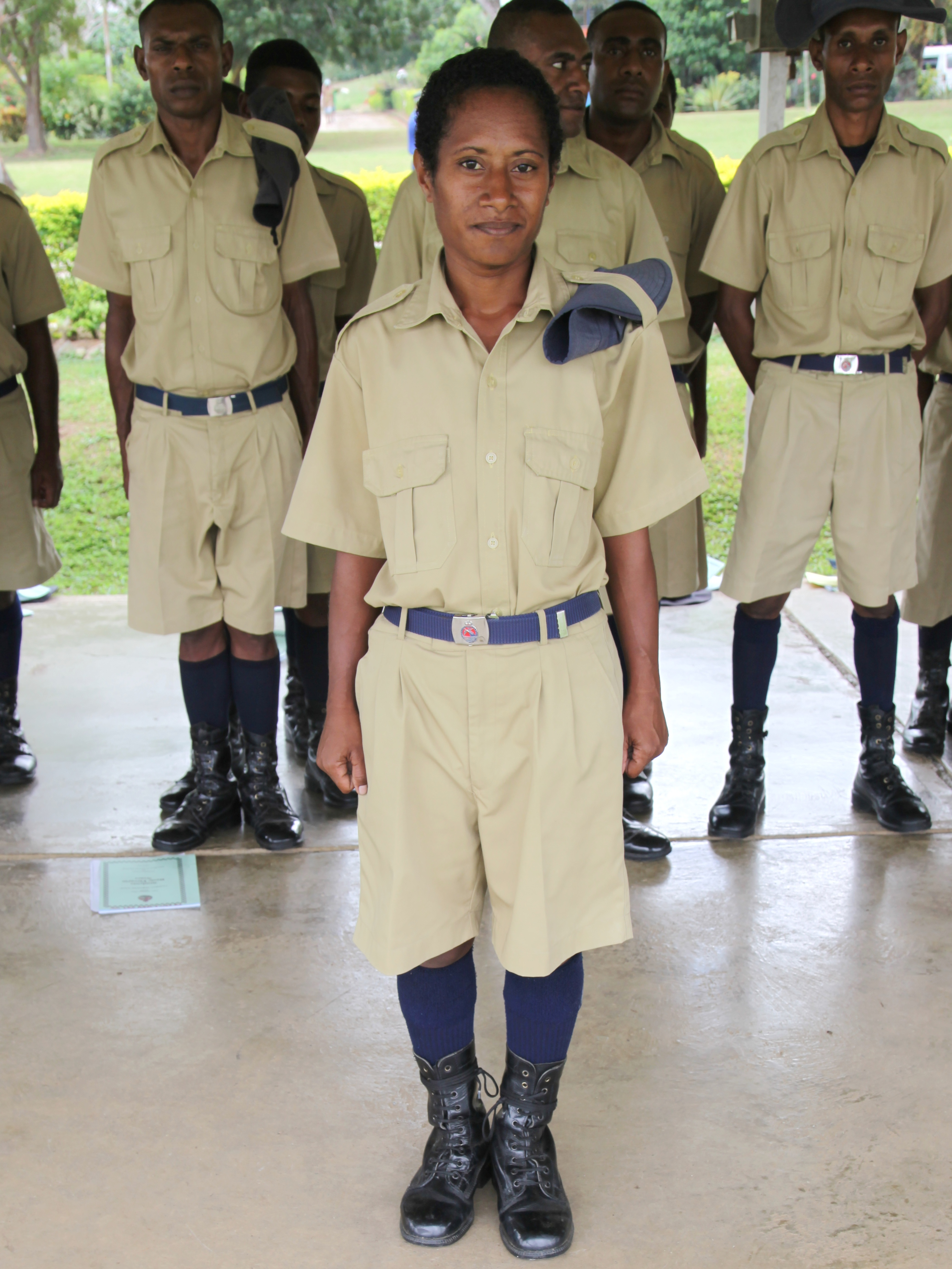
Police recruits in training

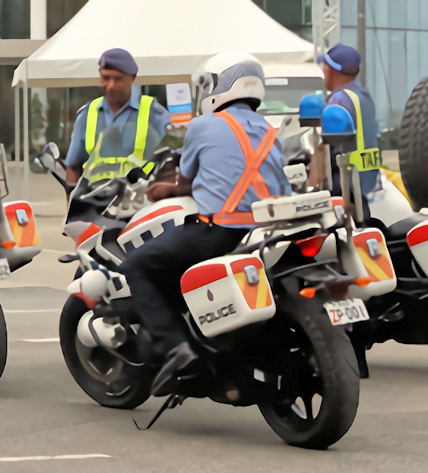
Police motorbike in Port Moresby

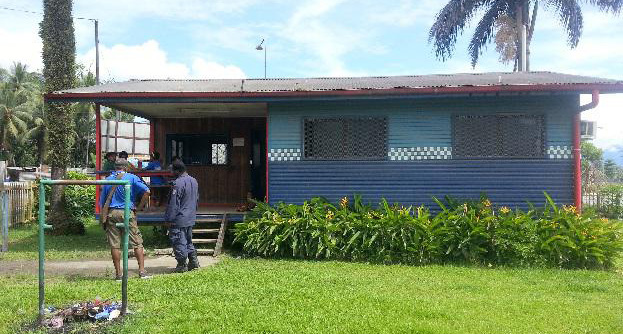
Chinatown Police Post, Lae

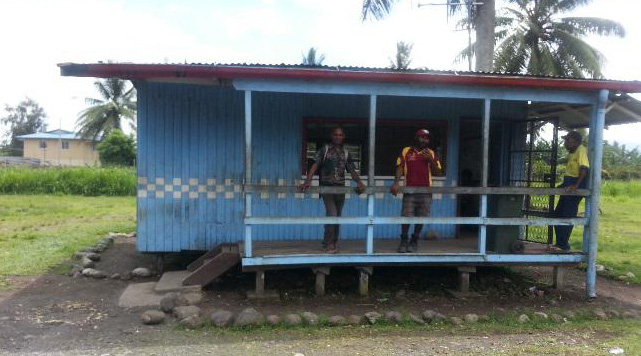
Omili Police Post, Lae

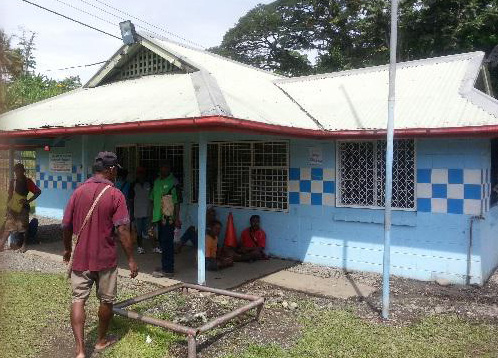
3 Mile Police Post, Lae
