= J. Morewood Dowsett =

English big-game hunter, naturalist and writer

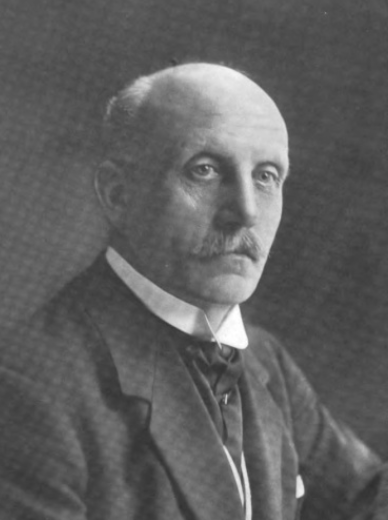
- Born: 14 May 1864; London
- Died: 2 April 1955 (aged 90); Willesden
- Occupations: Naturalist, writer

Joseph Morewood Dowsett (14 May 1864 - 2 April 1955) F.R.G.S., F.Z.S. was an English big-game hunter, naturalist and writer. From the 1930s, Dowsett took interest in animal welfare.

== Biography ==
Dowsett was born in London. He contributed to The English Review, The Telegraph, The Morning Post and The Times. In 1883, Dowsett joined the Civil Service in New Zealand but soon resigned and took up wild-game hunting. Dowsett hunted big-game in Africa, Albania, Canada, Iceland and New Zealand. He described his experiences in his book Big Game and Big Life, published in 1925. A review in The Geographical Journal concluded that "the book is quite interesting, and in some parts distinctly amusing, though perhaps a little egoistical."

In 1942, Dowsett authored The Romance of England's Forests a well-illustrated book dealing with forests of England through the ages.

== Animal welfare ==
In his later years, Dowsett supported animal welfare. He became associated with the Animal Defence and Anti-Vivisection Society and at a meeting in 1934, gave a speech opposing rodeo performances.

In 1936, he authored Animal Life Yesterday and To-Day, which campaigned against cruelty to animals and vivisection.

== Selected publications ==
- Snake Life Simply Told (1900, 1928, 1933)
- On the Spoor of the Elephant (1923)
- Big Game and Big Life (with a Foreword by R. B. Cuninghame Graham, 1925)
- The Spanish Bull Ring (1928)
- How Animals Live (1931)
- Animal Life Yesterday and To-Day (1936)
- Elephant Past and Present (1939)
- The Romance of England's Forests (1942, 1944, 1948)
