= 3 Mile, Lae =

3 Mile
- Suburb
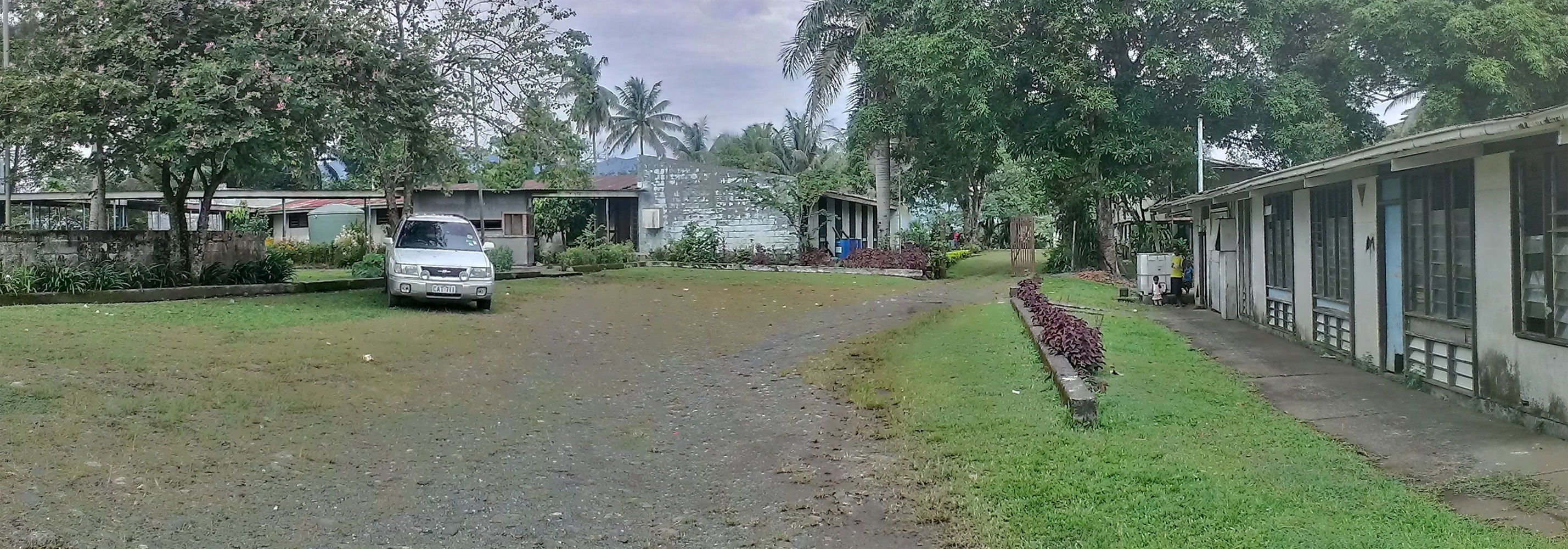
- 3 Mile Agricultural Training Centre buildings on foothills of Atzera Range

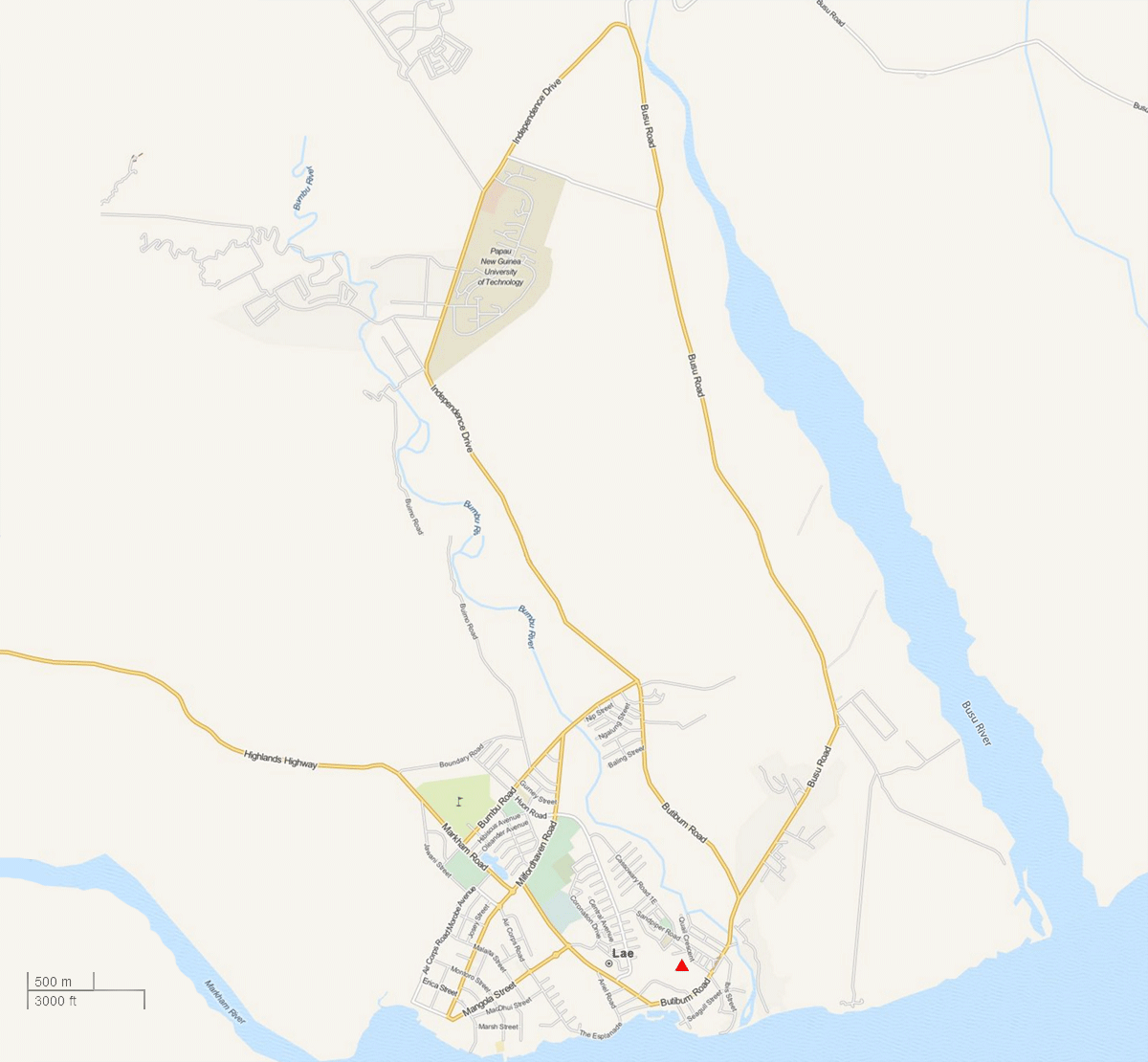
- Location in Lae
- Coordinates: 6°42′50″S 146°57′11″E
- Country: Papua New Guinea
- Province: Morobe Province
- District: Lae District
- Time zone: UTC+10 (AEST)

3 Mile is a suburb of Lae in the Morobe Province, Papua New Guinea.

== Geography ==
3 Mile is located 3 miles (4.8 km) from the center of Lae on the Highlands Highway between the foothills of the Atzera Range and the Markham River. The Atzera Range starts at Bugandi and runs adjacent to the Markham River has an elevation of 280 meters above sea level.

Anticlines in the vicinity of Lae, such as the Atzera Range and hills near Situm, appear to indicate that the Ramu-Markham Fault (which follows the northern edge of the Markham Valley) changes dip close to the surface from a steep ramp to a shallow fault, breaching the surface south of Lae.

Before the construction of the Highlands Highway, a road in the Atzera foothills connected Nadzab with Lae and a rough trail on the other side of the Atzeras paralleled this road from Lae to Yalu. Jensen's plantation was located in the Markham Valley and the location of battles between Japanese and Australian soldiers. On 10 September the 25th Australian Infantry Brigade moved East from Nadzab towards Lae along the Atzera foothills while the 9th Division approached Lae from the East and on 16 September both units converged on Lae

The Lae Seismic Zone has been identified between the Atzera Range and Situm which has the potential to generate shallow Mw~7.0 earthquakes and landslides around the Atzera Range. The possibility of major landsides in this area has increased as a result of human modification to the natural vegetation cover through clearing and gardening.

The 1983 floods remain the worst natural disaster since the establishment of the town in the late 1920s. Hundreds of people at the Five Mile settlement along the Highland Highway were also affected by mud-slides from the Atzera mountain ranges.

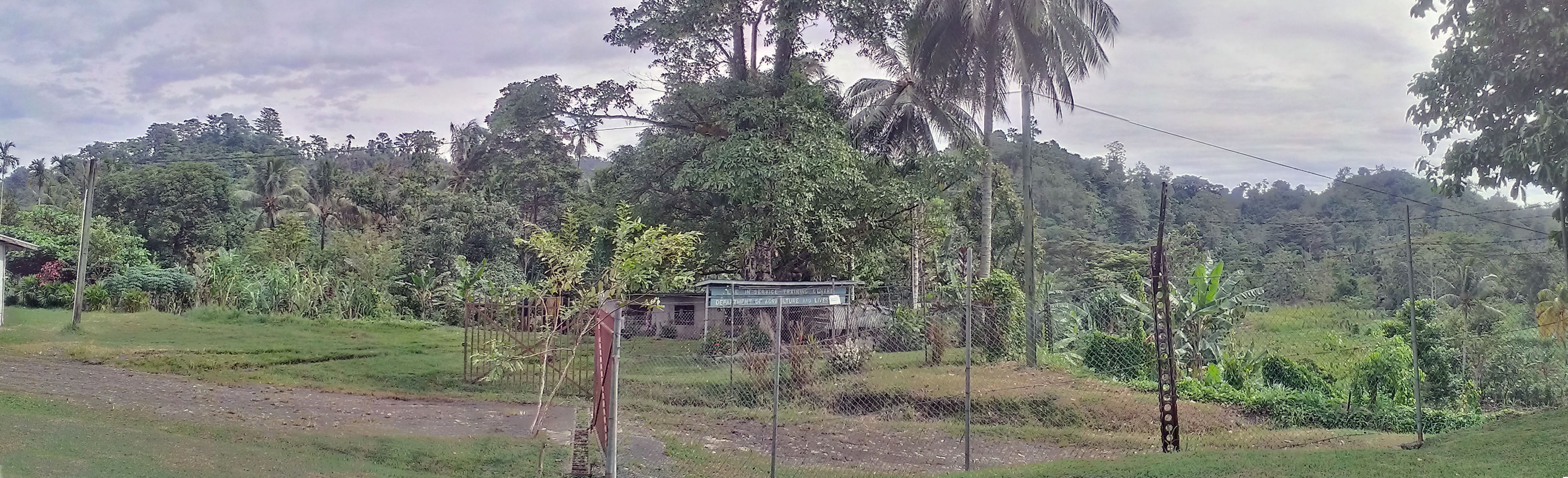
View facing East -front gate of the Lae in Service Training Centre on foothills of Atzera Range

=== Atzera Hills Project ===
In 1978 the Human Ecology Programme of the Department of Minerals and Energy, assisted by the UNEP and Unesco (Man and the Biosphere MAB Project 11) and in co-operation with the Lae City Council, instigated the Atzera Hills Project, described as an ecologically sound management system to arrest the rapid deterioration and loss of productive capacity of 600 ha of Atzera Hills.

The Atzera project folded after only three years despite efforts to train and raise awareness on the benefits of charcoal, the uptake in PNG households was minimal.

Heavy rains in 2005 resulted in the Morobe administration highlighting the vulnerability of the city to the weather and recommending that a major rehabilitation program be started immediately to reforest the surrounding hills behind the city to prevent soil erosion. This problem has been exacerbated as a result of the increased number of squatter settlements.

== Economy ==
The 3-Mile breeder unit is the first one established in Lae where work has focused on cross-breeding different varieties of chicken (Tok Pisin|Kakaruk).

The Department of Agriculture & Livestock exists to "enable the increase in agricultural production for domestic consumption and export, thus increasing the well being and contributing to social economic development". (Note: National Executive Council (NEC) Decision No.157/90) The Education & Training Branch manages the Animal Industry Centre and operates as an In-Service Co-ordination Centre for all courses conducted by the Department. The Animal Industry Centre is a quarantine station, regional store and base for the District Veterinary Officer. Theoretical training is given at Animal Industry In-service Training Center and practical work is carried out on cattle, pigs and poultry projects as well as the department's cattle breeding and research station at ERAPS.

== Law and order ==
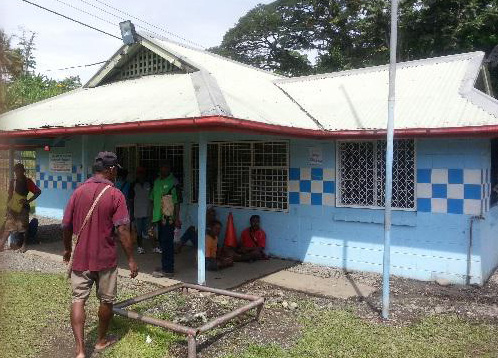
3 Mile Police Post of the Royal Papua New Guinea Constabulary

In October 2011, a group of teenagers from the Garaina area of Bulolo District engaged in a crime spree lasting three weeks. In retaliation, a gang of 30 men including 3-Mile community leaders retaliated by burning 25 houses belonging to the criminals, resulting in one suspected criminal's death.

In March 2013, a group of men attacked a family during a funeral and set fire to the coffin containing the deceased.

== Sport ==
The 3 Mile Brothers is a rugby league team and a contender in the country's biggest Rugby League Off-season Competition, The Coca Cola Ipatas Cup.
