= Flora Shaw Stewart =

Australian hotelier in Papua New Guinea

- Born: Flora Shaw Young; 28 August 1886; Fountainbridge, Edinburgh, Scotland
- Died: 13 May 1979 (aged 92); Lae, Papua New Guinea
- Occupation: Businesswoman
- Known for: Ownership of the Hotel Cecil in Lae
- Spouse(s): 1. Harry Gofton (1909-1918); 2. James Stewart (1929-1937)
- Children: Three

Flora Shaw Stewart (1886–1979), better known as 'Ma' Stewart, was a popular pioneering hotel owner in the Territory of Papua and the Territory of New Guinea (now Papua New Guinea) from 1920 until 1979.

== Early life ==
Flora Shaw Stewart was born on 28 August 1886 at Fountainbridge in Edinburgh, Scotland. She was the eldest of seven children. Her father, John Young, was a blacksmith. In 1888 her family migrated to Australia, living in Cooktown, Queensland. In 1906 her father took his family to the Territory of Papua as he was considering buying a hotel. Flora worked for five months as manageress of the Cosmopolitan Hotel in Samarai island in Papua in order to gain experience of the business. At that time, Samarai was a booming port that served as a stopover for Australian vessels heading to Asia. She returned with her family to Queensland in 1909. On 24 June 1909 she married Harry Gofton, a horse-dealer. Stewart had already developed a love of thoroughbred horses.

== Life in Papua ==
Stewart and her husband moved to Papua and lived on a rubber plantation for three years. In 1911, she had a son in Papua's capital, Port Moresby, and named him Moresby. In 1913, the couple went to the Vailala River area, in what is now the Gulf Province, to prospect for gold. She operated a store, kept chickens and pigs, and shot deer and crocodiles for meat and skins. When World War I broke out the couple returned to Australia and her husband enlisted in the First Australian Imperial Force. Flora returned to Port Moresby with her son and daughter. She worked in the drapery department of the Burns Philp store and later opened a guest house. Her husband died while fighting in France in 1918. Stewart moved to Samarai in 1920 to help her sister to run the Cosmopolitan Hotel. She bought the hotel in 1927. In 1929, in Samarai, she married James Stewart, a building foreman. They were to have a daughter.

== Life in Morobe ==
Stewart and her husband then moved to Salamaua on the north coast of New Guinea, a staging post for the goldfields area of Wau and Bulolo in the mountains of what is now Morobe Province. They quickly moved on to the goldfields and established the Hotel Bulolo, the first real hotel in the area, with room for 32 guests. She became known to all as 'Ma', and became the confidante and banker of numerous prospectors. Many were only able to carry on because of the loans she gave them, many of which were not repaid. She acted as a hairdresser and a nurse and, in the absence of a bank, often hid their gold under her bed. Not forgetting her love of horses, she raced them with considerable success and she and her husband organized races by shipping horses from Australia to Lae and then flying them up to the goldfields in Junkers airplanes, which were being used at the time to ferry large gold dredgers piece by piece. Racing ended in 1934 when evidence of doping and other malpractices emerged. Moving to Lae, now the second city of Papua New Guinea, she opened the Hotel Cecil in 1936. Among the many important visitors to pass through the hotel was the American pilot, Amelia Earhart, who stayed at the Cecil on the night before her departure on 2 July 1937, on her final flight. She was never seen again.

Stewart's husband was killed in a road accident in 1937 and her son, a bomber pilot in the Royal Air Force, was killed in action in 1940. In December 1941 she was evacuated urgently to Australia with her two daughters, just prior to the Japanese invasion. The Hotel Cecil, the Hotel Bulolo, and the racehorses were destroyed during the war. At the end of World War II, she returned to Lae as soon as possible, reputedly being the first civilian white woman allowed back into the territory. She took over some barracks and turned them into a temporary hotel, with rooms created by building flimsy partitions that did not reach to the floor or ceiling. She was finally allowed to rebuild the Hotel Cecil on its pre-war site in 1951 and she operated it until 1957. The hotel had 40 rooms. Stewart was clearly well-off. Reports from the Lae correspondent of Pacific Islands Monthly indicated that she took a six-week "world tour" by plane in 1951 and also visited London for the coronation of Elizabeth II in 1953, a trip that also included Spain. Stewart and her daughters also constructed a theatre/cinema, which opened in 1963. She was a founding member of the Morobe Agricultural Society and led the grand parade at its annual show until the end of her life.

== Death ==
Stewart died on 13 May 1979 in Lae and was buried in the local cemetery.
