= Mendi (disambiguation) =

Mendi is the capital of the Southern Highlands Province of Papua New Guinea.

Mendi may also refer to:

== People ==
- Mendi Rodan (1929–2009), Israeli conductor, composer and violinist
- Mendi Msimang, treasurer of the African National Congress
- Mendi Mengjiqi (born 1958), Kosovar Albanian composer
- Mendi Obadike (born 1973), Igbo Nigerian American musician, poet and conceptual artist

== Places ==
- Mendi Urban LLG, Papua New Guinea
- Lower Mendi Rural LLG, Papua New Guinea
- Upper Mendi Rural LLG, Papua New Guinea

== Ships ==
- SS Mendi, a 1905 British steamship used as troop carrier by the Royal Navy, sunk in 1917
- SAS Mendi (F148), a frigate of the South African Navy, launched 2003
- Mendi (barque), a black-owned ship serving Liberia

== Other ==
- The Mendi people of Sierra Leone, West Africa
  - The Mendi Bible, presented to John Quincy Adams by freed slaves from the Amistad
- Mendi language, also called Angal, spoken in Papua New Guinea and unrelated to the African people noted above
- Mendi, Ethiopia, a town
- Mehndi (or henna), used for body painting
- CD Mendi, a minor Spanish football club

== See also ==
- Mehndi (disambiguation)
