= List of World Heritage Sites in Papua New Guinea =

Location of the World Heritage Site in Papua New Guinea

The United Nations Educational, Scientific and Cultural Organization (UNESCO) designates World Heritage Sites, listing places of outstanding universal value to cultural or natural heritage. These must be nominated by countries which are signatories to the UNESCO World Heritage Convention, established in 1972. Cultural heritage consists of monuments (such as architectural works, monumental sculptures, or inscriptions), groups of buildings, and sites (including archaeological sites). Natural features (consisting of physical and biological formations), geological and physiographical formations (including habitats of threatened species of animals and plants), and natural sites which are important from the point of view of science, conservation or natural beauty, are defined as natural heritage.

Papua New Guinea accepted the convention on 28 July 1997. Responsibility for managing any sites was assigned to the Department of Environment and Conservation in 2005. The country's single World Heritage Site, the Kuk Early Agricultural Site, was inscribed as a cultural site in 2008. Seven sites have been included on the tentative list since 2006. A 2015 review of the tentative sites found that only four had well-defined boundaries, and that protective measures in all tentative sites had not significantly progressed since 2006. Only the Trans-Fly Complex site was considered ready for a formal nomination, and of the others only the Huon Terraces site could be easily readied for such a nomination.

While many of the tentative listings, as well as the Kuk Early Agricultural Site, were initially proposed by foreign individuals and governments, the listings have gained national government support. The nomination documents of the Kuk Early Agricultural Site were prepared by a foreign academic, but this was greatly supported by a Papua New Guinean academic who obtained the support of local communities. This local support has not been integrated into national management plans. Local support also exists for the Kokoda Track and Nakanai Mountains (part of The Sublime Karsts of Papua New Guinea tentative site) nominations. National conservation areas remain under the traditional custodianship of local communities. Local communities are strong enough that any national conservation efforts would be highly dependent on local cooperation. The Kawelka people, the traditional owners of the Kuk site, saw potential economic benefits to a World Heritage listing, as well as prestige and a reinforcement of their link to the land. The management plan developed for that site was thought to be one of the first in the world to be based on traditional land-use practices. It aimed to require minimal financial support and national government intervention, to reduce the risk to the site of changing provincial or national politics.

== World Heritage Sites ==
UNESCO lists sites under ten criteria; each entry must meet at least one of the criteria. Criteria i through vi are cultural, and vii through x are natural.

World Heritage Sites
Site	Image	Location (province)	Year listed	UNESCO data	Description
Kuk Early Agricultural Site	Aerial photograph showing a landscape with visibly worked fields	Western Highlands Province	2008	887; iii, iv (cultural)	The Kuk Early Agricultural Site is a 116-hectare (290-acre) area of swamp in the New Guinea Highlands, around 1,500 metres (4,900 ft) above sea-level. Archaeological excavations have found evidence of continuous human habitation for between 7,000 and 10,000 years. This includes 6,500 years ago, when agriculture was developed in New Guinea. Archaeological finds have provided evidence of changes in agricultural practices, including the digging of ditches and the creation of drainage systems, evidencing the independent development of agriculture.

== Tentative list ==
In addition to sites inscribed on the World Heritage List, member states can maintain a list of tentative sites that they may consider for nomination. Nominations for the World Heritage List are only accepted if the site was previously listed on the tentative list. Papua New Guinea lists seven properties on its tentative list.

Tentative Sites
Site	Image	Location (province)	Year listed	UNESCO criteria	Description
Huon Terraces - Stairway to the Past		Morobe Province	2006	iii, v, vii, viii, ix, x (mixed)	The Huon Peninsula lies in a complex geological area formed by the collision of the Indo-Australian plate with the Pacific plate. The peninsula is being forced upwards due to subduction, and this process has created a series of coastal terraces that preserve perhaps 300,000 years of geological history. Volcanic ash overlaying the area has contributed to the preservation of these terraces. The area is important for coastal fisheries, as well as for its forests, which contain unique species such as the Matschie's tree-kangaroo. The site is similar to Desembarco del Granma National Park in Cuba, which also has a series of coastal terraces.
Kikori River Basin / Great Papuan Plateau		Gulf Province, Southern Highlands Province, Western Highlands Province	2006	iii, iv, v, vii, viii, ix, x (mixed)	The area covered by the Great Papuan Plateau and parts of the Kikori River basin holds one of the largest undisturbed tracts of forest in the Southern Hemisphere. Due to the area's rugged landscape, its forests are highly diverse, ranging from montane ecosystems to mangrove forests. Included within this diversity are parts of the Central Range montane rain forests and Southern New Guinea lowland rain forests ecoregions. The proposed area supports significant bird diversity, and includes two designated Endemic Bird Areas. The site also contains three Centres of Plant Diversity, the Ramsar Convention-listed Lake Kutubu, and geologically noteworthy areas such as Mount Bosavi and the Darai limestone formation. Around 60,000 people from at least 16 ethnic groups live in the area, and a number of archaeological sites showcase their unique cultures. Oil and natural gas development creates some risks for the area's natural heritage.
Kokoda Track and Owen Stanley Ranges	People walking along a small dirt track	Central Province, Oro Province	2006	iii, v, vi, vii, x (mixed)	The Owen Stanley Range hosts a large variety of natural ecosystems, including parts of the Southeastern Papuan rain forests ecoregion. The proposed protected portion of the range includes the Managalas plateau, Mount Victoria, and Mount Albert Edward. The site hosts one Centre of Plant Diversity, which alone has at least 4,000 plant species, and one Endemic Bird Area, which supports 510 bird species (around two-thirds of those known in New Guinea). The Laloki river supports migratory birds. The Kokoda Track passes through this region, and is protected due to its importance in the Second World War. The track now serves as an important tourism site.
Milne Bay Seascape (Pacific Jewels of Marine Biodiversity)	Aerial photograph of a coral atoll of a small number of tiny islands and shallow water forming a circle around a central lagoon	Milne Bay Province	2006	iii, v, vii, viii, ix, x (mixed)	Five sites are included in this proposal, each covering islands and atolls within Milne Bay and some of the sea surrounding them. The coral reefs in this area are highly biodiverse and lie within the Coral Triangle. Key species include large animals such as sea turtles, humphead wrasse, and whale sharks. Culturally important sites include Samarai island, a former provincial capital that was important during the colonial period, and a number of shipwrecks.
The Sublime Karsts of Papua New Guinea		East New Britain Province, Southern Highlands Province, Western Province	2006	v, vii, viii, ix, x (mixed)	This proposal includes the Nakanai Mountains on the island of New Britain, the Muller Plateau in the New Guinea Highlands, and the Hindenburg Wall feature of the Hindenburg Range. These are all mostly uninhabited karst landscapes.
Trans-Fly Complex	A river flowing through flat grassland and forest	Western Province	2006	v, vi, x (mixed)	The Trans-Fly area is a relatively flat landscape, extending along the southern coast of New Guinea and crossing the border between Papua New Guinea and Indonesia. It includes wetlands, savanna, and seasonal tropical forests. The area is highly biodiverse, and supports half of Papua New Guinea's known bird species. It has one Endemic Bird Area and one Centre of Plant Diversity. Some of the region is protected through the Tonda Wildlife Management Area and other smaller protected areas. The people living in the Papua New Guinean and Indonesian portions of this region share cultural ties. The proposal considers establishing a transboundary heritage site with Indonesia, and possibly links with the nearby Kakadu World Heritage Site in Australia, which marks a similar ecosystem.
Upper Sepik River Basin	Aerial photograph of the mouth of the Sepik river, with colouration indicating sediment is flowing into the ocean	East Sepik Province, Sandaun Province	2006	i, iii, iv, v, vii, viii, ix, x (mixed)	The Sepik river flows between the New Guinea Highlands, the Torricelli Range, and the Prince Alexander Mountains. The area forms a large and mostly unpolluted river basin with over 1,500 lakes and wetland areas. There are no dams or other significant river interruptions. The basin is highly biodiverse, containing three Endemic Bird Areas and three Centres of Plant Diversity. Threatened bird species present include the Papuan eagle, Victoria crowned pigeon, and northern cassowary. The Telefomin District may have the world's highest marsupial diversity. An estimated 430,000 people lived in the river basin at the time of the tentative listing, speaking over 300 languages. The Haus Tambaran traditional architecture comes from this region.
