= Kaugel =

Kaugel may refer to:

- Kaugel River
- Kaugel language
