= Ipili language =

Language of Enga Province, Papua New Guinea

Ipili
- Native to: Papua New Guinea
- Region: Enga Province
- Native speakers: 26,000 (2002)
- Language family: Engan: North Engan; Ipili

Language codes
- ISO 639-3: ipi
- Glottolog: ipil1240

Ipili is an Engan language of the East New Guinea Highlands in Enga Province, Papua New Guinea. The name of the language means 'salt-people' in Huli language. There are 26,000 Ipili speakers.

There are two dialects, Porgera-Paiela and Tipinini. The latter is similar to Enga. Missionary Terrance Borchard guided translation of the New Testament in the Paiela dialect. Working with the Ipili tribe they developed an alphabet and written language, previously spoken. He began the work in 1969 until his death in Aug. 2014. Literacy work resulted.

== Phonology ==
Vowels
	Front	Central	Back
High	i		u
Mid	e		o
Low		a	

Consonants
Type	Labial	Alveolar	Palatal	Velar
Plosive	p, mb	t, nd	nj	k, ng
Nasal	m	n		
Fricative		s		
Liquid	w	l	y	

Ipili has five vowels (/a, e, i, o, u/) and thirteen consonants (/p, t, k, mb, nd, nj, ŋg, m, n, s, l, y, w/). It is reported that Ipili may have tonal contrasts.

In Ipili consonant clusters do not occur.

=== Morphophonology ===
Progressive assimilation and regressive assimilation can be found in Ipili.

Ipili has vowel height harmony, where high and mid vowels are rarely adjacent to each other. By contrast, the low vowel 'a' can be adjacent to any vowel, and thus the word mugalo 'a variety of bamboo', which contains either high and mid vowel, is found.

== Grammar ==
=== Verbs ===
Ipili verbs are inflected for tense, mood, aspect, person and number by suffixation. These suffixes are classified into two groups, tense suffixes and person suffixes. A person suffix is preceded by a tense suffix.

There are three grammatical numbers: singular, dual and plural. Verbs are also inflected by three persons, but second and third person are not distinguished in the dual and plural.

There are a number of tenses and aspects, like a present tense, three past tenses and two future tenses.

=== Syntax ===
The basic word order is subject-object-verb. Ipili clauses thus place the finite verb in the final position.

== Literature ==
Ipili people have traditional sung tales called tindi. The content may contain something magical.

== See also ==
- Porgera Gold Mine
