= Kobon language =

Language of Papua New Guinea

Kobon
- Pronunciation: [xombon], [k͡xombon], [kʰombon]
- Native to: Papua New Guinea
- Region: Madang Province, Middle Ramu District, and Western Highlands Province on Kaironk River in lower Jimi River area north of Mt. Hagen
- Native speakers: 10,000 (2007); 4,000 monolinguals (2007?)
- Language family: Trans–New Guinea: Madang; Rai Coast–Kalam; Kalam; Kalam–Kobon; Kobon
- Writing system: Latin

Language codes
- ISO 639-3: kpw
- Glottolog: kobo1249

Kobon (pronounced [xombon], [k͡xombon] or [kʰombon]) is a language of Papua New Guinea. It has somewhere around 90–120 verbs.

Kobon has a pandanus language, spoken when harvesting karuka.

== Geographic distribution ==
Kobon is spoken in Madang Province and Western Highlands Province, north of Mount Hagen.

== Phonology ==
=== Vowels ===
Monophthongal vowels are /i e ɨ ə a o u/, diphthongs are /ai̯ au̯/. /i/ and /u/ may be [jɪ] and [wʊ~ʍʊ] word-initially. /ɨ/ ([ɨ~ɯ]) is written ⟨ü⟩ and /ə/ ([ɜ~ɘ~ɪ]) is written ⟨ö⟩.

Only /i a u/ and the diphthongs occur word-initially, apart from the quotative particle, which is variably /a~e~o~ö/. /e o/ occur syllable-initially within a word. All vowels (including the diphthongs) occur syllable-medially (in CVC syllables), syllable-finally and at the ends of words. Many vowel sequences occur, including some with identical vowels.

=== Consonants ===
Kobon distinguishes an alveolar lateral /l/, a palatal lateral /ʎ/, a subapical retroflex lateral flap /𝼈 / (ɭ̆ ), and a fricative trill /r̝/, though the frication on the latter is variable.

Kobon consonants and their allophones
		Labial	Alveolar	Palatal	Velar	Pharyngeal
Nasal		m ⟨m⟩	n ⟨n⟩	ɲ ⟨ñ⟩	ŋ ⟨ŋ⟩	
Obstruent	lenis	mb [p~b~mb~mpʰ] ⟨b⟩	nd [tʰ~d~nd~ntʰ] ⟨d⟩	ndʑ [dʑ~ɲdʑ~ɲtɕ] ⟨j⟩	ŋɡ [k~ɡ~ɣ~ŋɡ~ŋkʰ] ⟨g⟩	
Obstruent	fortis	f [f~ɸ~β~v~ʋ~p̚] ⟨p⟩	s ⟨s⟩	tɕ [tɕ~dʑ] ⟨c⟩	x [kʰ~kx~x~ɣ] ⟨k⟩	
Lateral			l [l~ɬ] ⟨l⟩	ʎ ⟨ɫ⟩		
Rhotic			r [ɾ̝̊~ɾ̥~ɾ~r̝̊~r̥~r] ⟨r⟩	𝼈 [ɭ~ɽ~ɽ̊] ⟨ƚ⟩		
Approximant		w ⟨w⟩		j ⟨y⟩		ħ [h] ⟨h⟩

Voiced obstruents may be prenasalized after vowels, depending on the preceding consonant, and are voiceless word-initially. Liquids other than /ʎ/ tend toward final devoicing. For example, final /d/ is [ntʰ] and final /l/ tends to [ɬ]. (/w/ and /j/ do not occur in final position, while nasals and /ʎ/ retain voicing.) Voiceless consonants other than /s/ and /h/ are optionally voiced between vowels.

⟨ƚ⟩ is sublaminal retroflex. It has been described as a lateral flap, [𝼈 ].

All consonants occur syllable initially, though /ŋ/ only occurs word-initially in a single mimetic word. All consonants but /h j w/ occur syllable- and word-finally. Clusters occur in many (C)VC.CV(C) words, as well as initially in a handful of mostly monosyllabic CCV(C) words. Attested initial clusters are /bɽ, xɽ, fr, xl/.

Kobon positional allophones
	word-initially	intervocalically	word-finally
⟨r⟩	ɾ̥~ɾ̝̊	ɾ~r	ɾ̥~ɾ̝̊~r̥~r̝̊~ɾ~r
⟨ƚ⟩	ɽ		ɭ~ɽ~ɽ̊
⟨l⟩	l		ɬ~l
⟨k⟩	kʰ~k͜x~x also ɣ intervocalically		
⟨p⟩	ɸ~f	β~ʋ (occas. v)	ɸ~p̚
⟨c⟩	t͡ɕ	t͡ɕ~d͡ʑ	t͡ɕ
⟨g⟩	ɡ~k	ɡ~ɣ, ŋ͡ɡ	ŋ͡kʰ
⟨j⟩	d͡ʑ	d͡ʑ, ɲ͡d͡ʑ	ɲ͡t͡ɕ
⟨d⟩	d	d, n͜d	n͜tʰ (occas. tʰ)
⟨b⟩	b (occas. p)	b, m͜b	m͡pʰ

Intervocalically, the lenis obstruents are oral [b d dʑ ɡ~ɣ] when a nasal or another lenis obstruent occurs in the preceding syllable, and are prenasalized [mb nd ɲdʑ ŋɡ] otherwise, with some variability after /h/. They are often oral in a medial cluster after another consonant. Otherwise the allophones in the table above are largely in free variation.

== Writing system ==
Kobon has been written in the Latin alphabet for over 30 years. The special letters ƚ and ɫ are used for the subapical retroflex lateral flap and palatal lateral, respectively.

a b c d e g h i j k l ƚ ɫ m n ñ ŋ o ö p r s u ü w y

5–15% of Kobon speakers are literate.

== Grammar ==
Kobon is a subject–object–verb language. Singular, dual, and plural are distinguished in personal pronouns and kinship terminology.

Like the other Kalam languages, Kobon is famous for having a closed set of very small number of verbs—perhaps less than 120 for the entire language. These verbs are combined other verbs, in serial verb constructions, and with nouns into phrases with specific meanings, much as one says "have dinner" rather than "dine" in English.

This makes for an interesting window into semantics. One might expect that with a very limited set of verbs, their meanings would be quite general as have, do, be and go are in English. To a certain extent this is really the case, as there is for example only one verb of perception. That is, the same verb is used for see, hear, taste, smell, feel (both physically and emotionally), think, and understand (compare with "I see" for "I understand" in English). Another verb is used for making sound, whether it's speaking, singing, praying, crying, twigs breaking, rocks clattering, or water gurgling. However, some Kobon verbs are quite specific. There is one exception for sound; for example, there is a specific verb for calling a pig. There are also three verbs of pouring, depending on whether the thing being poured is solid, liquid, or food; and there is even a verb that means to quarter a cassowary.
