= Erave =

Erave may refer to:

- Erave language
- The Erave dialect of the Kewa language
- Erave, a settlement in Kagua-Erave District, Papua New Guinea
