= LEQ =

LEQ or Leq may refer to:

- Land's End Airport's IATA code
- Lembena language's ISO 639-3 code
- L_{eq} or equivalent continuous sound level, see Sound level meter#LAT or Leq: Equivalent continuous sound level
- Long essay question, a type of question on some Advanced Placement exams

== See also ==
- Less than or equal to, encoded as leq in some schemes
