= MDU =

The initials MDU may refer to:

- Mains distribution unit, electrical device
- Maharishi Dayanand University in Rohtak, Haryana, India
- Manchester Debating Union
- McGill Debating Union, a student-run debating society at McGill University.
- Medical Defence Union, medical defence organisation providing legal support should its members' clinical competence be questioned
- Methylene diurea, a chemical compound
- Military Democratic Union (Unión Militar Democrática), clandestine Spanish organisation of military officers in the late- and post-Franco era.
- MingDao University, a university in Changhua County, Taiwan
- MDU Resources (Montana-Dakota Utilities), American diversified energy company
- Multi-dwelling unit, classification of housing
- MDU, IATA airport code of Mendi Airport in Papua New Guinea
- MDU, Indian Railways station code of Madurai Junction railway station in Tamil Nadu, India
