= Nembi Plateau Rural LLG =

Local-level government in Papua New Guinea

- Country: Papua New Guinea
- Province: Southern Highlands Province
- Time zone: UTC+10 (AEST)

Nembi Plateau Rural LLG is a local-level government (LLG) of Southern Highlands Province, Papua New Guinea. The Nembi language is spoken in the LLG.

== Wards ==
- 01. Hupa 1
- 02. Hupa 2
- 03. Embi 1
- 04. Embi 2
- 05. Pomberal 1
- 06. Pomberal 2
- 07. Topua 1
- 08. Topua 2
- 09. Karemela 1
- 10. Askam 1
- 11. Askam 2
- 12. Tegipo 1
- 13. Tegipo 2
- 14. Enjua 1
- 15. Enjua 2
- 16. Hulal 1
- 17. Hulal 2
- 18. Pinja 1
- 19. Pinja 2
- 20. Semin 1
- 21. Semin 2
- 22. Sipera 1
- 23. Sipera 2
- 24. Sipera 3
- 25. Sop Mul
- 26. Hupa 3
