= Mendi =

Capital of Southern Highlands, Papua New Guinea

- Location within Papua New Guinea
- Coordinates: 6°8′52″S 143°39′26″E
- Country: Papua New Guinea
- Province: Southern Highlands
- District: Mendi-Munihu District
- LLG: Mendi Urban LLG
- Elevation: 1,620 m (5,310 ft)

Population (2013)
  - Total: 56,055
  - Rank: 10th

Languages
  - Main languages: Tok Pisin, Angal, Kewa
  - Traditional language: Angal
- Time zone: UTC+10 (AEST)
- Postcode: 251
- Climate: Cfb

Mendi, Papua New Guinea, is the provincial capital of the Southern Highlands Province, and the capital of Mendi-Munihu District. The Lai River flows by the town. It is served by Mendi Airport. The town falls under Mendi Urban LLG.

== Geography ==
The town is located in the Mendi River Valley, 1,675 metres or 5,495 feet above sea level, on the limestone hills from west to east. The Kikori River originates from the mountainous area where Mendi is located, and the Erave and Strickland rivers flow through the Giluwe Mountains, which contain the second highest peak of Papua New Guinea.

== Climate ==
The Köppen-Geiger climate classification system classifies its climate as a subtropical highland climate (Cfb). Mendi features cool mornings, warm afternoons and heavy rainfall throughout the year.

Climate data for Mendi
Month	Jan	Feb	Mar	Apr	May	Jun	Jul	Aug	Sep	Oct	Nov	Dec	Year
Mean daily maximum °C (°F)	23.8 (74.8)	23.6 (74.5)	23.4 (74.1)	23.6 (74.5)	23.6 (74.5)	22.6 (72.7)	21.9 (71.4)	22.3 (72.1)	22.7 (72.9)	23.3 (73.9)	23.7 (74.7)	23.7 (74.7)	23.2 (73.7)
Daily mean °C (°F)	18.3 (64.9)	18.3 (64.9)	18.2 (64.8)	18.2 (64.8)	18.2 (64.8)	17.1 (62.8)	16.8 (62.2)	17.2 (63.0)	17.5 (63.5)	17.6 (63.7)	17.8 (64.0)	18.2 (64.8)	17.8 (64.0)
Mean daily minimum °C (°F)	12.8 (55.0)	13.1 (55.6)	13.1 (55.6)	12.8 (55.0)	12.8 (55.0)	11.7 (53.1)	11.8 (53.2)	12.1 (53.8)	12.4 (54.3)	12 (54)	11.9 (53.4)	12.7 (54.9)	12.4 (54.4)
Average rainfall mm (inches)	239 (9.4)	261 (10.3)	286 (11.3)	246 (9.7)	209 (8.2)	192 (7.6)	211 (8.3)	244 (9.6)	263 (10.4)	270 (10.6)	221 (8.7)	252 (9.9)	2,894 (114)
Source: Climate-Data.org, altitude: 1,740 metres (5,710 ft)

== Economy ==
Mendi's population is dense and the economy is relatively good. Crops grown in the town and its surrounding areas include vegetables, coffee, and tea; there is also a sawmill in the town. Mendi is mostly dependent on air transport, though there is road access through the nearby town of Mount Hagen.

== 2018 State of Emergency ==
In June 2018, a regional court in Mendi ruled against a losing candidate's challenge to a provincial election. Rioting followed, with looting and arson, including to a Link PNG plane at the regional airport. The central government of Papua New Guinea declared a state of emergency, suspended the Southern Highlands provincial government, and sent over 200 Defence Force troops to maintain order. The state of emergency lasted for 9 months.

== See also ==
- Mendi Urban LLG
- Upper Mendi Rural LLG
