= Samberigi language =

Engan language of Papua New Guinea

Samberigi
- Sau
- Region: Southern Highlands, Papua New Guinea
- Native speakers: (3,130 cited 1981)
- Language family: Engan: South; Samberigi

Language codes
- ISO 639-3: ssx
- Glottolog: samb1321

Samberigi, or Sau, is an Engan language of the Southern Highlands province of Papua New Guinea.
