= Big man (anthropology) =

Anthropological term for influential person in Melanesian and Polynesian tribes

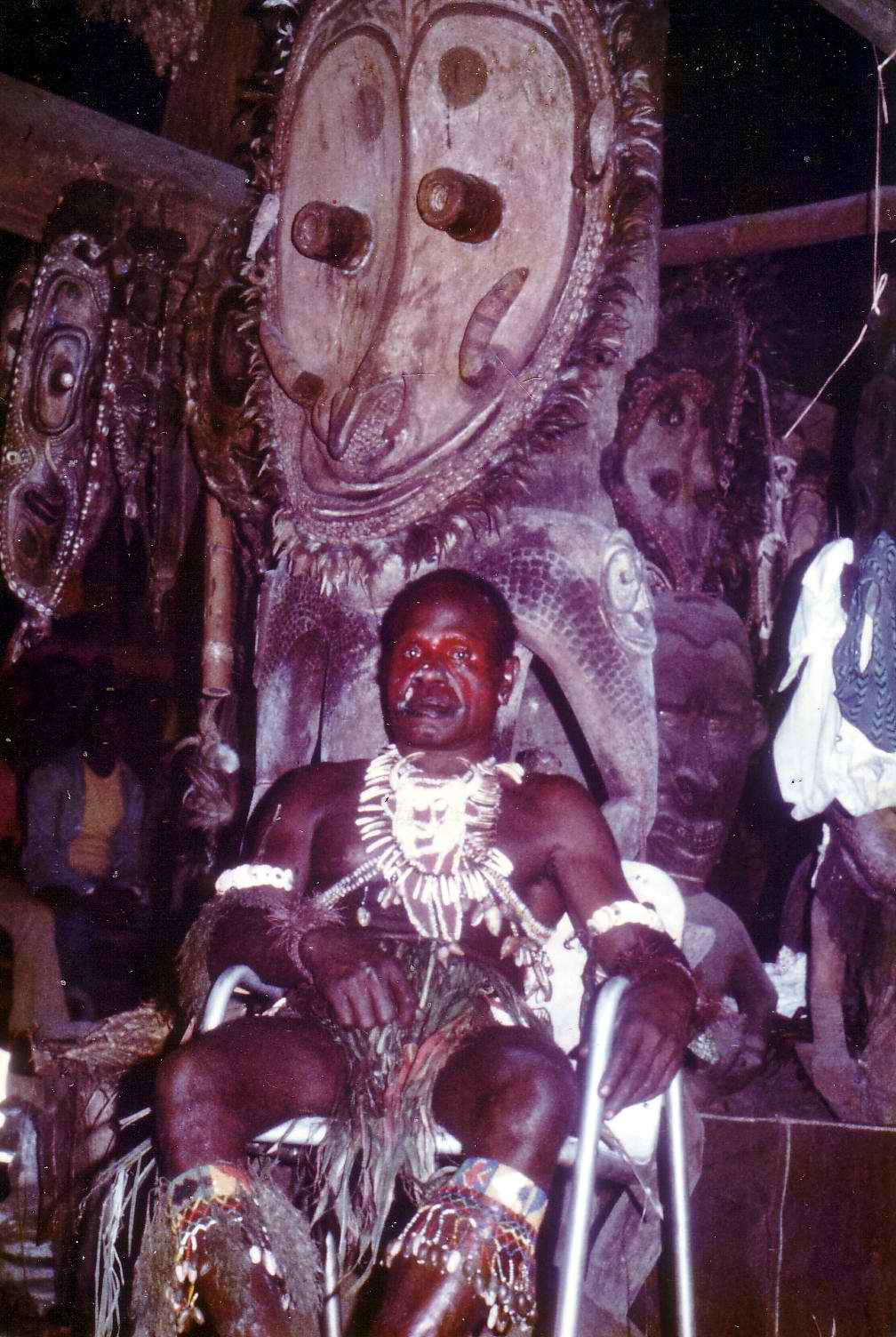
Sepik River chief, Korogo Village, Sepik River, PNG, 1975.

A big man is a highly influential individual in a tribe, especially in Melanesia and Polynesia. Such a person may not have formal tribal or other authority (though, for instance, material possessions or inheritance of rights), but can maintain recognition through skilled persuasion and wisdom. The big man has a large following, both from his clan and from other clans. He provides his followers with protection and economic assistance, in return receiving support which he uses to increase his status.

== Big man "system" ==
The American anthropologist Marshall Sahlins studied the big man phenomenon. In his much-referenced 1963 article "Poor Man, Rich Man, Big Man, Chief: Political Types in Melanesia", Sahlins uses analytically constructed ideal-types of hierarchy and equality to compare a larger-scale Polynesian-type hierarchical society of chiefs and sub-chiefs with a Melanesian-type big-man system.

The latter consists of segmented lineage groups, locally held together by faction-leaders who compete for power in the social structure of horizontally arranged and principally equal groupings (factions). Here, leadership is not ascribed, but rather gained through action and competition "with other ambitious men".

== In Papua New Guinea ==
The first use of the term may be found in the English translation of Dreißig Jahre in der Südsee (1907) by Richard Parkinson. The term is often found in historical works dealing with Papua New Guinea. Andrew Strathern applies the concept of big-men to a community in Mount Hagen, Papua New Guinea.

Traditionally, among peoples of non-Austronesian-speaking communities, authority was obtained by a man (the so-called "big man") recognised as "performing most capably in social, political, economic and ceremonial activities". His function was not to command, but to influence his society through his example. He was expected to act as a negotiator with neighbouring groups and to redistribute food (generally produced by his wives) periodically. In this sense, he was seen as ensuring the well-being of his community.

Such a system is still found in many parts of Papua New Guinea, and other parts of Melanesia.

== See also ==
- Big man (political science) – Corrupt, autocratic leader
- Cult of personality – Idolization of a leader
- Elder (administrative title) – Person with authority over others
- Gothi – Priest or tribal Scandinavian leader
- Great man theory – Approach to the study of history
- Moka exchange – Ritualized system of exchange in the Mount Hagen area, Papua New Guinea
- Monarchy – Form of government ruled by a monarch, or a polity with this form of government
- Political strongman – Authoritarian political leader
- Rom baro – Romani tribal leader
- Ulmen (Mapuche)
