= Moka exchange =

Ritualized system of exchange in the Mount Hagen area, Papua New Guinea

The Moka is a highly ritualized system of exchange in the Mount Hagen area, Papua New Guinea, that has become emblematic of the anthropological concepts of "gift economy" and of "Big man" political system. Moka are reciprocal gifts of pigs through which social status is achieved. Moka refers specifically to the increment in the size of the gift; giving more brings greater prestige to the giver. However, reciprocal gift giving was confused by early anthropologists with profit-seeking, as the lending and borrowing of money at interest.

This gift exchange system was analyzed by anthropologist Marshall Sahlins as a means of distinguishing between the exchange principles of reciprocity and redistribution on the one hand, and the associated political principles of status and rank on the other. Sahlins used this example to contrast the regional political differences between the status-based "Big man" political system of Melanesia that engage in gift exchange, with the socially ranked "Chiefly" political systems of Polynesia associated with redistributive systems.

Since making this comparison, the Moka system has been the subject of extensive debate on the nature of the gift, and of so-called "gift economies". It has become a staple of classroom discussion as a result of the ethnographic film Ongka's Big Moka, which documents one Moka cycle in the early 1970s.

== Gifts and prestige: the 'Big man'/'Rubbish man' continuum ==
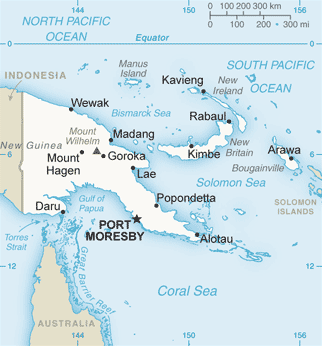
Mt. Hagen, Papua New Guinea

Social status in the 'Big man' political system is the result of giving larger gifts than one has received. These gifts are of a limited range of goods, primarily pigs and scarce pearl shells from the coast. To return the same amount as one has received in a moka is simply the repayment of a debt, strict reciprocity. Moka is the extra. To some, this represents interest on an investment. However, one is not bound to provide moka, only to repay the debt. One adds moka to the gift to increase one's prestige, and to place the receiver in debt. This constant renewal of the debt relationship keeps the relationship alive. A debt fully paid ends further interaction. Giving more than one receives establishes a reputation as a Big man, whereas the simple repayment of debt, or failure to fully repay, pushes one's reputation towards the other end of the scale, Rubbish man.

Big men are the preferred people to give gifts to, since one has a reasonable chance of repayment with extra. Gift-giving is not altruistic. The extra one receives back can be re-gifted to others, increasing the number of exchange partners, and building a wider network. This wider network returns even more, growing both network size and gift value. Giving a gift to a rubbish man is a waste, since they cannot repay their debt with moka ("interest"). Gift-giving thus becomes a competition between a limited number of high-status men, each of whom tries to give bigger gifts than they received. The networks can grow to encompass several hundred men, each competing with the others, to give the biggest gift to a competitor.

The expansion in size of gift and counter-gift, and of the political network it creates, eventually reaches its upper limit set by the carrying capacity of the land, and the ability of followers to husband the pigs. When a Big man is finally unable to repay a gift with moka, he is defeated; however, the winning competitor is now without the "extra" he requires to repay his gifts to his followers, and his reputation also suffers and the expansive network that had been built up starts to crumble. Other Big men now take advantage and the competition for supremacy begins again.

In the documentary Ongka's Big Moka, Ongka must try three times before he succeeds in staging his Moka. His gift consists of a truck, 600 pigs, AU$10,000, 8 cows, and 12 cassowaries.

== Reciprocity vs. redistribution ==
On a very general view, the array of economic transactions in the ethnographic record may be resolved into two types. First, those "vice-versa" movements between two parties known familiarly as 'reciprocity.' The second, centralized movements: collection from members of a group, often under one hand, and redivision with this group. This is 'pooling' or 'redistribution'. On an even more general view, the two types merge. For pooling is an organization of reciprocities, a system of reciprocities - a fact of central bearing on the genesis of large scale redistribution under chiefly aegis.

Sahlins used the example of Moka to distinguish between the principles of reciprocity and redistribution. Reciprocity is a dyadic exchange relationship that can be characterized, imprecisely, as gift-giving. Moka exchange is between two individuals, each of whom aims to give more than they receive. It is thus unlike profit seeking, though that does not make it a gift in the standard sense of the word. Moka exchange is not altruistic. One gives gifts to potential enemies to establish a relationship by placing them in debt. For a relationship to persist, there must be a delay between gift and counter-gift—one or the other party must always be in debt or there is no relationship. Without this debt relationship, there is no reciprocity. This is what distinguishes moka from a "true gift" given with no expectation of return (something Sahlins calls 'generalized reciprocity'). Exchange without expectation of reciprocity is frequently defined as generalized exchange.

Redistribution, in contrast, involves the collection of tribute (e.g. tax) by a legitimate authority, who re-allocates it to members of the group. Sahlins refers to this as "pooling". Reciprocity and redistribution are associated by Sahlins with two different types of political system. Reciprocal exchanges, as in Moka, give the Big Man political system its shape. Political relationships are crafted out of the sense of debt created by a Moka gift. The Big Man has influence, but cannot command. Redistribution is common in the chiefly polities of Polynesia, such as Hawai'i, Tonga, and Fiji where those of rank can demand tribute, which they redistribute to their followers.

== Status vs. rank ==
Karl Polanyi emphasized that economic exchange in non-market societies is "embedded" in other social institutions. There is no distinct economic system. Exchanges such as Moka have both economic, kin, religious and political aspects; they must be analyzed holistically, in terms of the institutions (such as Moka) in which it is embedded. Gift exchange thus has a political effect; granting prestige or status to one, and a sense of debt in the other. A political system can be built out of these kinds of status relationships. Sahlins characterizes the difference between status and rank by highlighting that Big man is not a role, but a status shared by many. The Big man is "not a prince OF men", but a "prince among men". The Big man system is based on the ability to persuade, rather than command. It is laboriously built up, yet is highly unstable and inevitably collapses.

The redistributive exchanges found in the Polynesian islands, in contrast, are embedded in a kinship system based on rank. Those who are junior kinsmen are obligated to obey those who are first born. Families of the first born are acknowledged as superior to families of the junior kinsmen, leading to the development of an aristocracy that can command tribute, which they redistribute among followers. The chiefly system is much more stable.

== Gifts and commodities ==
Some anthropologists have contrasted "gift economies" from "market economies" as polar opposites, thereby implying that non-market exchange was always altruistic. This opposition was classically expressed by Chris Gregory in his book "Gifts and Commodities" (1982). Gregory argued that:

"Commodity exchange is an exchange of alienable objects between people who are in a state of reciprocal independence that establishes a quantitative relationship between the objects exchanged… Gift exchange is an exchange of inalienable objects between people who are in a state of reciprocal dependence that establishes a qualitative relationship between the transactors" (emphasis added.)

Gregory contrasts gift and commodity exchange according to five criteria:

Commodity exchange	Gift exchange
immediate exchange	delayed exchange
alienable goods	inalienable goods
actors independent	actors dependent
quantitative relationship	qualitative relationship
between objects	between people

Other anthropologists, however, refused to see these different "exchange spheres" as such polar opposites. Marilyn Strathern, writing on a similar area in Papua New Guinea, dismissed the utility of the opposition in "The Gender of the Gift" (1988).

== See also ==
- Ongka's Big Moka a 1 hr documentary film about Moka made for England's Granada TV's Disappearing World series: dir Charlie Nairn
- Potlatch, a similar practice among some First Nations/Native American peoples of west coast North America
- Kula, a similar practice in the Trobriand Islands, Papua New Guinea
- Sepik Coast exchange, a similar practice in the Sepik Coast of Papua New Guinea

== Bibliography ==
- Strathern, Andrew. 1971. The Rope of Moka. Cambridge: Cambridge University Press.
- "Ongka's Big Moka: The Kawelka of Papua New Guinea" (DVD) 1976: England's Granada TV's Disappearing World series: dir Charlie Nairn
