= AKH =

Akh or AKH may refer to:

- Akh, the ancient Egyptian concept of a soul
- Angal language, a language spoken in Papua New Guinea, by ISO 639 code
- Gastonia Municipal Airport, Gastonia, North Carolina, U.S., by FAA code
- Prince Sultan Air Base, by IATA code
- Vienna General Hospital, Vienna, Austria
