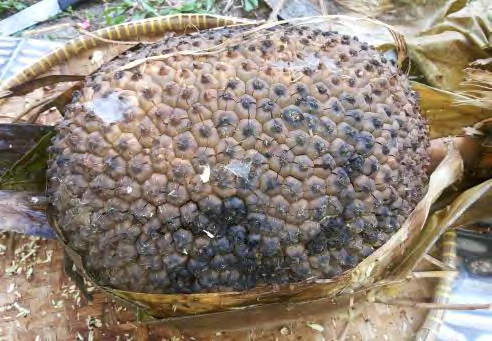
- Pandanus julianettii fruit cluster

Scientific classification
- Kingdom: Plantae
- Clade: Tracheophytes
- Clade: Angiosperms
- Clade: Monocots
- Order: Pandanales
- Family: Pandanaceae
- Genus: Pandanus
- Subgenus: Pandanus subg. Lophostigma
- Section: Pandanus sect. Karuka
- Species: P. julianettii

Binomial name
- Pandanus julianettii Martelli

Synonyms
- Pandanus jiulianetti Martelli

= Karuka =

Species of tree and regional food crop

Karuka nuts (kernels)
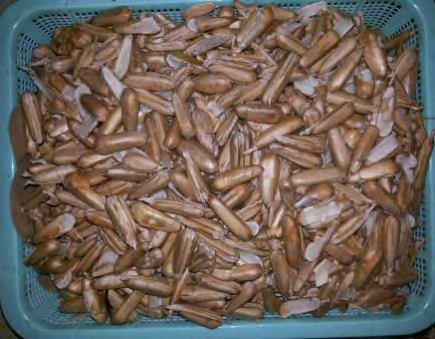

Nutritional value per 100 g
- Energy: 2,259–2,929 kJ (540–700 kcal)
- Carbohydrates: 28-33.5 g
- Sugars: 5 g
- Dietary fibre: 9.2-25 g
- Fat: 35.6-47 g
- Saturated: 18 g
- Trans: 0
- Protein: 11.9-18 g
Amino acids
Tryptophan	102-136 mg
Threonine	435-482 mg
Isoleucine	503-555 mg
Leucine	904-993 mg
Lysine	426-526 mg
Methionine	272-279 mg
Cystine	204-234 mg
Phenylalanine	571-613 mg
Tyrosine	408-438 mg
Valine	745-832 mg
Arginine	1238-1329 mg
Histidine	293-336 mg
Alanine	585-642 mg
Aspartic acid	1064-1197 mg
Glutamic acid	2285-2453 mg
Glycine	638-701 mg
Proline	530-613 mg
Serine	545-584 mg
Vitamins and minerals
Vitamins	Quantity %DV^{†}
Vitamin A	2 IU
Vitamin C	7% 6.40 mg
Vitamin E	3% 0.46 mg
Minerals	Quantity %DV^{†}
Calcium	62% 97-460 mg
Iron	2328% 419 mg
Phosphorus	191% 220-360 mg
Potassium	10% 300.22 mg
Sodium	3% 71.21 mg
- Other constituents: Quantity
- Water: 9%
- Cholesterol: 0
- ^{†}Percentages estimated using US recommendations for adults, except for potassium, which is estimated based on expert recommendation from the National Academies.

Karuka core (mesocarp)
Nutritional value per 100 g
- Carbohydrates
- Dietary fibre: 5.3 g
- Fat: 0.43 g
- Protein: 8.5 g
Amino acids
Threonine	289 mg
Isoleucine	281 mg
Leucine	485 mg
Lysine	196 mg
Methionine	170 mg
Phenylalanine	315 mg
Tyrosine	323 mg
Valine	340 mg
Arginine	255 mg
Histidine	162 mg
Alanine	391 mg
Aspartic acid	672 mg
Glutamic acid	748 mg
Glycine	459 mg
Proline	196 mg
Serine	315 mg
Vitamins and minerals
Minerals	Quantity %DV^{†}
Calcium	9% 120 mg
Phosphorus	11% 140 mg
- Other constituents: Quantity
- Cholesterol: 0
- ^{†}Percentages estimated using US recommendations for adults.

The karuka (Pandanus julianettii, also called karuka nut and Pandanus nut) is a species of tree in the screwpine family (Pandanaceae) and an important regional food crop in New Guinea. The nuts are more nutritious than coconuts, and are so popular that villagers in the highlands will move their entire households closer to trees for the harvest season.

== Description ==
The species was originally described in 1908 by Ugolino Martelli from only a few drupes in the collections of the Royal Botanic Gardens, Kew He was hesitant to describe it as a new species from only that, but the characteristics were so salient he published his description.

The tree is dioecious (individual plants either have male flowers or female ones), with male trees uncommon compared to females. It reaches 10–30 metres (33–98 ft) in height, with a grey trunk of 30 cm (12 in) in diameter and supported by prop roots or flying buttress roots up to 12 m (39 ft) in length and 15 cm (5.9 in) or more in diameter. The trunk has white mottling and is generally smooth with occasional warts or small knobs as well as rings of leaf scars. Inside the trunk is pithy and lacking cambium. The top of the tree sometimes branches, producing three or four crowns of leaves. Each crown will produce a single cluster of nuts, typically once every other season. Production is affected by the seasonality of local rainfall.

Leaves spiral up the trunk in opposite pairs. The large leathery leaves are 3–4 m (9.8–13.1 ft) long and 8–12 cm (3.1–4.7 in) wide. The apex of the leaf is attenuate and doubly-pleated, with prickles pointing up at the tip and along the margins and midrib. The leaves are dark green on top and dull cyan underneath.

The inflorescence on male trees is a densely-branched spadix with a dozen long spikes, each containing many staminate phalanges. In each phalange is a column 3 mm long topped by up to 9 subsessile anthers. The male flowers are white, and the whole male flowering organ may be up to 2 m (6 ft 7 in) long.

The pollen has a psilate exine (unornamented outer wall) 0.8 μm thick. The ornamentation is granular between echinae (short spines). The ulcerate aperture is 3 μm in diameter. Pollen grains measure an average of 30 × 14.5 μm in size.

On female trees, the inflorescence is a single ellipsoid or ovoid syncarp, or fruiting head, with off-white bracts. Female flowers can produce fruit without pollination, and are typically the only trees cultivated. The tree stops making leaves when new fruit is growing. The syncarp has up to a thousand densely-packed single-celled carpels that later turn into drupes.

The clavate, pentagonal drupes measure up to 12 cm (4.7 in) long and have a sharpened base, but typically are 9×1.5 cm, and are a pale blue-green colour. Each cluster contains about 1000 nuts. The endocarp is bony and thin, 5½ cm long, with rounded edges about 1½ cm wide. The seed-bearing locule is around 4 cm (1.6 in) long. The core of the mature head (mesocarp) has an appearance like honeycomb and is spongy and pink. The top of the mesocarp is fibrous, from 3 cm (1.2 in) long and up. Though Martelli did not have a complete syncarp, he knew the cluster of fruit must be large, estimating at least 30 cm (12 in) in diameter. He was correct, as the fruiting cluster is typically 15 to 30 cm in diameter. A mature head and stalk weigh up to 16 kg (35 lb), but average 6 kg (13 lb). but weights up to 27 kg (60 lb) have been reported.

It most closely resembles P. utilissimus, which is found the Philippines. People also harvest and eat nuts of P. antaresensis, P. brosimos, P. dubius, P. iwen, and P. limbatus, and P. odoratissima

== Names ==
The specific epithet "julianettii" honors naturalist Amedeo Giulianetti, who found the original type specimens.

Karuka is a loanword from Tok Pisin. Sometimes the tree is called 'karuga' or 'karuka nut pandanus'. The term 'karuka' can apply to both Pandanus julianettii and P. brosimos, though the latter is usually called 'wild karuka'. Both species, as well as P. dubius, can be called 'pandanus nut'. In addition to P. brosimos, 'wild karuka' can also refer to P. antaresensis, P. iwen, and P. limbatus, but nuts from these trees are a much smaller part of the local diet. In contexts where multiple karuka species are discussed, P. julianettii is sometimes termed 'planted karuka'. P. julianettii, P. iwen, and P. brosimos are also in the subsection named Karuka, which is in the monotypic section also named Karuka.

In New Guinea it has different names among each of the Papuan peoples. In the Ankave language it is xweebo. It is yase in the Baruya language. The Huli language word is anga, and it is also anga in the Duna language. In Kewa language it is aga, but it is unclear which dialect(s). In the Kewa pandanus language it is rumala agaa. The Kalam language term, in both standard and pandanus languages, is alŋaw, but it can also be called kumi or snay. The plant is called ama in the Wiru language. In the Pole language it is called maisene. It goes by ank in Angal language, and aenk in the Wola dialect. The Imbongu language word is amo.

The plant also has many names on the other half of the island. In Indonesian it is called pandan kelapa (lit.coconut pandan) and kelapa hutan (forest coconut), but these names can also refer to P. brosimos and P. iwen. According to field research by Kiwo et al. in Melagineri District, Lanny Jaya, the Lani people call it gawin, with woromo for P. brosimos, owandak for P. iwen. Meanwhile according to field research by Zebua et al. in Pirime District, Lanny Jaya, woromo is used to refer to P. iwen, while in another study in Jayawijaya, the Lani used woromo for P. julianettii with the Dani people call it tuke, hence the names have been used interchangeably by multiple publications from different regions and might be a separate species in the complex.

== Cultivars ==
There are up to 45 cultivars of karuka, many with different kernel shapes. There are likely many more, as some are known only to a small number of people in a single settlement. 'Tabuna' and 'Henga' are some of the most important. 'Tabuna' is popular because it is high-yielding, tastes good, and has no taboos on who/what can eat it and how/if it is cooked. At least two varieties are edible raw.

Named varieties include:

- Baerel
- Bort
- Dob
- Dobiyael
- Dor
- Emonk
- Gaslŋ
- Goalia
- Gurubu
- Hagidara
- Hael
- Hap
- Henga
- Homagal-iba
- Honal
- Honde
- Hones
- Humbuwm
- Kaba
- Kabali
- Kagat
- Kai
- Kambiyp
- Kat
- Kebali
- Kongop
- Korhombom
- Laek
- Lebaga
- Mabiyp
- Mabu
- Maeka
- Maela
- Maeraeng
- Mbul
- Morguwm
- Nenjay
- Ngaule
- Nolorwaembuw
- Ohaib
- Ombohonday
- Padua
- Pari
- Pebet
- Peliya
- Piliyhongor
- Posjuwk
- Sayzel
- Shond
- Shuwimb
- Tabuna
- Tabuwn
- Taeshaen
- Taziy
- Tenyon
- Tiyt
- Toi
- Tolo
- Tombpayliya
- Tomok
- Tumbi
- Tumbu
- Womb

It is possible a cultivar is listed more than once under different names, as Papua New Guinea has a very high linguistic diversity.

Benjamin Clemens Stone posits that P. julianettii and P. brosimos are a single species with many varieties, but does not support this point. However, Simon G. Haberle notes that the pollen of the two trees are indistinguishable by light microscopy. P. iwen may also be part of the species complex.

== Distribution and habitat ==
Giulianetti's type specimens were collected from Vanapa, British New Guinea (now southern Papua New Guinea). The tree can be found cultivated or wild on New Guinea, both in PNG and Indonesia (Central Papua and Highland Papua). Wild trees are found on the Huon Peninsula and in the highlands of New Guinea's central cordillera. In Papua New Guinea, the tree is most commonly grown in Southern Highlands, Western Highlands, Eastern Highlands, Enga, and Chimbu Provinces, and it is found in all provinces on the mainland except East Sepik. It grows in montane forests between 1,300 and 3,300 m (4,300 and 10,800 ft) in elevation in areas that get 2–5 m (6.6–16 ft) mean annual precipitation. It grows in both dry and wet soils, but prefers good soil fertility. Trees will grow in clumped groups of 5 to 10 individuals per hectare.

== Ecology ==
Karuka produces fruit around February, with an occasional secondary season in July. Typically each branch will only flower every other year. The natural pollination syndrome is unknown, but the flowers can be pollinated by humans. Seed dispersal is by humans, birds, and other animals. According to the Kalam people of Madang Province, the Lorentz's mosaic-tailed rat (Paramelomys lorentzii) helps spread karuka seeds. A fallen syncarp will disintegrate completely in about 3 days in the forest.

Fungal pests of karuka include leaf spot, diffuse leaf spot, black leaf mould (Lembosia pandani), sooty mould (Meliola juttingii), and fungus on seeds (Macrophoma pandani). The leaf moulds do not do much damage. The sooty mould seems to grow on insect frass. The black leaf mould only affects some varieties.

The bacteria Pectobacterium carotovorum subsp. carotovorum can also cause bacterial soft rot and necrosis on the leaves, but causes more severe damage to the related species Pandanus conoideus.

Bush crickets are serious insect pests, including Segestes gracilis and Segestidea montana, which eat the leaves and can sometimes kill trees. Growers will stuff leaves and grass in between the leaves of the crown to keep insects out. An unknown species of black grub will burrow into the cluster and eat the spongy core, causing the nuts to turn black and the whole bunch to fall off the tree. Woodboring beetles sometimes attack the prop root of the tree.

Possums also eat the nuts, as do rodents such as squirrel-toothed rats (Anisomys imitator), eastern white-eared giant rats (Hyomys goliath), Rothschild's woolly rats (Mallomys rothschildi), and giant naked-tailed rats (Uromys anak). Growers will put platforms or other obstacles on the trunks of trees to keep the pests out.

Harvested nuts are often damaged by rats and cockroaches. Hanging nuts in the smoky areas above fires can prevent this, but after a while the taste of the nuts is affected.

== Uses ==
On New Guinea karuka is cultivated crop, and has been used as a major food source since nearly 31,000 years ago in the Pleistocene. In PNG nearly 2 million people (almost half the rural population) live in regions where karuka is commonly eaten. There is high demand for it in the New Guinea Highlands: Entire households (including pigs, who are sometimes fed the fruits) will move from the valleys to higher elevations at harvest time, often for several weeks. Each household will average 12 to 176 trees.

Trade in karuka is small-scale and not commercial. Local marketplaces typically will have 12 to 50 fruits for sale. With some coordination between state agencies and private sector, karuka could have export market access. The crop has a medium potential for large-scale sustainable commercialization in the region, but care must be taken in the sensitive local environments to expanded agriculture. Diets of tree owners could also be negatively influenced by rapid commercialization.

The endosperm, a white kernel, is eaten raw, roasted, smoked, or mumued. Nuts that are not immediately eaten are typically sun-dried for storage. The karuka kernels have a sweet, coconut taste, or savory and like walnuts. Smoked or cooked karuka is either stored in the rafters or sold at local marketplaces. The uncooked clusters can also be stored for months buried in waterlogged earth, which possibly ferments it. It is a regional staple food and one of the few plants in the area with a high protein content. The spongy core of the multiple fruit cluster can also be cooked and eaten after the nuts are removed.

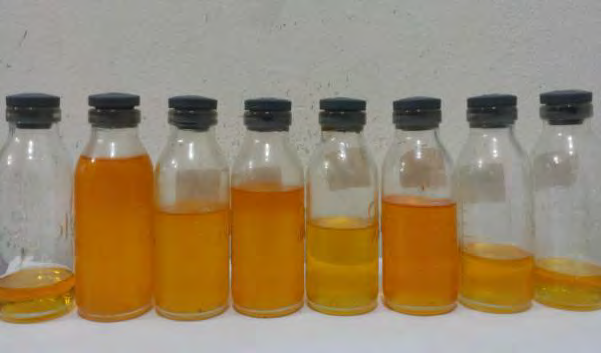
Oil extracted from the nuts

The high fat content means the nuts can be processed into an edible yellow oil. Karuka oil contains 52.39% oleic acid, 44.90% palmitic acid, and 0.19% stearic acid. The oil is a good source of Vitamin E (α-tocopherol 5.03 mg/100 g). The colour of the oil is from the carotenoids, which are at a concentration of 2.75 μg/g. The antioxidant activity for the oil is fairly low, and it is higher in saturated than unsaturated fats.

Some subjective reports indicate that children are healthier after karuka season, but there may also be increased incidence of tropical ulcers and pig-bel (caused by Clostridium perfringens). But the connections, if any, are unclear.

Trunks and buttress roots are used for building. The sheets of bark are used for house walls. The leaves are used for bush shelters and raincapes. The leaves were the preferred building material for housing in Papua New Guinea before colonial contact. The durable white spathe leaves on male inflorescences are used by the Wola people to wrap pearl shells.

Karuka can be cultivated by cutting a mature branch and replanting it (vegetative propagation). Suckers can also be replanted. Nurseries also plant seeds directly. New nuts will grow when a tree is at least five or six years old, and can keep producing for up to fifty years. The tree can tolerate temperatures down to 3 °C (37 °F) for extended periods and 0 °C (32 °F) for short periods. The USDA hardiness is 10–12, and is hardy to zone 10 in the UK system.

In Upper Karint near Pingirip, karukas are planted as boundary lines between garden plots.

== In culture ==
In PNG's Central Province Premier Rugby League the team for Goilala District is called the Karukas.

== See also ==
- Domesticated plants and animals of Austronesia
- Pandanus languages
