= Nipa Rural LLG =

Local-level government in Papua New Guinea

- Location within Papua New Guinea
- Coordinates: 6.143855°S 143.451274°E
- Country: Papua New Guinea
- Province: Southern Highlands Province
- Time zone: UTC+10 (AEST)

Nipa Rural LLG is a local-level government (LLG) of Southern Highlands Province, Papua New Guinea.

== Wards ==
- 01. Soi
- 02. Nipa H/School
- 03. Haralinja
- 04. Almanda 1
- 05. Almanda 2
- 06. Sesenda 2
- 07. Sesenda 1
- 08. Soi'l 2
- 09. Shumbi 2
- 10. Shumbi 1
- 11. Ebil 2
- 12. Ebil 1
- 13. Eganda 3
- 14. Erepi
- 15. Ungubi 2
- 16. Egenda 2
- 17. Emb
- 18. Suma 1
- 19. Suma 2
- 20. Hepinja 1 & 16
- 21. Poiya 7
- 22. Ingin 2
- 23. Ingin 1
- 24. Merep
- 25. Erep 5
- 26. Tupip
- 27. Poiya 6
- 28. Nipa Station
- 29. Ungubi 1
- 30. Egenda 1
- 31. Pulim 3
- 32. Pulim 2
- 33. Pulim 1
- 34. Kware 2
- 35. Kware 1
- 36. Komea 2
- 37. Komea 1
- 38. Kombela
- 39. Injip 2
- 40. Injip 1
- 41. Puril Mission Station
