= Kyaka language =

Engan language of Papua New Guinea

Kyaka
- Native to: Papua New Guinea
- Region: Enga Province
- Native speakers: (15,000 cited 1981)
- Language family: Engan: North Engan; Kyaka

Language codes
- ISO 639-3: kyc
- Glottolog: kyak1244

Kyaka (Enga-Kyaka) is an Engan language of the East New Guinea Highlands in Enga Province, Papua New Guinea.
