= Enga language =

Language of Enga Province

Enga
- Native to: Papua New Guinea
- Region: Enga Province
- Native speakers: (230,000 cited 2000 census)
- Language family: Trans–New Guinea: Engan; North Engan; Enga
- Writing system: Latin script

Language codes
- ISO 639-3: enq
- Glottolog: enga1252

Arafundi-Enga Pidgin
- Native to: Papua New Guinea
- Region: Enga Province
- Native speakers: None
- Language family: Enga-based pidgin

Language codes
- ISO 639-3: enq
- Glottolog: araf1245

Enga is a language of the East New Guinea Highlands spoken by a quarter-million people in Enga Province, Papua New Guinea. It has the largest number of speakers of any Trans–New Guinea language, as well as any native language in New Guinea, and is second overall after Papuan Malay.

An Enga-based pidgin is used by speakers of Arafundi languages.

== Population ==
There are currently over 150,000 Enga people occupying the mountainous region ranging from Mount Hagen and westward to Porgera. Enga people are traditionally sedentary gardeners who grow sweet potatoes as their staple crop, and who keep pigs and fowls. Coffee and pyrethrum are also grown as cash crops in Enga culture. Pigs, pearls, shells, axes, and plumes are items of wealth and signify social occasions when exchanged or circulated. Enga clans have boundaries defining their homesteads across the territory and have been known to fight with each other over land, marriage exchanges, or vengeance. Men and women traditionally occupy different homes because Enga myths postulate that women may be unclean and dangerous to men. Enga society is not organised around a single chief or headman; rather, it is wealthy men who have political and administrative control.

== Phonology ==
Vowel sounds include /i e ɑ o u/.

Consonants
		Bilabial	Alveolar	Retroflex	Palatal	Velar
Stop	voiceless	p	t			k
Stop	prenasalized	ᵐb	ⁿd			ᵑɡ
Affricate	voiceless		t͡s ~ s			
Affricate	prenasalized		ⁿd͡z			
Nasal		m	n		ɲ	ŋ
Flap				ɽ		
Approximant	plain				j	w
Approximant	lateral				ʎ	

/k/ is pronounced as fricative [x] between low and back vowels. /t/ is pronounced as [r] intervocalically. /ts/ may also be realised as [s]. All final vowels are devoiced. Alveolar stops /t, ⁿd/ may be realised as retroflex [ʈ, ᶯɖ].

The Enga orthography includes 21 different letters.

== Word classes ==
=== Nouns ===
Enga nouns co-occur with modifiers dóko and méndé as the and a, some, or else, which play a role in the noun class system of the language.

Akáli dóko epe-ly-á-mo.
man the come-PRES
The man is coming.

Akáli méndé epe-ly-á-mo.
man a come-PRES
A man is coming.

Noun classes in Enga appear to be cued primarily through syntactic patterns. The classes denote animates, inanimates, body parts, locationals, events, colors, inner states, and other minor classes. Nouns may also be inflected for cases such as agentive AG , instrumental INST, possessive POSS, locative LOC, and temporal. In the chart below it shows the case distribution and the noun classes in relation to one another.

Noun Classes
Noun Class	DET dóko or méndé	AG	POSS	INST	LOC
animate	dóko/méndé	x	x		
animate (pronoun)		x	x		
animate (body part)	dóko/méndé			x	x
animate (artifacts)	dóko/méndé		x	x	
location					x
events	dóko/méndé				
color	dóko/méndé				
inner state		x			

Animates can occur in different subclasses such as proper names. Some examples of animates can include takánge (father), endángi (mother), Aluá (a man's name), Pasóne (a woman's name), or mená (pig). All of which would include a determiner being either demonstrative or indefinite and can be with the agentive or possessive cases, but not used instrumentally or locative.

Body parts are in the animate class and can include words like kíngi (arm), pungí (liver), and yanúngí (skin, body). These differ from the previous classes in which they may have a determiner occur either as the instrumental or locative, but not in the agentive or possessive cases. Location nouns are used to determine the place. These words can include kákasa (bush), Wápaka (Wabag- a place), or Lakáipa (Lagaipa- a river). This class only uses a determiner in the location case and nothing else.

The noun morphology of Enga is an exclusively suffixing language. These suffixes are generally the last member of the noun phrase, being either the determiner or the adjective. This expresses the inflectional categories of the noun such as tense, aspect, person, number, gender or mood. The suffixes can be broken down into two main groups: case suffixes and others. Case suffixes are exclusively expressed in noun and noun phrases while other suffixes can be on either noun and noun phrases or verb and verb phrases. Enga differentiates nouns from noun phrases though the case endings. There are seven different cases in which these are formally marked: associative -pa (only two)/ -pipa (two or more), agentive -me/-mi, instrumental -me/mi, possessive -nya, locative -nya/-sa/-ka, temporal -sa/-nya/-pa, and vocative -oo. Other suffixes, besides case suffixes, are broken into six different categories and occur only on nouns. There is the conjunctive suffix -pi meaning 'and' or 'even', two different suffixes -le meaning 'rather' or -yalé 'like' to indicate similarity, two different suffixes -mba 'very' or an argumentative -mba to indicate emphasis or contrast. These two forms of -mba differ in meaning as well as tone. When it is used in an argumentative sense it is said with a higher tone than previous syllables versus when it is used to emphasize.

Although it includes conjunctive suffixes, Enga does not actually include any conjunction words such as 'and' other than pánde 'or'. Instead those conjunctive suffixes are used to combine the noun or noun phrase with all the noun phrases and then typically followed by the determiner.

==== Pronouns ====
Enga pronouns stand out morphosyntactically but can vary from dialects:

- nambá I
- émba you
- baá he, she, it
- nalímba we two
- nyalámbo you two
- dolápo they two
- náima we plural
- nyakáma you plural
- dúpa they plural

These pronouns are similar to animates in that determiners may occur in agentive, and possessive cases, but not used instrumentally or locative.

== Morphosyntax ==
Enga verbs play a central role in the syntax of the language, showing highly complex morphology. Enga is a mostly suffixing language. The basic word order is SOV.

Akáli dokó-mé mená dóko p-í-á.y
man DET-AG pig DET hit-PAST
The man hit the pig.

Enga verbs convey ideas such subordination or coordination which in Indo-European languages are often cued via syntactic means (conjunctions such as ‘and’, or ‘because’, etc.). Enga verbs also express different types of modality, such as ability, possibility, or need, as well as interrogation via suffixes (i.e. -pe/-pi):

Akáli dokó-mé mená dóko p-i-á-pe?
man DET-AG pig DET hit-PAST
Did the man hit the pig?

=== Verbal inflection ===
Enga verbs inflect for person, number, and tense-aspect. There are five different tense-aspect categories and three grammatical numbers in Enga. Tense-aspects include a future tense, a present tense, and three different past tenses. The numbers are singular, plural, and dual (expressed via the prefix na-).

==== Tense-aspect-mood ====
The immediate past refers to actions that occurred within the day. The near past refers to actions that occurred the previous day, a time in which the speaker does not recall, or a time before the previous day but is intending on comparing it to other events in the past. Finally, the far past refers to actions that occurred before the previous day. I

The suffix i-la indicates consecutiveness between sentences with the same subject. Finally, the -pa marker conjoins sentences with different subjects but still contain consecutiveness.

Baa-mé kalái pé-ta-la yólé ny-í-á.
he-AG work do-COM-LA wage get-PAST
Having done the work, he received his wage.

==== Coordination ====
In sentences that express two different subjects or two different actions collectively, so that a sentence such as ‘he went and worked’ would be expressed in Enga via a coordinating suffix (-o) on the first verb:

Baá p-é-á. Baa-mé kalái p-i-á.
he go-PAST. he-AG work do-PAST.
He went. He worked.

Baa-mé pá-o kalái p-i-á.
he-AG go-O work do-PAST
He went and worked.

The suffix -o (allophone -u in verbs with high vowels) also expresses actions originating, existing, or happening during the same period of time.

Baa-mé andá-ka pitu-ú kalái pi-ly-a-mó.
she-AG house-LOC sit-O work do-PRES
She is working while she is sitting in the house.

Namba-mé meé pyó-o kat-e-ó-pa baa-mé kalái andáke p-i-á.
I-AG {for no reason} do-O stand-PAST-TEMP he-AG work big do-PAST
While I was doing nothing he did a lot of work.
Or
I did nothing and then he did a lot of work.

There are two different causal suffixes -pa and -sa. When the verb ends in a suffixed vowel regarding the past, these two suffixes are added together to fully conjugate the verb.

Baá-mé kalái pyá-a ná-ep-e-a-mo-pa nambá tánge-me kalái ná-i-o.
he-AG work do-INF NEG-come-PAST-CAUS I sefl-AG work NEG-do-PAST
Since he didn't come to work, I didn't work myself.

Namba-mé kalái pyá-a ná-ep-e-o-pa/sa baá tánge-me kalái ná-p-i-a.
I-AG work do-INF NEG-come-PAS-CAUS he self-AG work NEG-do-PAST
Since I didn't come to work, he didn't work himself.

Enga also includes conditional suffixes. These help distinguish what is considered 'real' conditions and 'irreal' conditions. A real condition is one in which real consequences can occur versus an irreal condition which denies the reality of the actions that are expressed as well as their consequences. To express a real conditional clause in the future tense the suffix -mo/-no are added to the verb with the addition of kandao dóko followed immediately after. For example, when connecting the following two sentences:

Akáli dóko p-é-á.
man DET go-PAST
The man went.

and

Énda dóko p-á-a-mo.
woman DET go-PAST-AUG.
The woman went.

Together, as a conditional clause, it would form:

Akáli dóko alémbo pá-t-a-mo kanda-ó dóko énda dóko {wámba andípu} p-á-a-mo.
man DET {day before yesterday} go-FUT-AUG see-O DET woman DET {before today} go-PAST-AUG
If the man went the day before yesterday, then the woman went earlier today.
