= Mendi Urban LLG =

Local-level government in Papua New Guinea

- Location within Papua New Guinea
- Coordinates: 6.13891°S 143.659011°E
- Country: Papua New Guinea
- Province: Southern Highlands Province
- Time zone: UTC+10 (AEST)

Mendi Urban LLG is a local-level government (LLG) of Southern Highlands Province, Papua New Guinea. The Mendi language is spoken in the LLG.

== Wards ==
- 06. Teta
- 07. Wakwak/Umbimi
- 08. Longo/Kave
- 09. Mes Wa
- 10. Kumin/Kambiakip
- 11. Tubiri
- 12. Polomanda/Unjamap
- 13. Tente 1
- 14. Tente 2
- 81. Mendi Town
- 82. Wakwak Urban
- 83: Old Compound Paga hill
- 84: North Kagua
- 85: PTB/Works?Takabox
