= Kagua Rural LLG =

Local-level government in Papua New Guinea

- Country: Papua New Guinea
- Province: Southern Highlands Province
- Time zone: UTC+10 (AEST)

Kagua Rural LLG is a local-level government (LLG) of Southern Highlands Province, Papua New Guinea.

== Wards ==
- 01. Alopea
- 02. Aboma
- 03. Kagua Station
- 04. Karia (Aliya)
- 05. Katiloma
- 06. Kira
- 07. Koalilombo
- 08. Andari
- 09. Mapuanda
- 10. Marili
- 11. Mendo
- 12. Mungaro
- 13. Pawabi
- 14. Porane
- 15. Raku
- 16. Rogoma
- 17. Rongka
- 18. Rumbalere
- 19. Sumbura
- 20. Wakiapanda
- 21. Tulire
- 22. Yalu
- 23. Yango
- 24. Yame
- 45. Alenda
