= Melpa language =

Trans–New Guinea language spoken in Papua New Guinea

Melpa
- Native to: Papua New Guinea
- Region: Mount Hagen District, Western Highlands Province
- Native speakers: (130,000 cited 1991)
- Language family: Trans–New Guinea: Chimbu–Wahgi; Hagen; Melpa
- Writing system: Latin

Language codes
- ISO 639-3: med
- Glottolog: melp1238

Melpa (Meldpa, Mbowamb) is a Papuan language spoken by about 130,000 people predominantly in Mount Hagen and the surrounding district of Western Highlands Province, Papua New Guinea. It is spoken by the Kawelka people and other related tribes.

Melpa has a pandanus language used during karuka harvests. Melpa has a velar lateral, written as a double-barred el (Ⱡ, ⱡ). Melpa is notable for its binary counting system. A dictionary of Melpa has been compiled by Stewart, Strathern and Trantow (2011).

== Phonology ==
Note: the descriptions of these sounds is not clear, so the conversion to IPA below may not be accurate.

=== Consonants ===
		Labial	Dental	Alveolar	Palatal	Velar
Nasal		m	n̪	n		ŋ
Plosive	voiceless	p	t̪	t		k
Plosive	prenasalized	mb	n̪d̪	nd		ŋɡ
Rhotic				ɾ		
Lateral			ɮ̪ ⟨l⟩	ɺd^{?} ⟨ld⟩		ʟ̝ ⟨gl, ⱡ⟩
Semivowel		w			j	

Ladefoged analyzes the laterals instead as /l̪t̪/, /l/, /ʟ/, and the rhotic as /ɹ/.

Plosives and laterals are voiceless in word-final position.

=== Vowels ===
	Front	Central	Back
High	i		ɯ ⟨ʉ⟩, u
Near-high	ɪ		ʊ
Mid	e		o
Low		a	

== Numeral system ==
Numeral	Melpa	Literal meaning
1	tenda	"one"
2	ragl	"two"
3	ragltika	"two-one"
4	tembokak	"four"
5	pemp ti gul	"one past four"
6	pemp ragl gul	"two past four"
7	pemp ragltika gul	"two-one past four"
8	engakl	"eight"
9	pemp ti pip	"one past eight"
10	pemp ragl pip	"two past eight"

== Media ==
Temboka, a dialect of Melpa, is the native language of the Ganiga tribe, who featured prominently in the Highlands Trilogy of documentaries by Robin Anderson and Bob Connolly (First Contact, Joe Leahy's Neighbours, and Black Harvest).

The documentary Ongka's Big Moka also has Melpa dialogue.
