= Pandanus language =

Special language used in Papua New Guinea

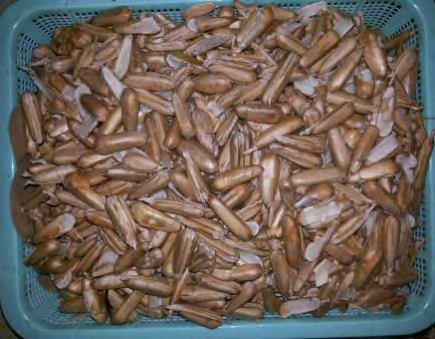
Karuka nuts (Pandanus julianettii)

A pandanus language is an elaborate avoidance language among several of the peoples of the eastern New Guinea Highlands, used when collecting Pandanus nuts.

== Use ==
Annually, people camp in the forest to harvest and cook the nuts of karuka (both Pandanus julianettii and Pandanus brosimos). Many normal words are thought to be unhealthy for the plants, as they carry associations inimical to the proper growth of the nuts. An elaborate vocabulary of up to a thousand words and phrases has developed to replace the taboo vocabulary. The new vocabulary focuses on words involved with trips to harvest karuka nuts, and changes as words become known outside an area. The language is often spoken to control the claimed magical properties of the higher elevations where the karuka grows, and to placate dangerous nature spirits like Kita-Menda (also called Giluwe yelkepo), the ritual keeper of the feral dogs. Pandanus language generally should never be used outside the area where the trees grow, for fear of mountain spirits hearing it and coming down to investigate.

All ages and genders are expected to know the ritual language before entering the taboo areas, but outsiders who do not know the language may be allowed to speak Tok Pisin instead. As Tok Pisin has become more widely spoken in the area, Pandanus languages have been spoken less. Newer generations also seem to be less afraid of the deep forest, and do not see much need for the protective talk. The Kewa and Imbongu pandanus languages were thought to be dying out already by the 1990s.

== Structure ==
The grammar and vocabulary of pandanus language is based on the mother tongue, but a restricted and consolidated form, especially for names of living organisms. Often words are grouped into umbrella terms which do not have an equivalent concept in ordinary speech. Pandanus language words can also be loanwords from other languages.

'Karuka', as a term, is not treated consistently across all Pandanus languages. For example, in ordinary Kewa language it is aga, but in the Kewa Pandanus language it is rumala agaa. Conversely, in both ordinary Kalam language and its Pandanus register, the word is the same: alŋaw.

== Languages with Pandanus registers ==
Pandanus registers have been best documented for:

- Imbongu
- Kalam
- Kewa
- Kobon
- Melpa
- Mendi
- Taiap

The Kalam Pandanus language, called alŋaw mnm (pandanus language) or ask-mosk mnm (avoidance language), is also used when eating or cooking cassowary, as opposed to speaking monmon mnm (ordinary/free language). It is not spoken out of fear of spirits, but to prevent the nuts from being watery, tough, or rotten; or in the case for cassowaries, to show respect to the bird. Kalam Pandanus language may also be used outside the forest without penalty unlike other versions. This register is possibly thousands of years old, and may be inspired by older Pandanus languages.

The Huli language has an avoidance register called tayenda tu ha illili (bush divide taboo) used for collecting Pandanus as well as hunting or traveling. Tayenda, like many of the above, is used to evade malevolent bush spirits.

== See also ==
- Korean ginseng-harvesters' cant
