= Kuk Swamp =

Kuk Early Agricultural Site
UNESCO World Heritage Site
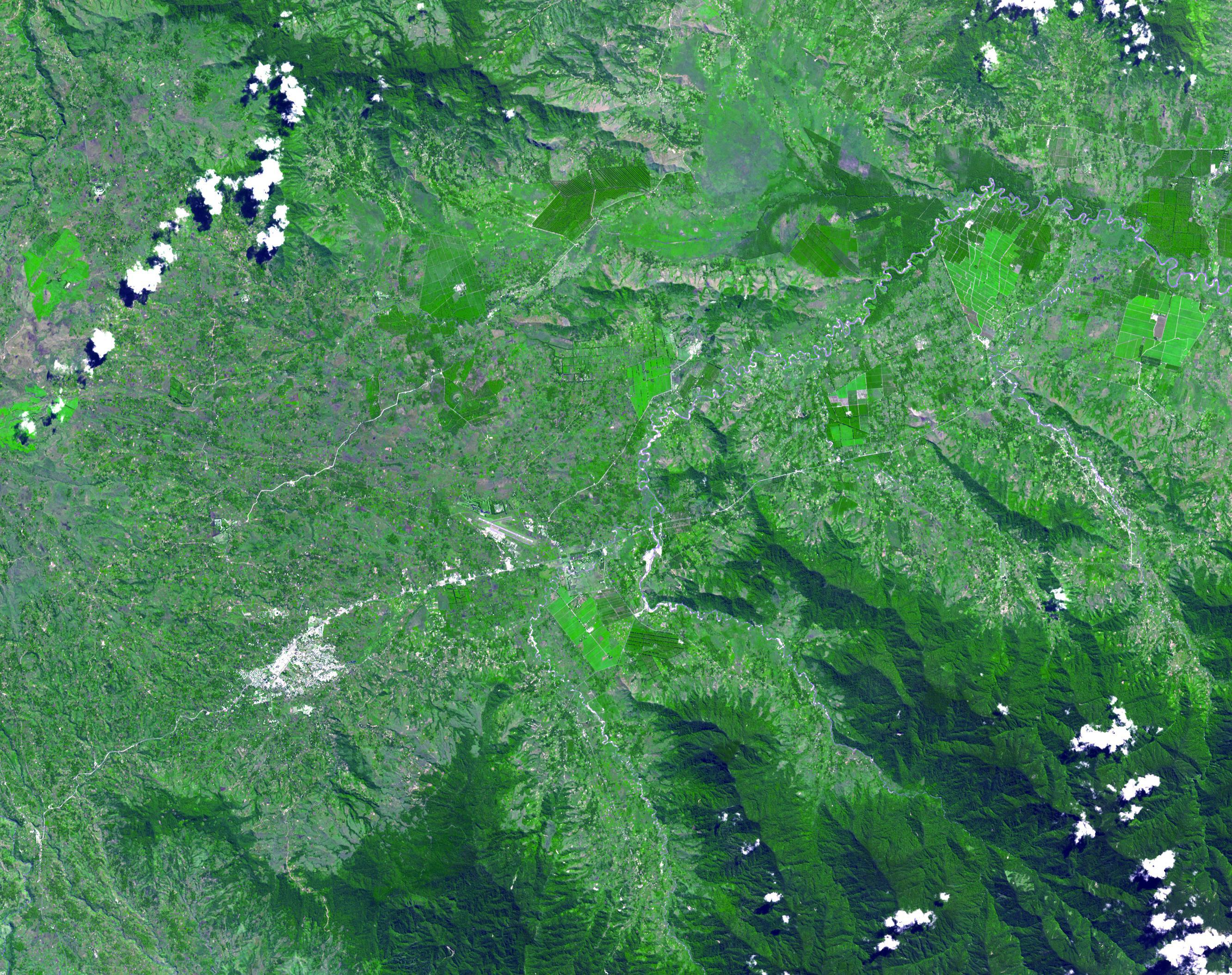
- Satellite image of the wider Kuk Swamp area
- Interactive map of Kuk Early Agricultural Site
- Location: Western Highlands Province, Papua New Guinea
- Criteria: Cultural: (iii), (iv)
- Reference: 887
- Inscription: 2008 (32nd Session)
- Area: 116 ha (290 acres)
- Buffer zone: 195 ha (480 acres)
- Coordinates: 5°46′57″S 144°19′48″E

Kuk Swamp is an archaeological site in Papua New Guinea, that lies in the Wahgi Valley of the highlands at an altitude of about 1,550 metres (5,090 ft) some 12–13 kilometres (7.5–8.1 mi) northeast of Mount Hagen, the capital of Western Highlands Province. The swamp developed in a former lake basin, as it was filled by an alluvial fan or deposits of water-transported material. Archaeological evidence for early agricultural drainage systems was found here, beginning about 9,000 years ago. It includes draining ditches of three major classes, which were used to convert the area to an anthropogenic grassland. The native crop taro was grown here.

In addition, evidence of cultivation of bananas and sugar cane has been found, estimated to have begun 6,900 – 6,400 years ago. The Kuk Swamp was recognized in 2008 as a World Heritage Site by UNESCO, as one of the places in the world where people independently developed agriculture.

Currently, the Kawelka people, a Melpa-speaking tribe, lives in the Kuk Swamp area.

== History ==
The Kuk Creek flows through the entirety of the fan to a catchment in the lower hills of the south region. Channels were constructed to carry water past the reach of the fan. If these channels were blocked, the area would develop into a swamp, diverting water into smaller distributary channels. Archaeological evidence for early agricultural drainage systems, dating back to about 9,000 years ago, has been found here. Features such as pits, postholes, and runnels have been discovered at the site, indicating early agricultural practices such as planting, digging, and tethering of plants.

Irrigation draining ditches, dating back to 9,000 years ago, have also been found at the site. A variety of plants, including taro, were grown at what would have been the edge of their cultivable limit in the highlands. These ditches can be classified into three types: major disposal channels, large field ditches, and small field ditches. Major disposal channels were constructed to divert water flowing south from the fan and direct it towards the northeast areas. Large and small field ditches are more uniform and surround the perimeter of planting areas. They connect with major disposal channels. During this time, the people of Kuk Swamp transformed their landscape into an anthropogenic grassland suitable for agriculture.

During archaeological excavation of drainage channels, artifacts such as wooden digging sticks and a grindstone were discovered. The ditches were cleaned out and a small trench was dug to study the different layers of clay used in their construction. These layers suggest that the ditches were deliberately constructed by people.

Additional archaeobotanical evidence, dated to between 6,900 and 6,400 years ago, has been discovered showing the cultivation of bananas and sugar cane at Kuk Swamp. Numerous banana phytoliths have been found in the cultivation plots of the swamp. As bananas do not produce phytoliths in the same quantity and frequency as grasses and other plants, researchers have concluded that the abundance of banana phytoliths found in a managed grassland landscape between 6950 and 6550 years ago indicates deliberate planting. The bananas grown at Kuk Swamp were Eumusa bananas, which became the most significant and largest group of banana domesticates. This makes Kuk Swamp one of the earliest known sites for the development of agriculture.

The site was studied by Australian archaeologist Jack Golson.

In recognition of its historical significance, Kuk Swamp was designated as a World Heritage Site by UNESCO in 2008.

== See also ==
- Indigenous people of New Guinea
- Austronesian peoples
- Domesticated plants and animals of Austronesia
