= Engan languages =

Family of languages

Engan
- Enga–Kewa–Huli; Enga – Southern Highlands
- Geographic distribution: New Guinea
- Linguistic classification: Trans–New Guinea or Papuan Gulf?: Central New Guinea Highlands; Engan
- Subdivisions: North (Engan); South (Kewa–Huli)

Language codes
- Glottolog: enga1254
- Map: The Engan languages of New Guinea The Engan languages Trans–New Guinea languages Other Papuan languages Austronesian languages Uninhabited

The Engan languages, or more precisely Enga–Kewa–Huli or Enga – Southern Highland, are a small family of Papuan languages of the highlands of Papua New Guinea. The two branches of the family are rather distantly related, but were connected by Franklin and Voorhoeve (1973).

== Name ==
The name "Engan" is often restricted to the northern branch of the family, to those languages transparently related to Enga, but also sometimes to the family as a whole.

== Languages ==
The languages fall into three quite distinct branches: Engan proper, Huli, and Southern Highlands:

- North Engan (Engan proper): Enga–Kyaka–Lembena, Ipili, Bisorio (Nete, Iniai)
- South Engan (Kewa–Huli)
  - Huli
  - Southern Highlands: Angal (Mendi), Kewa; Samberigi (Sau)

== Classification ==
The Engan family constitutes a branch of the Trans–New Guinea languages in the classifications of Wurm and of Malcolm Ross, but the evidence for this is weak.

Usher links the Engan and Chimbu languages in a Central New Guinea Highlands family.

There are a considerable number of resemblances with Wiru. Borrowing has not been ruled out as the reason for this, though the pronouns are similar as well.

== Proto-language ==
=== Phonemes ===
Usher (2020) reconstructs the consonant inventory as follows:

*m	*n		
*p	*t		*k
*mb	*nd		*ŋg
*w	*l	*j	

Vowels are *i *e *a *o *u.

=== Pronouns ===
Pronouns are easy to reconstruct for the northern and southern branches, but much more difficult for Engan as a whole. Ross (2005) has the following for the singular, Wiru has been added for comparison:

	pEngan	N Engan	S Engan	Wiru
1	**nə	*na-ba	*ní	no (gen. anu)
2	**ne-ke	*ne-ba	*ne-ke	ne (gen. ne-ke)
3	?	*ba	*[n]i-bu	one

Usher (2020) has not yet published reconstruction of Engan as a whole, but has done Engan proper:

Engan proper
	sg	du	pl
1	*na(-mba)	*nali(-mba)	*nani(-ma)
2	*ni(-mba)		
3	*[e]-mba		

=== Vocabulary ===
Some lexical reconstructions of Proto-Trans Enga (Proto-Engan) by Usher (2020) are:

gloss	Proto-Trans-Enga	Proto-Southern Highlands	Huli
name	*ŋge	*[i]mbi	mi-ni
fire/tree	*ita	*ti	iɾa
moon	*kana	*eke, *jumba	ege
four	*tumenda	*mala	ma-
path	*kaita	*pota	haɾiga
stand	*kata	*ka	ha
cassowary	*laima	*jati	jaɾi
skin	*jan[o/u]	*joŋgale	doŋgo-ne

== Modern reflexes ==
The Enga-Kewa-Huli reflexes of proto-Trans-New Guinea (pTNG) etyma, if Engan languages are indeed members of the Trans-New Guinea family, are:

Enga:

- mona ‘heart’ < *mundun
- yaka ‘bird’ < *yaka(i)
- lyaŋa ‘ashes’ < *la(ŋ,k)a
- ŋaŋa ‘baby < *ŋaŋ(a)
- (m)ama ‘mother’ < *am(a,i)
- kuri ‘bone’ < *kondaC
- kare ‘ear’ < *kand(e,i)k(V]
- ne- ‘eat’ < *na
- apa(ne) ‘father’ < *apa
- iti ‘hair’ < *iti[C]
- endo ‘fire’ < *kend(o,u)p
- lema ‘louse’ < *niman
- kana ‘moon’ < *takVn[V]
- mana ‘instructions’ < *mana
- kitama ‘morning’ < *k(i,u)tuma
- kumi- ‘die’ < *kumV-
- re- ‘speak’ < *nde-
- maa ‘taro’ < *mV
- ita ‘tree’ < *inda

Huli:

- ega ‘bird’ < *yaka(i)
- na- ‘eat’ < *na-
- aba ‘father’ < *apa
- iri ‘hair’ < *iti[C]
- ira ‘tree’ < *inda
- ma ‘taro’ < *mV

Kewa:

- ama ‘mother’ < *am(a,i)
- ibi ‘name’ < *imbi
- iri ‘hair’ < *iti[C]
- uni ‘bone’ < *kwanjaC
- apu ‘tail’ < *a(mb,m)u
- lema ‘louse’ < *niman
- oma ‘die’ < *kumV-
- reka- ‘stand’ < *t(a,e)kV-
- la- ‘talk’ < *nde-
- maa ‘taro’ < *mV
- yaa ‘bird’ < *yaka(i)

Mendi:

- am ‘mother’ < *am(a,i)
- ap ‘father’ < *apa
- mbi ‘name’ < *imbi
- ome- ‘die’ < *kumV-

== Basic vocabulary ==
Basic vocabulary of Enga and Kewa from William A. Foley (1986). The pairs of words are not necessarily cognate.

gloss	Enga	Kewa
‘two’	rama	laapo
‘man’	akari	ali
‘water’	ipa	ipa
‘fire’	ita	repona
‘tree’	ita	are
‘leaf’	yoko	yo
‘root’	pingi	pitaa
‘house’	ada	ada
‘breast’	adu	adu
‘tooth’	nege	agaa
‘bone’	kori	kuli
‘ear’	kare	kale
‘hair’	iti	iri
‘leg’	kape	aa
‘blood’	kupapu	kupaa
‘hand’	ruma	ki
‘egg’	kapa	yaa apaa
‘sun’	nita	nare
‘axe’	patama	rai
‘netbag’	nuu	nu
‘eat’	ne-	na-
‘die’	kumi-	koma-
‘say’	re-	la-
‘give’	mai-/gi-	gi-
‘big’	adake	adaa
