= Huli language =

Engan language spoken in Papua New Guinea

Huli
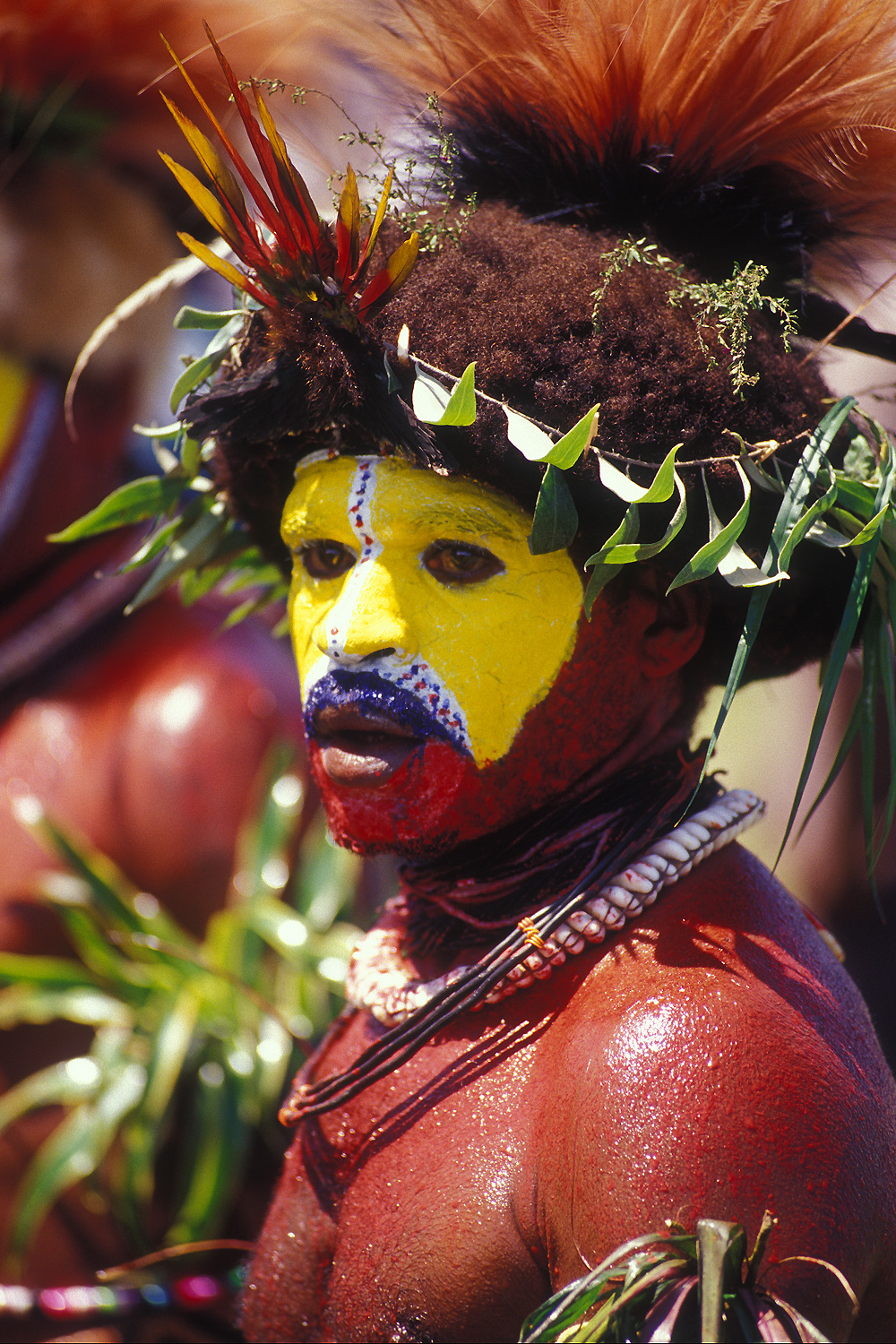
- Huli Wigman from Hela Province of Papua New Guinea
- Region: Southern Highlands, Papua New Guinea
- Ethnicity: Huli people
- Native speakers: 150,000 (2011)
- Language family: Trans-New Guinea?: Engan; South Engan; Huli
- Writing system: Latin script (Huli alphabet); Huli Braille

Language codes
- ISO 639-3: hui
- Glottolog: huli1244

Huli is a Tari language spoken by the Huli people of the Hela Province of Papua New Guinea.

Huli has a pandanus language called tayenda tu ha illili (bush divide taboo) used for collecting karuka nuts (anga) as well as hunting or traveling. Tayenda is used to evade malevolent bush spirits. The grammar for Tayenda is nearly identical to normal Huli, but the vocabulary is changed, often borrowing words from Duna but with changed meanings.

== Phonology ==
Huli has a syllable structure of (C)V.

=== Vowels ===
	Front	Back
Close	i ĩ	u ũ
Mid	e ẽ	o õ
Open	ɑ ɑ̃	

/ɑ/ is pronounced more fronted as [æ] before /r/ and /ʝ/.

Vowel nasality is phonemic in the language. Vowels can also carry three phonemic tones; high-falling, mid-level, and low-rising.

=== Consonants ===
		Bilabial	Alveolar	Retroflex	Palatal	Velar	Glottal
Nasal		m	n			ŋ	
Stop	voiceless	p	t			k	
Stop	voiced	b	d			g	
Stop	prenasal	ᵐb	ⁿd			ᵑɡ	
Fricative					ʝ		h
Approximant		w		ɭ			
Trill			r				

Stops /p t k/ can become aspirated as [pʰ tʰ kʰ].

Many speakers pronounce /t/ as [s] before /i/.

/d/ is realized as voiceless as [d̥] when occurring word-initially, and is palatalized as [dʲ] between /i/ and a word-final /ɑ/.

/r/ only occurs word-medially.

/b ɡ/ can be phonetically realized as fricatives intervocalically as [β ɣ].

== Number system ==
It has a pentadecimal (base-15) numeral system: ngui means 15, ngui ki means 15×2 = 30, and ngui ngui means 15×15 = 225.
