= Segestidea montana =

Scientific classification
- Domain: Eukaryota
- Kingdom: Animalia
- Phylum: Arthropoda
- Class: Insecta
- Order: Orthoptera
- Suborder: Ensifera
- Family: Tettigoniidae
- Genus: Segestidea
- Species: S. montana

Binomial name
- Segestidea montana Willemse, 1979

Species of insect

Segestidea montana is a species of Asian bush crickets in the tribe Sexavini, which can defoliate crops such as karuka (Pandanus julianettii).
