= Pandanus brosimos =

Scientific classification
- Kingdom: Plantae
- Clade: Tracheophytes
- Clade: Angiosperms
- Clade: Monocots
- Order: Pandanales
- Family: Pandanaceae
- Genus: Pandanus
- Subgenus: Pandanus subg. Lophostigma
- Section: Pandanus sect. Karuka
- Subsection: Pandanus subsect. Karuka
- Species: P. brosimos

Binomial name
- Pandanus brosimos Merr. & L.M.Perry (1940)

Species of tree

Pandanus brosimos, the wild karuka, is a species of tree in the family Pandanaceae, endemic to New Guinea. Along with Pandanus julianettii, it is widely harvested in New Guinea as a traditional food source. Many local ethnic groups make use of pandanus languages (a special avoidance language) when harvesting the nuts.

It was first formally described by Elmer Drew Merrill and Lily May Perry in 1940.
