= Korean ginseng-harvesters' cant =

Traditional jargon of foragers

Korean ginseng-harvesters' cant (Korean: 심마니의 은어, 심마니말) are a collection of cants that are widely used by ginseng-harvesters (심마니; Simmani) when harvesting and looking for ginseng. In modern day, these cants are not used as much, though some harvesters still may use some of the jargon. However, due to modern laws protecting environmental areas where harvesters once worked, decline in wild ginseng and a decline of interest among younger generations regarding the harvest of ginseng, the number of ginseng-harvesters has declined, and so has the use and knowledge of the slang.

== History ==
Ginseng-harvesters are first recorded in the Veritable Records of the Joseon Dynasty as Sancheok during the rule of Seonjo of Joseon (Korean: 산척; Hanja: 山尺) and were quite acclaimed due to the quality of ginseng they harvested. Over time, these harvesters often formed secretive groups, which eventually led to the creation of unspoken and unique rules, manners and important practices and superstitions that were passed down. Eventually however, due to governmental policies on Ginseng harvesting, superstitious beliefs about mountain gods, and the need to keep information from other harvesters, unique jargons were eventually formed to allow communication to be done in secret.

== Examples ==
Although the jargon appears to have varied between regions and communities, words were generally coined through similar methods, such as the use of figurative language, onomatopoeia and sometimes even foreign loanwords (Manchu or Mandarin Chinese).

Many of the terms in the cant often relate to food, animals, ginseng sizes and nature-related terms. Ginseng were divided depending on the age of the plant, with terms existing for young (1 year old) ginseng (내피, naepi), 100–200 year old ginseng (오구, ogu) and 200–500 year old ginseng (육구).

Terms based on figurative language, such as 모새 (mosae, originally a dialectal term for sand, is used to refer to rice due to the similarities in their grainy natures) or 살피개 (eyes, literally 'thing that surveys things'), as well as onomatopoeic terms, such as 우워치 (uwochi, the uwo part of the word represents a cow's moo) and 끼아기 (kkiyagi, chicken), are frequently used.

Terms of foreign origin such as 무투 (mutu, from Chinese 木頭, meaning timber) and 우케 (uke, from the Manchu word for water ᠮᡠᡴᡝ, muke) are commonly used among northern ginseng-harvesters likely due to the foreign origin of the words making it harder for common people to decipher them.

Other unique terms include, 괭가리 (gwengari, moon), 안침하다 (anchimhada, to rest), 망 (mang, to be bigger than something) and 마대 (made, cane).

== See also ==
- Pandanus language
- Cant (language)
- Korean dialects
