= Wola people =

Indigenous group in Papua New Guinea

The Wola people are an indigenous group of the Southern Highlands Province of Papua New Guinea. They live in five valleys northeast of Lake Kutubu.

The Wola are sedentary and practice swidden agriculture. Their main staple is sweet potato; lesser staples are bananas and taro.

The Wola speak a variety of Mendi. Many Wola people are Christian, while also following traditional beliefs.
