= Purari River =

River in Papua New Guinea

Purari
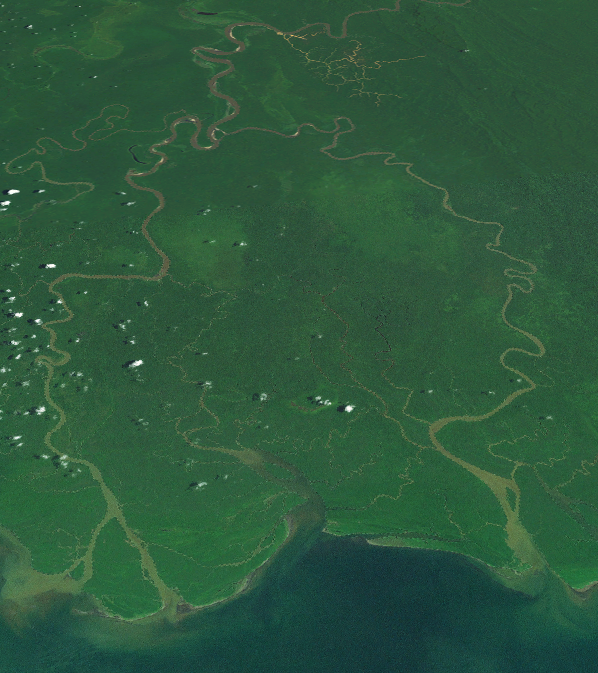
- The mouths of the Purari

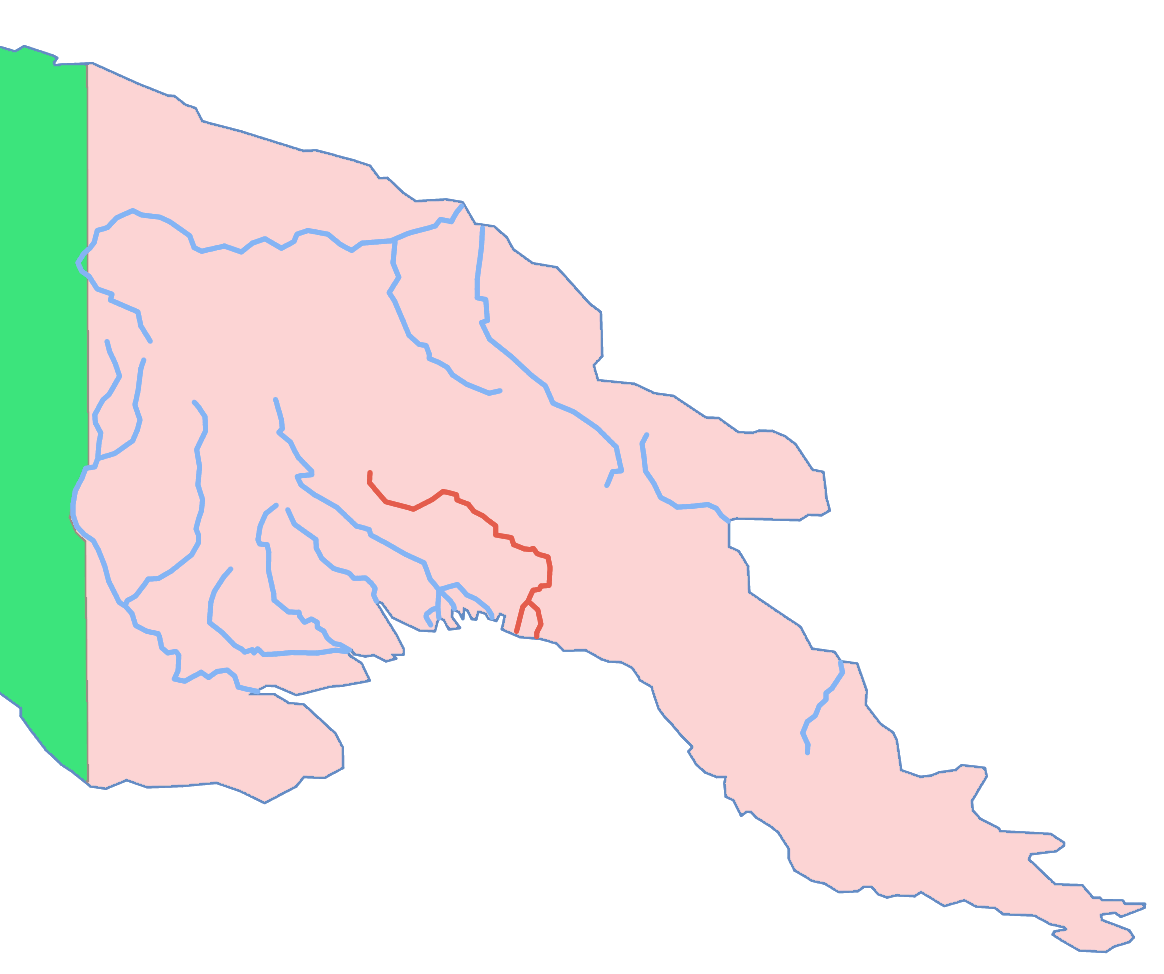
- Location of the Purari

Location
- Country: Papua New Guinea
- Region: Gulf

Physical characteristics
- Source
  - location: Papua New Guinea
  - coordinates: 6°24′S 144°15′E
  - elevation: 1,240 m (4,070 ft)
- Mouth
  - location: Gulf of Papua, Papua New Guinea
- Length: 630 km (390 mi)
- Basin size: 33,670 km^{2} (13,000 mi^{2})
- Discharge
  - location: Wabo Creek (Basin size: 28,738 km^{2} (11,096 sq mi)
  - average: 2,360 m^{3}/s (83,000 cu ft/s) 2,667 m^{3}/s (94,200 cu ft/s)
  - maximum: 6,000 m^{3}/s (210,000 cu ft/s)
- Discharge
  - location: Purari Delta, Gulf of Papua
  - average: 105 km^{3}/a (3,300 m^{3}/s)

The Purari (also known as Puraari) is a river that originates in the south central highlands especially in Tari Pori District of Hela Province of Papua New Guinea,(Local name Tagali River) flowing 630 kilometres (391 mi) though Gulf Province to the Gulf of Papua. The Purari has a 33,670 km^{2} (13,000 sq mi) drainage basin and is the third largest river in Papua New Guinea. The discharge varies through the year, averaging around 3,000 m^{3}/s (110,000 cu ft/s)–4,000 m^{3}/s (140,000 cu ft/s) at the delta.

== History ==
The headwaters of the river were charted in 1930 by Michael Leahy and Michael Dwyer.

== Geography ==
It is fed mainly by the Kaugel, Erave, Lai, Tua and Pio rivers, starting just south of Mount Karimui at the junction of the Tua and Pio rivers, where it flows through a quite spectacular gorge before flowing out into the lowlands and delta country closer to the coast. River becomes tidal at substantial distance from the waters of Gulf of Papua. The Purari is a heavy muddy brown from silts washed down from the mountains, and rises and falls constantly depending on local rainfall.

=== Delta ===
The Purari Delta is one of a number of large deltaic complexes which border the Gulf of Papua. Along with the Fly, the Kikori and many other rivers, the Purari drains the western and central highland region of Papua New Guinea. Upper sections of these rivers are located in highly mountainous terrain reaching 4,510 metres or 14,800 feet at Mt. Wilhelm, with steeply descending valleys debouching onto a deltaic plain 30 to 50 kilometres (19 to 31 mi) wide. Average annual rainfalls ranging from 2,000 to 8,500 millimetres (80 to 330 in) in the catchment of the Purari result in a mean annual discharge at delta of about 105 km^{3}/a (3,300 m^{3}/s), carrying 88.6 million m^{3}/year of sediment into the delta (Pickup 1980; this volume). These inputs provide the material for a major deltaic complex of global significance.

== Tributary ==
Purari River List of Tributaries by length.

- Waghi River 243 km (151 mi)
- Erave River 223.6 km (138.9 mi)
- Tua River 200 km (120 mi)
- Kaugel River 112.6 km (70.0 mi)
- Zogi River 76 km (47 mi)

== Biodiversity ==
The general area is heavy tropical jungle with high rainfall and abundant bird life.

== Economy ==
Along the river in various places there are small human populations, mostly subsistence villages. Dugout canoes are seen along the river from Wabo downstream, however population is sparse until you get closer to the coast where there are a few more villages.

=== Hydroelectric plant ===
The governments of Papua New Guinea and Government of Queensland have signed a Memorandum of Cooperation with PNG Energy Developments Ltd (PNG EDL) and Origin Energy (Origin) to support the potential development of a renewable hydro electricity project based on the Purari (Wabo Dam).

== See also ==
- Purari language
- Papua New Guinea
- Southern New Guinea freshwater swamp forests
