= Imbonggu Rural LLG =

Local-level government in Papua New Guinea

- Location within Papua New Guinea
- Coordinates: 6.11°S 144.08°E
- Country: Papua New Guinea
- Province: Southern Highlands Province
- Time zone: UTC+10 (AEST)

Imbonggu Rural LLG is a local-level government (LLG) of Southern Highlands Province, Papua New Guinea. The Kaugel language is spoken in the LLG.

== Wards ==
- 01. Kisenapoi
- 02. Moka 1
- 03. Orei 1
- 04. Kumunge
- 05. Beechwood 1
- 06. Koropangi
- 07. Beechwood 2
- 08. Kume 1
- 09. Kume 2
- 10. Tona
- 11. Piambil 1
- 12. Piambil 2
- 13. Parare 1
- 14. Papare 1/Nagop 1
- 15. Papare 2/ Nagop 2
- 16. Orei 2
- 17. Moka 2
- 18. Kisenapoi 2/Puglupiri
- 19. Tukupangi
- 20. Nagop 3
