= Wiru Rural LLG =

Local-level government in Papua New Guinea

- Location within Papua New Guinea
- Coordinates: 6.48°S 144.29°E
- Country: Papua New Guinea
- Province: Southern Highlands Province
- Time zone: UTC+10 (AEST)

Wiru Rural LLG is a local-level government (LLG) of Southern Highlands Province, Papua New Guinea. The Wiru language is spoken in the LLG.

== Wards ==
- 01. Poloko 2
- 02. Poloko 1
- 03. Borona
- 04. Koiyapu
- 05. Poleya
- 06. Iaro 1
- 07. Iaro 2
- 08. Kalane
- 09. Kaluwe 1
- 10. Kaluwe 2
- 11. Weriko
- 12. Maubinin
- 13. Kerapali
- 14. Tunda
- 15. Timbikene 1
- 16. Timbikene 2
- 17. Pubi
- 18. Lawe
- 19. Timbari 1
- 20. Timbari 2
- 21. Wanu
- 22. Marapini
- 23. Undiyapu
- 24. Yakiliyapu
- 25. Yoka
- 26. Kuabini
- 27. Noiya
- 28. Taguru
- 29. Mamuane
- 33. Powe
- 34. Kengerene
