= Mehndi (disambiguation) =

Mehndi is the application of henna as a temporary form of skin decoration.

Mehndi may also refer to:

== Film and television ==
- Mehndi (1958 film), a 1958 Indian Hindi-language film
- Mehndi (1998 film), a 1998 Indian Bollywood drama film
- Mehndi (TV series), a 2003 Pakistani television series that aired on PTV

== Other uses ==
- Daler Mehndi (born 1967), bhangra/pop singer from India
- Mehndi party

== See also ==
- Mendi (disambiguation)
- "Mehndi Laga Ke Rakhna", a song by Jatin–Lalit, Lata Mangeshkar and Udit Narayan from the 1995 Indian film Dilwale Dulhania Le Jayenge
- Mehndi Tere Naam Ki, a 2002 Indian television series
- Mehndi Hai Rachne Waali, a 2021 Indian television series
- Mehndi Waley Hath, a 2000 Pakistani film
- Mehboob Ki Mehndi, a 1971 Indian film
- Masala! Mehndi! Masti!, a festival in Toronto
