= Mendi Airport =

Airport in Mendi, Southern Highlands, Papua New Guinea

- IATA: MDU; ICAO: AYMN

Summary
- Location: Mendi, Papua New Guinea
- Elevation AMSL: 5,680 ft (1,730 m)
- Coordinates: 06°08′51.86″S 143°39′25.79″E

Map
- Location of airport in Papua New Guinea

Runways
Direction	Length		Surface
Direction	ft	m	Surface
17/35	4,411	1,344	Asphalt
- Source: World Aero Data

Mendi Airport (IATA: MDU, ICAO: AYMN) is an airport in Mendi, Papua New Guinea. It is managed by the state-owned National Airports Corporation.

== Airlines and destinations ==
Air Niugini connects Mendi Airport to Port Moresby International Airport.
