= Kaugel River =

River in Papua New Guinea

- Location within Papua New Guinea

Location
- Country: Papua New Guinea
- Region: Western Highlands Province

Physical characteristics
- Source
  - location: Papua New Guinea
- Mouth
  - coordinates: 6°20′34″S 144°32′31″E
- Length: 112.6 km (70.0 mi)

The Kaugel River is a river in Western Highlands Province, Papua New Guinea. With a total length of 112.6 km (70.0 mi) it is one of the major tributary of Purari River.

== See also ==
- List of rivers of Papua New Guinea
- Kaugel language
- Kaugel River languages
