= Kaugel language =

Hagen language of Papua New Guinea

Kaugel
- Kakoli
- Native to: Papua New Guinea
- Region: Southern Highlands Province
- Native speakers: (77,000 cited 2000 census)
- Language family: Trans–New Guinea: Chimbu–Wahgi; Hagen; Kaugel

Language codes
- ISO 639-3: Either: imo – Ibo Ugu (Imbo Ungu) ubu – Ubu Ugu (Umbu Ungu)
- Glottolog: auag1234
- Coordinates: 6°8′S 144°1′E

Kaugel (Gawigl) is one of the languages spoken in the Southern Highlands province of Papua New Guinea. Native speakers call the area on the Southern Highlands side of the Kaugel River from the Western Highlands province home.

Dialects are Aua (Ibo Ugu, Imbo Ungu, Imbongu) and Gawil (Umbo Ungu, Kakoli).

Kaugel counts with a base-24 system in cycles of 4. The word for 4 is also the word for hand in reference to the four fingers.

A translation of the New Testament was published in 1997 and is currently available online.

Imbongu has a pandanus language used during karuka harvest.
