= Mendi (barque) =

Mendi was a barque. Like most ships serving Liberia, it was black-owned, in this case by J. D. Johnson, Turpin, and Dunbar. Available documentation shows that at least between 1856 and 1859, it sailed regularly, carrying Black passengers and exported goods, between New York and Monrovia, Liberia. In a sailing of 1856 the ship carried 6 cabin passengers, including two ministers and two medical students, and 5 steerage passengers.

A distinguished passenger was Martin Delany, who on May 24, 1859, sailed from New York on Mendi, seeking to explore the Niger River. Accompanying him as far as Monrovia, Liberia, was Reverend William C. Munroe. Munroe had been with Delany at John Brown's 1858 planning conference in Chatham, Ontario; in fact he was elected its president.
