= Centres of Plant Diversity =

Initiative to classify biodiverse areas

Centres of Plant Diversity (CPD) was established in 1988 as a joint classification initiative between the World Wildlife Fund (WWF) and the International Union for Conservation of Nature intended to identify the areas in the world that are of the highest conservation value in terms of protecting the highest number of plant species. In 1998 there were 234 Centers of Plant Diversity registered across the globe, each bearing a rich diversity of endemic plant species that are of great value to humans and their native ecosystems that tend to be under unique edaphic conditions. Many CPD's are enlisted as a part of a legally protected area though they do not necessarily have legal protection automatically assigned to them. A CPD Is recognised primarily as a portion of a greater protected area that holds particularly significant biodiversity, likely to have a high number of irreplaceable plant species which are of high vulnerability.

== See also ==
- World Wildlife Fund
- International Union for Conservation of Nature
- Protected areas
- Biodiversity
