= Lembena language =

Language

Lembena
- Native to: Papua New Guinea
- Region: East Sepik Province
- Native speakers: (1,800 cited 2000 census)
- Language family: Engan: North Engan; Lembena

Language codes
- ISO 639-3: leq
- Glottolog: lemb1266

Lembena, also known as Lembena Pii, Nanimba Pii, Uyalipa Pii, or Wapi Pii, is an Engan language spoken in Papua New Guinea.

== Phonology ==
Lembena has five vowels: /a, e, i, o, u/.

Consonants
		Bilabial	Alveolar	Palatal	Velar
Nasal		m	n	ɲ	
Stop	voiceless	p	t		k
Stop	voiced	b	d		g
Fricative			s		
Lateral			l	ʎ	
Semivowel				j	w

The sequence /di/ becomes a voiced prenasalized postalveolar affricate /ⁿd͡ʒ/ when followed by a vowel other than /i/.
