= Kewa language =

Engan language spoken in Papua New Guinea

Kewa
- Region: Southern Highlands, Papua New Guinea
- Native speakers: (100,000 cited 2001 census)
- Language family: Engan: South; Kewa

Language codes
- ISO 639-3: Variously: kjy – Erave (South) kjs – East kew – Pasuma (West)
- Glottolog: kewa1250

Kewa is an Engan language complex of the Southern Highlands province of Papua New Guinea. A dictionary of the western dialect of Kewa has been compiled by Franklin & Franklin (1978).

== Phonology ==
=== Consonants ===
		Labial	Alveolar	Palatal	Velar
Plosive	plain	p	t	c	k ɡ
Plosive	prenasal	ᵐb	ⁿd		ᵑɡ
Fricative		(ɸ)	s		(x)
Nasal		m	n	ɲ	
Tap			ɾ		
Approximant		w	l	j	

- /p, k/ can also be heard as fricatives [ɸ, x]. Other realizations of /k/ are [kx], or [h] in the south dialect.
- /c/ can also be heard as [tʃ].
- /s/ may also be fronted as [s̪] when before /a/.
- Common realizations of /l, ɾ/ are retroflex sounds [ɭ̆, ɽ]. /l/ may also be heard as a flap [ɺ].
- /ɾ/ can also be heard as a trill [r] in the southeast dialect.

=== Vowels ===
	Front	Central	Back
High	i		u
Mid	e	ə	o
Low		a	

== Kewa pandanus register ==
Kewa's elaborate pandanus avoidance register, which is used only in the forest during the karuka harvest, has been extensively documented. The grammar is regularized and the vocabulary is restricted, with about a thousand words that differ from normal language. This was first described by Karl J. Franklin in 1972.

Pandanus-register words have a broader semantic scope. For example, yoyo, a reduplication of yo 'leaf', refers to hair, ear, breast, and scrotum, all things which hang from the body as pandanus leaves hang from the tree. Palaa, 'limb,' (either thigh or branch) is used for any reference to trees, including root, firewood, and fire. (Even in normal Kewa, repena means both 'tree' and 'fire'.) Maeye or 'crazy' refers to any non-human animal except dogs. It contrasts with the rational world of humans.

Many words are coined from Kewa morphology but have idiosyncratic meanings in the forest. Aayagopa, from aa 'man', yago 'fellow', and pa 'to do, to make', refers to man, knee, skin, and neck. Many idiosyncratic phrases are then built on this word. For example, ni madi aayagopa-si (I carry man-dim) means "my father".

The grammar has also been simplified. Clause-linking morphology is lost and replaced by simple juxtaposition of the clauses. In standard Kewa, there are two sets of verbal endings, one indicating actions done for the speaker's benefit. That set is missing from the pandanus language. The other inflection differs somewhat. For example, the forms of 'to be' are:

	Normal Kewa			Pandanus register		
	Singular	Dual	Plural	Singular	Dual	Plural
1st person	ni pi	saa pipa	niaa pima	ni mupi	saa mupapana	niaa mupapana
2nd person	ne pi			ne mupa		
3rd person	nipu pia		nimu pimi	aayagopa mupia		aayagopanu pupipa

(The -nu in aayagopanu is a collective suffix.)
