= Upper Mendi Rural LLG =

Local-level government in Papua New Guinea

- Country: Papua New Guinea
- Province: Southern Highlands Province
- Time zone: UTC+10 (AEST)

Upper Mendi Rural LLG is a local-level government (LLG) of Southern Highlands Province, Papua New Guinea. The people living there speak at last 4 different languages: Tambul, Mendi, Ialibu and Engan. It has an estimated population of over 40,000 people.

== Wards ==
- 01. Abua 1
- 02. Abua 2
- 03. Pongai
- 04. Wagia
- 05. Koen
- 06. Enep/Dimifa
- 07. Kuma 1
- 08. Kundaga
- 09. Birop 1
- 10. Birop 2
- 11. Birop 3
- 12. Karel 1
- 13. Karel 2
- 14. Kuma 2
- 15. Egari
- 16. Mogol
- 17. Kelta
- 18. Nene
- 19. Abua 3
- 20. Mungura
- 21. Sol
- 22. Kambai 1
- 23. Kambai 2
- 24. Waparaga
- 25. Komia 1
- 26. Komia 2
- 27. Yare
- 28. Semera
- 29. Kerenda
