= Andrew Strathern =

British anthropologist (1939–2026)

Andrew Jamieson Strathern (19 January 1939 – 1 April 2026) was a British anthropologist.

== Life and career ==
Strathern earned a doctorate at the University of Cambridge. He taught at the University of Pittsburgh where he served as the Andrew Mellon Professor of Anthropology.

He was married to Pamela J. Stewart, a fellow anthropologist employed at Pitt. A collection of their joint work is held at the University of Pittsburgh as the Pamela J. Stewart and Andrew J. Strathern Archive, and at the University of California, San Diego, as the Strathern (Andrew) and Pamela J. Stewart Photographs and Audiorecordings. Strathern was a fellow of the Association for Social Anthropology in Oceania. He was previously married to Marilyn Strathern.

On 21 September 2026, it was announced that Strathern had died in Pittsburgh. He was 87.

== Selected publications ==
- Strathern, Andrew (1971). The Rope of Moka: Big-men and Ceremonial Exchange in Mount Hagen, New Guinea. Cambridge University Press. ISBN 9780521099578.
- Strathern, Andrew; Strathern, Marilyn (1971). Self Decoration In Mount Hagen. Backworth. ISBN 9780715605165.
- Strathern, Andrew (1972). One Father, One Blood: Descent and Group Structure Among the Melpa People. Australian National University Research School of Social Sciences. ISBN 9780708106990.
- Strathern, Andrew (1979). Ongka: A Self Account By A New Guinea Big Man. Palgrave Macmillan. ISBN 9780312585662.
- Strathern, Andrew (1982). Inequality in New Guinea Highlands Societies. Cambridge University Press. ISBN 9780521244893.
- Strathern, Andrew (1984). A Line of Power. Tavistock Publications. ISBN 9780422789004.
- Strathern, Andrew (1996). Body Thoughts. University of Michigan Press. ISBN 9780472065806.
- Strathern, Andrew; Stewart, Pamela (1999). Curing and Healing: Medical Anthropology in Global Perspective. Carolina Academic Press. ISBN 9780890899427.
- Strathern, Andrew; Stewart, Pamela (2000). Arrow Talk: Transaction, Transition, and Contradiction in New Guinea Highlands History. Kent State University Press. ISBN 9780873386616.
- Strathern, Andrew; Stewart, Pamela (2010). Kinship in Action: Self and Group. Routledge. ISBN 9780131844841.
- Strathern, Andrew; Stewart, Pamela, et al. (2017), Oceania:An Introduction to the Cultures and Identities of Pacific Islanders. 2nd ed. Carolina Academic Press. ISBN 978-1-53100-409-5
