= Kawelka people =

People of Papua New Guinea

The Kawelka people are a tribe who live in the Western Highlands Province of Papua New Guinea. The Kawelka are largely based in the immediate area surrounding the Wahgi Valley, located in the New Guinea Highlands. The Kawelka also have historical ties to the Kuk Swamp.

== History ==
According to the founding legend of the Kawelka, the tribe originates from a region known as Koumpouppukl. Over the course of the Kawelka's history, they have engaged in numerous conflicts with neighbouring tribes, during which several Kawelka clans, specifically the Muntimbo, Kurungaper and Kumuntmbo clans, have been wiped out.

== Language ==
The Kawelka tribe speaks the Melpa language. There are also other related Melpa-speaking tribes.
