= Mount Hagen =

Mount Hagen Maun Hagen (Tok Pisin) The Heart of the Highlands
- Town
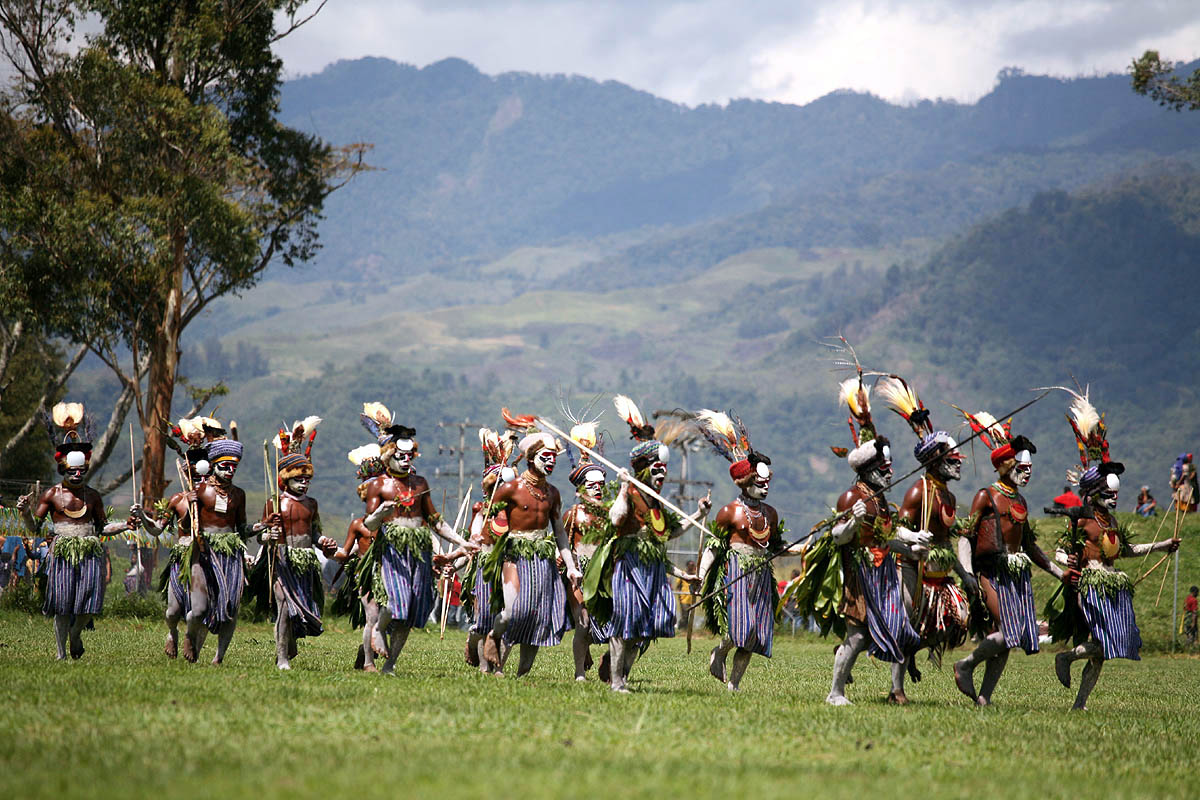
- Mt Hagen Cultural Show, one of the largest annual cultural events in Papua New Guinea

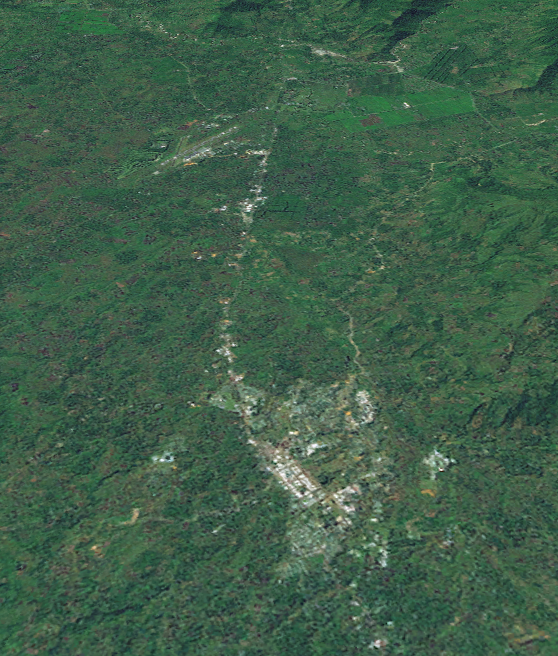
- Satellite view

- Location in Papua New Guinea
- Coordinates: 5°51′36″S 144°14′24″E
- Country: Papua New Guinea
- Province: Western Highlands Province
- District: Mount Hagen District
- Established: 1934

Area
  - Land: 8,500 km^{2} (3,300 sq mi)
- Elevation: 1,677 m (5,502 ft)

Population (2013)
  - Total: 46,256
  - Density: 5.4/km^{2} (14/sq mi)
- Time zone: UTC+10 (AEST)
- Main languages: Melpa, Tok Pisin, English
- Climate: Cfb

Mount Hagen (Tok Pisin: Maun Hagen) is the third largest city in Papua New Guinea, with a population of 46,250. It is the capital of the Western Highlands Province and is located in the large fertile Wahgi Valley in central mainland Papua New Guinea, at an elevation of 1,677 m (5,502 ft).

The Highlands Highway is the main arterial route to connect Mount Hagen with the coastal cities of Lae and Madang.

The city is named after the old eroded volcano Mount Hagen, located about 24 kilometres (15 mi) to the north-west. The volcano was named after the German colonial officer Curt von Hagen (1859–1897).

== History ==
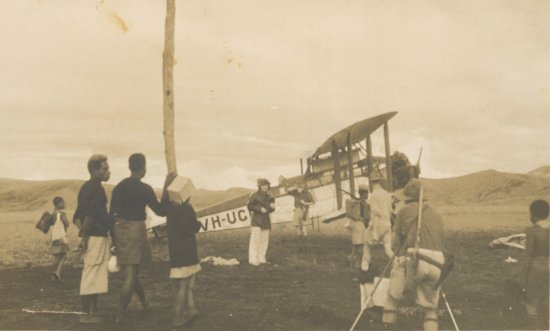
The plane, 'Canberra', before the 1933 expedition to Mount Hagen

In 1933, Mick Leahy, brother Dan Leahy, and government officer Jim Taylor conducted an aerial reconnaissance of the highlands and discovered the huge and heavily populated Wahgi Valley. A short time later they walked in with a well supplied patrol and became the first westerners to come into contact with the tribes that are now in the location of Mount Hagen. The first patrol built an airstrip at Kelua, a short distance from modern Mount Hagen. From 1934, a new airstrip, the "Mogei Drome" or "Mogai Aerodrome", was located on a site where the future town was formed. The first flight arrived here on 1 April 1934, piloted by Bob Gurney, with the first airmail leaving the next day. Later, this airstrip was to become the main street passing by Chinatown and the airstrip (current) was moved 15 minutes out of town.

== Culture ==
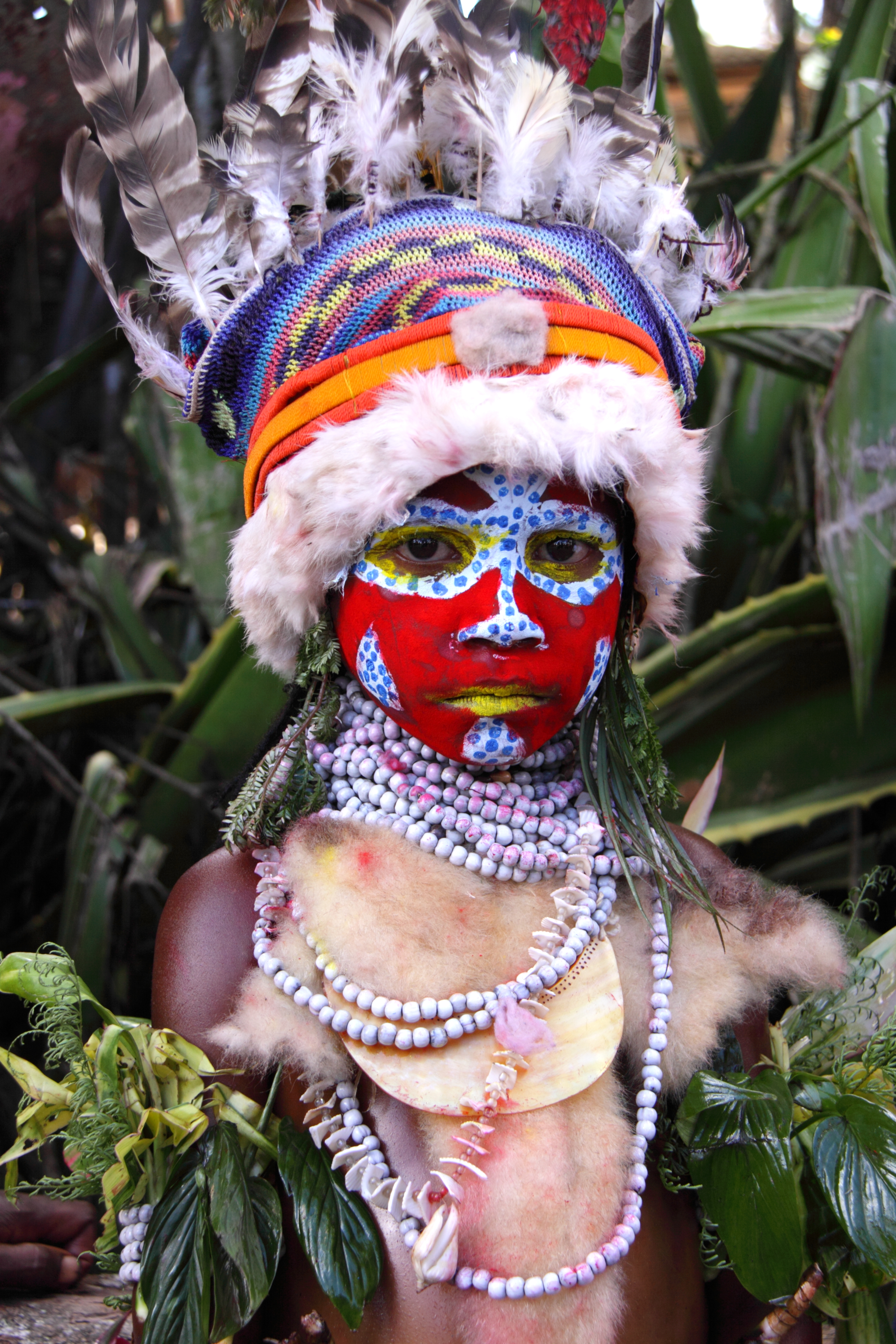
Mount Hagen Cultural Show in 2009

Each year, Mount Hagen hosts the Mount Hagen Cultural Show, one of the largest cultural events in Papua New Guinea. Various regional, provincial, even national tribal dance groups gather to celebrate their cultural heritage in the form of sing-sing. It is also one of the biggest tourist attractions of the country. Its near the Baiyer District which hosts the biggest collection of birds and wildlife in Papua New Guinea, the Baiyer River Sanctuary. The Baiyer River Sanctuary was a popular tourist attraction in the 1970's up until the mid 1990's as mismanagement of the once popular tourist attraction led to the closure of this zoo.

There are four electorates in Western Highlands Province:

1. Mul Baiyer Lumusa
2. Dei Council
3. Hagen Central
4. Tambul Nebliyer

The total population of Western Highlands now stands at around 950,000.

Traditional culture and beliefs remain strong in Mount Hagen and its surrounds. In 2009, and again 2013, local women were reportedly burned alive after being accused of sorcery. Recent thinking links the upsurge in such accusations with poor development outcomes in Papua New Guinea and the erosion of social capital through fear and mistrust.

Kuk Swamp, an archaeological site listed as World Heritage Site, is located some 12–13 km northeast of Mount Hagen.

== Transport ==
Mount Hagen Airport is located at Kagamuga, a satellite town 15 minutes drive from the centre of Mount Hagen. It is an international airport although flights into and out of it are not always available to the public. The airport altitude is 1,635 metres (5,364 ft) above sea level. Currently, Hevilift operates a charter service using ATR-42 and Twin Otter aircraft from Cairns, Queensland, for mine workers at the Porgera Gold Mine in Enga Province. Asia Pacific Airlines also fly Dash 8s regularly to Tabubil, their hub, to service the Ok Tedi Mine. Air Niugini also service Mount Hagen, with regular Fokker 100 and Dash 8 services to destinations such as Port Moresby, Moro and Cairns. PNG Air also operate regular services to and from Mt Hagen to Port Moresby, Tabubil, Kiunga and Wewak. Near the airport is Airport Hotel.

From time to time, the combination of altitude, midday temperatures and runway length restrict takeoff weights for domestic flights out of Mount Hagen.

Mount Hagen is connected via the Highlands Highway to the city of Lae and other provincial capitals such as Madang, Goroka, Wabag, Mendi and Kundiawa. The road between Mount Hagen and all these centres is theoretically sealed, although frequent landslides and general deterioration can lead to parts of the road becoming unsealed or rough.

Travel from Mt Hagen along the Highlands Highway by using the popular PMV buses which operate as taxis or hire a car from the numerous hire car companies within Mt Hagen. Because of the difficult road conditions of the Highlands Highway, it is advisable to use four-wheel drive cars.

== Climate ==
Mount Hagen has a subtropical highland climate (Köppen climate classification: Cfb).

Climate data for Mount Hagen
Month	Jan	Feb	Mar	Apr	May	Jun	Jul	Aug	Sep	Oct	Nov	Dec	Year
Mean daily maximum °C (°F)	22 (72)	22 (72)	22 (72)	22 (72)	21 (70)	21 (70)	21 (70)	22 (72)	22 (72)	22 (72)	22 (72)	22 (72)	22 (72)
Mean daily minimum °C (°F)	15 (59)	15 (59)	15 (59)	15 (59)	15 (59)	15 (59)	14 (57)	14 (57)	14 (57)	15 (59)	15 (59)	15 (59)	15 (59)
Average rainfall mm (inches)	210.0 (8.27)	226.1 (8.90)	221.4 (8.72)	246.0 (9.69)	177.6 (6.99)	129.6 (5.10)	89.9 (3.54)	81.1 (3.19)	104.1 (4.10)	150.4 (5.92)	194.1 (7.64)	214.6 (8.45)	2,044.9 (80.51)
Average rainy days	14.2	14.5	14.9	14.3	11.9	9.9	8.7	8.3	8.7	10.9	11.5	13.0	140.8
Mean monthly sunshine hours	155	113	124	120	124	120	124	124	120	155	150	155	1,584
Source: https://weatherspark.com/y/144241/Average-Weather-in-Mount-Hagen-Papua-New-Guinea-Year-Round

== Twin town ==
- Orange, Australia (New South Wales) since 1985

== See also ==
- Mount Hagen languages
