= Angal language =

Engan language of Papua New Guinea

Angal
- Mendi
- Region: Southern Highlands, Papua New Guinea
- Ethnicity: Wola etc.
- Native speakers: (80,000 cited 1994–2000)
- Language family: Engan: South; Angal

Language codes
- ISO 639-3: Variously: age – East aoe – Angal Enen (South) akh – Angal Heneng (West, Kaninja)
- Glottolog: anga1314

Angal, or Mendi, is an Engan language complex of the Southern Highlands province of Papua New Guinea.

Mendi has a pandanus language used during karuka harvest.
