= Southern Highlands Province =

Province in Papua New Guinea

Southern Highlands Province Sauten Hailans (Tok Pisin) Saden Halens (Angal Dialect)
- Southern Highlands Province
- Flag

- Southern Highlands Province in Papua New Guinea
- Coordinates: 6°10′S 143°20′E
- Country: Papua New Guinea
- Capital: Mendi
- Districts: List: Mendi-Munihu District; Imbonggu District; Kagua-Erave District; Ialibu-Pangia District; Nipa-Kutubu District

Government
  - Governor: William Powi

Area
  - Total: 15,089 km^{2} (5,826 sq mi)

Population (2021 census)
  - Total: 972,306
  - Density: 64.438/km^{2} (166.89/sq mi)
- Time zone: UTC+10 (AEST)
- HDI (2018): 0.479 low · 21st of 22

Southern Highlands is a province in Papua New Guinea. Its provincial capital is the town of Mendi. According to Papua New Guinea's national 2021 census, the total population of Southern Highlands province is 927,306.

== History ==
=== Separation of Hela Province ===
In July 2009, the Parliament of Papua New Guinea directed the creation of Hela Province from the Southern Highlands districts of Tari-Pori, Komo-Magarima, and Koroba-Kopiago. The province formally split from Southern Highlands on 17 May 2012.

== Geography ==
Near the provincial capital of Mendi lies Lake Kutubu, which is the second largest lake in Papua New Guinea. The lake is known for its biodiversity and in particular its endemic fish species.

Mount Giluwe lies along the border between the Southern Highlands Province and the Western Highlands province. At 4,367m (14,327ft), Mount Giluwe is the second tallest mountain in Papua New Guinea and the fifth tallest on the island of New Guinea.

=== Natural resources ===
As a region rich in energy resources, the Southern Highlands was at the centre of plans to construct a gas pipeline to pump natural gas to Queensland in north Australia. The project would have resulted in much needed revenue for Papua New Guinea, and as it was believed that the instability in the region could jeopardise the project, the national government decided to intervene by declaring a state of emergency. The move was supported by Parliament, although some criticism was leveled at the government for restricting press access to the region while the state of emergency was in force. The companies involved subsequently opted for the current PNG Gas project which has export facilities outside Port Moresby. This is operated by Esso Highlands, a subsidiary of Exxon Mobil Corporation, and was expected to begin production in 2014.

== Demographics ==
The Southern Highlands has more than eight groups of people. The Kutubu Bosavi are partly of the Huli tribes and coastal, they speak Hela and the Foe Faso languages. The Erave Samberigi people are of coastal or Papuan descent and speak their own language. Poroma, Nipa and Plato speak a Nongo-Naiko dialect, as do the Mendi people. The people surrounding Mt Giluwe and Ialibu speak the Umbu-Ungu dialect. Pangia and Kagua people speak two different languages. The Imboungu and some Ialibu people speak Kewabi languages. This shows that there are more than eight major languages and 18-24 different tribes that live in SHP. Some tribes extend all the way to the newly formed Hela province, Enga, Western Highlands Province, Gulf Province, Simbu Province and the Western Provinces.

=== Cultural regions ===
The Southern Highlands province is divided into roughly three distinct geographic regions:

- The West includes the Southern Highlands districts of Nipa, Mendi, Lai Valley, Imbogu (lower Mendi), Hela District of Magarima, Kutubu and part of Kendep (Enga Province). This region is primarily home to speakers of dialects of the Anggal Heneng language.
- The East includes the districts of Kagua, Ialibu, Pangia and Erave. This region is primarily home to speakers of the Imbongu, Kewa, and Wiru languages.
- The Lowlands stretch across the southern part of the Southern Highlands province from the volcanic peaks of Mount Bosavi to include the oilfields of Lake Kutubu, and includes the language groups of Biami, Foe, and Fasu.

== Administrative subdivisions ==
=== Districts and LLGs ===
There are five districts in the province and a total of twenty local level government (LLG) areas. For census purposes, the LLG areas are subdivided into wards and those into census units.

District	District capital	LLG name
Ialibu-Pangia District	Ialibu	East Pangia Rural
Ialibu-Pangia District	Ialibu	Ialibu Urban
Ialibu-Pangia District	Ialibu	Kewabi Rural
Ialibu-Pangia District	Ialibu	Wiru Rural
Imbonggu District	Imbonggu	Ialibu Basin Rural
Imbonggu District	Imbonggu	Imbonggu Rural
Imbonggu District	Imbonggu	Lower Mendi Rural
Kagua-Erave District	Kagua	Erave Rural
Kagua-Erave District	Kagua	Kagua Rural
Kagua-Erave District	Kagua	Kuare Rural
Kagua-Erave District	Kagua	Aiya Rural
Mendi-Munihu District	Mendi	Karints Rural
Mendi-Munihu District	Mendi	Lai Valley Rural
Mendi-Munihu District	Mendi	Mendi Urban
Mendi-Munihu District	Mendi	Upper Mendi Rural
Nipa-Kutubu District	Nipa	Lake Kutubu Rural
Nipa-Kutubu District	Nipa	Mount Bosavi Rural
Nipa-Kutubu District	Nipa	Nembi Plateau Rural
Nipa-Kutubu District	Nipa	Nipa Rural
Nipa-Kutubu District	Nipa	Poroma Rural

== Provincial leaders ==
The province was governed by a decentralized provincial administration, headed by a premier, from 1978 to 1995. Following reforms taking effect that year, the national government centralized the provincial government and replaced the office of premier with that of governor. The governorship is held by the winner of the province-wide seat in the National Parliament of Papua New Guinea.

=== Premiers (1978–1995) ===
Premier	Term
Andrew Andaija	1978–1980
Tegi Ebeial	1980–1985
Yaungtine Koromba	1985–1990
Albert Mokai	1990–1992
provincial government suspended	1992–1995

=== Governors (1995–present) ===
Governor	Term
Dick Mune	1995–1997
Anderson Agiru	1997–2000
Hami Yawari	2003–2006
Anderson Agiru	2007–2012
William Powi	2012–present

== Members of the National Parliament ==
The province and each district is represented by a Member of the National Parliament. There is one provincial electorate and each district is an open electorate.

Electorate	Member
Southern Highlands Provincial	William Powi
Ialibu-Pangia Open	Peter O'Neill
Imbonggu Open	Pila Niningi
Kagua-Erave Open	Maina Pano
Mendi Open	Raphael Tonpi
Nipa-Kutubu Open	Billy William M. Joseph

== Political unrest ==
=== 2006 state of emergency ===
On 1 August 2006, the government of Papua New Guinea declared a state of emergency in the country's Southern Highlands region. According to Prime Minister Sir Michael Somare, troops were deployed to restore 'law, order and good governance' in the region, following accusations of corruption, theft and misuse of government buildings at the hands of the regional government.

=== 2017 election dispute ===
William Powi's election as provincial governor was contested by his primary opponent, Pastor Bernard Peter Kaku. Kaku filed a lawsuit alleging that Powi was prematurely declared the victor after he had received a plurality, but not a majority of votes. In 2021, the National Court of Papua New Guinea ruled in favor of Kaku and suspended Powi as provincial governor until a recount could be completed. Ultimately, William Powi won re-election in 2022, before the suspension could become effective.

=== 2022 election-related violence ===
During the 2022 provincial election, fighting broke out between supporters of sitting Governor William Powi and those of various regional candidates.
