= List of cities and towns in Papua New Guinea =

List of PNG cities, towns, and villages

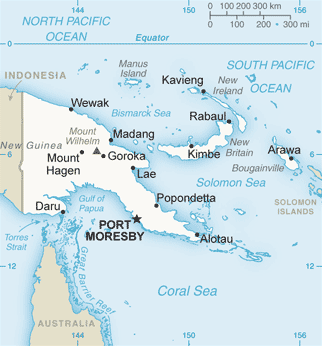
Map of Papua New Guinea

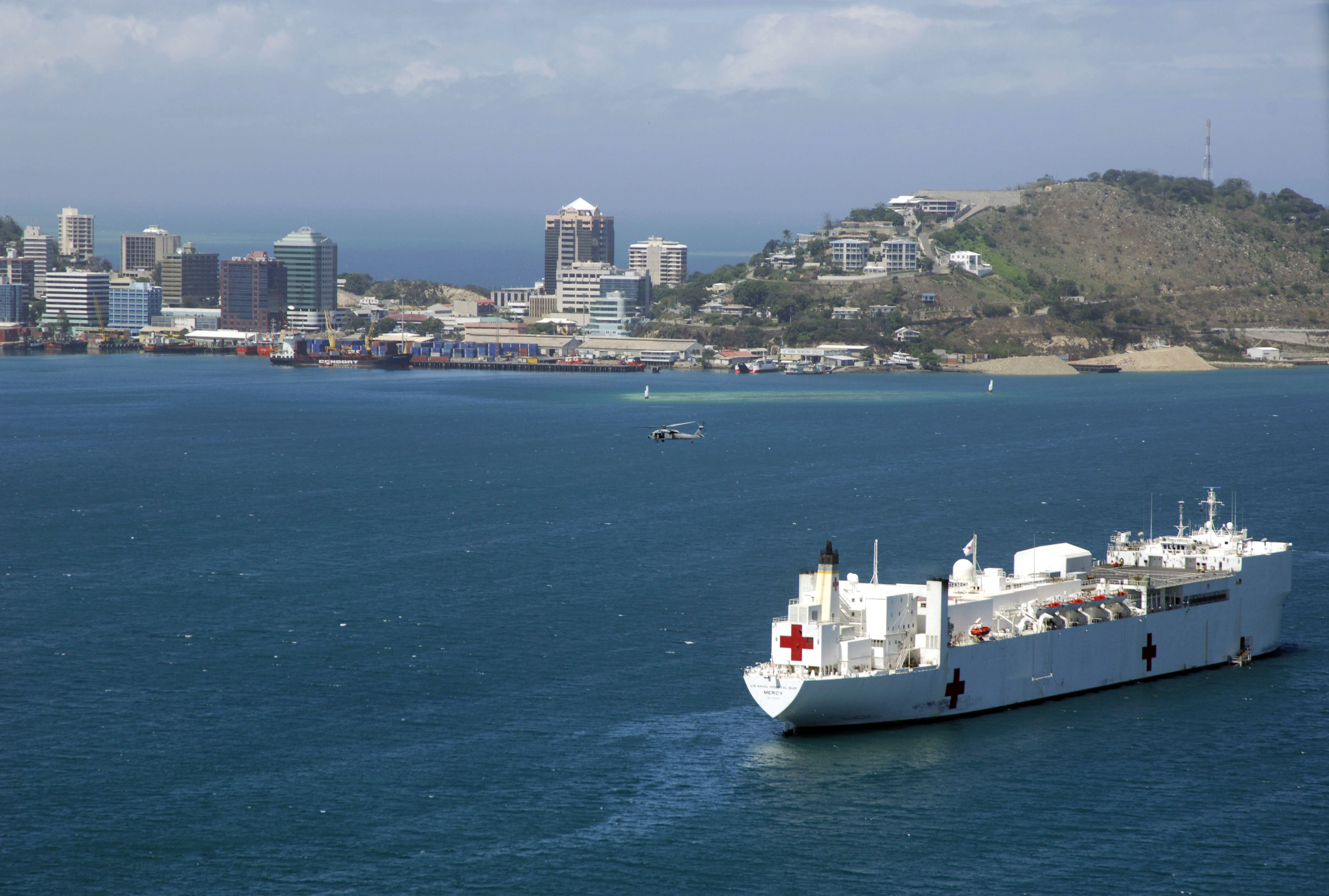
Port Moresby, Capital of Papua New Guinea

This is a list of cities, towns, and villages in Papua New Guinea.

== List ==
Papua New Guinea's three cities are Lae, Mount Hagen, and Port Moresby. The other settlements in the following list are towns and villages.

City/Town/Village	District	Province
Abau	Abau District	Central
Adumo		Eastern Highlands
Agaun		Milne Bay
Aiambak		Western
Aitape	Aitape-Lumi District	Sandaun (West Sepik)
Alekano	Gahuku	Eastern Highlands
Alexishafen		Madang
Alotau	Alotau District	Milne Bay
Ambunti	Ambunti-Dreikikir District	East Sepik
Angoram	Angoram District	East Sepik
Arawa	Central Bougainville District	Bougainville (North Solomons)
Asaro	Daulo District	Eastern Highlands
Awaba		Western
Baimuru	Kikori District	Gulf
Baiyer	Mul-Baiyer District	Western Highlands
Balimo	Middle Fly District	Western
Banz	North Waghi District	Western Highlands
Benabena		Eastern Highlands
Benna	Unggai-Benna District	Eastern Highlands
Bensbach		Western
Bereina	Kairuku-Hiri District	Central
Boana	Nawae District	Morobe
Bogia	Bogia District	Madang
Boridi		Central
Bosset		Western
Brahman		
Buin	South Bougainville District	Bougainville (North Solomons)
Buka	North Bougainville District	Bougainville (North Solomons)
Bulolo	Bulolo District	Morobe
Buna		Oro (Northern)
Chuave	Chuave District	Simbu (Chimbu)
Dagua	Wewak District	East Sepik
Dahamo		
Daru	South Fly District	Western
Dei	Dei District	Western Highlands
Efogi		Central
Fane	Goilala	Central
Ferguson	Esa'ala District	Milne Bay
Finschhafen	Finschhafen District	Morobe
Gagidu	Finschhafen District	Morobe
Gapun		
Gasmata	Kandrian-Gloucester District	West New Britain
Gona		Oro (Northern)
Goroka	Goroka District	Eastern Highlands
Gumine	Gumine District	Simbu (Chimbu)
Gusap		Morobe
Henganofi	Henganofi District	Eastern Highlands
Hogimiyau	Goroka District	Eastern Highlands
Hoskins	Talasea District	West New Britain
Hula	Abau District	Central
Ialibu	Ialibu-Pangia District	Southern Highlands
Ihu	Kikori District	Gulf
Imbonggu	Imbonggu District	Southern Highlands
Itokama		Oro (Northern)
Kabwum	Kabwum District	Morobe
Kagi		Central
Kagua	Kagua-Erave District	Southern Highlands
Kaiapit	Markham District	Morobe
Kainantu	Kainantu District	Eastern Highlands
Kamusi		Gulf
Kandep	Kandep District	Enga
Kandrian	Kandrian-Gloucester District	West New Britain
Karimui	Karimui-Nomane District	Simbu (Chimbu)
Karkar	Sumkar District	Madang
Kavieng	Kavieng District	New Ireland
Kelanoa		Morobe
Kerema	Kerema District	Gulf
Kerevat	Gazelle District	East New Britain
Kerowagi	Kerowagi District	Simbu (Chimbu)
Kieta	Central Bougainville District	Bougainville (North Solomons)
Kikori	Kikori District	Gulf
Kimbe	Talasea District	West New Britain
Kiriwina	Kiriwini-Goodenough District	Milne Bay
Kiunga	North Fly District	Western
Kokoda	Sohe District	Oro (Northern)
Kokopo	Kokopo District	East New Britain
Kompiam	Kompiam District	Enga
Kopiago	Koroba-Kopiago District	Southern Highlands
Krisa		Sandaun (West Sepik)
Kunaye (Lihir Island)		New Ireland
Kundiawa	Kundiawa-Gembogl District	Simbu (Chimbu)
Kwikila	Rigo District	Central
Lae	Lae District	Morobe
Lagaip	Lagaip-Porgera District	Enga
Lake Murray	Middle Fly District	Western
Lamari	Obura-Wonenara District	Eastern Highlands
Lido		Sandaun (West Sepik)
Londolovit (Lihir Island)		New Ireland
Lorengau	Manus District	Manus
Losuia (Kiriwina Island)	Kiriwini-Goodenough District	Milne Bay
Lufa	Lufa District	Eastern Highlands
Lusik		Madang
Madang	Madang District	Madang
Magarima	Komo-Magarima District	Southern Highlands
Manari		Central
Manguna		East New Britain
Manki		Morobe
Maprik	Maprik District	East Sepik
Marienberg	Angoram District	East Sepik
Medibur	Bogia District	Madang
Mendi	Mendi-Munihu District	Southern Highlands
Menyamya	Menyamya District	Morobe
Minj	Anglimp-South Waghi District	Western Highlands
Moro		Southern Highlands
Mount Hagen	Mount Hagen District	Western Highlands
Murua	Samarai-Murua District	Milne Bay
Nadzab		Morobe
Namatanai	Namatanai District	New Ireland
Nebilyer	Tambul-Nebilyer District	Western Highlands
Ningerum	North Fly District	Western
Nipa	Nipa-Kutubu District	Southern Highlands
Nuku	Nuku District	Sandaun (West Sepik)
Obo		Western
Okapa	Okapa District	Eastern Highlands
Olsobip	North Fly District	Western
Ononge		Central
Panguna		Bougainville (North Solomons)
Pasi		Sandaun (West Sepik)
Pingirip	Mendi-Munihu District	Southern Highlands Province
Pomio	Pomio District	East New Britain
Pongani		Oro (Northern)
Popondetta	Ijivitari District	Oro (Northern)
Porgera	Lagaip-Porgera District	Enga
Port Moresby	National Capital District	National Capital District
Rabaul	Rabaul District	East New Britain
Rai Coast	Rai Coast District	Madang
Saidor	Rai Coast District	Madang
Salamaua	Huon District	Morobe
Salamo		Milne Bay
Samarai	Samarai-Murua District	Milne Bay
Samberigi		Southern Highlands
Sanananda		Oro (Northern)
Sangara	Sohe District	Oro (Northern)
Sasereme		Gulf
Sialum	Tewae-Siassi District	Morobe
Simbai	Middle Ramu District	Madang
Sio		Morobe
Soputa		Oro (Northern)
Suki		Western
Tabibuga	Jimi District	Western Highlands
Tabubil	North Fly District	Western
Tadji		Sandaun (West Sepik)
Tapini	Goilala District	Central
Talasea	Talasea District	West New Britain
Tari	Tari-Pori District	Southern Highlands
Telefomin	Telefomin District	Sandaun (West Sepik)
Torokina	South Bougainville District	Bougainville (North Solomons)
Tsili Tsili		Morobe
Tufi		Oro (Northern)
Ukarumpa		Eastern Highlands
Usino	Usino Bundi District	Madang
Vanimo	Vanimo-Green River District	Sandaun (West Sepik)
Vivigani (Goodenough Is.)	Kiriwini-Goodenough District	Milne Bay
Wabag	Wabag District	Enga
Wabo		Gulf
Wamira	Rabaraba	Milne Bay
Wanigela		Oro (Northern)
Wapenamanda	Kandep District	Enga
Wasu	Tewae-Siassi District	Morobe
Wau	Bulolo District	Morobe
Wewak	Wewak District	East Sepik
Wipim	South Fly District	Western
Woitape	Goilala District	Central
Wosera	Wosera-Gawi District	East Sepik
Yangoru	Yangoru-Saussia District	East Sepik
Yonggomugl	Sina Sina-Yonggomugl District	Simbu (Chimbu)

== See also ==
- Districts of Papua New Guinea
- List of cities and towns in Papua New Guinea by population
- List of cities in Oceania by population
- Local-level governments of Papua New Guinea
- Provinces of Papua New Guinea
- Regions of Papua New Guinea

== Citations ==
- "Final Figures". www.nso.gov.pg. 2011 National Population and Housing Census: Ward Population Profile. Port Moresby: National Statistical Office, Papua New Guinea. 2014.
- United Nations in Papua New Guinea (2018). "Papua New Guinea - Postal codes and Coordinates". Humanitarian Data Exchange. 1.31.9.
