= Administrative divisions of Papua New Guinea =

For administrative purposes, Papua New Guinea (PNG) is divided into administrative divisions called regions and provinces. Papua New Guinea is divided into four regions and 22 province-level divisions: 20 provinces plus the autonomous region (Bougainville) and the National Capital District.

Each province is divided into one or more districts, which in turn are divided into one or more local level government areas (LLGs).

== Regions ==
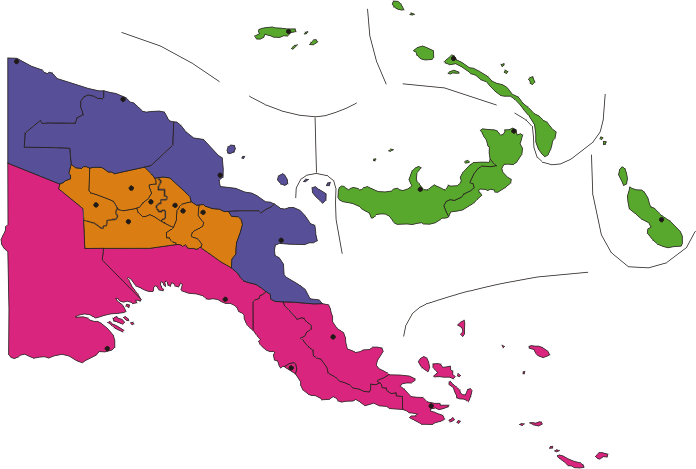
Highlands Region Islands Region Momase Region Southern Region

PNG is divided into four regions. While not official administrative divisions for most purposes, regions are quite significant in daily life. People generally identify strongly with their region, and inter-region rivalries can be intense.

There are four regions, each of which comprises a number of provinces:

- Highlands Region: Hela, Jiwaka, Simbu, Eastern Highlands, Enga, Southern Highlands, and Western Highlands.
- Islands Region: East New Britain, Manus, New Ireland, North Solomons (Bougainville), and West New Britain.
- Momase Region: East Sepik, Madang, Morobe, and West Sepik (Sandaun).
- Southern Region: Central, Gulf, Milne Bay, Northern Province (Oro), Western (Fly), and the National Capital District.

Momase is a recently devised portmanteau word which combines the first two letters of Morobe, Madang, and Sepik.

== Provinces ==
PNG is also divided into 22 province-level divisions: 20 provinces plus the autonomous region (Bougainville) and the National Capital District.

Provinces are the primary administrative divisions of PNG. Provincial governments are branches of the national government - PNG is not a federation of provinces. Each province forms a provincial electorate for the national parliament. The provinces are as follows:

1. Central
2. Chimbu (Simbu)
3. Eastern Highlands
4. East New Britain
5. East Sepik
6. Enga
7. Gulf
8. Madang
9. Manus
10. Milne Bay
11. Morobe
12. New Ireland
13. Northern (Oro Province)
14. Bougainville (North Solomons)
15. Southern Highlands
16. Western Province (Fly River)
17. Western Highlands
18. West New Britain
19. West Sepik (Sandaun)
20. National Capital District
21. Hela
22. Jiwaka

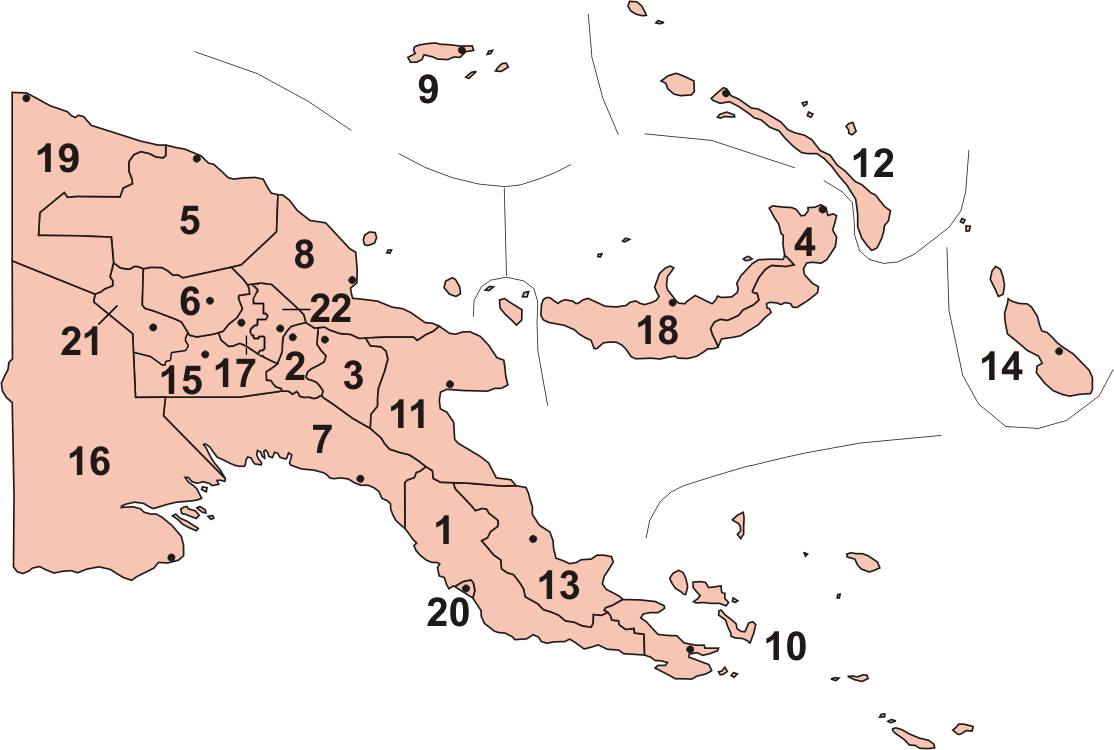
Provinces of Papua New Guinea

== Districts ==
Each province is divided into one or more districts. As of 2011, there were 87 districts in PNG.

Each district forms an open electorate for the national parliament, with the exception of the National Capital District, which is further divided into three open electorates.

== Local-level governments ==
Each district is divided into one or more Local-Level Government areas, with the exception of the National Capital District.

There are 326 LLGs comprising 6,112 wards as of 2018.
