= Madang Urban LLG =

Local-level government in Papua New Guinea

- Location within Papua New Guinea
- Coordinates: 5.232883°S 145.788392°E
- Country: Papua New Guinea
- Province: Madang Province
- District: Madang District
- City: Madang

Area
  - Total: 17.85 km^{2} (6.89 sq mi)

Population (2021 Estimate)
  - Total: 53,618
  - Density: 3,004/km^{2} (7,780/sq mi)
- Time zone: UTC+10 (AEST)

Madang Urban LLG is a local-level government (LLG) of Madang Province, Papua New Guinea.

== Wards ==
- 81. Madang Urban
