= Districts of Papua New Guinea =

Second-level administrative division

This page is a list of districts of Papua New Guinea.

== Administrative divisions ==
On the highest level, Papua New Guinea is divided into 4 regions, which are Highlands, Islands, Momase, and Southern regions.

Below, Papua New Guinea has 22 province-level divisions: 20 integrated provinces, the autonomous province of North Solomons (Bougainville) and the National Capital District.

Each province has one or more districts, and each district has one or more local-level government (LLG) areas. For census purposes, the LLG areas are subdivided into wards and those into census units.

Wards typically consist of a few hundred to a few thousand individuals, and are the lowest level of government administration under local-level governments (LLGs).

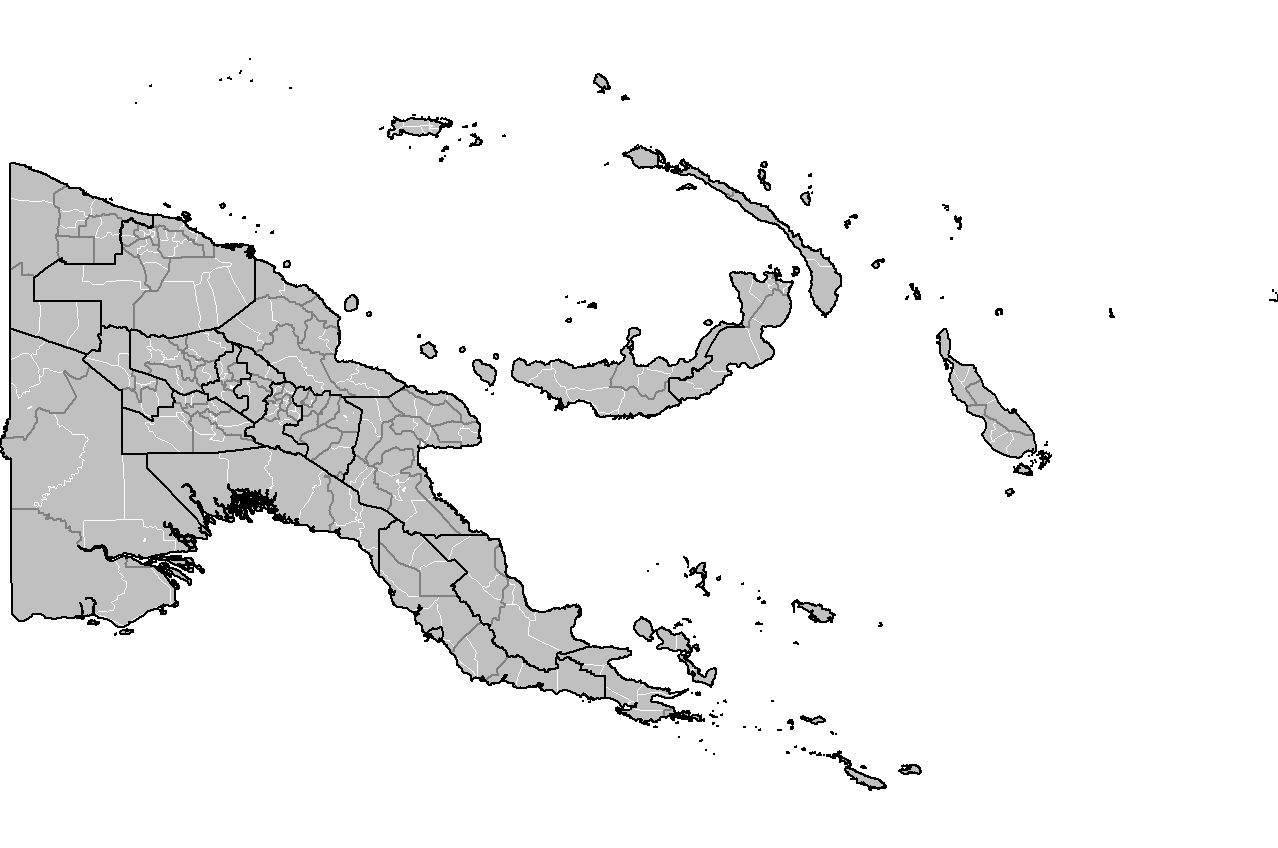
Districts and LLGs of Papua New Guinea

== List of districts by region and province ==
=== Highlands Region ===
==== Chimbu Province ====
- Chuave District
- Gumine District
- Karimui-Nomane District
- Kerowagi District
- Kundiawa-Gembogl District
- Sina Sina-Yonggomugl District (Sinasina-Yonggomugl District)

==== Eastern Highlands Province ====
District map of Eastern Highlands Province

- Daulo District
- Goroka District
- Henganofi District
- Kainantu District
- Lufa District
- Obura-Wonenara District
- Okapa District
- Unggai-Benna District

==== Enga Province ====
- Kandep District
- Kompiam Ambum District
- Lagaip District
- Wapenamanda District
- Wabag District
- Porgera-Paiela District

==== Southern Highlands Province ====
- Ialibu-Pangia District
- Imbonggu District
- Kagua-Erave District
- Mendi-Munihu District
- Nipa-Kutubu District

==== Western Highlands Province ====
- Dei District
- Mount Hagen District
- Mul-Baiyer District
- Tambul-Nebilyer District

==== Hela Province ====
- Magarima District
- Koroba-Kopiago District
- Tari-Pori District
- Komo-Hulia

==== Jiwaka Province ====
- Anglimp-South Waghi District
- Jimi District
- North Waghi District

=== Islands Region ===
==== East New Britain Province ====
- Gazelle District
- Kokopo District
- Pomio District
- Rabaul District

==== Manus Province ====
- Manus District

==== New Ireland Province ====
District map of New Ireland Province

- Kavieng District
- Namatanai District

==== West New Britain Province ====
- Kandrian-Gloucester District
- Talasea District
- Nakanai District

==== Autonomous Region of Bougainville (Bougainville Region) ====
District map of North Solomons Province

- Central Bougainville District
- North Bougainville District
- South Bougainville District

=== Momase Region ===
==== East Sepik Province ====
- Ambunti-Dreikikier District
- Angoram District
- Maprik District
- Wewak District
- Wosera-Gawi District
- Yangoru-Saussia District

==== Madang Province ====
- Bogia District
- Madang District
- Middle Ramu District
- Rai Coast District
- Sumkar District
- Usino Bundi District

==== Morobe Province ====
- Finschhafen District
- Huon District
- Kabwum District
- Lae District
- Markham District
- Menyamya District
- Nawae District
- Tawae-Siassi District
- Bulolo_District
- Wau-Waria District

==== Sandaun (West Sepik) Province ====
- Aitape-Lumi District
- Nuku District
- Telefomin District
- Vanimo-Green River District

=== Southern Region ===
==== Central Province ====
- Abau District
- Goilala District
- Kairuku District
- Hiri-Koiari District
- Rigo District

==== Gulf Province ====
- Kerema District
- Kikori District

==== Milne Bay Province ====
- Alotau District
- Esa'ala District
- Kiriwini-Goodenough District
- Samarai-Murua District

==== Oro (Northern) Province ====
District map of Oro Province

- Ijivitari District
- Sohe District
- Popondetta District

==== Western (Fly) Province ====
District map of Western Province

- North Fly District
- Middle Fly District
- South Fly District
- Delta Fly

==== National Capital District ====
- Port Moresby South
- Port Moresby North-East
- Port Moresby North-West

== See also ==
- Local-level governments of Papua New Guinea
- Provinces of Papua New Guinea
- Regions of Papua New Guinea
- List of cities and towns in Papua New Guinea
- List of cities and towns in Papua New Guinea by population
