= Ambenob Rural LLG =

Local-level government in Papua New Guinea

- Country: Papua New Guinea
- Province: Madang Province
- District: Madang District

Area
  - Total: 833.3 km^{2} (321.7 sq mi)

Population (2021 Estimate)
  - Total: 107,457
  - Density: 129.0/km^{2} (334.0/sq mi)
- Time zone: UTC+10 (AEST)

Ambenob Rural LLG is a local-level government (LLG) of Madang Province, Papua New Guinea.

== Wards ==
- 02. Furan /yahil Sisiak
- 03. Korong / Opi
- 04. Kamba / Kuris
- 05. Siar / Wadan
- 06. Riwo / Nagada
- 07. Amron / Baitabag
- 08. Budad Haven
- 09. Gegeri Wangar
- 10. Ward 10
- 11. Bagupi / Saruga
- 12. Abar / Labting
- 13. Baiteta / Hipondik
- 14. Balima / Kusubar
- 15. Aiyap / Malac
- 16. Sein
- 17. Bahor Sahgala
- 18. Ward 18
- 19. Amele / Omuru
- 20. Bau / Umun
- 21. Bemahal / Fulumu
- 22. Arar/ Maneb
- 23. Asikan/ Utu
