= Mary Kini =

Human rights and peace activist from Papua New Guinea

- Born: Kup Rural LLG, Chimbu Province, Papua New Guinea (PNG)
- Occupations: Human rights and peace worker
- Known for: Opposition to tribal wars

Mary Kini MBE is a human rights and peace activist in Papua New Guinea (PNG). She is a co-founder and the coordinator of Kup Women for Peace, an organization of women dedicated to addressing the problem of tribal fights in the Kup area of PNG.

== Early life ==
Kini was born in the Kup Rural Local Level Government area in the Kerowagi District of Simbu Province in PNG. Kup has 18,000 people and 12 tribal clans. She was adopted by one of her father's brothers and his wife, who were childless. During a tribal fight in the area, her adopted father was killed. Her adopted mother was subsequently accused of being responsible for his death and left the area to avoid being killed by her own tribe. The buildings, land and coffee plantings of the family were then seized. Subsequently, her natural father also died in a tribal fight. One of the few girls in the area to go to school, Kini later tried to study agriculture, but the complete breakdown in law and order in the area meant that she was unable to complete her studies. In 1999, she and her children had to make a rapid escape after another tribal fight broke out, this time with guns being used, when previously the weapons had been limited to bows and arrows.

== Activism ==
Tribal fighting led to a decline in the effectiveness of the police and courts. The culture of "payback" led to many male deaths, while women were displaced, raped and left without sources of food and medical services. Kini approached women from other tribes to see what the women of the area could do to stop tribal fighting. This had to be done surreptitiously, for example hiding behind racks of second-hand clothes at markets, as they were at risk if seen to be talking to people from warring tribes.

Kup Women for Peace (KWP) was established in 1999 by Kini, together with Angela Apa and Agnes Sil, women from three different tribes. They had assistance from community organizer, Sarah Garap. Mobilizing other women to support them, actions undertaken by the women included an initial march for peace. Later activities became more direct, such as walking into a battlefield to stop the fighting, or camping on the battle area. Their actions have been underlined by a strong focus on women's rights in a society where women are not encouraged to speak out. The group recognised that sustainable peace cannot be achieved without the involvement of women and carried out education and awareness-raising about peace and security for all tribes.

The KWP works in partnership with the UN Human Rights Office (OHCHR) in PNG's capital, Port Moresby, with Oxfam PNG and with other women's organizations from the region. It is part of the Papua New Guinea Highlands Women's Human Rights Defenders Network which was initiated by OHCHR. Donors funded programs and, with the relative peace that the women had established, it was possible for teachers, police and nurses to return.

During the 2007 Papua New Guinean general election, KWP took a leading role in attempts to improve the electoral process, taking practical steps to ensure a fair process. Steps taken included guarding the ballot papers the night before the election, to reduce the chance of the papers being stolen. Separate queues were established for women and men, so men could not push or intimidate women to leave the line. In 2011, Kini and KWP were part of an, ultimately unsuccessful, campaign to establish reserved seats for women in PNG's parliament.

== Awards ==
- In 2007, Mary Kini and the KWP received the 7th Pacific Human Rights Award. It was given for KWP's outstanding work in situations of conflict, for its dedication to the cause of peace in the PNG highlands and for its bravery in challenging discriminatory customs, including widespread violence against women.
- In 2020, Mary Kini was awarded an MBE in the Queen's 2020 Birthday Honours list for Papua New Guinea, for "services to the community and advancement of women".
