= Sarah Garap =

Human rights activist from Papua New Guinea

- Born: Mount Hagen, Papua New Guinea (PNG)
- Other names: Sarah Maima Garap
- Occupations: Human rights and peace worker
- Known for: Promoting the rights of women and children in the Highlands of PNG

Sarah Garap is a prominent community development worker and human rights activist in the Highlands of Papua New Guinea (PNG).

== Early life and training ==
Sarah Maima Garap comes from Mount Hagen, one of a family of eight children, five boys and three girls. As is quite common in the Highlands of PNG, she was later adopted by her uncle, who was married to her mother's sister, as they did not have female children. She has written that this gave her the best of both worlds. Her biological parents ensured that she got an education and had exposure to urban areas, while her adopted parents gave her a cultural and traditional upbringing in a village life. At a young age she was already standing up for the rights of others, protecting her sisters against bullies at school.

In 1995, Garap went to Beijing as part of the Beneath Paradise Pacific Women's Documentation Project. The project funded 23 women's organizations from eight Pacific countries to gather documentation about women's lives, using photographs, articles, testimonials and poetry. The project broadened her awareness and understanding of social justice, which she applied on returning to PNG. In 2000 she was sponsored to attend a community-based development studies course at the Coady International Institute on the campus of St. Francis Xavier University in Antigonish, Nova Scotia in Canada. This gave her the chance to understand participatory community development approaches. In 2006 and 2007 she did a master's degree in Participation, Power and Social Change at the Institute of Development Studies of the University of Sussex in Brighton, England. In her thesis she argued for participatory governance from a gendered perspective and a bottom-up grassroots development model as a way to achieve progress in policy debates in Papua New Guinea.

== Activism ==
Since 2000, Garap has worked in a number of non-government organizations and community programmes. Her work has been aimed primarily at promoting the rights of women and children in the Highlands region of PNG. She supported three women from the Kup area of Simbu Province, Mary Kini, Angela Apa and Agnes Sil, to establish Kup Women for Peace (KWP), which aimed to address the endemic tribal fighting in the area. In 2002, she established Meri I Kirap Sapotim (Support Women's Advancement - MIKS) in the aftermath of standing as a candidate in the 2002 Papua New Guinean general election, and was its director and mentor from 2003 to 2012. Her experience as a candidate made her aware of the corruption, malpractices, intimidation of voters, and bribery of officials that took place.

In 2008, Garap worked with the Women, Communities, and Police Peace Group in PNG, which built on a previous group established in 1997 called the PNG CEDAW (the UN Convention on the Elimination of All Forms of Discrimination Against Women) Action Committee. In 2010, she addressed the Committee on the Elimination of Discrimination Against Women at the United Nations in New York. She has worked with UNICEF and PNG's Department of Justice and Attorney General to develop a human rights training module for local village courts in PNG. In 2013 she became the first Rotary International Peace Fellow from PNG and took a course in peace studies at Chulalongkorn University in Bangkok, Thailand.

Since 2010 Garap has been employed by Exxon Mobil as a community development worker in the Highland areas that produce Liquified Natural Gas. At the 2017 Papua New Guinean general election she worked with communities in Jiwaka Province to carry out a voter awareness campaign on candidate selection. Since 2017 she has attended what is known as Community Leader Courts, an informal court in a village setting, where conflicts (such as sorcery-related violence and violence against women) are discussed and resolved, or referred to the village courts. She provides comments on questions of human rights and the opportunities for redress.
