= Naho Rawa Rural LLG =

Local-level government in Papua New Guinea

- Location within Papua New Guinea
- Coordinates: 5.829757°S 145.934781°E
- Country: Papua New Guinea
- Province: Madang Province
- District: Rai Coast District

Area
  - Total: 1,170 km^{2} (450 sq mi)

Population (2021 Estimate)
  - Total: 17,082
  - Density: 14.6/km^{2} (37.8/sq mi)
- Time zone: UTC+10 (AEST)

Naho Rawa Rural LLG is a local-level government (LLG) of Madang Province, Papua New Guinea.

== Wards ==
- 01. Gurumbo
- 02. Mungoui
- 03. Ranara
- 04. Boro
- 05. Tauta
- 06. Barim
- 07. Goiro
- 08. Niningo
- 09. Numbaiya
- 10. Gomumu
- 11. Saranga
- 12. Serengo
- 13. Kikipe
- 14. Wamunde
- 15. Wari
- 16. Butemu
- 17. Durukopo
- 18. Senei
- 19. Gumbarami
- 20. Sewe
