= Rai Coast Rural LLG =

Local-level government in Papua New Guinea

Saidor (Rai Kos) Rural LLG
- Location within Papua New Guinea
- Coordinates: 5.6258°S 146.457895°E
- Country: Papua New Guinea
- Province: Madang Province
- District: Rai Coast District

Area
  - Total: 2,178 km^{2} (841 sq mi)

Population (2021 Estimate)
  - Total: 43,285
  - Density: 19.87/km^{2} (51.47/sq mi)
- Time zone: UTC+10 (AEST)

Rai Coast Rural LLG is a local-level government (LLG) of Madang Province, Papua New Guinea.

== Wards ==
- 01. Gauss (Bonga), Malalamai, Gali and Bonga. Bonga and Malalamai speak the one language - the Bonga Malalamai language while Gali speak Gali language.

(Yagomi language speakers)

- 04. Kepolak
- 05. Baru
- 06. Mamgak (Forak language and Ronji language speakers)
- 07. Mur
- 08. Umboldi
- 09. Kakimar
- 10. Saidor
- 11. Yaimas
- 12. Waibol
- 13. Biliau
- 14. Sibog
- 15. Suri
- 16. Bagalawa
- 17. Lamtup
- 18. Maibang
- 19. Yorkia
- 20. Sari
- 21. Sorang
- 22. Kiambaui
- 23. Matako
- 24. Gogou
- 25. Sarakiri
- 26. Kwongo
- 27. Wado
- 28. Simimididi
- 29. Wongetuo
- 30. Ganglau
- 31. Orinma
- 32. Mebu
- 33. Batoto
- 34. Matafun
- 35. Bok
- 36. Malala
- 37. Ward 37
- 38. Ward 38
- 39. Ward 39
- 40. Ward 40
- 41. Ward 41
- 42. Ward 42 (Mebu language speakers)
