= Kerowagi District =

- Location within Papua New Guinea
- Coordinates: 6°13′S 144°45′E
- Country: Papua New Guinea
- Province: Chimbu Province
- Capital: Kerowagi
- LLGs: List: Gena-Waugla Rural LLG; Kerowagi Rural LLG; Kup Rural LLG

Area
  - Total: 547 km^{2} (211 sq mi)

Population (2011 census)
  - Total: 93,107
  - Density: 170/km^{2} (441/sq mi)
- Time zone: UTC+10 (AEST)

Kerowagi District is a district of Simbu Province in Papua New Guinea. Its capital is Kerowagi and the district has local level government (LLG) areas including Gena-Waugla Rural, Kerowagi Rural, Koronigl, and Kup Rural.

Kerowagi is located geographically towards the western part of the province and shares common administrative, political, economic and geographic features with Western Highlands Province. It is in the famous Waghi Valley, with Digine-Kubor Range to the south and Drekore Range to the north. It is regarded as one of the fertile valleys where cash crops are grown in abundance. The native people speak the Kuman language, which is their original dialect. The original tribes of the Kerowagi district are Siambugla-Waugla, Kombuku, Gena, Bandi, Kumai, Endugla No. 2, Bindeku, Graiku, Siglku, Kamaneku, Paglau and Dagle.

== Economy and infrastructure ==
There are two secondary schools, Kondiu Rosary and Kerowagi, with many "top up" primary schools acting as feeder schools. Most locals are either self-employed or engaged in small scale economic activity. The district has some of the province's best road networks. One of the roads was sealed in 2004.

Of all the districts in Simbu Province, Kerowagi is said to be developing at a much faster rate then the others. This is basically due to the fertility of the valley and its access to infrastructure, improved and established road networks, and mindset of the people and community. Most of the locals are coffee growers and work their own smallholder blocks. The coffee season starts from as early as March to end of June and this period is normally referred to as six-mun. The local people are benefiting from recent increases in the world price of coffee.

Apart from coffee, they are also engaged in producing spices and other market produce for local consumers. The biggest health clinic in the district is St. Joseph Mingende Rural Hospital. Its status was changed from health centre to rural hospital in 2000, with a full-time medical doctor.

In February 2025, Angagoi market, a modern facility, was officially opened in Upper Koronigl to serve local residents and farmers.
