= Kovon Rural LLG =

Local-level government in Papua New Guinea

- Country: Papua New Guinea
- Province: Madang Province
- District: Middle Ramu District

Area
  - Total: 1,686 km^{2} (651 sq mi)

Population (2021 Estimate)
  - Total: 21,943
  - Density: 13.01/km^{2} (33.71/sq mi)
- Time zone: UTC+10 (AEST)

Kovon Rural LLG is a local-level government (LLG) of Madang Province, Papua New Guinea.

== Wards ==
- 01. Salemp
- 02. Sonvak
- 03. Aranam
- 22. Hangaple
- 23. Aradip
- 24. Sangapi
- 25. Dangu
- 26. Gebrau
- 27. Tingi
- 28. Yilu
- 29. Mamusi
- 30. Fitako
- 31. Gubaine
- 32. Wulim
- 33. Yahl
