= Chuave =

Chuave may refer to:

- Chuave, Papua New Guinea, capital of Chuave District
- Chuave District, Papua New Guinea
- Chuave Rural LLG, Papua New Guinea
- Chuave language
