= Nomane Rural LLG =

Local-level government in Papua New Guinea

- Location within Papua New Guinea
- Coordinates: 6.318067°S 145.069257°E
- Country: Papua New Guinea
- Province: Chimbu Province
- Time zone: UTC+10 (AEST)

Nomane Rural LLG is a local-level government (LLG) of Chimbu Province, Papua New Guinea. The Nomane language is spoken in the LLG.

== Wards ==
1. Dekamane
2. Awna
3. Gaimo
4. Kolu
5. Oru
6. Monowari
7. Kora
8. Dama
9. Hopum
10. Yuwai
11. Kalem
12. Kukama
13. Apuri
