= Wasu =

Wasu may refer to:

Places

- Wasu, Punjab, town of Mandi Bahauddin District, Pakistan
- Wasu, Papua New Guinea, a district capital in Morobe Province
- Wasu Rural LLG, a local-level government in Morobe Province, Papua New Guinea

Other

- Wasu language, an extinct language of Brazil
- West African Students' Union
- WASU-FM, a radio station owned by Appalachian State University, North Carolina
- WASU-LP, a low-power radio station owned by Albany State University, Georgia
- Wassu, a Gambian town where the Senegambian stone circles can be found
