= Dei Rural LLG =

Local-level government in Papua New Guinea

- Location within Papua New Guinea
- Coordinates: 5.755364°S 144.273404°E
- Country: Papua New Guinea
- Province: Western Highlands Province
- Time zone: UTC+10 (AEST)

Dei Rural LLG is a local-level government (LLG) of Western Highlands Province, Papua New Guinea.

== Wards ==
- 01. Muglamp.1
- 02. Muglamp.2
- 03. Mun
- 04. Gumanch.1
- 05. Gumanch.2
- 06. Kuk 1
- 07. Mopi
- 08. Keta
- 09. Keraldong
- 10. Kumbunga
- 11. Moga
- 12. Pung
- 13. Rauna
- 14. Kamund
- 15. Kenembomuka
- 18. Kenabuga.1
- 19. Bitam
- 29. Kindal
- 30. Palgi
- 31. Komapana
- 36. Kelem.1
- 39. Tigi.2
- 40. Kenabuga.2
- 42. Klenembo
- 47. Tigi.1
