= Regions of Papua New Guinea =

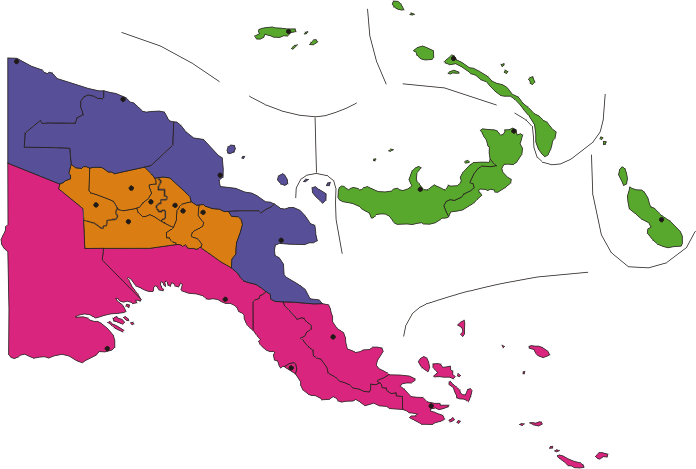
Highlands Region Islands Region Momase Region Southern Region

Papua New Guinea is divided into four regions, which are its broadest administrative divisions of Papua New Guinea. While the 22 provincial-level divisions are the primary administrative divisions of PNG, the regions are quite significant in daily life, as they are often the basis for organisation of government services (such as police), corporate operations, sporting competitions, and even the machinations of politics.

== Overview ==
For instance, there has been much discussion over the years of how many prime ministers have come from each region, and whether a particular region is due to provide the next one. Ministers and departmental heads are often appointed with an eye to maintaining an overall balance between the regions.

== Regions ==
People generally identify quite strongly with their region, and inter-region rivalries can be intense.

There are four regions, each of which comprises a number of provinces:

- Highlands Region: Chimbu (Simbu), Eastern Highlands, Enga, Hela, Jiwaka, Southern Highlands, and Western Highlands.
- Islands Region: Bougainville (North Solomons), East New Britain, Manus, New Ireland, and West New Britain.
- Momase Region: East Sepik, Madang, Morobe, and Sandaun (West Sepik).
- Southern Region: Central, Gulf, Milne Bay, Oro (Northern), Western (Fly River), and National Capital District (Port Moresby).

Momase is a recently devised portmanteau word which combines the first two letters of Morobe, Madang, and Sepik (East Sepik and West Sepik).

Region	Largest city	Population (2021 census)	Area (km^{2})	Density (pop/km^{2})
Highlands Region	Mount Hagen	4,566,398	62,400	73
Islands Region	Arawa	1,761,841	56,602	31
Momase Region	Lae	3,040,584	142,600	21
Southern Region	Port Moresby	2,412,736	202,542	12

== See also ==
- Provinces of Papua New Guinea
- Districts of Papua New Guinea
- Local-level governments of Papua New Guinea
- List of cities and towns in Papua New Guinea
- List of cities and towns in Papua New Guinea by population
