= Salt Rural LLG =

Local-level government in Papua New Guinea

- Location within Papua New Guinea
- Coordinates: 6.275773°S 145.012463°E
- Country: Papua New Guinea
- Province: Chimbu Province
- Time zone: UTC+10 (AEST)

Salt Rural LLG is a local-level government (LLG) of Chimbu Province, Papua New Guinea. The Salt language is spoken in the LLG.

== Wards ==
1. Banievera
2. Sua Begen
3. Dirima 2
4. Dayani
5. Goroba
6. Ainabane
7. Perwi
8. Yopakeni
9. Yopaeri
10. Mogiagi
11. Morinil/Kori
12. Yopakul
13. Waido
14. Tapiekul
15. Kobiebalmil
16. Tapai
17. Yuribol
18. Mirima
19. Bori
20. Mulugra
21. Mankon
22. Kama
23. Gaima
