= Lumusa Rural LLG =

Local-level government in Papua New Guinea

- Location within Papua New Guinea
- Coordinates: 5.550°S 144.042°E
- Country: Papua New Guinea
- Province: Western Highlands Province
- Time zone: UTC+10 (AEST)

Lumusa Rural LLG is a local-level government (LLG) of Western Highlands Province, Papua New Guinea.

Lumusa (Lumis) used to be part of Enga Province.

== Wards ==
- 01. Lai.1
- 02. Rombau
- 03. Mondaiyanda
- 04. Laiyakama.2
- 05. Nekerapa.1
- 06. Negarada 2
- 07. Negerapa.3
- 08. Pinyapaisa.1
- 09. Pinapaisa.2
- 10. Mano
- 11. Minigiwa
- 12. Wangumali
- 13. Kumbakosa.1
- 14. Kumbakosa.2
- 15. Yangomanda
- 16. Sinjumanda
- 17. Jikama
- 18. Kunjilama
- 19. Kakemali.1
- 20. Kakemali.2
- 21. Kakemali.3
- 22. Keimanda
- 23. Kugu/Kumasina
- 24. Ipiylisina Kumasina 2
- 25. Indiypendent/Kumasina 3
