= BRZ =

BRZ may refer to:

- Business Revitalization Zone, an area within which businesses pay an additional tax to fund improvements within the district's boundaries
- Subaru BRZ, a sports car
- Austrian Federal Computing Centre, referred to as Bundesrechenzentrum in German

brz is the ISO 639-3 code of the Bilibil language
