= Tabare Rural LLG =

Local-level government in Papua New Guinea

Tabare Rural LLG Sinasina Rural LLG
- Country: Papua New Guinea
- Province: Chimbu Province
- Time zone: UTC+10 (AEST)

Tabare Rural LLG (formerly known as Sinasina Rural LLG) is a local-level government (LLG) of Chimbu Province, Papua New Guinea. The Sinasina language is spoken in the LLG.

== Wards ==
1. Bulagesible
2. Gilmai/Arebi
3. Maima
4. Temisnowai
5. Galaku
6. Klai
7. Masul 1
8. Masul 2
9. Yalemesi
10. Yalkomno
11. Kapma (Garen)
12. Kapma (Mak)
13. Woma
14. Kautabandi
