= Chuave Rural LLG =

Local-level government in Papua New Guinea

- Location within Papua New Guinea
- Coordinates: 6.121416°S 145.124367°E
- Country: Papua New Guinea
- Province: Chimbu Province
- Time zone: UTC+10 (AEST)

Chuave Rural LLG is a local-level government (LLG) of Chimbu Province, Papua New Guinea. The Chuave language is spoken in the LLG.

== Wards ==
1. Sirikoge
2. Emegi
3. Membimangi
4. Togoma
5. Agugu
6. Kautambandi
7. Maimagu
8. Goi
9. Mainamo
10. Keu No. 1
11. Keu No. 2
12. Onoma
13. Eigun
14. Chuave Urban
