= Simbai Rural LLG =

Local-level government in Papua New Guinea

- Country: Papua New Guinea
- Province: Madang Province
- District: Middle Ramu District

Area
  - Total: 584.5 km^{2} (225.7 sq mi)

Population (2021 Estimate)
  - Total: 32,448
  - Density: 55.51/km^{2} (143.8/sq mi)
- Time zone: UTC+10 (AEST)

Simbai Rural LLG is a local-level government (LLG) of Madang Province, Papua New Guinea. The Kalam language is spoken in the LLG.

== Wards ==
- 04. Ainong
- 05. Momuk
- 06. Kaironk
- 07. Fongoi
- 08. Fundum
- 09. Gubun
- 10. Nugunt
- 11. Koki
- 12. Yambunglem
- 13. Kerevin
- 14. Kurumdek
- 15. Kandum
- 16. Tinam
- 17. Aigram
- 18. Kampaying
- 19. Babaimp
- 20. Kumbruf
- 21. Tsungup
