= Elimbari Rural LLG =

Local-level government in Papua New Guinea

- Location within Papua New Guinea
- Coordinates: 6.262816°S 145.136688°E
- Country: Papua New Guinea
- Province: Chimbu Province
- Time zone: UTC+10 (AEST)

Elimbari Rural LLG is a local-level government (LLG) of Chimbu Province, Papua New Guinea. The Chuave language is spoken in the LLG.

== Wards ==
1. Monono
2. Gogo No.1
3. Gogo No.2
4. Kuraigure
5. Kurere 1
6. Kurere 2
7. Giriu No.1
8. Giriu No.2
9. Wangoi
10. Kororume No.1
11. Kururume
12. Yorori
13. Pimuri No.2
14. Pimuri (Oroma)
15. Karaweri No.1
16. Karaweri No.2

== Provincial Government Members ==
The Provincial Government Members (PGM) of Elimbari Rural LLG are:

- Chief Teine Agyonga: 1964-1983
- Dama Sipa: 1983-1988
- Bob Gioga: 1988-1994
- Teimai Timothy Komane: 1994-1999
