= Statutory corporation =

Corporation with legal personhood directly created by the state

A statutory corporation is a corporation created by statute. Their precise nature varies by jurisdiction, but their powers are defined in, and controlled by, the creating legislation.

Bodies described in the English language as "statutory corporations" exist in the following countries in accordance with the associated descriptions (where provided).

== Australia ==
In Australia, statutory corporations are a type of statutory authority created by Acts of state or federal parliaments.

A statutory corporation is defined in the federal Department of Finance's glossary as a "statutory body that is a body corporate, including an entity created under section 87 of the PGPA Act" (i.e. a statutory authority may also be a statutory corporation). An earlier definition describes a statutory corporation as "a statutory authority that is a body corporate", and the New South Wales Government's Land Registry Services defines a state-owned corporation as "a statutory authority that has corporate status".

Current statutory corporations include Australia Post, Airservices Australia, the Australian Rail Track Corporation and the Australian Egg Corporation. The purpose of their separation from normal government operations is to ensure profitability, and in theory, independence of decision making from the state or national government (to ensure that decisions are made on a commercial basis with less or no political interference.) As statutory corporations, their regulatory and business conditions may be significantly different from private-sector companies.

A significant number of the statutory corporations are private commercial operations, a number of which have been privatised, in part or in whole, since the 1980s: these have included the national airline Qantas, Telstra (also previously known as Telecom Australia) and the Commonwealth Bank.

== Austria ==
A well known example of a statutory corporation in Austria is the Austrian Federal Computing Centre, which provides IT services to most government agencies in Austria. The centre is a GmbH that was created by statute. It carries out functions that were previously fulfilled by the Ministry of Finance.

Similarly, the ORF-Beitrags Service, which collects the Austrian TV licence fee, is also a limited company created by statute.

Even local law enforcement in Austria is at times handled by organisations akin to statutory corporations: In the city of Linz, the municipal government owns the Ordnungsdienst der Stadt Linz GmbH, a limited company that fulfills functions that could be compared to bylaw enforcement in the United States.

== Germany ==
A statutory corporation in Germany is called a Körperschaft des öffentlichen Rechts (KdöR). An example of a statutory corporation is a Kassenärztliche Vereinigung, a body involved in the provision of out-patient medical services in a German state. Other examples include public broadcasters, Jewish communities and Christian churches established in Germany. Sparkassen, which are publicly owned local banks, can also be considered statutory corporations depending on the jurisdiction.

== Hong Kong ==
In Hong Kong, some corporations are incorporated by legislation. An example is the Kowloon-Canton Railway Corporation, which owns the railway network and was previously also an operator. The MTR Corporation Limited was also such a company, then named as Mass Transit Railway Corporation. Other examples include the Ocean Park Corporation, and the former Industrial Estates Corporation and Land Development Corporation.

== India ==
Statutory corporations are government establishments brought into existence by a Special Act of the Parliament. The Act defines its powers and functions, rules and regulations governing its employees and its relationship with government departments.

This is a body corporate created by the legislature with defined powers and functions and is financially independent with a clear control over a specified area or a particular type of commercial activity. It is a corporate person and has the capacity of acting in its own name. Statutory corporations therefore have the power of the government and the considerable amount of operating flexibility of private enterprises. A few are:

- Airports Authority of India
- Damodar Valley Corporation
- National Highways Authority of India
- Central Warehousing Corporation (cewacor.nic.in/)
- Inland Waterways Authority of India (www.iwai.gov.in/)
- Food Corporation of India (fciweb.nic.in/)

Features:

1. Generally financed by the central or state government.
2. May borrow funds from the public and government organisation through statutory sources.
3. They have separate legal entity.
4. They have to frame their own policies and procedures within the scope of state legislature.
5. Provide better services to public and make adequate profit.
6. They are autonomous in their functioning, thus, they enjoy operational flexibility.
7. They can recruit and appoint their employees with their service condition, since they are a corporate body.
8. They have to follow the special statute strictly.
9. There is less government interference in matters of the corporation.
10. The members of the corporation have limited liability.
11. a public corporation is public body incorporated under a separate statue

Which define its objectives, power and duties. It is created by a special law Of parliament. It may be established by the central government are also known as National corporations.

== Ireland ==
In Ireland, a statutory corporation is a body corporate, which is created under a particular Act of the Oireachtas. Some statutory corporations are expected to operate as if they were a commercial company (with or without a subsidy from the Exchequer, depending on whether or not it would make a profit without one). Such bodies do not have shareholders, but are typically boards appointed by a sponsor minister. The provisions of the Companies' Acts do not typically directly apply to such bodies, although their founding legislation may specify similar requirements.

The statutory corporation format was usually the form most state-sponsored bodies of Ireland took until recent years; however, the usual policy today is that a private limited company by shares or public limited company incorporated under the Companies' Acts is set up instead, with the relevant minister holding 100% of the issued share capital. Nonetheless, as of 2007, several prominent statutory corporations continue to exist, such as Raidió Teilifís Éireann (RTÉ), the Electricity Supply Board (ESB), Bord Gáis Éireann, An Bord Pleanála, the Food Safety Authority of Ireland.

== United Kingdom ==
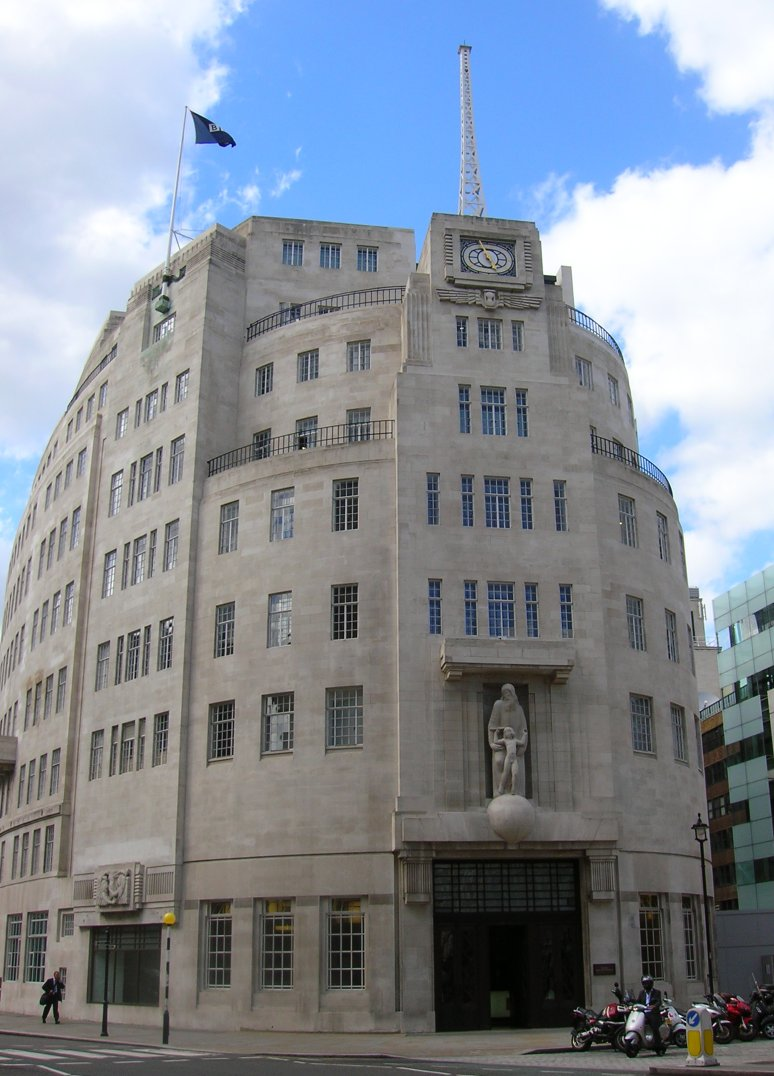
BBC broadcasting house

In the United Kingdom, a statutory corporation is a corporate body controlled by, and normally created by, statute. It typically has no shareholders and its powers are defined by the act of Parliament which creates it, and may be modified by later legislation. Such bodies have often been created to provide public services, examples including British Railways, the Ffestiniog Railway, the Talyllyn Railway, the National Coal Board, the former Post Office Corporation and Transport for London. Other examples include the local authorities, Channel Four Television Corporation, and the Olympic Delivery Authority. Statutory corporations are widely used in education: sixth form college corporations and further education corporations, the legal form of sixth form colleges and further education colleges, as well as higher education corporations, the legal form of most post-1992 universities, are all statutory corporations created under the Education Reform Act 1988 and the Further and Higher Education Act 1992; a small number of older universities are also statutory corporations created under specific acts of Parliament. The phrase is not used to describe a company which operates as a conventional shareholder-owned company registered under the Companies Acts.

See also

- A non-departmental public body is a classification to certain types of public bodies.
  - Quango (quasi-autonomous-non-governmental organisation) is a commonly used acronym to refer to a non-departmental public body.
- The Scottish public bodies are all quangos and other organisations in Scotland.

A public body can have a variety of forms and is not inevitably a statutory corporation, nor is a statutory corporation necessarily a public body.

== United States ==
At the state level, municipal corporations and counties are often created by legislative acts. Some organizations such as a transit district or special purpose corporations such as a university, are also created by statute. In some states, a city or county can be created by petition of a certain number or percentage of voters or landholders of the affected area, which then causes a municipal corporation to be chartered as a result of compliance with the appropriate law. Corporations to be established for most other purposes are usually just incorporated as any other non-profit corporation, by filing the paperwork with the appropriate agency as part of the formation of the entity.

At the Federal level, a small number of corporations are created by Congress. Prior to the District of Columbia being granted the ability to issue corporate charters in the late 19th century, corporations operating in the District required a congressional charter. With limited exceptions, most corporations created by Congress are not federally chartered, but are simply created as District of Columbia corporations as a result of the enabling law.

There are a number of federally chartered corporations that still exist. Some relatively famous ones include the Boy Scouts of America, each of the Federal Reserve Banks, and the Federal Deposit Insurance Corporation. The basic advantage for being federally chartered is that no other corporation anywhere in the United States is allowed to have the same name.

== See also ==
- Government agency
- Statutory authority
- Crown corporation
- Government-owned corporation
- Regulatory agency
- Non-departmental public body
- Établissement public à caractère industriel et commercial
- Tokushu hōjin (specially designated public corporation in Japan)
- Crown entity, similar bodies in New Zealand
