= HELP.gv.at =

HELP.gv.at was a multi-agency platform managed by the Austrian Federal Administration and developed by the Austrian Federal Computing Centre. The platform hosts material provided by the Information and Services of the Austrian Public Administration. The website is a platform that allows Austrian citizens to coordinate and submit documentation across a number of government agencies, including access to different government procedures and documentation.

HELP.gv.at was launched in 1997 as an information platform about administrative procedures for citizens and transformed into one of the most important hubs of e-administration in Austria. It was originally available via internet or one of several hundred multi-media stations within the EU. It was designed to create a one-stop-shop for administrative procedures of citizens and Austrian workers. The site was essential for improving accessibility for citizens wishing to access government information, as well as assembling federal and local administrative documents in one place. It went offline in 2019 and has since been replaced by the oesterreich.gv.at.
