= Madang =

Capital of Madang Province, Papua New Guinea

- Town
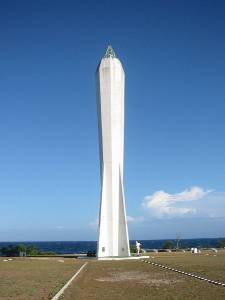
- Coastwatchers Memorial Lighthouse, Kalibobo, Madang

- Location in Papua New Guinea
- Coordinates: 5°13′S 145°48′E
- Country: Papua New Guinea
- Province: Madang Province
- District: Madang District
- Established: 1884
- Elevation: 3 m (9.8 ft)

Population (2013)
  - Total: 29,339
- Time zone: UTC+10 (AEST)
- Climate: Af

Madang (old German name: Friedrich-Wilhelmshafen) is the capital of Madang Province and is a town with a population of 27,420 (in 2005) on the north coast of Papua New Guinea. The city is also one of the major towns in Papua New Guinea.

== History ==
Nicholai Miklukho-Maklai was probably the first European to visit the area. In 1871 he stayed at Astrolabe Bay south of present-day Madang for 15 months. He had a good relationship with the local communities before leaving, suffering from malaria.

In April 1884 an expedition by the German New Guinea Company led by Otto Finsch and Eduard Dallmann arrived and named the landing point "Friedrich Wilhelmshafen"; however, they felt that the area was unsuitable for a settlement. A subsequent survey in 1888 mentioned good soil conditions that would make a coffee plantation possible. In the summer of 1891 a station was built and by September 1892 was the seat of the provincial administration; however, the Imperial Government Commissioner remained at Stephansort, some 23 kilometers away due to concerns about malaria. The name of "Madang" was used by Papuan natives who had accompanied the German administrators after their home island and only became the official name of the settlement towards the end of the German administration. Although the settlement was expanded from 1893–1894 with warehouses, a sawmill, hospital and other facilities, (including an ox-drawn railway to Stephansort) various ventures, such as the coffee plantations and atap palm processing proved economically ruinous, due to malaria and inclement climate. From 1895 and 1896 several German warships were stationed here for a survey of surrounding waters, during which time a total of 295 men came down with malaria. In 1899 the capital of the New Guinea Company was transferred to Herbertshöhe on the island of New Pomerania (now New Britain).

Following World War I, the area was turned over to Australia as part of the League of Nations mandated Territory of New Guinea.

The Imperial Japanese Army captured Madang without a fight during World War II in 1942. In September 1943, Australian forces launched a sustained campaign to retake the Finisterre Range and Madang. The town was captured on April 24, 1944, but during the fighting and occupation it was virtually destroyed and had to be rebuilt afterwards.

== NGO presence in Madang ==
Madang is viewed by many in the country as being safer and more pleasant for expatriates than the larger cities of Lae and Port Moresby. Because of this, some NGOs have chosen Madang as the location of their main offices in country.

CUSO (a Canadian NGO) and VSO (a British NGO) both have their headquarters in Madang.

Save the Children, WWF, and World Vision are also present with branch offices in Madang.

As a consequence Madang has a larger number of expatriates working and living in the town than its small population would suggest.

== Climate ==
Like other parts of Papua New Guinea, Madang has a tropical rainforest climate (Köppen climate classification Af), with significant rainfall throughout the year and the temperature being hot year-round. The average annual high temperature is 30.6 °C (87.1 °F), while the average annual low temperature is 23.8 °C (74.8 °F). Temperatures remain consistent throughout the year, but there is variation between the month. February has the highest average high at 31.2 °C (88.2 °F). Multiple months have the highest average low at 23.9 °C (75.0 °F). July and August has the lowest average high at 30.2 °C (86.4 °F). July has the lowest average low at 23.4 °C (74.1 °F).

Madang receives 3,106.8 millimetres (122.31 in) of rain over 224 precipitation days, with abundant rainfall throughout the year but a wetter and drier season. April, the wettest month, receives 389.4 millimetres (15.33 in) of rainfall over 23 precipitation days on average. September receives the least rainfall of any month, receiving 82.6 millimetres (3.25 in) of rainfall over 11 precipitation days. Madang receives 2184 hours of sunshine annually on average, with the sunshine being distributed fairly evenly across the year, with a noticeable dip in the wetter months. September receives the most sunshine, while March receives the least.

Climate data for Madang
Month	Jan	Feb	Mar	Apr	May	Jun	Jul	Aug	Sep	Oct	Nov	Dec	Year
Record high °C (°F)	33.2 (91.8)	33.3 (91.9)	33.3 (91.9)	33.7 (92.7)	32.2 (90.0)	32.2 (90.0)	31.5 (88.7)	31.7 (89.1)	33.4 (92.1)	31.7 (89.1)	32.5 (90.5)	33.6 (92.5)	33.7 (92.7)
Mean daily maximum °C (°F)	30.8 (87.4)	30.6 (87.1)	30.6 (87.1)	30.6 (87.1)	30.7 (87.3)	30.4 (86.7)	30.2 (86.4)	30.2 (86.4)	30.5 (86.9)	30.9 (87.6)	31.2 (88.2)	30.9 (87.6)	30.6 (87.1)
Mean daily minimum °C (°F)	23.9 (75.0)	23.8 (74.8)	23.9 (75.0)	23.8 (74.8)	23.9 (75.0)	23.7 (74.7)	23.4 (74.1)	23.7 (74.7)	23.6 (74.5)	23.8 (74.8)	23.9 (75.0)	23.9 (75.0)	23.8 (74.8)
Record low °C (°F)	21.0 (69.8)	20.7 (69.3)	20.8 (69.4)	21.1 (70.0)	20.1 (68.2)	19.9 (67.8)	20.0 (68.0)	18.9 (66.0)	20.8 (69.4)	20.3 (68.5)	20.0 (68.0)	19.4 (66.9)	18.9 (66.0)
Average rainfall mm (inches)	343.8 (13.54)	292.0 (11.50)	329.8 (12.98)	389.4 (15.33)	343.4 (13.52)	186.4 (7.34)	144.2 (5.68)	93.8 (3.69)	82.6 (3.25)	239.2 (9.42)	280.2 (11.03)	382.0 (15.04)	3,106.8 (122.31)
Average rainy days	23	21	23	23	21	18	15	12	11	15	19	23	224
Average relative humidity (%)	85	85	85	85	85	84	84	82	83	83	84	84	84
Mean monthly sunshine hours	160	140	144	162	193	195	198	210	227	210	185	160	2,184
Source 1: World Meteorological Organisation
Source 2: Deutscher Wetterdienst (extremes, humidity and sun) (Note: Station ID for Madang W.O is 92014 Use this station ID to locate the sunshine duration)

== Education ==
Madang is the home of Divine Word University. Madang Museum is a small museum that features natural science and ethnographic objects from the local area and East Sepik Province more widely. It shares a building with Madang Visitors and Cultural Bureau.

== Products ==
Industry and farming are growing constantly in importance, especially for export. There are the widespread coconut palm plantations on the coast and cardamum is grown in Madang.

The Kulili plantation is the second largest of Kar Kar Island's twelve plantations with its more than a thousand coconut palms and cocoa trees. 70% of the cocoa and 50% of the copra produced in Madang province comes from Kar Kar.

In Madang province 173 regional languages are spoken, some of them being extremely different from the others.

== Images ==
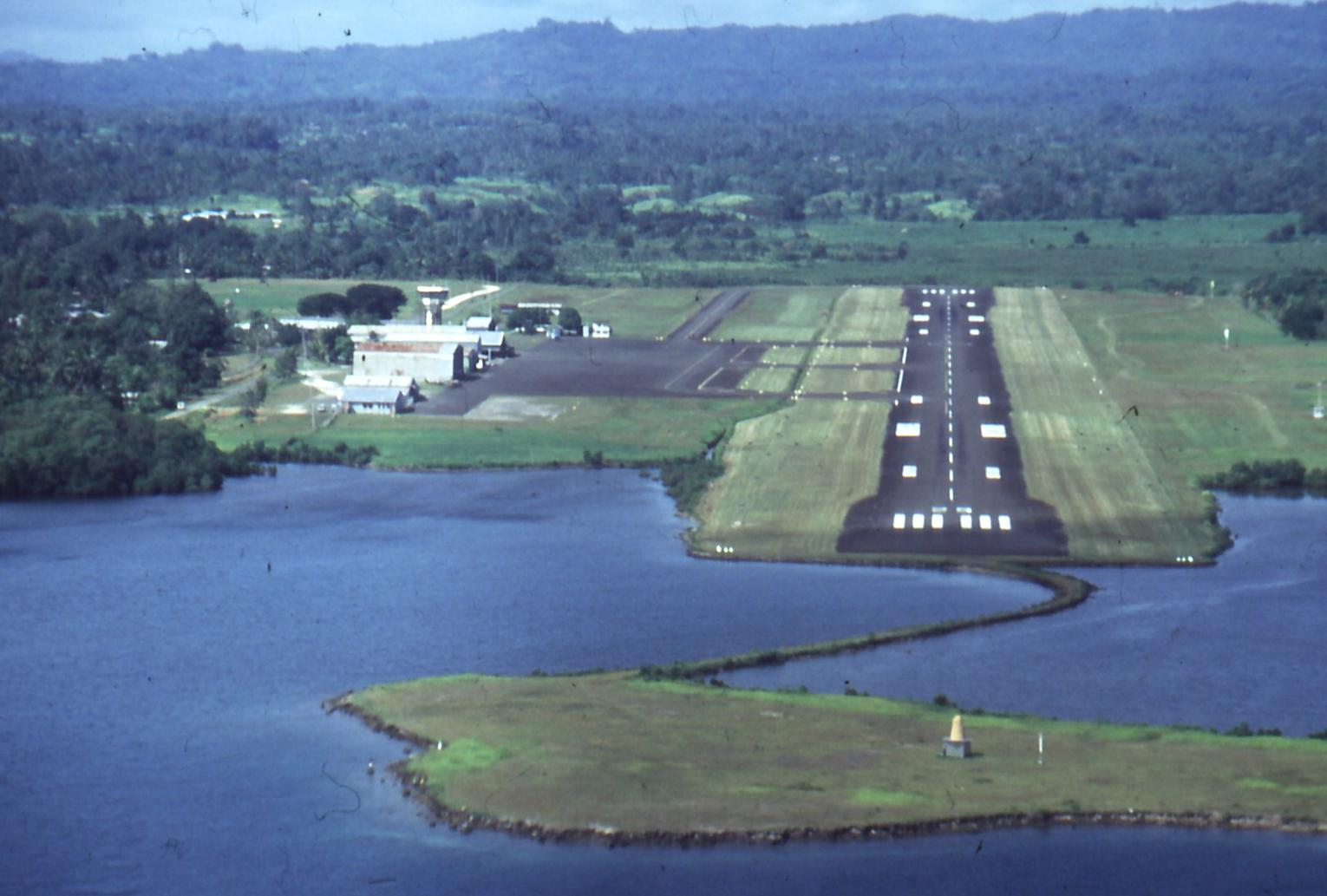
Madang Airport

Madang from space

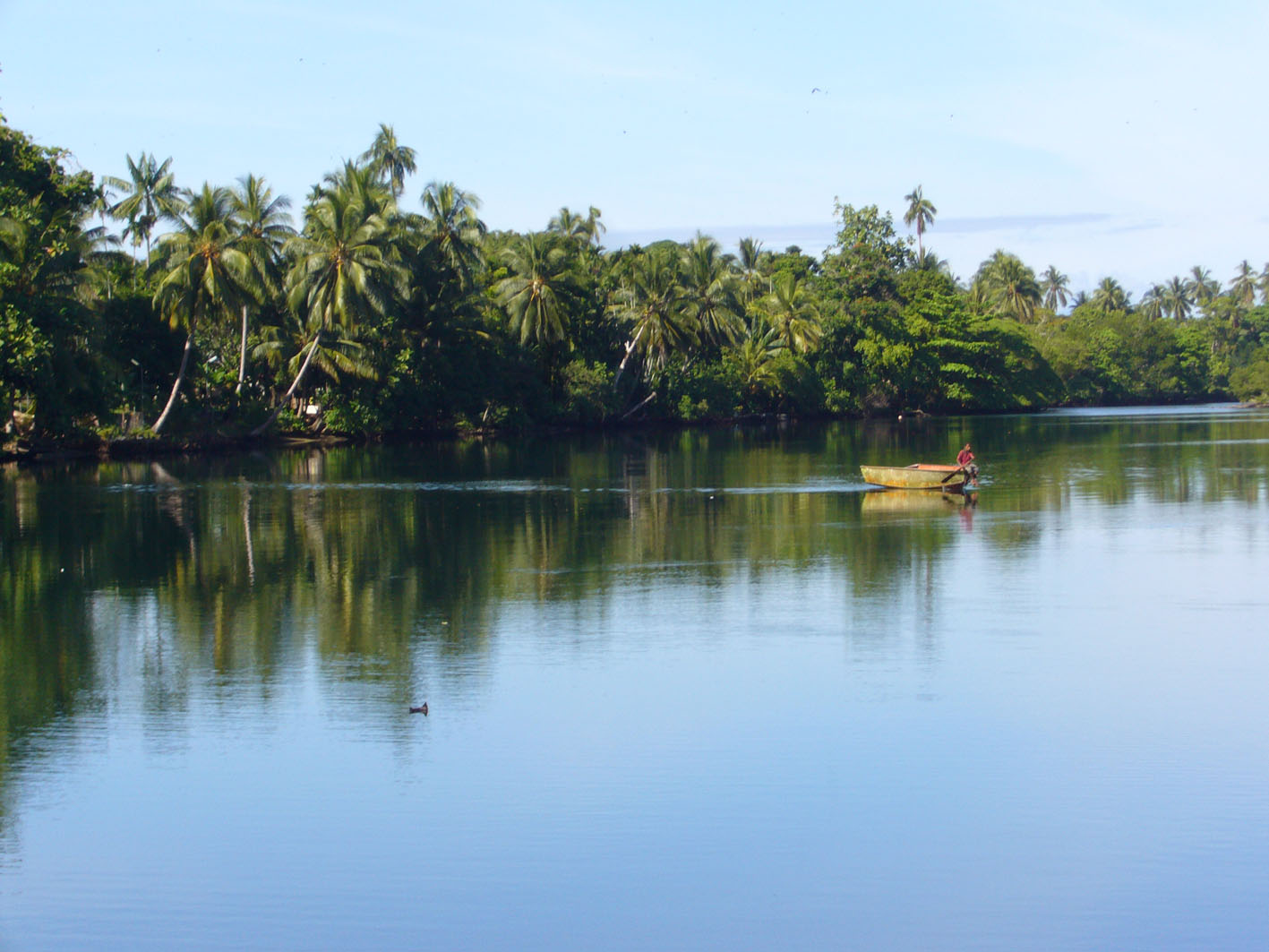
Madang lagoon

== Notable people ==
- Yolarnie Amepou – herpetologist and conservationist.
- Nichola Goddard – Canadian soldier KIA in Afghanistan, born in Madang

== Sister cities ==
Madang's sister cities are:

- (United States) Poplar, Wisconsin, USA

== See also ==
- Bilibil
- List of towns in Papua New Guinea
- Madang District
- Madang Urban LLG
- Naval Base Alexishafen
