= Upper/Lower Koronigl Rural LLG =

Local-level government in Papua New Guinea

- Country: Papua New Guinea
- Province: Chimbu Province
- Time zone: UTC+10 (AEST)

Upper/Lower Koronigl Rural LLG is a local-level government (LLG) of Chimbu Province, Papua New Guinea.

== Wards ==
1. Dage Mitna 1
2. Dage Mitna 2
3. Dage Mitna 3
4. Dageyogombo 1
5. Dageyogombo 2
6. Kamaneku (Supma-Akaduku-Kalaku Siure)
7. Siku (Goglme)
8. Kameneku 2 (Kendkane-Darabuno)
9. Pagau 1 (Benganduku-Dawage)
10. Pagau 2 (Benganduku-Bunamugl)
11. Pagau/Sibaigu (Kondan)
12. Pagau 3 (Komkane-Nombuna)
13. Pagau 4 (Komkane-Angagoi)
14. Giraiku 1 (Akbanige)
15. Giraiku 2 (Wirebris)
16. Bindiku (Kawa)
17. Bindiku
18. Damba
19. Nimaikane (Goglmugl)
20. Dageyogombo 3
21. Dageminta 4
22. Kamaneku/Siambula (Gagugl)
