= Wasu Rural LLG =

Local-level government in Papua New Guinea

- Location within Papua New Guinea
- Coordinates: _source:enwiki&title=Wasu+Station 5.961342°S 147.19392°E
- Country: Papua New Guinea
- Province: Morobe Province
- Time zone: UTC+10 (AEST)

Wasu Rural LLG is a local-level government (LLG) of Morobe Province, Papua New Guinea.

During World War II, the Battle of Sio took place in the LLG.

== Wards ==
- 01. Yakawa
- 02. Sio 2
- 03. Sio 1
- 04. Kulavi
- 05. Wasu Station
- 06. Kiari
- 07. Weleki
- 08. Towat
- 09. Welowelo
- 10. Singorokai
- 11. Roinji (Ronji language speakers)
- 12. Hungo
- 13. Satop
- 14. Wawet
- 15. Domut
- 16. Belombibi
- 17. Karangan
- 18. Niniea
