= Karimui Rural LLG =

Local-level government in Papua New Guinea

- Location within Papua New Guinea
- Coordinates: 6.495447°S 144.827954°E
- Country: Papua New Guinea
- Province: Chimbu Province
- Time zone: UTC+10 (AEST)

Karimui Rural LLG is a local-level government (LLG) of Chimbu Province, Papua New Guinea.

== Wards ==
1. Yuro 1
2. Yuro 2
3. Huwaiyo
4. Wario
5. Karimui Station 1
6. Karimui Station 2
7. Norowai
8. Boisamaru 1
9. Boisamaru 2
10. Yogoromaru
11. Dibe 1
12. Dibe 2
13. Negabo
14. Tua 1
15. Tua 2 (Tilige)
16. Masi
17. Maina 1
18. Maina 2
19. Solari (Noru)
20. Sola
21. Waiamani (Dobu)
22. Dobea
23. Orotabe (Bomai)
24. Unane
25. Suruka (Kapi)
26. Haia
27. Soliabeto
