= NOF =

NOF may refer to:

== Medicine ==
- Neck of femur, connecting bone head and shaft
- Non-ossifying fibroma

== Organisations ==
- National Fascist Community (Národní obec fašistická), a Czechoslovak Fascist movement
- National Liberation Front (Macedonia) (Macedonian: Народноослободителен фронт [НОФ], romanized: Narodnoosloboditelen front [NOF]), a Slavic Macedonian organisation that was merged into the Democratic Army of Greece during the Greek civil war
- Norsk Ornitlogisk Forening, Norwegian name of the Norwegian Ornithological Society
- NOF (radio station), a 1920s U.S. Navy radio station in Anacostia, D.C.

== Other ==
- NetObjects Fusion, a web design tool
- Nitrosyl fluoride
- Nomane language, by ISO 639 code
- NOFX

== See also ==
- Noph (disambiguation).
