= Gena/Waugla Rural LLG =

Local-level government in Papua New Guinea

- Country: Papua New Guinea
- Province: Chimbu Province
- Time zone: UTC+10 (AEST)

Gena/Waugla Rural LLG is a local-level government (LLG) of Chimbu Province, Papua New Guinea.

== Wards ==
1. Nogar
2. Mukuna
3. Bombir
4. Kendine
5. Kambang
6. Sim
7. Dimbinyaundo
8. Duglgambagl
9. Kunbi
10. Kombuku
11. Siambugla Waugku
12. Saimgugla Wauku
13. Genayogombo
14. Boomgate
