= Yonggomugl Rural LLG =

Local-level government in Papua New Guinea

- Location within Papua New Guinea
- Coordinates: 6.01°S 145.04°E
- Country: Papua New Guinea
- Province: Chimbu Province
- Time zone: UTC+10 (AEST)

Yonggomugl Rural LLG is a local-level government (LLG) of Chimbu Province, Papua New Guinea.

== Wards ==
1. Mogl
2. Kagai
3. Guruma 1
4. Guruma 2
5. Muasugo
6. Mai
7. Mai
8. Niglguma 1
9. Niglguma 2
10. Niglguma 3
11. Ku 1
12. Ku 2
