= Baiyer Rural LLG =

Local-level government in Papua New Guinea

- Country: Papua New Guinea
- Province: Western Highlands Province
- Time zone: UTC+10 (AEST)

Baiyer Rural LLG is a local-level government (LLG) of Western Highlands Province, Papua New Guinea.

== Wards ==
- 01. Pokotapugl
- 02. Manjip
- 03. Sanap
- 04. Keluape 1
- 05. Keluape 2
- 06. Lyaporambo 2
- 07. Lyaporambo 1
- 08. Kaleta
- 09. Kuipbaut 1
- 10. Kuipbaut 2
- 11. Rolga
- 12. Endeman
- 13. Jukuna
- 14. Tapikama 1
- 15. Tapikama 2
- 16. Kaliponga
- 17. Yaramanda 1
- 18. Yaramanda 2
- 19. Yaramanda 3
- 20. Pakalts 1
- 21. Pakalts 2
- 22. Dalapana 1
- 23. Dalapana 2
- 24. Dalapana 3
- 25. Kulimbu 1
- 26. Kulimbu 2
- 27. Mandawasa 1
- 28. Mandawasa 2
- 29. Kalepale
- 30. Simunga
- 31. Kanan 1
- 32. Kanan 2
- 33. Yakasmanda 1
- 34. Yakasmanda 2
- 35. Iki 1
- 36. Iki 2
- 37. Dekenapona
- 38. Antengena. 1
- 39. Keld
- 40. Gelg 1
- 41. Gelg 2
- 42. Kul
- 43. Pila
- 44. Opa
- 45. Ruti
- 46. Tinsley Health Centre
- 47. Baiyer Station
