= Ronji language =

Austronesian language spoken in Papua New Guinea

Ronji
- Uma
- Native to: Papua New Guinea
- Region: Madang–Morobe
- Native speakers: 450 (2003)
- Language family: Austronesian: Malayo-Polynesian; Oceanic; Western Oceanic; Ngero–Vitiaz; Roinji–Nenaya; Ronji

Language codes
- ISO 639-3: roe
- Glottolog: ronj1237

Ronji, or Uma, is a minor Austronesian language of northern Papua New Guinea.

== Locations ==
Ronji is spoken in two villages, one in Morobe Province and one in Madang Province:

- Roinji village (5.856964°S 146.795048°E), Wasu Rural LLG, Morobe Province
- Gali village (5.797196°S 146.722531°E), Bonga ward, Rai Coast Rural LLG, Madang Province
