= Gumine District =

- Location within Papua New Guinea
- Coordinates: 6.196°S 144.906°E
- Country: Papua New Guinea
- Province: Chimbu Province
- Capital: Gumine

Area
  - Total: 708 km^{2} (273 sq mi)

Population (2011 census)
  - Total: 56,860
  - Density: 80.3/km^{2} (208/sq mi)
- Time zone: UTC+10 (AEST)

Gumine District is a district of the Simbu Province of Papua New Guinea. Its capital is Gumine. The population was 56,860 at the 2011 census. Gumine District comprises the following major tribes and language groups:

1. Dom (Karamaril, Minuma, Gaima) 2. Era (Moremaule, Buli) 3. Mian (Gumine Station, Tagla) 4. Kia (Omkolai) 5. Golin (Boromil, Yani, Dirima, Bokolma, Mul) 6. Yuri (Dia, Gomgale, Waramond 7. Sa (Nondri, Amia)
