= Sinasina language =

Language

Sinasina
- Native to: Papua New Guinea
- Region: Tabare Rural LLG, Chimbu Province
- Native speakers: (21,000 cited 2000 census)
- Language family: Trans–New Guinea: Chimbu–Wahgi; Chimbu; Sinasina

Language codes
- ISO 639-3: sst
- Glottolog: sina1271

Sinasina is a term used to refer to for several Chimbu–Wahgi language varieties of Tabare Rural LLG (also called Sinasina), Simbu Province, Papua New Guinea. The term 'Sinasina' as a language name is an exonym. Speakers of the varieties of this region instead refer to their languages with tok ples vernacular languages endonyms, including: Dinga, Gunangi, Kebai, Kere, Kondo, Nimai, Tabare. The Kere community also has a deaf sign language, Sinasina Sign Language.

== See also ==
- Sinasina Sign Language
