= Steven Pim =

Papua New Guinean politician (died 2023)

Member of the National Parliament of Papua New Guinea
- In office 22 July 2022 – 24 September 2023
- Preceded by: Wesley Nukundj
- Succeeded by: Desmond Paul Kipa
- Constituency: Dei District

Personal details
- Died: 24 September 2023 Port Moresby, Papua New Guinea
- Party: PNC
- Education: University of Papua New Guinea (BA)

Steven Pim (died 24 September 2023) was a Papua New Guinean politician of the People's National Congress (PNC).

== Biography ==
After growing up in the Western Highlands Province, Pim earned a Bachelor of Arts in political science from the University of Papua New Guinea. He was elected to the National Parliament in 2022. He was appointed Shadow Minister of Petroleum and Gas by Joseph Lelang. During his time as an MP, he authorized the installation of 250 solar panels in the Dei District to provide lighting for all sorts of buildings, as well as the main highway linking the district to the rest of the country.

Steven Pim died of a heart attack in Port Moresby on 24 September 2023.
