= Bilibil people =

Ethnicity

Prior to 1904, the Bilibil people lived on an island offshore from Madang, Papua New Guinea, trading clay pots along the coast from Karkar Island to western Morobe Province. The island was too small to produce enough food for the inhabitants, and the trade therefore was an essential element of their life. They moved to the mainland to their existing village site to improve their subsistence levels. They speak the Bilibil language, an Austronesian language.

== Pot making ==
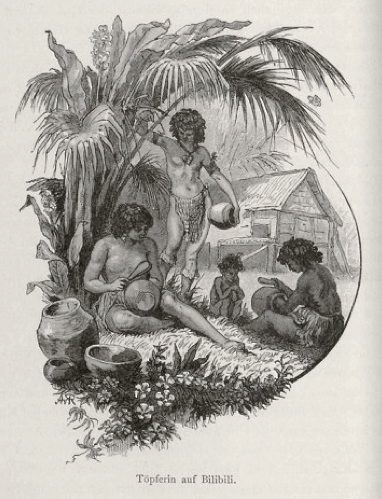
Women potters from Bilibil, 1884-1885 sketch by Otto Finsch

Bilibil women make pots, which are still produced in the traditional way. Clay for the pots is collected locally, and mixed with sand and water. The pots are hollowed out with stones and smoothed on the outside by beating with a flat board. Before they are fired, red clay is painted on the pots. This turns them a glossy red and black when they are pulled out of the fire.

The pots are put to many uses; most importantly, they are used for bride price ceremonies. Sometimes pots are still bartered for food. Inland people meet the Bilibils at a pre-arranged place, and pots are exchanged for taro and yams from the mountains. No money is used in these exchanges.

== Relationship to the ocean ==
Traditionally the Bilibils have been great seamen. They built large two-masted canoes which they would use to travel hundreds of kilometres along the coast to trade with other villages. Tools for boat building were made from wood, pigs' bone, sharpened bamboo and stone. In 1978, it had been 40 years since a traditional canoe had been built by the Bilibil people, and the skills for building these boats had been almost lost. Four elderly men taught the others how to build a canoe using local trees for the hull, the outrigger and the supports. The sail was woven out of pandanus leaves, a shelter was built from bamboo with palm leaves for a roof, and a wooden cockatoo, a clan totem, was attached to the mast.

== Bilibil traditions ==
Traditional houses had roofs that came to the ground, and each clan had a men's house which the women were not allowed to enter. Nowadays each family lives in their own house. They are made from bush materials and have large airy verandahs. The houses are about two metres off the ground; the women sit underneath and make their pots.

Most of the cooking and eating is done outside. Yams and taro are the staple diet and these are grown in large gardens behind the village. The men do the initial preparation of a new garden, but the women do most of the gardening. The yams are ready for harvest in June, and the harvest is celebrated with yam feasts. June is also the traditional new year as marked by the appearance of the Pleiades.

Young men are initiated into manhood by the older Bilibil men who take them over to Bilibil Island for about 12 days and instruct them in the way to behave as adults. When they return to the village, they are paraded through the houses and a celebration is held with feasting and dancing.
