= Gumine Rural LLG =

Local-level government in Papua New Guinea

- Location within Papua New Guinea
- Coordinates: 6.28°S 144.82°E
- Country: Papua New Guinea
- Province: Chimbu Province
- Time zone: UTC+10 (AEST)

Gumine Rural LLG is a local-level government (LLG) of Chimbu Province, Papua New Guinea.

== Wards ==
1. Tagala
2. Omkolai 1
3. Omkolai 2
4. Yani
5. Milinkane
6. Bomaigaulin
7. Kipaku
8. Aleku
9. Kaleku
10. Koiyaku
11. Nigemarime
12. Gumine Stn
13. Kunarku
14. Milaku
15. Neraku
16. Egeku
17. Neraku
18. Sabamingaulin
19. Sanigekain
20. Satobuku
21. Kumaikaine
