= Madang Museum =

Local museum in Madang, Papua New Guinea

- Established: 6 June 1981
- Location: Madang, Papua New Guinea
- Coordinates: 5.2261938°S 145.800925°E
- Type: Local

Madang Museum is a museum in Madang, Papua New Guinea, which displays objects from its locality and the East Sepik province.

== Background ==
In 1975 the suggestion arose that a local museum should be created in Madang, an idea that was supported by the government of the province, expatriates, and local tourist businesses. The museum opened on 6 June 1981. It was opened by Kaki Angi, then Minister for Tourism for the province. The museum shares a building with the Madang Visitors and Cultural Bureau. In 2015 the museum underwent a restoration programme, led by ethnographer and volunteer Mary Mennis. Madang Provincial Government covers wages and utility costs for the museum, but other funding comes from private donations.

== Collections and research ==
The museum collection contains both ethnographic and natural science objects. One notable object is a head-dress from Bosmum village which was worn as part of a male initiation ritual. As of 2008 approximately half of the objects on display were from Madang and the rest from East Sepik Province. The museum was a partner in a research project which explored diet in the region over the last millennium through zooarchaeological analysis, as well as lipid analysis.
