= Adumo =

Town in Papua New Guinea

Coordinates: 6°39′S 145°12′E

Adumo is a town in Chimbu Province, in the Highlands Region of Papua New Guinea.
