= Bilibil language =

Austronesian language spoken in Papua New Guinea

Bil Bil
- Native to: Papua New Guinea
- Region: south of Madang town, Madang Province
- Ethnicity: Bilibil
- Native speakers: 1,300 (2003)
- Language family: Austronesian: Malayo-Polynesian; Oceanic; Western Oceanic; North New Guinea ?; Ngero–Vitiaz; Bel; Nuclear Bel; Northern; Bil Bil

Language codes
- ISO 639-3: brz
- Glottolog: bilb1241

Bil Bil is an Austronesian language spoken by about 1,200 people near Madang town, Madang Province, Papua New Guinea.
