= Nomane language =

Trans–New Guinea language

Nomane
- Native to: Papua New Guinea
- Region: Chimbu Province
- Native speakers: (6,700 cited 2000 census)
- Language family: Trans–New Guinea: Chimbu–Wahgi; Chimbu; Nomane

Language codes
- ISO 639-3: nof
- Glottolog: noma1262

Nomane is a Trans–New Guinea language of Nomane Rural LLG, Chimbu Province, Papua New Guinea.
