= Kup Rural LLG =

Local-level government in Papua New Guinea

- Location within Papua New Guinea
- Coordinates: 6.057931°S 144.881758°E
- Country: Papua New Guinea
- Province: Chimbu Province
- Time zone: UTC+10 (AEST)

Kup Rural LLG is one of the Local Level Government of Kerowagi District in the Chimbu Province, Papua New Guinea.

It is made up of three Tribes, the first one is Kumai, these are the people who lives close to the LLG and share border with the Jiwaka, the second one Gurikunana, and lastly is Bari. The Kumais lives near to the Waghi Valley so their land is very fertile to grow food crops. The Gurikunana people live up to the bush on rocky mountains with the Baris where they enjoy their own lives hunting in the big jungle.

== Wards ==
1. Kumga
2. Kumai Bonmeku
3. Yuri
4. Kuma Deingeku
5. Kuma Kindingapam
6. Endugla Nanginku
7. Endugla Kunaunaku 1
8. Endugla Kunaunaku 2
9. Yopa
10. Bandi No. 2
11. Bandi No. 1
