= Chuave language =

Language

Chuave
- Native to: Papua New Guinea
- Region: Chimbu Province and Eastern Highlands Province
- Native speakers: (26,000 cited 2000)
- Language family: Trans–New Guinea: Chimbu–Wahgi; Chimbu; Chuave

Language codes
- ISO 639-3: cjv
- Glottolog: chua1250

Chuave is a Trans–New Guinea language of Chimbu Province and Eastern Highlands Province, Papua New Guinea.

Chuave is spoken in Elimbari Rural LLG, Chuave District, and Lufa District, Eastern Highlands Province.

== Phonology ==
=== Vowels ===
	Front	Central	Back
Close	i		u
Mid	e		o
Open		ɑ	

=== Consonants ===
Consonants
	Labial	Alveolar	Palatal	Velar
Nasal	m	n		
Plosive	b	t d		k g
Fricative	f	s		
Tap		ɾ		
Approximant	w		j	
