= Saidor =

Coordinates: 05°37′39″S 146°27′27″E

Saidor is a village located in Saidor ward of Rai Coast Rural LLG, Madang Province, on the north coast of Papua New Guinea.

It is also the administrative centre of the Rai Coast District of Madang Province in Papua New Guinea. The village was the site of the Saidor landing during the New Guinea campaign of World War II.
