= Islands Region =

Region of Papua New Guinea

New Guinea Islands Region
- Region
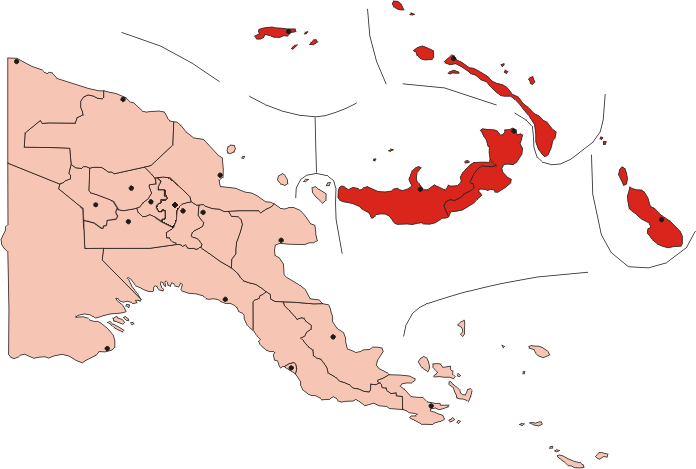
- Coordinates: 4°21′S 152°16′E
- Country: Papua New Guinea
- Largest city: Arawa

Area
  - Total: 56,602 km^{2} (21,854 sq mi)

Population (2021)
  - Total: 1,761,841
  - Density: 31.127/km^{2} (80.618/sq mi)
- Time zone: UTC+10:00 (PNGST)

The New Guinea Islands Region is one of four regions of Papua New Guinea (PNG), comprising the Bismarck Archipelago and north-western Solomon Islands Archipelago, located north-east of New Guinea island (the mainland).

This is the least populous inhabited region of the country with an estimated population of 1,761,841 (approximately 15% of PNG) in 2021.

It is distinct through its prehistory and history, as shown by the prevalence of Austronesian languages, and archeological findings of Lapita pottery culture.

== Subdivision ==
The Region is administratively divided into five provinces:

- Bougainville (North Solomons)
- East New Britain
- Manus
- New Ireland
- West New Britain

== See also ==
- Bougainville Island
- Provinces of Papua New Guinea
