= Wasu, Papua New Guinea =

Wasu is a town in Papua New Guinea. It is the capital of Tewae-Siassi District in Morobe Province, and is located on the Huon Peninsula. Wasu also serves as a gateway town for the Kabwum District, and is the seat of Wasu Rural LLG.

Wasu is also a small town that serves all of Kabwum District, Tewae Siassi District and part of Madang Province.

The town was established in the early 1900s when the first Lutheran Missionaries came. Wasu was used as their port.

== Climate ==
Wasu has a tropical rainforest climate (Af) with heavy rainfall year-round.

Climate data for Wasu
Month	Jan	Feb	Mar	Apr	May	Jun	Jul	Aug	Sep	Oct	Nov	Dec	Year
Mean daily maximum °C (°F)	30.8 (87.4)	31.1 (88.0)	30.6 (87.1)	30.7 (87.3)	30.4 (86.7)	29.6 (85.3)	29.3 (84.7)	29.6 (85.3)	30.6 (87.1)	30.6 (87.1)	31.3 (88.3)	30.9 (87.6)	30.5 (86.8)
Daily mean °C (°F)	26.8 (80.2)	27.0 (80.6)	26.8 (80.2)	26.6 (79.9)	26.6 (79.9)	26.1 (79.0)	25.6 (78.1)	25.7 (78.3)	26.6 (79.9)	26.5 (79.7)	27.0 (80.6)	26.9 (80.4)	26.5 (79.7)
Mean daily minimum °C (°F)	22.8 (73.0)	22.9 (73.2)	23.0 (73.4)	22.6 (72.7)	22.8 (73.0)	22.6 (72.7)	22.0 (71.6)	21.9 (71.4)	22.6 (72.7)	22.5 (72.5)	22.7 (72.9)	22.9 (73.2)	22.6 (72.7)
Average precipitation mm (inches)	287 (11.3)	271 (10.7)	308 (12.1)	268 (10.6)	170 (6.7)	155 (6.1)	147 (5.8)	151 (5.9)	125 (4.9)	160 (6.3)	188 (7.4)	250 (9.8)	2,480 (97.6)
Source: Climate-Data.org
