= Madang District =

- Location within Papua New Guinea
- Coordinates: 5°05′S 145°37′E
- Country: Papua New Guinea
- Province: Madang Province
- Capital: Madang

Area
  - Total: 2,696 km^{2} (1,041 sq mi)

Population (2024 census)
  - Total: 175,289
  - Density: 65.02/km^{2} (168.4/sq mi)
- Time zone: UTC+10 (AEST)
- Postal code: 511

Madang District is a district in the central part of Madang Province in Papua New Guinea. It is one of the six administrative districts that make up the province.
