= Momase Region =

Region of Papua New Guinea

- Region
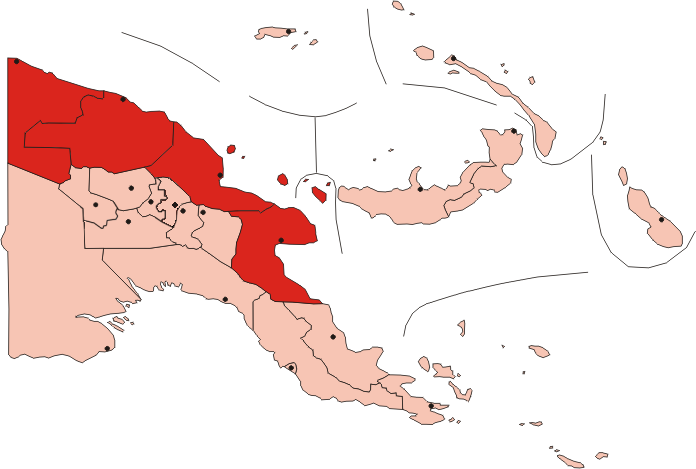
- Coordinates: 3°34′31″S 143°38′23″E
- Country: Papua New Guinea
- Largest city: Lae

Area
  - Total: 142,600 km^{2} (55,100 sq mi)

Population (2024 Census)
  - Total: 2,753,211
  - Estimate (2021 Estimate): 3,040,584
  - Density: 19.31/km^{2} (50.01/sq mi)
- Time zone: UTC+10:00 (PNGST)

Momase Region is one of four regions of Papua New Guinea. Its largest city is Lae, the second-largest city of the country. The name Momase is a portmanteau of its four constituent provinces: Morobe, Madang, and Sepik (East Sepik and West Sepik). Momase is by far the most linguistically diverse region of Papua New Guinea.

== Provinces ==
The region is administratively divided into four provinces:

- East Sepik
- Madang
- Morobe
- Sandaun (West Sepik)

== See also ==
- Provinces of Papua New Guinea
