= Southern Region, Papua New Guinea =

Southern Region
- Region
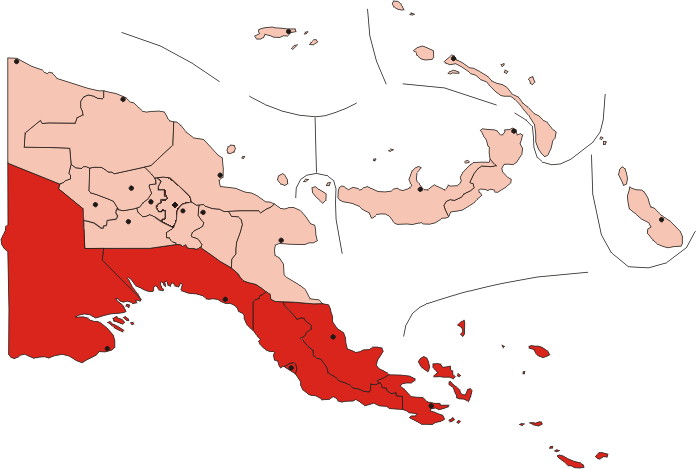
- Coordinates: 7°55′S 145°50′E
- Country: Papua New Guinea
- Largest city: Port Moresby

Area
  - Total: 202,542 km^{2} (78,202 sq mi)

Population (2021)
  - Total: 2,412,736
  - Density: 11.9123/km^{2} (30.8527/sq mi)
- Time zone: UTC+10 (AEST)

Southern Region (formerly Papua Region) is one of four regions of Papua New Guinea. The region includes the national capital Port Moresby.

== Subdivision ==
The Region is administratively divided into six provinces:

- Central
- Gulf
- Milne Bay
- Oro (Northern)
- Western (Fly River)
- National Capital District (Port Moresby)

== See also ==
- Papua (disambiguation)
- Provinces of Papua New Guinea
- Territory of Papua
- Territory of Papua and New Guinea
