= Austrian Federal Computing Centre =

Public information technology service provider

- Native name: Bundesrechenzentrum
- Type: Limited liability company
- Genre: Information and communication technology
- Founded: 1997
- Headquarters: Vienna, Austria
- Key people: Roland Ledinger, Maria Ulmer
- Revenue: 559 M Euro (2025)
- Number of employees: 1,800 (2026)
- Website: en.brz.gv.at

The Austrian Federal Computing Centre or Bundesrechenzentrum (BRZ) is a public information technology (IT) service provider based in Vienna. The organisation develops and operates e-government services for the Austrian Federal Government, including the Federal Ministries and the Federal Chancellery. In 1997 the BRZ was outsourced from the Ministry of Finance as an organisational spin-off on the basis of a Federal Law, since then it acts as a limited liability company. The Austrian Federal Computing Centre is owned by the Republic of Austria, represented by the Ministry of Finance.

== Business area ==
The BRZ owns one of the largest data centres in the country, provides infrastructure and supervises more than 30,000 IT workstations. Its core market consists of the ministries, the Chancellery, supreme authorities, universities and outsourced organizations.

Among the most well-known applications developed by the BRZ are the digital government platform oesterreich.gv.at, FinanzOnline, JustizOnline, federal budget accounting and human resources management (SAP), ID Austria, e-Customs, the Corporate Service Portal (usp.gv.at), the Commercial and Land Registers, the electronic dunning process, ELAK (the federal electronic file management system), data.gv.at, Austrian Student Union (ÖH) elections (including e-voting in 2009, election administration systems in 2015, 2017, and 2019, and online applications for absentee ballots), biometric passports, the health portal, portal.at, access management for ELGA (the electronic health record), the official digital signature service, and electronic document delivery. The BRZ also operates the identification platform that serves as the foundation for electronic forms of identification, such as the digital driver’s license.

With its "Large Language Model as a Service" (LLMaaS), the BRZ has developed a platform that enables the use of large language models within a secure and scalable environment. This solution is operated entirely within the BRZ’s own data centers and complies with the requirements of the General Data Protection Regulation (GDPR).

== International ==
The BRZ is involved in EU-wide projects and collaborations, such as Euritas (European Alliance of Public IT Service Providers), Cloud4Europe (Cloud Computing in Europe), PEPPOL (Pan-European Public Procurement Online), STORK (Secure Identity Across Borders Linked) and eCodex (European e-justice system).

== Sources ==
- Company report 2013 of the Austrian Federal Computing Centre
