= Highlands Region =

- Region
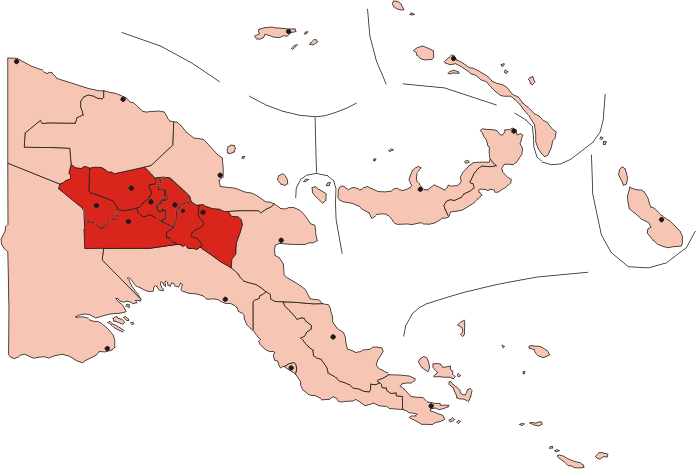
- Coordinates: 5°52′S 144°13′E
- Country: Papua New Guinea
- Largest city: Mount Hagen

Area
  - Total: 62,400 km^{2} (24,100 sq mi)

Population (2021)
  - Total: 4,566,398
  - Density: 73.2/km^{2} (190/sq mi)
- Time zone: UTC+10 (AEST)

Highlands Region is one of four regions of Papua New Guinea.

== Subdivision ==
The Highlands Region is administratively divided into seven provinces:

- Chimbu (Simbu)
- Eastern Highlands
- Enga
- Hela
- Jiwaka
- Southern Highlands
- Western Highlands

== See also ==
- Provinces of Papua New Guinea
