= Madang Province =

Province of Papua New Guinea

Madang Province Madang Provins (Tok Pisin)
- Flag

- Madang Province in Papua New Guinea
- Coordinates: 5°10′S 145°20′E
- Country: Papua New Guinea
- Region: Momase
- Capital: Madang
- Districts: List: Bogia District; Madang District; Middle Ramu District; Rai Coast District; Sumkar District; Usino Bundi District

Government
  - Governor: Ramsey Pariwa

Area
  - Total: 28,886 km^{2} (11,153 sq mi)

Population (2024 Census)
  - Total: 761,154
  - Estimate (2021): 797,807
  - Density: 26.350/km^{2} (68.247/sq mi)
- Time zone: UTC+10 (AEST)
- HDI (2018): 0.545 low · 13th of 22

Madang is a province of Papua New Guinea. The province is on the northern coast of mainland Papua New Guinea and has many of the country's highest peaks, active volcanoes and its biggest mix of languages. The capital is the town of Madang.

== Districts and LLGs and clans ==
Each province in Papua New Guinea has one or more districts, and each district has one or more Local Level Government (LLG) areas. For census purposes, the LLG areas are subdivided into wards and those into census units.

District	District Capital	LLG Name
Bogia District	Bogia	Almami Rural
Bogia District	Bogia	Iabu Rural
Bogia District	Bogia	Yawar Rural
Madang District	Madang	Ambenob Rural
Madang District	Madang	Madang Urban
Madang District	Madang	Transgogol Rural
Middle Ramu District	Simbai	Arabaka Rural
Middle Ramu District	Simbai	Josephstaal Rural
Middle Ramu District	Simbai	Simbai Rural
Middle Ramu District	Simbai	Kovon Rural
Rai Coast District	Saidor	Astrolabe Bay Rural
Rai Coast District	Saidor	Naho Rawa Rural
Rai Coast District	Saidor	Nayudo Rural
Rai Coast District	Saidor	Rai Coast (Saidor)
Sumkar District	Karkar	Karkar Rural
Sumkar District	Karkar	Sumgilbar Rural
Usino Bundi District	Usino	Bundi Rural
Usino Bundi District	Usino	Usino Rural
Usino Bundi District	Usino	Gama Rural

== Education ==
Tertiary educational institutions in Madang Province include:

- Madang Technical College
- Madang Marine Time College
- Madang Teachers College
- Divine Word University (DWU) is a national university and a leading tertiary institution in Papua New Guinea. Formerly Divine Word Institute, it was established by an Act of Parliament in 1980 and was established as a University in 1996. DWU It is ecumenical, coeducational and privately governed with government support.

== Provincial leaders ==
The province was governed by a decentralised provincial administration, headed by a Premier, from 1978 to 1995. Following reforms taking effect that year, the national government reassumed some powers, and the role of Premier was replaced by a position of Governor, to be held by the winner of the province-wide seat in the National Parliament of Papua New Guinea.

=== Premiers (1978–1995) ===
Premier	Term
Bato Bultin	1978–1984
Max Moeder	1985–1986
Andrew Ariako	1986–1993
provincial government suspended	1993–1995

=== Governors (1995–present) ===
Governor	Term
Peter Barter	1995–1997
Jim Kas	1997–2000
Pengau Nengo (acting)	2000–2002
Stahl Musa	2002
James Yali	2002–2007
Arnold Amet	2007–2008
Buka Malai (acting)	2008–2009
Arnold Amet	2009–2011
James Gau	2011–2012
Jim Kas	2012–2017
Peter Yama	2017–2022
Ramsey Pariwa	2022–present

== Members of the National Parliament ==
The province and each district is represented by a Member of the National Parliament. There is one provincial electorate and each district is an open electorate.

Electorate	Member
Madang Provincial	Ramsey Pariwa
Bogia Open	Robert Naguri
Madang Open	Bryan Jared Kramer
Middle Ramu Open	Jonny Alonk
Rai Coast Open	Kessy Sawang
Sumkar Open	Alexander Orme
Usino-Bundi Open	Jimmy Uguro

== Notable people ==
- Yolarnie Amepou - herpetologist and conservationist.
- Julia Mage’au Gray - choreographer and tattoo artist.
