= Western Highlands Province =

Province in Papua New Guinea

Western Highlands Province Westen Hailans Provins (Tok Pisin)
- Flag

- Western Highlands Province in Papua New Guinea
- Coordinates: 5°40′S 144°30′E
- Country: Papua New Guinea
- Capital: Mount Hagen
- Districts: List: Dei District; Mount Hagen District; Mul-Baiyer District; Tambul-Nebilyer District

Government
  - Governor: Wai Rapa 2022-present

Area
  - Total: 4,299 km^{2} (1,660 sq mi)

Population (2011 census)
  - Total: 362,580
  - Density: 84.34/km^{2} (218.4/sq mi)
- Time zone: UTC+10 (AEST)
- HDI (2019): 0.585 medium · 8th of 22

Western Highlands is a province of Papua New Guinea. The provincial capital is Mount Hagen. The province covers an area of 4,299 km^{2}, and there are 362,850 inhabitants (2011 census), making the Western Highlands the most densely populated province (apart from the National Capital District). Tea and coffee are grown in the Western Highlands.

== Split to create Jiwaka Province ==
In July 2009, Parliament passed legislation to create two new provinces by 2012. One of these was to be created by removing Jimi District, North Waghi District, and the South Waghi part of Anglimp-South Waghi District from the Western Highlands Province to form the new Jiwaka Province. "Jiwaka" is a portmanteau combining the first two letters each of Jimi, Waghi and Kambia.

Jiwaka Province officially came into being on 17 May 2012.

== Economy ==
The Western Highlands economy is primarily based on coffee. Coffee is grown on plantations and small-holder blocks. They are picked, dried and processed for export. In addition, tea is also a major crop grown and processed, but in plantations by W. R. Carpenter & Co Ltd for local consumption and export. Apart from these, vegetables are grown for the domestic market, and sold mainly to markets Lae and Port Moresby.

== Districts and LLGs ==
Since the separation of Jiwaka there are now four districts in the province. Each district has one or more Local Level Government (LLG) areas. For census purposes, the LLG areas are subdivided into wards and those into census units.

District	District Capital	LLG Name
Dei District	Dei	Dei Rural (Muglamp)
Dei District	Dei	Kotna Rural
Mount Hagen District	Mount Hagen	Mount Hagen Rural
Mount Hagen District	Mount Hagen	Mount Hagen Urban
Mul-Baiyer District	Baiyer	Baiyer Rural
Mul-Baiyer District	Baiyer	Lumusa Rural
Mul-Baiyer District	Baiyer	Mul Rural
Tambul-Nebilyer District	Tambul	Mount Giluwe Rural
Tambul-Nebilyer District	Tambul	Nebilyer Rural

== Provincial leaders ==
The province was governed by a decentralised provincial administration, headed by a Premier, from 1978 to 1995. Following reforms taking effect that year, the national government reassumed some powers, and the role of Premier was replaced by a position of Governor, to be held by the winner of the province-wide seat in the National Parliament of Papua New Guinea.

=== Premiers (1978–1995) ===
Premier	Term
Nambuga Mara	1978–1984
Kagul Koroka	1984
Philip Kapal	1984–1987
provincial government suspended	1987
Philip Kapal	1987–1990
Lukas Roika	1990–1992
provincial government suspended	1992–1995

=== Governors (1995–present) ===
Governor	Term
Paias Wingti	1995–1997
Zuriel Voivoi	1997–2002
Paias Wingti	2002–2007
Tom Olga	2007–2012
Paias Wingti	2017–2022
Wai Rapa	Since 2022

== Members of the National Parliament ==
The province and each district is represented by a Member of the National Parliament. There is one provincial electorate and each district is an open electorate.

Electorate	Member
Western Provincial	Wai Rapa
Baiyer-Mul Open	Jacob Maki
Dei Open	Steven Pim
Hagen Open	William Duma
Tambul-Nebilyer Open	Win Bakri Daki
