= Chimbu Province =

Province in Papua New Guinea

Chimbu Province Simbu Provins (Tok Pisin) Simbu Province
- Flag

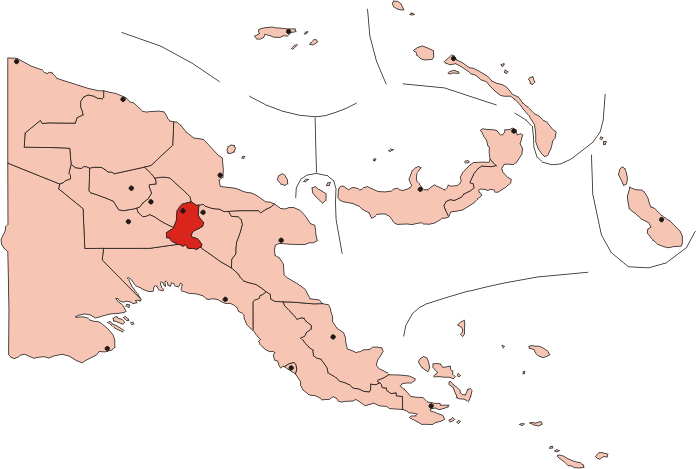

- Location within Papua New Guinea
- Coordinates: 6°26′S 145°0′E
- Country: Papua New Guinea
- Formation: 1966
- Capital: Kundiawa
- Districts: List: Chauve District; Gumine District; Karimui-Nomane District; Kerowagi District; Kundiawa-Gembogl District; Sina Sina-Yonggomugl District

Government
  - Governor: Noah Kool

Area
  - Total: 6,112 km^{2} (2,360 sq mi)

Population (2011 census)
  - Total: 376,473
  - Density: 61.60/km^{2} (159.5/sq mi)
- Time zone: UTC+10 (AEST)
- HDI (2018): 0.557 medium · 9th of 22

Chimbu, also spelled Simbu, is a province in the Highlands Region of Papua New Guinea. The province has an area of 6,112 km^{2} and a population of 376,473 (2011 census). The capital of the province is Kundiawa. Mount Wilhelm, the tallest mountain in Papua New Guinea is on the border of Eastern part of Simbu and the Western part of Madang Province.

== Geography ==
Chimbu is located in the central highlands cordillera of Papua New Guinea. It shares geographic and political boundaries with five provinces: Jiwaka, Eastern Highlands, Southern Highlands, Gulf and Madang. It is a significant source of organically produced coffee.

Chimbu is a province with limited natural resources and very rugged mountainous terrain. The economic progress of the province has been slower than some other highlands provinces.

== Education ==
There are seven secondary schools in the province: Kondiu Rosary, Yauwe Moses, Kerowagi, Muaina, Gumine, Mt Wilhelm and Kundiawa Lutheran Day Secondary School. The province also has many high and primary schools.

== Districts and LLGs ==
The province is subdivided into six districts, with each district further subdivided into 18 rural LLGs and 2 urban LLGs areas. Each of the RLLGs are headed by a President and Urban LLG by a Mayor. Each LLGs have various council wards represented by a councillor who sits in the Council Assembly. All the councillors are democratically elected and Presidents are elected in the Council Assembly. For census purposes, the LLG areas are again subdivided into wards and those into census units.

District	District Capital	LLG Name
Chuave District	Chuave	Chuave Rural
Chuave District	Chuave	Elimbari Rural
Chuave District	Chuave	Siane Rural
Gumine District	Gumine	Bomai-Gumai Rural
Gumine District	Gumine	Gumine Rural
Gumine District	Gumine	Mount Digine Rural
Salt Nomane Karamui District	Kilau	Karimui Rural
Salt Nomane Karamui District	Kilau	Nomane Rural
Salt Nomane Karamui District	Kilau	Salt Rural
Kerowagi District	Kerowagi	Gena-Waugla Rural
Kerowagi District	Kerowagi	Upper-Lower Koronigl Rural
Kerowagi District	Kerowagi	Kerowagi Urban
Kerowagi District	Kerowagi	Kup Rural
Kundiawa-Gembogl District	Kundiawa	Kundiawa Urban
Kundiawa-Gembogl District	Kundiawa	Mitnande Rural (Mount Wilhelm Rural)
Kundiawa-Gembogl District	Kundiawa	Niglkande Rural
Kundiawa-Gembogl District	Kundiawa	Waiye Rural
Sina Sina-Yonggomugl District	Yonggomugl	Tabare Rural (Sinasina)
Sina Sina-Yonggomugl District	Yonggomugl	Suai Rural (Suwai)
Sina Sina-Yonggomugl District	Yonggomugl	Yonggomugl Rural

== Political governance and administration ==
=== Chimbu provincial leaders ===
The province was governed by a decentralised provincial administration, headed by a Premier, from 1977 to 1995. Following reforms taking effect that year, the national government reassumed some powers, and the role of Premier was replaced by a position of Governor, to be held by the winner of the province-wide seat in the National Parliament of Papua New Guinea.

==== Premiers (1976–1995) ====
Premier	Term
Siwi Kurondo	1976–1978
Mathew Siune	1978–1984
provincial government suspended	1984–1986
Peter Gul	1986–1988
David Mai	1988–1992
Edward Bare	1992–1993
Edward Aba	1993–1995

==== Governors (1995–present) ====
Governor	Term
Yauwe Riyong	1995–1997
Louis Ambane	1997–1998
Simeon Wai	1998–1999
Louis Ambane	1999–2003
Alphonse Willie	2003–2004
Peter Launa	2004–2007
John Garia	2007–2012
Noah Kool	2012–2017
Micheal Dua Bogai	2017–2022
Noah Kool	2022–present

=== Members of the National Parliament ===
The province and each district is represented by a Member of the National Parliament. There is one provincial electorate and each district is a local ("Open") electorate.

Electorate	Name
Chimbu Provincial	Noah Kool
Chuave Open	James Nomane
Gumine Open	Dawa Dekena
Salt Nomane Karamui Open	Francis Yori Alua
Kerowagi Open	Francis Kikin Siune
Kundiawa-Gembogl Open	ON HOLD-Suspended
Sinasina-Yonggomugl Open	Kerenga Kua

== See also ==
- Adumo
