= Provinces of Papua New Guinea =

First-level administrative divisions of Papua New Guinea

Provincial-level divisions of Papua New Guinea
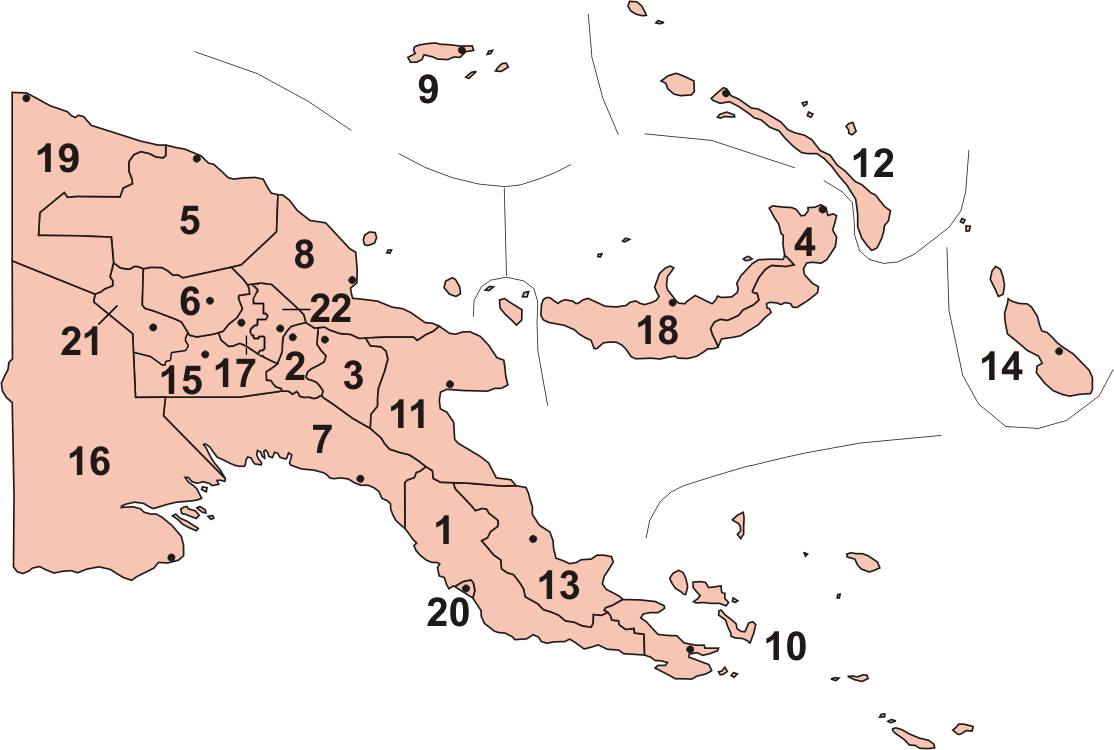
- Category: Unitary state
- Location: Independent State of Papua New Guinea
- Number: 22 provincial-level divisions: 20 provinces 1 Autonomous Region; 1 National Capital District
- Populations: Provinces only: Smallest: 50,231 (Manus); Largest: 674,810 (Morobe)
- Areas: Provinces only: Smallest: 2,100 km^{2} (800 sq mi) (Manus); Largest: 98,190 km^{2} (37,911 sq mi) (Fly River)
- Subdivisions: Districts Local-level government areas (LLG) Wards Census units (or villages)

For administrative purposes, Papua New Guinea is divided into administrative divisions called provinces. There are 22 provincial-level divisions, which include 20 provinces, the Autonomous Region of Bougainville, and the National Capital District of Port Moresby.

In 2009, the National Parliament of Papua New Guinea created two additional provinces, that officially came into being on 17 May 2012. They were Hela Province, which was split from Southern Highlands Province, and Jiwaka Province, which was split from Western Highlands Province.

Each province forms a provincial electorate, called a constituency, for the PNG national parliament. The 22 provincial members are chosen from single-member electorates. Each provincial member becomes governor of their province unless they take a ministerial position, in which case the governorship passes to an open member of the province.

== History ==
Immediately before independence on 16 September 1975, Papua New Guinea was divided into nineteen provinces and the National Capital District. These provinces corresponded to the "Districts" of the pre-Independence administration of the Territory of Papua and New Guinea.

=== The Bougainville issue ===
It had been considered that an independent state with limited resources could ill afford the infrastructure of a two-level quasi-federal governmental structure. However, a secessionist movement in Bougainville, whose copper mine provided the largest single source of foreign exchange and whose contribution to the general revenue was crucial to the independent state's economic viability, forced the issue. The Bougainville secession movement declared the Republic of the North Solomons on 1 September 1975 and the central government very quickly responded by offering provincial status to Bougainville. For the sake of consistency, as there were or had been regional separatist movements in Papua and East New Britain, provincial status was offered to the other 18 Districts as well.

Bougainville continues to be a special case. A renewed secession movement emerged in 1988 and resulted in a violent military campaign on the island, the closing of the Bougainville Copper Mine with serious financial consequences for the central government, the destruction or running-down of most infrastructure on the island and, ultimately, the total quarantining of the province for a decade. The Sandline affair of 1997 was a political scandal that became one of the defining moments in Papua New Guinea's history, particularly that of the conflict in Bougainville.

The Bougainville secessionists came to terms with the central government in 1997. A constitution was drafted for a more autonomous regional polity within Papua New Guinea with its own president and provisions for a referendum on total autonomy in due course.

== Government ==
Until 1995, the provinces had elected provincial assemblies and cabinets led by premiers; however, the country remained unitary, not federal. Unlike Canada, Australia, and the United States, whose federal governments are creatures of the provinces or states, but as with the provinces and states of Pakistan and India, the provinces are creatures of the central government and can be suspended by it or have their boundaries changed. Indeed, there have been suspensions of several provincial governments to address corruption or incompetence by elected provincial governments. Changes in the boundaries of those provinces which are adjacent to the former boundary between the Territories of Papua and New Guinea can cause special complications in the administration of statutes that apply in Papua or New Guinea but not both.

Ultimately in June 1995, in an effort to re-assert a measure of control by the central government over the often wayward provinces in an environment of limited numbers of personnel qualified for public office in many of the provinces, the office of the provincial premier was abolished and the regional (at-large) members of Parliament became provincial governors, while also retaining their seats in Parliament.

== Naming of provinces ==
Several provincial governments have adopted a local name for their province. For example, Bougainville became North Solomons, Western became Fly River, Chimbu became Simbu, Northern became Oro, and West Sepik became Sandaun.

Though these names are accorded popular acceptance, they remain unofficial, as formal changes in province names require amendments to the Constitution, using the prescribed amending formula.

== New provinces ==
In May 2012, two new provinces were established: Hela Province was split from Southern Highlands Province and Jiwaka Province from Western Highlands Province.

== List of provinces ==
For administrative purposes, Papua New Guinea is divided into four regions and also into 22 provinces, as follows (they are numbered according to the map on the top right):

| # (map) | Region | Province | Capital | Governor (as of 2022) | Area (km^{2}) | Population (2011 census) | Density (pop/km^{2}) |
|---|---|---|---|---|---|---|---|
| 1 | Southern | Central | Port Moresby | Rufina Peter | 29,998 | 269,756 | 6.21 |
| 2 | Highlands | Chimbu (Simbu) | Kundiawa | Noah Kool | 6,112 | 376,473 | 42.42 |
| 3 | Highlands | Eastern Highlands | Goroka | Simon Sia | 11,157 | 579,825 | 38.35 |
| 4 | Islands | East New Britain | Kokopo | Michael Marum | 15,274 | 328,369 | 14.20 |
| 5 | Momase | East Sepik | Wewak | Allan Bird | 43,426 | 450,530 | 7.98 |
| 6 | Highlands | Enga | Wabag | Peter Ipatas | 11,704 | 432,045 | 22.60 |
| 7 | Southern | Gulf | Kerema | Chris Haiveta | 34,472 | 158,194 | 3.04 |
| 8 | Momase | Madang | Madang | Ramsey Pariwa | 28,886 | 493,906 | 12.49 |
| 9 | Islands | Manus | Lorengau | Charlie Benjamin | 2,000 | 50,231 | 20.76 |
| 10 | Southern | Milne Bay | Alotau | Gordon Wesley | 14,345 | 276,512 | 14.93 |
| 11 | Momase | Morobe | Lae | Luther Wenge | 33,705 | 674,810 | 15.56 |
| 12 | Islands | New Ireland | Kavieng | Byron Chan | 9,557 | 194,067 | 12.31 |
| 13 | Southern | Oro (Northern) | Popondetta | Gary Juffa | 22,735 | 186,309 | 5.82 |
| 14 | Islands | Bougainville | Buka | Ishmael Toroama (President 2020); Joe Lera | 9,384 | 249,358 | 15.18 |
| 15 | Highlands | Southern Highlands | Mendi | William Powi | 15,089 | 510,245 | 23.86 |
| 16 | Southern | Western (Fly) | Daru | Taboi Awe Yoto | 98,189 | 201,351 | 1.53 |
| 17 | Highlands | Western Highlands | Mount Hagen | Wai Rapa | 4,299 | 362,850 | 59.12 |
| 18 | Islands | West New Britain | Kimbe | Sasindran Muthuvel | 20,387 | 264,264 | 8.80 |
| 19 | Momase | Sandaun (West Sepik) | Vanimo | Tony Wouwou | 35,820 | 248,411 | 5.12 |
| 20 | Southern | National Capital District | Port Moresby | Powes Parkop | 240 | 364,125 | 1051.95 |
| 21 | Highlands | Hela | Tari | Philip Undialu | 10,498 | 249,449 | 17.71 |
| 22 | Highlands | Jiwaka | Kurumul | Simon Kaiwi | 4,798 | 343,987 | 38.68 |

== Regions ==
On a broader scale, PNG is divided into four regions. The regions are significant in daily life and are often the basis for the organisation of government services, corporate operations, sporting competitions, and even the machinations of politics. For instance, there has been much discussion over the years of how many Prime Ministers have come from each region, and whether a particular region is due to provide the next one. Ministers and departmental heads are often appointed to maintain an overall balance between the regions.

People generally identify quite strongly with their region, and inter-region rivalries can be intense. The four regions are:

- Highlands Region: Chimbu, Eastern Highlands, Enga, Hela, Jiwaka, Southern Highlands, and Western Highlands.
- Islands Region: Bougainville (North Solomons), East New Britain, Manus, New Ireland, and West New Britain.
- Momase Region: East Sepik, Madang, Morobe, and Sandaun (West Sepik).
- Southern Region: Central, Gulf, Milne Bay, Northern Province (Oro), Western (Fly), and the National Capital District.

Momase is a recently devised word which combines the first two letters of Morobe, Madang, and Sepik.

== See also ==
- ISO 3166-2:PG
- List of provinces of Papua New Guinea by Human Development Index
- Regions of Papua New Guinea
- Districts of Papua New Guinea
- Local-level governments of Papua New Guinea
- List of cities and towns in Papua New Guinea
- List of cities and towns in Papua New Guinea by population
