= UTC+10:00 =

Identifier for a time offset from UTC of +10

- Time zone
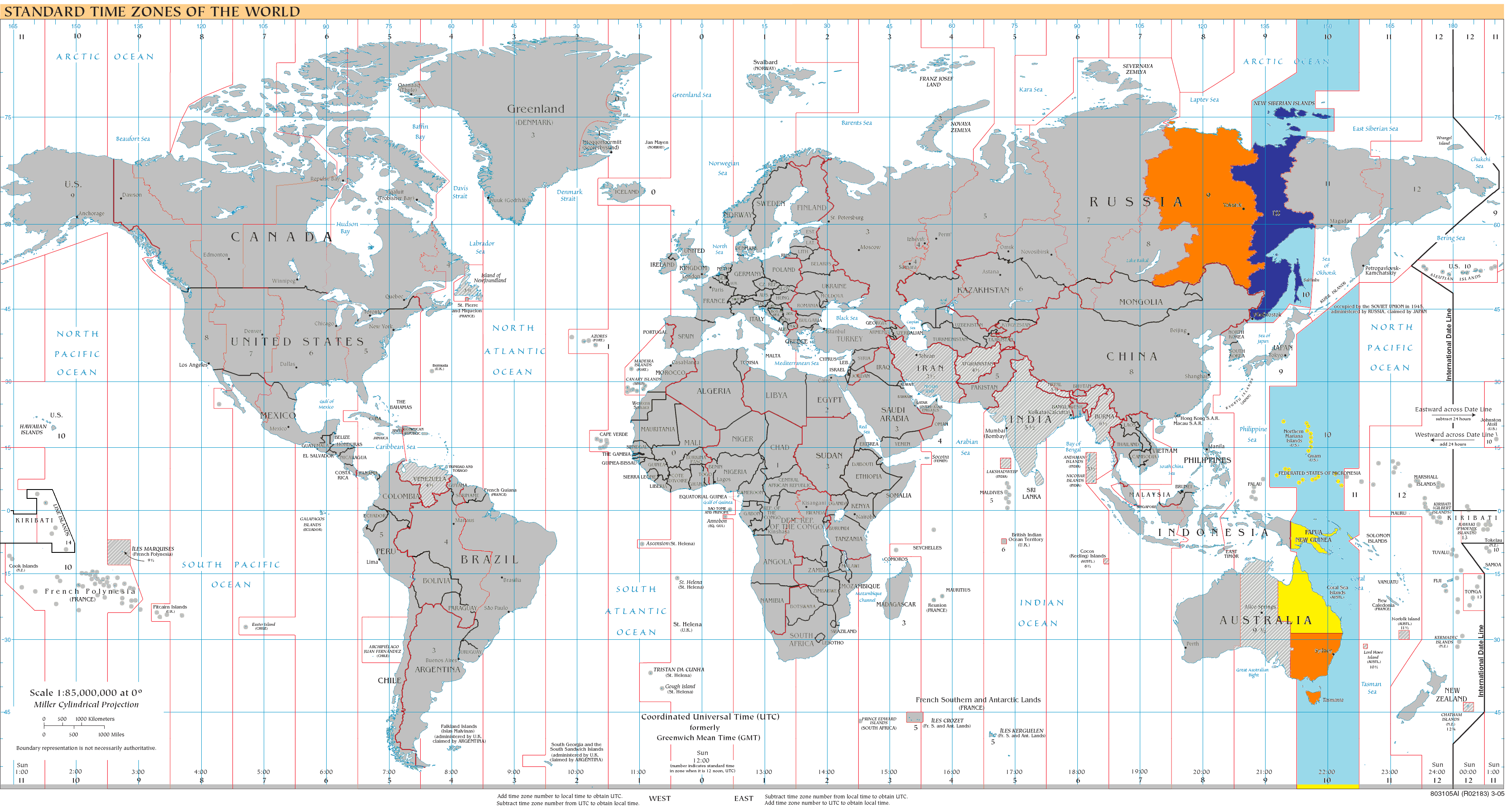
- World map with the time zone highlighted

UTC offset
- UTC: UTC+10:00

Current time
- :: UTC+10:00 [refresh]

Central meridian
- 150 degrees E

Date-time group
- K

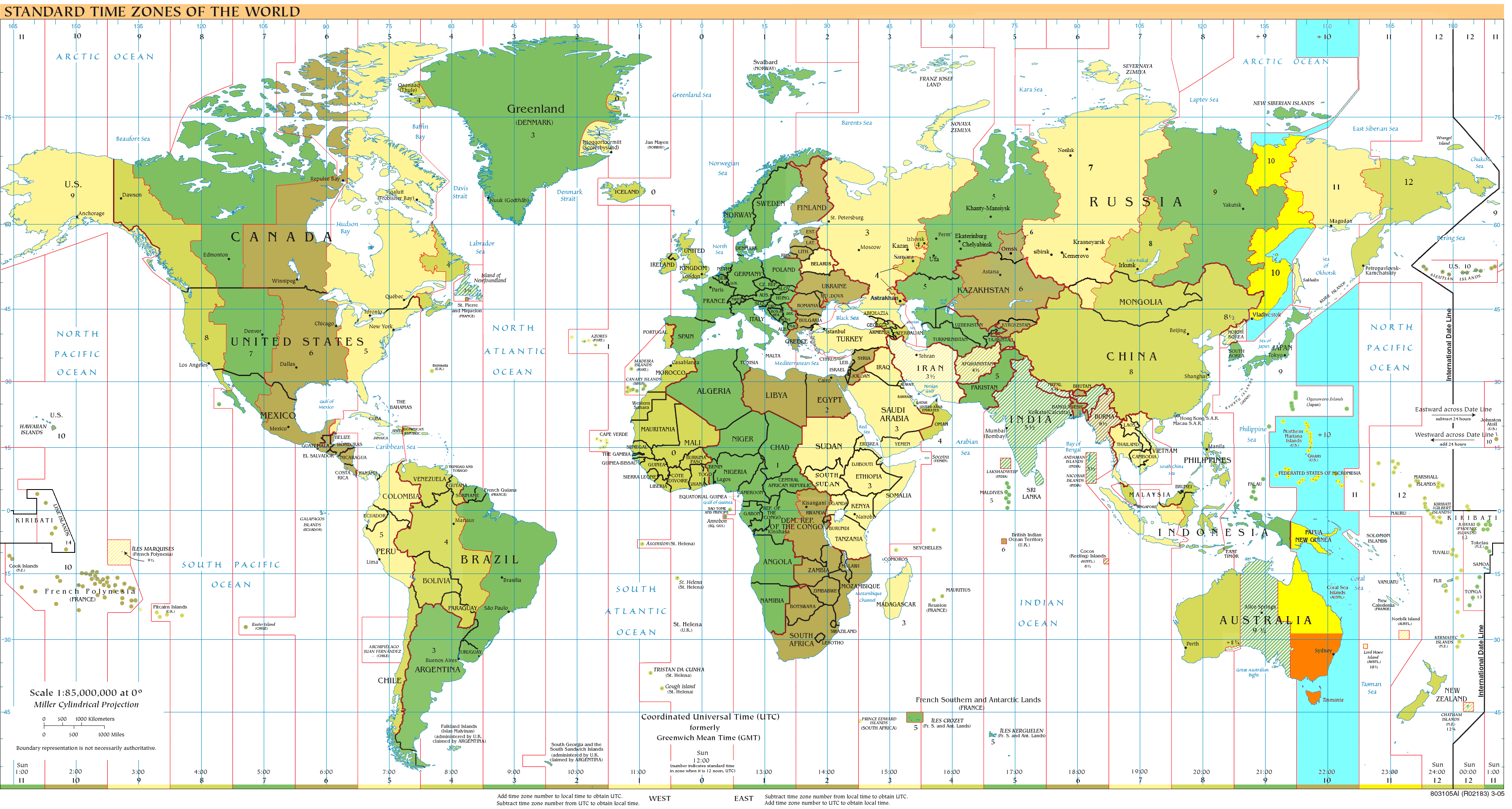
UTC+10:00: blue (December), orange (June), yellow (year-round), light blue (sea areas)

Time in Russia: KALT / Kaliningrad Time / UTC+2 / (MSK−1); MSK / Moscow Time / UTC+3 / (MSK±0); SAMT / Samara Time / UTC+4 / (MSK+1); YEKT / Yekaterinburg Time / UTC+5 / (MSK+2); OMST / Omsk Time / UTC+6 / (MSK+3); KRAT / Krasnoyarsk Time / UTC+7 / (MSK+4); IRKT / Irkutsk Time / UTC+8 / (MSK+5); YAKT / Yakutsk Time / UTC+9 / (MSK+6); VLAT / Vladivostok Time / UTC+10 / (MSK+7); MAGT / Magadan Time / UTC+11 / (MSK+8); PETT / Kamchatka Time / UTC+12 / (MSK+9)

Time in Australia: Standard / DST / Zone; UTC+08:00 (year round) / / Western Time; UTC+09:30 (year round) / / Central Time; UTC+09:30 / UTC+10:30 / Central Time; UTC+10:00 (year round) / / Eastern Time; UTC+10:00 / UTC+11:00 / Eastern Time; UTC+10:30 / UTC+11:00 / Lord Howe Island

UTC+10:00 is an identifier for a time offset from UTC of +10:00. This time is used in:

== As standard time (year-round) ==
Principal cities: Vladivostok, Khabarovsk, Saipan, Dededo, Port Moresby, Brisbane, Gold Coast

=== North Asia ===
- Russia – Vladivostok Time
  - Far Eastern Federal District
    - Jewish Autonomous Oblast, Khabarovsk Krai, Primorsky Krai, Sakha Republic, Oymyakonsky, Ust-Yansky, Verkhoyansky and districts of the Sakha Republic (central part; east of 140 degrees longitude and including the Abyysky, Allaikhovsky, Momsky, Nizhnekolymsky, and Srednekolymsky districts)

=== Oceania ===
==== Micronesia ====
- Federated States of Micronesia
  - Chuuk
  - Yap
- United States - Chamorro Time Zone -- this is the only U.S. time zone with a plus (ahead of London)
  - Guam
  - Northern Mariana Islands

==== Melanesia ====
- Papua New Guinea
  - All of the country except Autonomous Region of Bougainville
    - Highlands Region
      - Chimbu
      - Eastern Highlands
      - Enga
      - Hela
      - Jiwaka
      - Southern Highlands
      - Western Highlands
    - Islands Region
      - East New Britain
      - Manus
      - New Ireland
      - West New Britain
    - Momase Region
      - East Sepik
      - Madang
      - Morobe
      - Sandaun (West Sepik)
    - Southern Region
      - Central
      - Gulf
      - Milne Bay
      - Oro (Northern)
      - Western

==== Australia ====
- Australia – Eastern Standard Time (AEST)
  - Queensland

=== Antarctica ===
==== Southern Ocean ====
- Some bases in Antarctica. See also Time in Antarctica.
- Australia
  - Australian Antarctic Territory
    - Macquarie Island
- France
  - French Southern and Antarctic Lands
    - Adélie Land
      - Dumont d'Urville Station

== As standard time (Southern Hemisphere winter) ==
Principal cities: Canberra, Sydney, Melbourne, Hobart

=== Oceania ===
- Australia – Eastern Standard Time (AEST)
  - Australian Capital Territory
  - Jervis Bay Territory
  - New South Wales (except Broken Hill and its surrounds, as well as Lord Howe Island)
  - Tasmania
  - Victoria

== Discrepancies between official UTC+10:00 and geographical UTC+10:00 ==
=== Areas in UTC+10:00 longitudes using other time zones ===
Using UTC+09:00:

- Japan
  - The eastern parts of Hokkaido, including Obihiro, Kushiro, and Nemuro
  - Minami-Tori-shima in Ogasawara municipality
- Russia
  - New Siberian Islands
    - Novaya Sibir
    - Faddeyevsky Island
    - A small part of Kotelny Island
    - The eastern part of Great Lyakhovsky Island

Using UTC+11:00:

- Russia
  - Sakhalin Oblast (eastern part of Sakhalin Island and Russian territory of Kuril Islands)
  - The most part of Magadan Oblast
  - Sakha Republic (eastern part; Oymyakonsky, Ust-Yansky, and Verkhoyansky districts)
- Micronesia
  - The western part of Pohnpei
- Papua New Guinea
  - Autonomous Region of Bougainville, except island in very east
- Solomon Islands
  - Shortland Islands
  - Choiseul, with an exception in very east
  - The western part of New Georgia Islands

=== Areas outside UTC+10:00 longitudes using UTC+10:00 time ===
==== Areas between 127°30′ E and 142°30′ E ("physical" UTC+09:00) ====
- Russia
  - Central part of Sakha Republic
  - Most of Khabarovsk Krai
  - Jewish Autonomous Oblast
  - Primorsky Krai
- Papua New Guinea
  - The very westernmost parts in the country
- Australia
  - The western parts of Queensland
  - The westernmost parts of New South Wales and Victoria, except Broken Hill (standard time)
