= East New Guinea Highlands languages =

Family of languages in Papua New Guinea

East New Guinea Highlands
- (obsolete)
- Geographic distribution: Papua New Guinea
- Linguistic classification: Proposed language family

Language codes
- Glottolog: None

East New Guinea Highlands is a 1960 proposal by Stephen Wurm for a family of Papuan languages spoken in Papua New Guinea that formed part of his 1975 expansion of Trans–New Guinea.

== History of classification ==
The original proposal consisted of West-Central (Engan), Central (Chimbu–Wahgi), East-Central (Goroka), and Eastern (Kainantu). Duna and Kalam were added in 1971. East New Guinea Highlands was broken up by Malcolm Ross in his 2005 classification (see below), but all branches were retained, and all remain within the now expanded Trans–New Guinea. This language grouping should not be confused with the East Papuan languages, a separate hypothesis.

== Family division ==
- **Wiru** isolate
- **Kenati** isolate
- **Duna–Pogaya** family
- **Kalam** family: Gants, Kalam-Kobon, Tai
- **Eastern (Kainantu)** family
  - Oweina language
  - Kambaira language
  - Tairora branch: Binumarien, South Tairoa, North Tairoa, Waffa
  - Gapsup branch: Agarabi, Awiyaana, Awa, Gadsup, Kosena, Ontenu, Usarufa
- **Central (Chimbu–Wahgi)** family
  - Chimbu branch: Chuave, Dom, Golin, Kuman, Nomane, Salt-Yui, Sinasina
  - Hagen branch
    - Melpa (Medlpa) language
    - Kaugel languages: Imbongu, Mbo-Ung, Umbu-Ungu
  - Jimi branch: Maring, Narak, Kandawo
  - Wahgi branch: Nii, Wahgi, North Wahgi
- **East-Central (Goroka)** family
  - Gende language
  - Fore branch: Fore, Gimi
  - Gahuku branch: Dano (Upper Asaro), Benabena, Alekano (Gahuku), Tokano (Lower Asaro)
  - Siane branch: Siane, Yaweyuha
  - Kamono-Yagaria branch: Kamono, Inoke-Yate, Kanite, Keyagana, Yagaria
- **West-Central (Engan)** family
  - Huli language
  - Enga proper: Enga, Nete, Ipili, Lembena, Bisorio
  - Angal-Kewa branch: Kyaka, Angal, Angal Heneng (Katinja), Angal Enen, Samberigi (Sau), West Kewa, East Kewa, Erave

Ross classified each of the families in bold as a separate branch of TNG, with the exceptions of Kainantu and Goroka, which he kept together; Kalam, which he linked to the Rai Coast family; and Kenati, which he had insufficient data to classify but which has since been associated with Kainantu.

Ross believes that these languages lie near the homeland of proto–Trans New Guinea.

== See also ==
- Trans–New Guinea languages
