= Asaro =

Asaro may refer to:

- Asaro (food), a traditional yam dish of the Yoruba people of Nigeria and Benin
- Asaro'o language, a Finisterre language in Madang Province
- Asaro River, Eastern Highlands province
- Asaro Mudmen, a costume tradition involving mud masks in Goroka, Eastern Highlands province
- Dano language (Upper Asaro)
- Lower Asaro Rural LLG
- Upper Asaro Rural LLG

== People with the surname ==
- Catherine Asaro (born 1955), science fiction/fantasy author and physicist
- Frank Asaro (1927–2014), nuclear chemist

== See also ==
- 4531 Asaro, a minor planet
