= Kenati =

Kenati may refer to:

- Kenati language, an East New Guinea Highlands language
- Kenati Technologies, an embedded device software company acquired by 2Wire in October 2007
- Mohammed-Benba-Kenâti, a notable leader of the Soninke Wangara clans in Mali
