= AUY =

AUY or auy may refer to:

- AUY, the IATA code for Anatom Airport, Taféa, Vanuatu
- auy, the ISO 639-3 code for Awiyaana language, Papua New Guinea
