= YBY =

YBY or yby may refer to:

- YBY, the IATA code for Bonnyville Airport, Alberta, Canada
- yby, the ISO 639-3 code for Yaweyuha language, Papua New Guinea
