= Nu and the Hua People =

Nu is a central idea in the culture of the Hua people (see Yagaria language) of Papua New Guinea. There is a relationship or connection between food, consumer, and a source. According to their beliefs, all food contains the Nu of its creator or producer, with the exception of wild plants and vegetation. "In Hua thinking, Nu is a highly volatile and nonstatic substance that is always in motion. Nu is passed directly from person to person not only through intentional acts but also through unintentional acts. Furthermore, all food transactions involve transfers and exchanges of Nu (Meigs, 1997 p. 99). Nu is contained within bodily fluids, bodily substances, and any bodily product. It can take a positive or negative effect on the people surrounding it, leading to exceptional growth and health, or contributing to a lack of growth and health. Social relationships are also influenced by the substance of Nu.

== Sources ==
- Meigs, Anna. Food as a Cultural Construction. Food and Culture: A Reader. Ed. Carole Counihan and Penny van Esterik. New York: Routledge, 1997. 95–106.
- Meigs, Anna. Food, Sex, and Pollution: A New Guinea Religion (Rutgers University Press; Reprint edition, April 1988) ISBN 0-8135-1306-5
