= Alekano language =

Papuan language of Papua New Guinea

Alekano
- Gahuku
- Native to: Papua New Guinea
- Region: Gahuku Rural LLG, Goroka District, Eastern Highlands Province
- Native speakers: 40,000 (2008)
- Language family: Trans–New Guinea: Kainantu–Goroka; Goroka; Gahuku; Alekano
- Writing system: Latin

Language codes
- ISO 639-3: gah
- Glottolog: alek1238
- ELP: Alekano

Alekano, or Gahuku (Gahuku-Gama), is a Papuan language spoken in Gahuku Rural LLG of Eastern Highlands Province, Papua New Guinea. There are about 25,000 speakers.

Alekano is also known as Gahuku, after the name of the largest clan of speakers, or Gama, after the second largest clan. Calling the language by these names has been rejected by speakers who are not members of these clans. Alekano was proposed as a suitable new name by the linguist Rev Dr Ellis Deibler, and it might be considered the official name by linguists. The name is almost unknown to speakers of the Gahuku and Gama clans. "Alekano" means "bring it". In two closely related languages spoken directly to the northwest, Tokano and Dano, it has the same meaning.

== Phonology ==
Alekano has 5 vowels, all unrounded, which is exceptional. It has 12 consonants, but /w/ is found only in the village Wanima, in derivations or in pidgin loanwords.

=== Vowels ===
	Front	Back
High	i	ɯ
Mid	e	ɤ
Low		ɑ

=== Glottal coda ===
In Alekano, a syllable may be closed only with a glottal stop, as in /ɑʔnesiʔ/ "enough". That is currently not treated as a consonant, but it is unclear if words written as vowel initial begin with a glottal stop. It is written as an acute accent in the orthography, for example, ánesí.

=== Consonants ===
		Bilabial	Alveolar	Velar	Glottal
Nasal		m	n		
Plosive		p	t	k	
Approximant		β	l~ɽ	ɣ	h
Sibilant	voiceless		s		
Sibilant	voiced		z		

The lateral is [l] initially and [ɽ] between vowels.

=== Syllables ===
The most complex syllables are of the form /CVVʔ/: VV may be a diphthong of /ɑ/, /e/, or /ɤ/ followed by /i/ or /ɯ/, or of /iɯ/. Other vowels may also occur in sequence (hiatus).

=== Tone ===
Alekano has low and high tones but with a very low functional load. HL receives strong stress, LH lesser stress.

== Grammar ==
Alekano is a subject–object–verb (SOV) language.

== Orthography ==
Alekano uses the Latin script.

IPA	ɑ	e	ɣ	h	i	k	l	m	n	ɤ	p	s	z	t	ɯ	β
Letter	Aa	Ee	Gg	Hh	Ii	Kk	Ll	Mm	Nn	Oo	Pp	Ss	Zz	Tt	Uu	Vv
