= Inoke =

Inoke is a masculine given name. Notable people with the name include:

- Inoke Afeaki (born 1973), Tongan rugby union player
- Inoke Breckterfield (born 1977), American football player and coach
- Inoke Kubuabola (born 1948), Fijian politician
- Inoke Takiveikata (born 1947), Fijian chief and politician

== See also ==
- Inoke language, a Papuan language
