= Noun =

Part of speech that names an object or set of objects

In grammar, a noun is a word that denotes a concrete or abstract entity, like living creatures, places, actions, events, qualities, states of existence, and ideas. To summarize this, nouns signify an object or idea. A noun may serve as an object or subject within a phrase, clause, or sentence. (Note: Example nouns for: Living creatures (including people, alive, dead, or imaginary): mushrooms, dogs, Afro-Caribbeans, rosebushes, Mandela, bacteria, Klingons, etc.; Physical objects: hammers, pencils, Earth, guitars, atoms, stones, boots, shadows, etc.; Places: closets, temples, rivers, Antarctica, houses, Uluru, utopia, etc.; Actions of individuals or groups: swimming, exercises, cough, explosions, flight, electrification, embezzlement, etc.; Physical qualities: colors, lengths, porosity, weights, roundness, symmetry, solidity, etc.; Mental or bodily states: jealousy, sleep, joy, headache, confusion, etc.)

In linguistics, nouns constitute a lexical category (part of speech) defined according to how its members combine with members of other lexical categories. The syntactic occurrence of nouns differs among languages.

In English, prototypical nouns are common nouns or proper nouns that can occur with determiners, articles and attributive adjectives, and can function as the head of a noun phrase. According to traditional and popular classification, pronouns are distinct from nouns, but in much modern theory they are considered a subclass of nouns. Every language has various linguistic and grammatical distinctions between nouns and verbs.

== History ==
Word classes (parts of speech) were described by Sanskrit grammarians from at least the 5th century BC. In Yāska's Nirukta, the noun (nāma) is one of the four main categories of words defined.

The Ancient Greek equivalent was ónoma (ὄνομα), referred to by Plato in the Cratylus, and later listed as one of the eight parts of speech in The Art of Grammar, attributed to Dionysius Thrax (2nd century BC). The term used in Latin grammar was nōmen. All of these terms for "noun" were also words meaning "name". The English word noun is derived from the Latin term, through the Anglo-Norman nom (other forms include nomme, and noun itself).

The word classes were defined partly by the grammatical forms that they take. In Sanskrit, Greek, and Latin, for example, nouns are categorized by gender and inflected for case and number. Because adjectives share these three grammatical categories, adjectives typically were placed in the same class as nouns.

Similarly, the Latin term nōmen includes both nouns (substantives) and adjectives, as originally did the English word noun, the two types being distinguished as nouns substantive and nouns adjective (or substantive nouns and adjective nouns, or simply substantives and adjectives). (The word nominal is now sometimes used to denote a class that includes both nouns and adjectives.)

Many European languages use a cognate of the word substantive as the basic term for noun (for example, Spanish sustantivo, "noun"). Nouns in the dictionaries of such languages are demarked by the abbreviation s. or sb. instead of n., which may be used for proper nouns or neuter nouns instead. In English, some modern authors use the word substantive to refer to a class that includes both nouns (single words) and noun phrases (multiword units that are sometimes called noun equivalents). It can also be used as a counterpart to attributive when distinguishing between a noun being used as the head (main word) of a noun phrase and a noun being used as a noun adjunct. For example, the noun knee can be said to be used substantively in my knee hurts, but attributively in the patient needed knee replacement.

== Examples ==
- The cat sat on the chair.
- Please hand in your assignments by the end of the week.
- Cleanliness is next to godliness.
- Plato was an influential philosopher in ancient Greece.
- Revel the night, rob, murder, and commit / The oldest sins the newest kind of ways? Henry IV Part 2, act 4 scene 5.
- There was too much fear holding him back from taking risks.

A noun can co-occur with an article or an attributive adjective. Verbs and adjectives cannot. In the following, an asterisk (*) in front of an example means that this example is ungrammatical.

- the name (name is a noun: can co-occur with a definite article the)
- *the baptise (baptise is a verb: cannot co-occur with a definite article)
- constant circulation (circulation is a noun: can co-occur with the attributive adjective constant)
- *constant circulate (circulate is a verb: cannot co-occur with the attributive adjective constant)
- a fright (fright is a noun: can co-occur with the indefinite article a)
- *an afraid (afraid is an adjective: cannot co-occur with the article a)
- terrible fright (the noun fright can co-occur with the adjective terrible)
- *terrible afraid (the adjective afraid cannot co-occur with the adjective terrible)

== Characterization and definition ==
Nouns have sometimes been characterized in terms of the grammatical categories by which they may be varied (for example gender, case, and number). Such definitions tend to be language-specific, since different languages may apply different categories.

Nouns are frequently defined, particularly in informal contexts, in terms of their semantic properties (their meanings). Nouns are described as words that refer to a person, place, thing, event, substance, quality, quantity, etc., but this manner of definition has been criticized as uninformative.

Several English nouns lack an intrinsic referent of their own: behalf (as in on behalf of), dint (by dint of), and sake (for the sake of). Moreover, other parts of speech may have reference-like properties: the verbs to rain or to mother, or adjectives like red; and there is little difference between the adverb gleefully and the prepositional phrase with glee. (Note: Idioms often include nouns in a way that may be independent of any nominal meaning they may have: in rock and roll there is no reference to any "rock" or any "roll"; lock, stock, and barrel is a dead metaphor that refers only to a figurative sense of a lock or stock or barrel. See hendiadys and hendiatris.)

A functional approach defines a noun as a word that can be the head of a nominal phrase, i.e., a phrase with referential function, without needing to go through morphological transformation.

== Classification ==
Nouns can have a number of different properties and are often sub-categorized based on various of these criteria, depending on their occurrence in a language. Nouns may be classified according to morphological properties such as which prefixes or suffixes they take, and also their relations in syntax – how they combine with other words and expressions of various types.

Many such classifications are language-specific, given the obvious differences in syntax and morphology. In English for example, it might be noted that nouns are words that can co-occur with definite articles (as stated at the start of this article), but this could not apply in Russian, which has no definite articles.

=== Gender ===
In some languages common and proper nouns have grammatical gender, typically masculine, feminine, and neuter. The gender of a noun (as well as its number and case, where applicable) will often require agreement in words that modify or are used along with it. In French for example, the singular form of the definite article is le for masculine nouns and la for feminine; adjectives and certain verb forms also change (sometimes with the simple addition of -e for feminine). Grammatical gender often correlates with the form of the noun and the inflection pattern it follows; for example, in both Italian and Romanian most nouns ending in -a are feminine. Gender can also correlate with the sex or social gender of the noun's referent, particularly in the case of nouns denoting people (and sometimes animals), though with exceptions (the feminine French noun personne can refer to a male or a female person).

In Modern English, even common nouns like hen and princess and proper nouns like Alicia do not have grammatical gender (their femininity has no relevance in syntax), though they denote persons or animals of a specific sex. The gender of a pronoun must be appropriate for the item referred to: "The girl said the ring was from her new boyfriend, but he denied it was from him" (three nouns; and three gendered pronouns: or four, if this her is counted as a possessive pronoun).

=== Proper and common nouns ===
A proper noun (sometimes called a proper name, though the two terms normally have different meanings) is a noun that represents a unique entity (India, Pegasus, Jupiter, Confucius, Pequod) – as distinguished from common nouns (or appellative nouns), which describe a class of entities (country, animal, planet, person, ship). In Modern English, most proper nouns – unlike most common nouns – are capitalized regardless of context (Albania, Newton, Pasteur, America), as are many of the forms that are derived from them (the common noun in "he's an Albanian"; the adjectival forms in "he's of Albanian heritage" and "Newtonian physics", but not in "pasteurized milk"; the second verb in "they sought to Americanize us").

=== Countable nouns and mass nouns ===
Count nouns or countable nouns are common nouns that can take a plural, can combine with numerals or counting quantifiers (e.g., one, two, several, every, most), and can take an indefinite article such as a or an (in languages that have such articles). Examples of count nouns are chair, nose, and occasion.

Mass nouns or uncountable (non-count) nouns differ from count nouns in precisely that respect: they cannot take plurals or combine with number words or the above type of quantifiers. For example, the forms a furniture and three furnitures are not used – even though pieces of furniture can be counted. The distinction between mass and count nouns does not primarily concern their corresponding referents but more how the nouns present those entities.

Many nouns have both countable and uncountable uses; for example, soda is countable in "give me three sodas", but uncountable in "he likes soda".

=== Collective nouns ===
Collective nouns are nouns that – even when they are treated in their morphology and syntax as singular – refer to groups consisting of more than one individual or entity. Examples include committee, government, and police. In English these nouns may be followed by a singular or a plural verb and referred to by a singular or plural pronoun, the singular being generally preferred when referring to the body as a unit and the plural often being preferred, especially in British English, when emphasizing the individual members. Examples of acceptable and unacceptable use given by Gowers in Plain Words include:

"A committee was appointed to consider this subject." (singular)
"The committee were unable to agree." (plural)
* "The committee were of one mind when I sat in on them." (unacceptable use of plural)

=== Concrete nouns and abstract nouns ===
Concrete nouns refer to physical entities that can, in principle at least, be observed by at least one of the senses (chair, apple, Janet, atom), as items supposed to exist in the physical world. Abstract nouns, on the other hand, refer to abstract objects: ideas or concepts (justice, anger, solubility, duration).

Some nouns have both concrete and abstract meanings: art usually refers to something abstract ("Art is important in human culture"), but it can also refer to a concrete item ("I put my daughter's art up on the fridge"). A noun might have a literal (concrete) and also a figurative (abstract) meaning: "a brass key" and "the key to success"; "a block in the pipe" and "a mental block". Similarly, some abstract nouns have developed etymologically by figurative extension from literal roots (drawback, fraction, holdout, uptake).

Many abstract nouns in English are formed by adding a suffix (-ness, -ity, -ion) to adjectives or verbs (happiness and serenity from the adjectives happy and serene; circulation from the verb circulate).

=== Alienable vs. inalienable nouns ===
Illustrating the wide range of possible classifying principles for nouns, the Awa language of Papua New Guinea regiments nouns according to how ownership is assigned: as alienable possession or inalienable possession. An alienably possessed item (a tree, for example) can exist even without a possessor. But inalienably possessed items are necessarily associated with their possessor and are referred to differently, for example with nouns that function as kin terms (meaning "father", etc.), body-part nouns (meaning "shadow", "hair", etc.), or part–whole nouns (meaning "top", "bottom", etc.).

== Noun phrases ==
A noun phrase (or NP) is a phrase usually headed by a common noun, a proper noun, or a pronoun. The head may be the only constituent, or it may be modified by determiners and adjectives. For example, "The dog sat near Ms Curtis and wagged its tail" contains three NPs: the dog (subject of the verbs sat and wagged); Ms Curtis (complement of the preposition near); and its tail (object of wagged). "You became their teacher" contains two NPs: you (subject of became); and their teacher. (Note: In this position their teacher would be analysed variously under different linguistic theories. For example, some would classify it as a "predicate nominal over the subject" (as in the article Predicative expression); but all would agree that it is not an object since became is not transitive. Traditionally, and very commonly in mainstream linguistic analysis, it is classified as a complement or predicative complement (PC); see extended treatment in Chapter 4 ("The clause: complements") of Huddleston and Pullum (2002), pp. 213–321: for example in §5.1 at p. 253, where the NP a minister is taken as a PC in "Ed became a minister" contrasting with its role as an object (O) in "Ed attacked a minister".)

== Nouns in relation to other word classes ==
=== Pronouns ===
Nouns and noun phrases can typically be replaced by pronouns, such as he, it, she, they, which, these, and those, to avoid repetition or explicit identification, or for other reasons (but as noted earlier, current theory often classifies pronouns as a subclass of nouns parallel to prototypical nouns). For example, in the sentence "Gareth thought she was weird", the word she is a pronoun that refers to a person just as the noun Gareth does. The word one can replace parts of noun phrases, and it sometimes stands in for a noun. An example is given below:

John's car is newer than the one that Bill has.

But one can also stand in for larger parts of a noun phrase. For example, in the following example, one can stand in for new car.

This new car is cheaper than that one.

=== Nominalization ===
Nominalization is a process whereby a word that belongs to another part of speech comes to be used as a noun. This can be a way to create new nouns, or to use other words in ways that resemble nouns. In French and Spanish, for example, adjectives frequently act as nouns referring to people who have the characteristics denoted by the adjective. This sometimes happens in English as well, as in the following examples:

This legislation will have the most impact on the poor.
The race is not to the swift, nor the battle to the powerful.
The Socialist International is a worldwide association of political parties.

== See also ==
- Description
- Grammatical case
- Phi features
- Punctuation
- Reference
