= Asaro River =

River in Papua New Guinea

Asaro River is a river in Eastern Highlands province, Papua New Guinea. Along its lower reaches it is part of the boundary with Chimbu Province. At 6°21′31″S 145°11′41″E it joins with the Wahgi River to form the Tua River, which in turn is a tributary of the Purari River.

== See also ==
- Asaro Mudmen
- Lower Asaro Rural LLG
- Upper Asaro Rural LLG
- Asaro River languages
