= KZE =

KZE or kze may refer to:

- KZE, the Indian Railways station code for Kanhangad railway station, Kerala, India
- kze, the ISO 639-3 code for Kosena language, Papua New Guinea
