= Asaro Mudmen =

Tradition of an ethnic group of Papua New Guinea

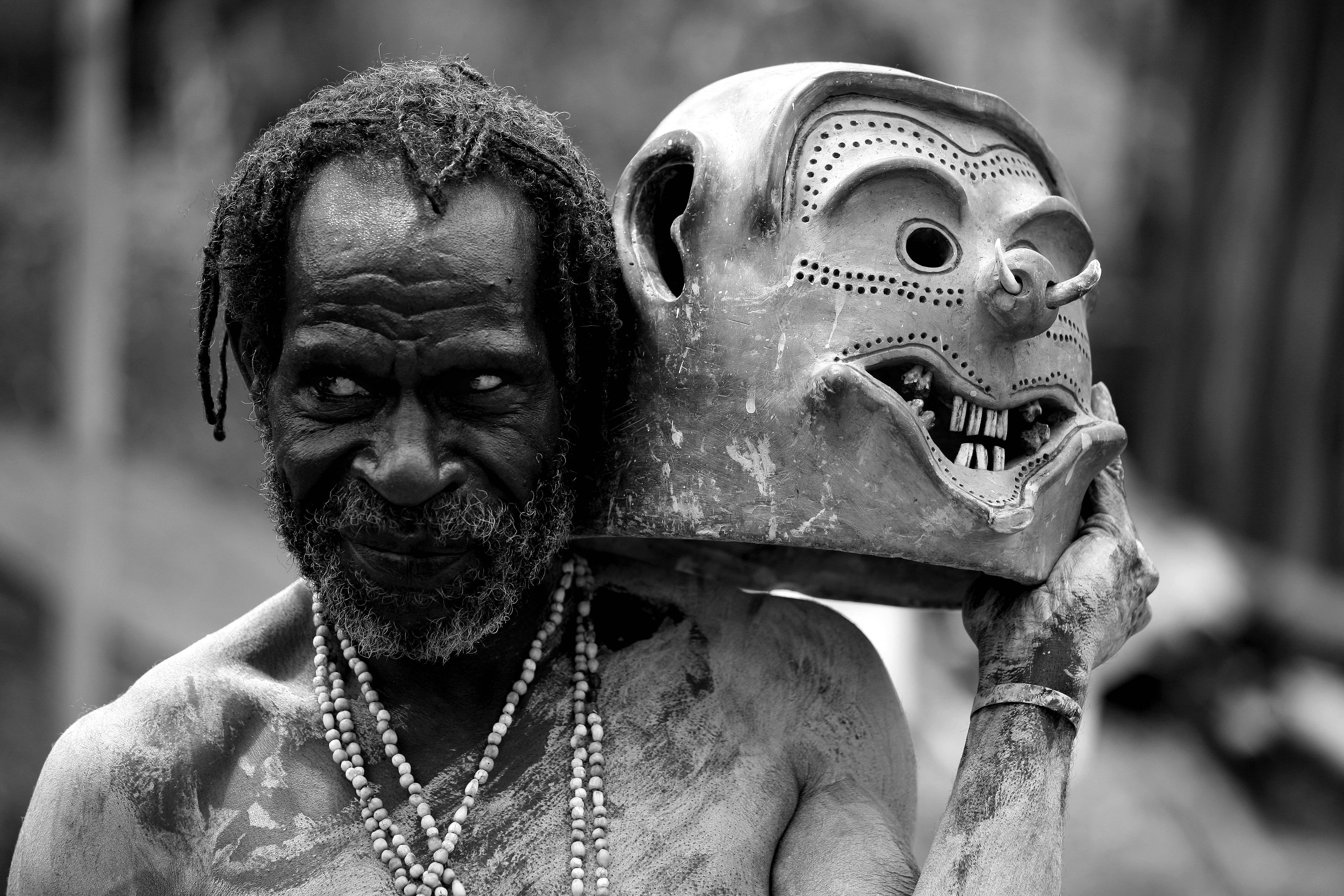
Asaro mudman holding mask, in Kabiufa

The "Mudmen" of Papua New Guinea's Asaro tribe, also known as the Holosa, are those who wear a traditional costume centered around masks made of mud. They reside in a village near Goroka in the Eastern Highlands Province of Papua New Guinea. The practice of wearing these costumes originated for a cultural show in 1957, and has subsequently developed to become an important marker of identity associated both with the local area and the country as a whole. The costumes and associated performances have become significant tourist attractions, leading to imitations in other parts of the highlands.

== Origin ==
According to research conducted in September 1996 by Danish anthropologist Ton Otto from Aarhus University, the Mudmen tradition emerged from the village of Komunive (Note: The village has also been referred to as Asaro village, Kiminivi, Komiufa, Komonibi, and Komuniva, which may be alternative names or incorrect ones.) in the Asaro Valley of the Eastern Highlands Province. Sometime in the late 19th century, a man from the village named Bukiro Pote supposedly travelled to the nearby Watabung area, where he learnt of the practice known as bakime of using white sap to obscure one's features during an attack. Bukiro Pote extended this into girituwai, in which mud was used to cover a frame that rests on the head. Holes were put into the mud for vision. This could be used for disguise during assassinations, although it was not the formal dress suitable for warfare. The practice was adopted by others in the village. It was reportedly revived by Ruipo Okoroho, grandson of Bukiro Pote, for the 1957 Eastern Highlands Agricultural Show. Ruipo Okoroho was asked to showcase a cultural practice of his village, and sought community agreement to develop girituwai instead of using the traditional formal wear of the village. It was likely for this fair that the masks became more elaborate works of art rather than simply being functional, and that the body was painted white to match the mask. The 200 mask-wearers who attended the fair won first prize in the tribal finery contest. It is likely that legends of the fear evoked by the mudmen masks come from this and subsequent fairs, rather than any older tradition. The masks were named holosa by another tribe, meaning "ghost" in the local language, a name adopted by the Asaro. A dance was created to match the masks, evoking the idea that the wearer's bones were broken and that the movements were to swat away flies attracted to rotting flesh.

The origin of the girituwai idea may be part of a wider tradition. Similar practices of obscuring the body with mud or other substances exist in other areas of the highlands, both for warfare and to express grief. The name "mudmen" came from outside tourists attending these fairs. Beginning in 1964, dedicated tourism to Komunive began. In July 1969 a photo of a mudman was included in National Geographic, and in 1970 some mudmen were photographed by Irving Penn. The current elaborate form of the Mudmen tradition, including the mythical backstories, dance, and modern design, likely developed as tourism grew.

=== Creation legends ===
There are various oral histories regarding the origins of the Asaro Mudmen, with anthropologist Todd Otto observing that "there are as many versions of [the creation legend] as there are sources."

According to one account, the Asaro tribe was defeated by an enemy tribe and sought refuge in the Asaro River. There, they encountered a man who granted them the ability to kill with their eyes. They waited until dusk to escape, but one of them was captured. When the captured member emerged from the muddy banks covered in mud, the enemy mistook him for a spirit and fled in fear, as many tribes in Papua New Guinea are fearful of spirits. Believing they had encountered a supernatural force, the enemy tribesmen fled back to their village and performed a special ceremony to ward off the spirits. The mudmen were unable to conceal their faces because it was believed that the mud from the Asaro River was poisonous. Instead, they crafted masks from heated pebbles and water from the waterfall.

Another version suggests that the tradition originated when a wedding guest could not find a traditional wedding costume, and instead "took an old bilum (a string bag), cut two holes for his eyes, dipped it mud and also covered his skin with mud". According to this story, other guests fled believing the wearer was a ghost, inspiring the wearer to use similar costumes to scare away a rival tribe.

Commonalities among the origin stories include elements of surprise, warfare, and of resemblance to ghosts. Such elements and their exaggerations in different retellings likely developed local appeal, as well as making an attractive tale for modern tourists.

== Design ==
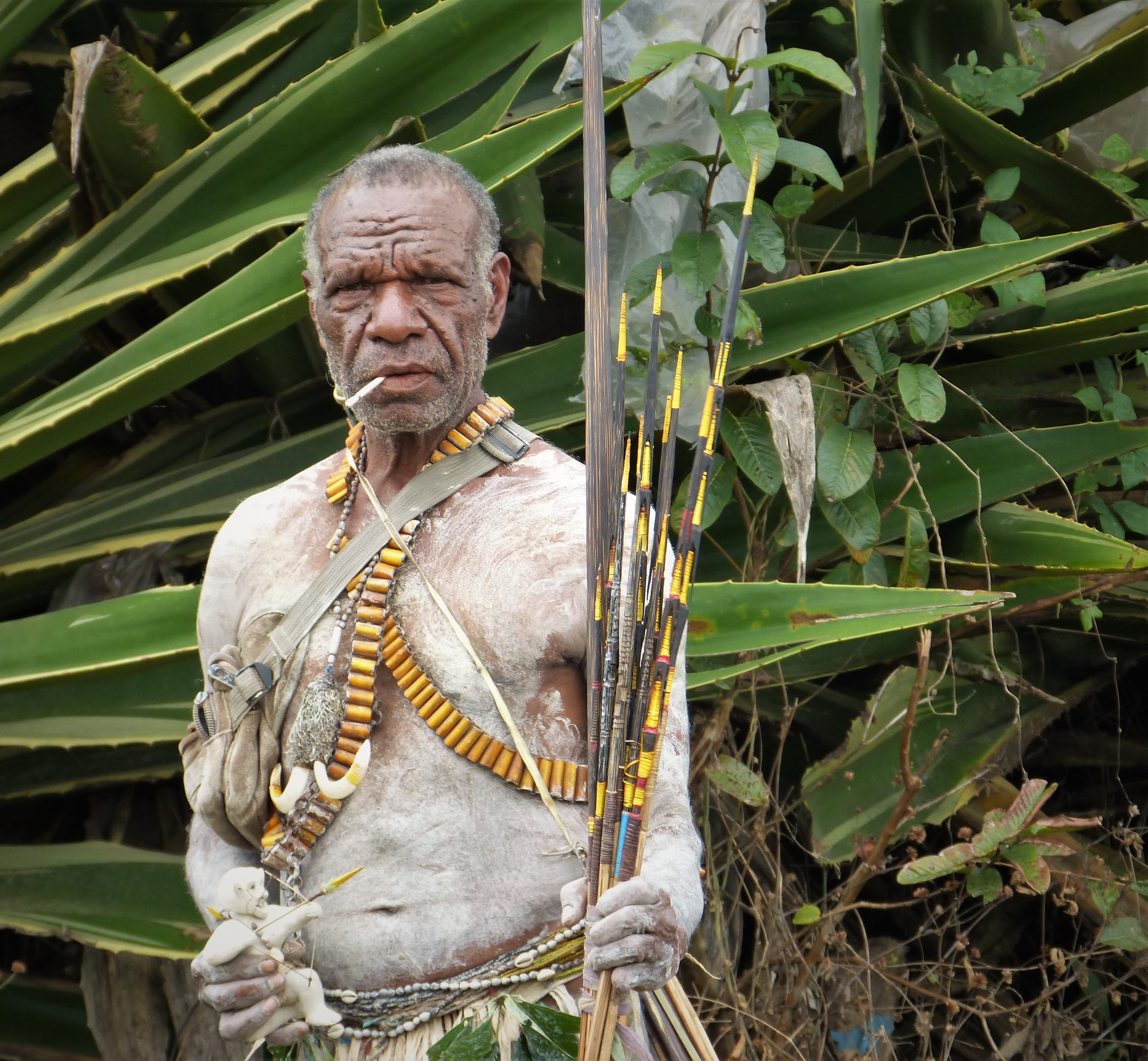
White body paint is used to complement the masks, although the heads are not painted under the mask.

The masks are made from clay, and decorated with items including pigs teeth and shells. The clay is traditionally sourced from the Asaro river, as this clay is said not to crack as it dries. While the original internal structure was a bamboo and bilum frame, banana tree roots began to be used in the 1970s, allowing for a more rounded shape. Later iterations used only clay, which was heavier and could only be worn for a few minutes, but is less time consuming to create. Masks also shifted from having mostly threatening features to including friendlier ones, which were thought to be preferred by tourists. When making the mask, a roughly oval head is created using a series of clay rings. Additional clay features including the elements of the face are added afterwards, and tattoos are sometimes added to the forehead and cheeks.

Mask wearers paint their skin (not including their masked heads) white, and wear long fingers made of bamboo.

The masks feature distinctive designs, including elongated or very short ears that extend to the chin or point upwards at the top, elongated eyebrows connected to the ears, horns, and mouths oriented sideways.

== Impact ==
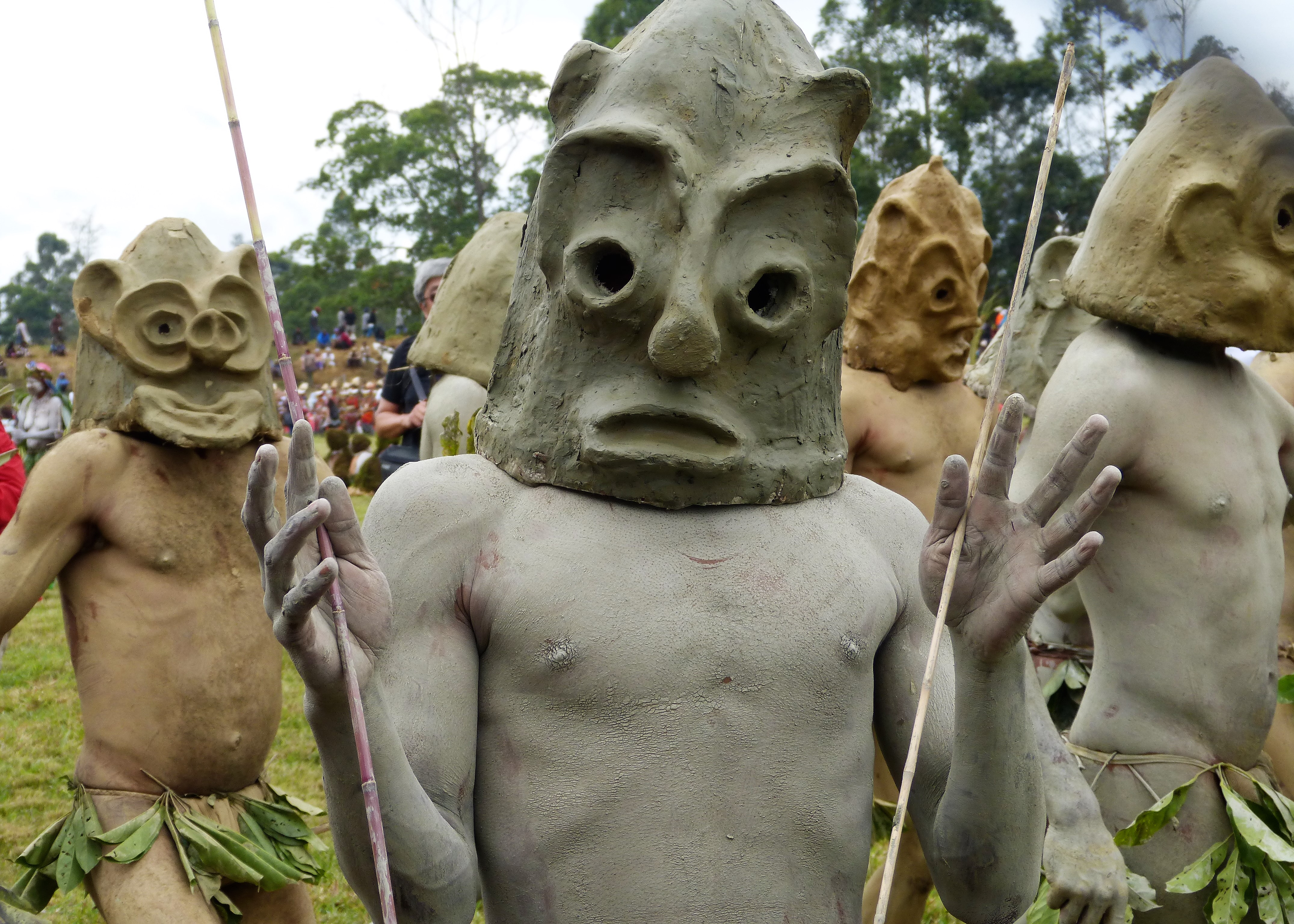
Asaro Mudmen in 2019

The Komunive village and its leadership benefited significantly from the tourism that the mudmen stories brought in, and have at times defended their cultural ownership of the tradition in court. There have also been disputes within Komunive about who should be considered an originator of the tradition, and thus who deserves to receive its economic benefits. Direct benefits likely go mostly to a small group of regular performers. However, the practice has become a symbol of cultural identity for the village, even for those who do not directly economically benefit.

While the people of Komunive view the mudmen tradition as their specific heritage, the economic draw of the dances has led to it being performed by other communities in the highlands, in an attempt to draw in tourists or as part of performances in hotels and festivals. This has caused concerns in Komunive about a dilution of their cultural heritage. It is likely that other cultural practices purportedly with long histories were created by other villages in the region to try and replicate the economic impact of the Asaro mudmen tradition.

To some extent the mudmen masks have developed into a wider regional cultural symbol for Goroka and nearby areas. Internationally, they are a recognisable image used to promote Papua New Guinea. Domestically they are used for advertising, including as a representation of the highlands. Internationally, mudmen have served as symbols representative of Papua New Guinea. In music, mudmen images have been used for techno and house music album covers. Mudmen also appeared on the back cover of the Pink Floyd album Obscured by Clouds, which included a song titled "Mudmen", and served as the soundtrack of the film La Vallée, which included a tribe resembling mudmen. Mudmen mask wearers appear in the horror film The Johnsons, although set in the Amazon rather than New Guinea. The adoption of the mudmen as a national symbol is an example of the development of a national kastom in the diverse country, which formerly had little unifying culture. While at the local level the tradition is associated with the unique culture of its village, its meaning as a national symbol is a unifying one.

== See also ==
- Paantu, a tradition of Miyako Island, Okinawa Prefecture.
- Lower Asaro Rural LLG
- Upper Asaro Rural LLG
- Asaro River
