= Owenia =

Owenia is the generic name of four groups of organisms. It can refer to:

- Owenia (plant), a genus of plants in the family Meliaceae
- Owenia (annelid) Delle Chiaje 1841, a genus of worms in the family Oweniidae
- Owenia (bird) Gray 1855, a genus of birds in the family Dinornithidae, now a synonym of Dinornis
- Owenia Kölliker, 1853, a genus of ctenophores, synonym of Haeckelia

== See also ==
- Oweina language, often miswritten Owenia
