= Oyana language =

Oyana may refer to:

- Alternative name of the Wayana language.
- A dialect of the Gadsup language, Oyana.
