= Waffa =

Waffa may be,

- Waffa language, New Guinea
- Susan Waffa-Ogoo, Gambia
- Waffa Bin Laden, USA/Switzerland
