= Binumarien language =

Kainantu language of Papua New Guinea

Binumarien
- Afaqinna ufa
- Pronunciation: [ɐɸɐʔínːɐ uɸɐ]
- Native to: Papua New Guinea
- Region: Eastern Highlands Province
- Native speakers: 1,200 (2019)
- Language family: Trans–New Guinea: Kainantu–Goroka; Kainantu; Tairora; Binumarien

Language codes
- ISO 639-3: bjr
- Glottolog: binu1245

Binumarien, or Afaqinna ufa as it is known to its speakers, is a Kainantu language of Papua New Guinea. The name used in the literature was used under Australian administration and is still used by Binumarien people when they speak Tok Pisin. It comes from the now-abandoned village of Pinumareena. Pinumareena is also one of the four Binumarien clans.

Binumarien is spoken by an ethnic group of the same name in Kainantu District, near the easternmost corner of the Eastern Highlands Province. The Austronesian language Adzera borders Binumarien in the north and east and the Papuan language Gadsup is spoken to the south and west.

== Current use ==
Binumarien has around 1,200 speakers, as members of the community reported in 2018. The number of speakers has increased enormously over the last decades. The language had 117 speakers in 1973, living in three small villages. According the memory of older people, the Binumarien used to be more numerous, but tribal fighting and malaria greatly had reduced their numbers. Since then, the Binumarien established more stable relations with the surrounding tribes, and moved to a higher altitude, making them less susceptible to malaria. Binumarien is the dominant language in most households, and is used in community gatherings and in church services; children grow up with Binumarien as their first language. In addition, they often know other languages spoken by family members from outside the village. People who marry into the community are expected to learn the language, and many Binumarien are fluent in one of the neighbouring languages, especially Tairora, Gadsup, and Adzera, and also in Tok Pisin, the lingua franca of the area.

== Phonology ==
=== Consonants ===
Length is contrastive only in nasal stops, compare for example [aːna] 'road' and [aːnːa] 'breath'.

Consonants of Binumarien
	Bilabial	Alveolar	Palatal	Velar	Labial– velar	Glottal
Plosive	p	t		k		ʔ
Nasal	m	n				
Fricative	ɸ	s				
Approximant			j		w	
Trill		r				

=== Vowels ===
Binumarien vowels contrast across five tongue positions. Close-mid vowels [eː] and [oː] are always long. Length is phonemic for the other vowels, creating three additional contrastive counterparts [iː], [ɑː], and [uː], although [iː] and [uː] are not common.

Vowels of Binumarien
	Front	Back
Close	i	u
Close-mid	eː	oː
Open		ɑ

=== Tones ===
Binumarien has two tones: high and low, which associate to the mora. Rising and falling contours occur on long vowels and diphthongs, as the result of a low mora followed by a high mora (rising), or a high mora followed by a low mora (falling).
