= YGR =

YGR or ygr may refer to:

- YGR, the IATA code for Îles-de-la-Madeleine Airport, Quebec, Canada
- ygr, the ISO 639-3 code for Yagaria language, Papua New Guinea
- YGR, Young God Records, an independent record label, New York, United States
