= Language preservation =

Efforts to save endangered languages

Language preservation is the preservation of endangered or dead languages. With language death, studies in linguistics, anthropology, prehistory and psychology lose diversity. As history is remembered with the help of historic preservation, language preservation maintains dying or dead languages for future studies in such fields. Organizations such as 7000 Languages and the Living Tongues Institute for Endangered Languages document and teach endangered languages as a way of preserving languages. Sometimes parts of languages are preserved in museums, such as tablets containing Cuneiform writing from Mesopotamia. Additionally, dictionaries have been published to help keep record of languages, such as the Kalapuya dictionary published by the Siletz tribe in Oregon.

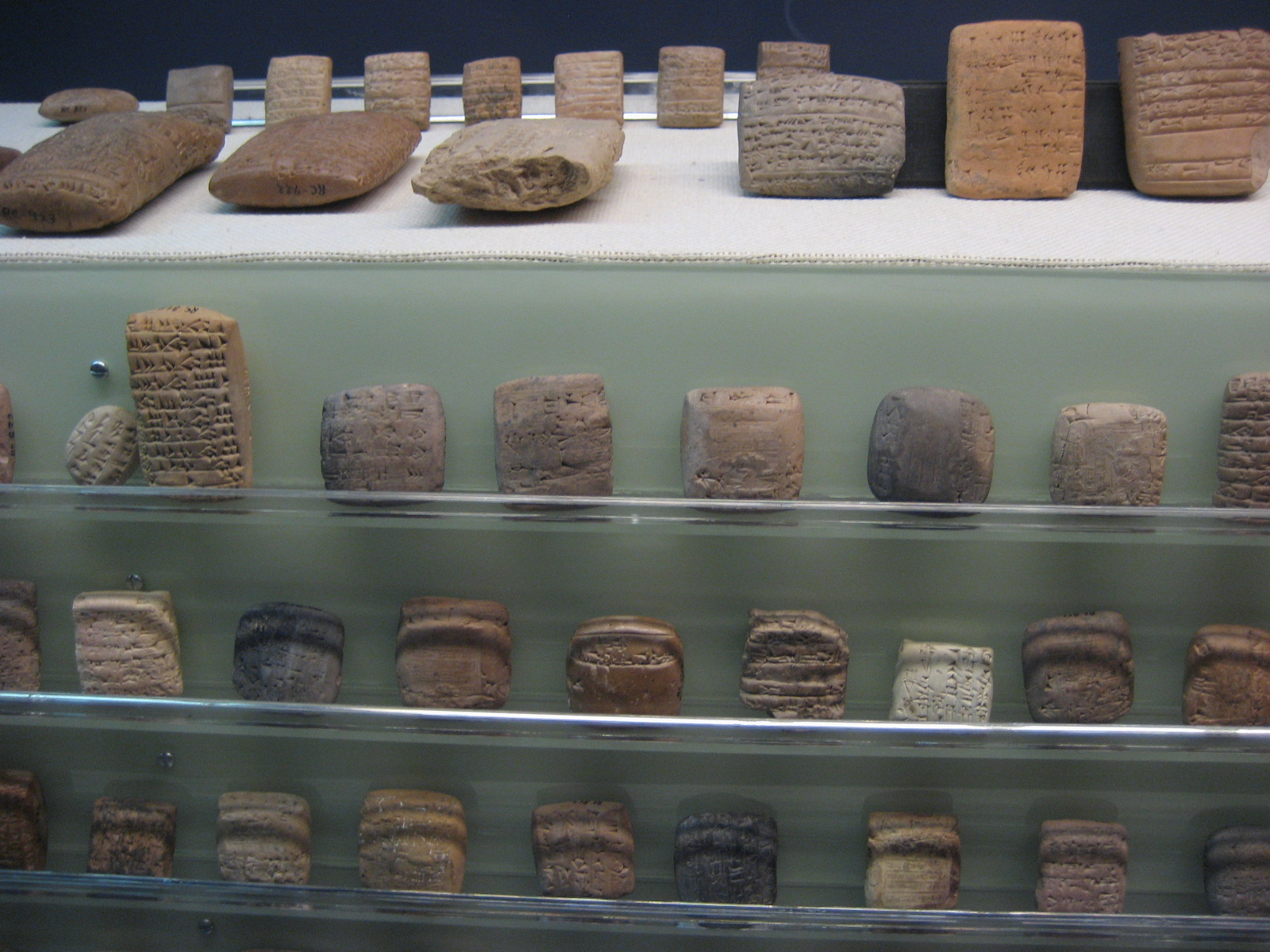
Cuneiform tablets preserved in a museum

Language is an important part of any society, because it enables people to communicate and express themselves. When a language dies out, future generations lose a vital part of the culture that is necessary to completely understand it. This makes language a vulnerable aspect of cultural heritage, and it becomes especially important to preserve it. According to the United Nations Educational, Scientific, and Cultural Organization (UNESCO), from facts published in their "Atlas of Languages in Danger of Disappearing", there are an estimated 7,000 languages spoken worldwide today, and half of the world's population speaks the eight most common.

More than 3,000 languages are reportedly spoken by fewer than 10,000 people each. Ethnologue, a reference work published by SIL International, has cataloged the world's known living languages, and it estimates that 417 languages are on the verge of extinction. Language protection is protection of cultural heritage, as Karl von Habsburg, President of Blue Shield International, states. "Today, on average, we lose one language in the world every six weeks. There are approximately 6800 languages. But four percent of the population speaks 96 percent of the languages, and 96 percent of the population speaks four percent of the languages. These four percent are spoken by large language groups and are therefore not at risk. But 96 percent of the languages we know are more or less at risk. You have to treat them like extinct species."

== Reasons for language endangerment or extinction ==
There are different factors that can put a language in danger of becoming extinct. One is when a language is no longer being taught to the children of the community, or at least to a large number of the children. In these cases, the remaining fluent speakers of the language are generally the older members of the community, and when they pass on, the language dies out with them.

Child speakers are not enough to ensure the survival of a language however. If the children who do speak the language are relocated to another area where it is not spoken, it becomes endangered. Political and military turmoil can also endanger a language. When people are forced from their homes into new lands, they may have to learn the language of the new area to adapt, and they end up losing their language. Likewise, when a country or territory is successfully invaded, the population may be forced to learn the invader's language.

A language can also become associated with a lower social class. In this instance, parents will encourage their children to use the language used more often in society to distance themselves from the perceived lower class. Within one or two generations of this occurrence, the language can easily be lost.

== Methods of preservation ==
=== Schooling ===
One way to preserve languages is to encourage younger generations to speak their native language as they grow, so that they will then teach their children the language as well. Introducing local native languages in schools would accelerate this process. However, school systems are experiencing a decline in incorporating foreign languages, especially in the United States. According to the American Academy of Arts and Sciences, American students are first introduced to secondary-language-learning in either middle or high school, yet there has been a 17% decline in middle schools teaching secondary languages between 1996 and 2008. Marty Abbott, the executive director of the American Council on the Teaching of Foreign Languages, considers the decline and lack of foreign language curricula in American schools as a matter of a lack of confidence students exhibit when learning new languages.

Global efforts have been made, as well, on including native local languages in public schools to foster cultural growth. Introduced in India from a recommendation by the University Education Commission, the three-language formula became a foundation for a balanced linguistic policy. When it was concocted, the three languages were English, Hindi, and a local tongue. Although this program failed in India due to lack of public fervor and government funding, it thrived in Kazakhstan, where their three languages are English, Kazakh, and Russian. English served as a 'world' language that was seen as a push for economic and business prowess on the international level, while Kazakh and Russian were seen as the glue to Kazakhstan's culture and nationality.

=== Modern technology ===
The internet can be used to raise awareness about the issues of language extinction and language preservation. It can be used to translate, catalog, store, and provide information and access to languages. New technologies such as podcasts can be used to preserve the spoken versions of languages, and written documents can preserve information about the native literature and linguistics of languages.

The international internet provider VeriSign estimates that 65–70% of all internet content is in English.

Using written documents to preserve information about the native literature and linguistics is also not without potential problems. Just because a language is written down, this does not mean it will survive. Written information in book or manuscript form is subject to acid issues, binding problems, environmental monitoring problems, and security concerns.

Technology can also be used to preserve the integrity of spoken versions of languages. Many of the same techniques used in recording oral history can be used to preserve spoken languages. Preservationists can use reel-to-reel audio tape recordings, along with video recordings, and new technologies like podcasts to record spoken accounts of languages. Technology is also vulnerable to new technology. Preservation efforts would fail if the technology to listen to or watch certain media such as audio tape recordings or video tapes is lost.

Typeface design can offer a way of preservation with digital and print media. An example of this can be seen with the Cultural Centre of the Philippines. In honor of the CCP's 50th anniversary, they released a typeface called BayBayan, mixing Baybayin with the Tagalog word bayan, meaning community. This project was to push the interest and awareness of the script among the youth, encouraging it to become a form of communication versus how often it has been used as a decorative element (TDC, 2019). The design of the typeface matches phonetically with Baybayin and the Latin alphabet in a san serif form, meaning the designers had to understand to some extent, both scripts in order to succeed with the design. It encompasses Filipino culture as a whole, creating a sort of bridge between pre-colonial and contemporary times, providing a gateway into learning about the language.

=== Examples ===
The Administration for Native Americans has published the "Reference Guide for Establishing Archives and Repositories", which explains why language repositories are vital to long-term language preservation efforts. The guide offers practical advice on what to preserve and why; it explains what a language repository is, how to build one, and the costs involved; and lists other resources for creating an archive and repository.

The Kalapuya dictionary published by the Siletz tribe in Oregon was fundraised through an online platform, GoFundMe, and as of March 2022 they published 150 copies after raising $13,000. The Siletz tribe is able to speak Kalapuya at a preschool level, due to a lack of documentation of the language.

== Lingua Libre ==
Lingua Libre is an online collaborative project and tool by the Wikimedia France association, which can be used as a tool for Language Preservation. Lingua Libre enables one to record words, phrases, or sentences of any language, oral (audio recording) or signed (video recording). It is a highly efficient method to record endangered languages since up to 1000 words can be recorded per hour. All the content is under Free License, and speakers of minority languages are encouraged to record their own dialects.

== See also ==
- Lingua Libre
- Language policy
- Rosetta Project
- Aikuma software for language preservation
