= Kainantu–Goroka languages =

Language family

Kainantu–Goroka
- East Highlands
- Geographic distribution: highlands of Kainantu and Goroka, Eastern Highlands Province, Papua New Guinea
- Linguistic classification: Trans–New Guinea: Eastern Highlands – Kratke Range; Kainantu–Goroka
- Subdivisions: Goroka; Kainantu

Language codes
- Glottolog: kain1273
- Map: The Kainantu–Goroka languages of New Guinea The Kainantu–Goroka languages Other Trans–New Guinea languages Other Papuan languages Austronesian languages Uninhabited

The Kainantu–Goroka languages are a family of Papuan languages established by Arthur Capell in 1948 under the name East Highlands. They formed the core of Stephen Wurm's 1960 East New Guinea Highlands family (the precursor of Trans–New Guinea), and are one of the larger branches of Trans–New Guinea in the 2005 classification of Malcolm Ross.

== Languages ==
The constituent Kainantu and Goroka families are clearly valid groups, and both William A. Foley and Timothy Usher consider their TNG identity to be established. The languages are:

- Goroka family
  - Daulo
    - Siane, Yaweyuha
    - Gahuku: Alekano (Gahuku), Asaro River: Dano (Upper Asaro), Tokano (Lower Asaro)
  - Benabena
  - South Goroka: Fore, Gimi
  - Isabi, Gende
  - Henganofi
    - Abaga
    - Kamono (Kamano)
    - Fayatina River
      - Kanite, Inoke-Yate
      - Yagaria
    - (?Ke’yagana) [subsumed under another language by Usher]
- Kainantu family
  - Kenati
  - Tairoric (East Kainantu): Binumarien (Afaqina), Tairoa (North Tairora, Omwunra, Vinaata), Waffa
  - Gauwa (West Kainantu)
    - Gadsup (Oyana, Akuna, Ontenu), Agarabi, Kambaira
    - Awa, Oweina
    - Auyana: Awiyaana (incl. Kosena), Usarufa

== Pronouns ==
The pronouns reconstructed by Ross (2005) for proto-Kainantu–Goroka, proto-Kainantu, and proto-Goroka are as follows:

proto-Kainantu–Goroka
	sg	pl
1	*ná	*tá[za]
2	*ká[za]	*tá-na-
3	*[y]á, *wá	*yá[na]

proto-Kainantu
	sg	du	pl
1	*né	*té[ze]-	*té[ze]
2	*é[ze]	*[te]né-
3	*wé

proto-Goroka
	sg	pl
1	*ná	*tá[za]
2	*ká	*tá-na-gaza, *tí-na-gaza
3	*[y]á	*[y]á-na-gaza, *í-na-gaza

The possessive forms are:

proto-Kainantu–Goroka
	sg	pl
1	*na-i	*ta-i
2	*ka	*tana-i
3	*[y]a, *wa	*ya-i, *yana-i

== Modern reflexes ==
Kainantu–Goroka reflexes of proto-Trans-New Guinea (pTNG) etyma are:

Awa language:

- are 'ear' < *kand(e,i)k(V]
- nu 'louse' < *niman

Tairora language:

- ato 'ear' < *kand(e,i)k(V]
- ir 'tree' < *inda
- (n)am 'breast' < *amu
- nume 'louse' < *niman
- kubu 'short' < *k(a,u)tu(p,mb)aC
- mi- 'give' < *mV-

Fore language:

- na- 'eat' < *na-
- numaa 'louse' < *niman
- mi- 'give' < *mV-
- amune 'egg' < *mun(a,i,u)ka
- kasa 'new' < *kVndak
- mone 'nose' < *mundu

Gende language:

- ami 'breast' < *amu
- mut 'belly' < *mundun 'internal organs'
- mina- 'stay' < *mVna-
- nogoi 'water < *[n]ok
- (tu)nima 'louse' < *niman
- me- 'give' < *mV-

Innovations in proto-Kainantu-Goroka replacing proto-Trans-New Guinea forms:

- *tá[za] '1pl' replaces pTNG *ni, *nu
- *tá-na '2pl' replaces pTNG *ŋgi, *ja
- genitive forms ending in *-i

== Vocabulary comparison ==
Gorokan basic vocabulary from William A. Foley (1986).

Despite the presence of reconstructions in the left column, the words cited constitute translation equivalents, whether they are cognate (e.g. ya, yafa, yava for “tree”) or not (e.g. tuva, logo, hali for “fire”).

gloss	Proto-Gorokan	Gende	Siane	Benabena	Kamono–Yagaria	Fore
'two'	*tote	ogondrari	lele	loe	lole	tara
'man'	*we	vei	we	vo	ve	wa
'water'	*no(k)	nogoi	no	nagami	ni(na)	wani
'fire'		tuva	yo	logo	hali	yakuʔ
'tree'	*ya	izo	ya	yafa	yava	yaː
'leaf'		kuruma	aila	haya(ʔa)	haeya	aʔyeʔ
'root'	*supa	tovaya	lufawa	lufusa(ʔa)	havu	aubu
'house'	*nom	nomu	numu(na)	no(hi)	yo(na)	naːmaʔ
'breast'	*ami	ami-	ami(na)	amiha(ʔa)	ami(maʔa)	nono
'tooth'	*wa	va(iza)	auma	yogo(ʔa)	(ä)vep	(a)wa
'bone'	*yampu	yami-	auma	felisa(ʔa)	(a)pu(va)	(a)yaːmpu
'ear'	*ke/a	ka-	ka(la)	(e)kesa(ʔa)	(ä)geta	(a)ge
'hair'	*yoka	yogo	yowa(la)	oka(ʔa)	(a)yokaʔ	(a)yaːʔ
'leg'	*kia	kia-	kiya(na)	gigusa(ʔa)	(a)gia	(a)gisaː
'blood'	*kota	mamia-	wanu	golaha(ʔa)	gola(na)	koraːʔ
'hand'	*ya	ya	a(na)	yaha(ʔa)	(ä)ya	ya
'egg'	*mut	mura	mula	mu(ʔa)	mu(na)	amuʔ
'sun'	*po	po	fo	yafi	yafo	yaːbu
'axe'	*tu	tu	luna	lu	lu	tuʔ
'netbag'	*ko	ko	owo	gu(ʔi)	gu(na)	koʔ
'eat'	*na-	na-	n-	na-	no-	na-
'die'	*puti-	pri-	fol-	fili-	fili-	puri-
'say'	*si-	ti-	l-	li-	hi-	i-
'give'	*mi-	imi-	om-	m-	mi-	mi-
'big'	*(n)ampa	namba	namba	napa	legepa	tabe

Kainantu basic vocabulary from William A. Foley (1986):

gloss	Awa	Auyana	Gadsup	Tairora
'two'	tɔtare	kaiʔa	kaantani	taaraʔanta
'man'	wɛ	waiya	banta	bainti
'water'	no	nomba	nomi	namari
'fire'	ira	irama	ikai	iha
'tree'	ta	taima	yaani	katari
'leaf'	ɔnɔ	anama	anai	mare
'root'	anuʔ	anuʔa	anuʔi	tuʔa
'house'	nɔ	naamba	maʔi	naabu
'breast'	nɔ	naamba	naami	naama
'tooth'	awɛ	awaiyamba	abakuni	aabai
'bone'	ayɔnta	ayaantamba	ayampai	buhaarima
'ear'	ɔre	aʔa	aakami	aato
'hair'	(a)yɔra	aayara	-nyoi	kauhi
'leg'	ai	aisamima	akani	aiʔu
'blood'	nɛe	naema	naarei	naare
'hand'	ayɔnobeh	ayamba	aayaami	kauʔu
'egg'	au	auma	amuʔi	auru
'sun'	popoʔnah	aabauma	ikona	kauri
'axe'	konaro	koraroba	kuntaʔi	kaarima
'netbag'	unɔ	unaamba	unaami	uta
'eat'	nɔno	nare	naano	naana
'die'	pukire	pukai	pukono	ʔutubiro
'say'	iraruwo	siyo	seʔu	tiena
'give'	awiʔ	ami	ameno	amina
'big'	aanotɔ	anomba	inoʔna	nora

== Proto-languages ==
Some lexical reconstructions of Proto-East Kainantu and Proto-North Kainantu by Usher (2020) are:

gloss	Proto-East Kainantu	Proto-North Kainantu
head	*piᵄtɐ	*noːN
hair/feather	*jɐᵘsi	*jɐᵘ
ear	*ɑːtoː	*ɑːʔ
eye	*wu	*u
nose	*ipi	*siʔ
tooth	*wɐⁱ	*wɐj
tongue	*m₂ɑːpiɾi	*[m/n][ɐⁱ]piɾ
leg	*ipu	*tɐɾ
blood	*wi[ʔt]ipɐ	*nɑːɾeː
bone	*muʔjɑːni	*(ɐ-)jɐNpɐ
breast	*nɑːNmɐ	*nɑːN
louse	*numɐ	*nuN
dog	*w₂ɐⁱni	*ijɐN
pig	*p₂uᵄɾɐ	*poːɾ
bird	*inɑːmɐ; *uwini	*nuN
egg	*uɾu	*uɾ
tree	*jɐtɐɾi	*jɑːj
sun	*j₂uᵄni	*ɑːʔ
moon	*[u]toːnɐ	*wi[ɾ]oːN
water	*noːni	*noːN
fire	*iʔjɐ	*itɐ
stone	*oːni	*oː[ɾ/j]
path	*ɑːni	*ɑːj
man	*wɐⁱ-iNti	*wɑːⁱNsɐ
woman	*ɐnɑːjeː	*ɐnɑːsi
name	*utu	*wiʔ
eat	*nɐ-	
one	*moːʔjɑː	*mɐnɑː
two	*tɑːɾɐ	*tɑːN

== See also ==
- East New Guinea Highlands languages, an expansion of Kainantu–Goroka in Wurm 1975, which was later abandoned by Ross due to a lack of unifying morphological data.

== Bibliography ==
- Ross, Malcolm (2005). "Pronouns as a preliminary diagnostic for grouping Papuan languages". In Andrew Pawley; Robert Attenborough; Robin Hide; Jack Golson (eds.). Papuan pasts: cultural, linguistic and biological histories of Papuan-speaking peoples. Canberra: Pacific Linguistics. pp. 15–66. doi:10.15144/PL-572. ISBN 0858835622. OCLC 67292782.
- Ross, Malcolm. 2014. Proto-Kainantu-Goroka. TransNewGuinea.org.
- Ross, Malcolm. 2014. Proto-Goroka. TransNewGuinea.org.
- Ross, Malcolm. 2014. Proto-Kainantu. TransNewGuinea.org.
- Proto-Eastern Kainantu-Goroka. TransNewGuinea.org. From Scott, G. 1978. The Fore language of Papua New Guinea. Canberra: Pacific Linguistics.
- Proto-Eastern-Central Gorokan. TransNewGuinea.org. From Scott, G. 1978. The Fore language of Papua New Guinea. Canberra: Pacific Linguistics.
