= Vida Chenoweth =

American musician

- Born: October 18, 1928; Enid, Oklahoma, U.S.
- Died: December 14, 2018 (aged 90) Enid, Oklahoma, U.S.
- Genres: classical
- Occupations: Marimbist; ethnomusicologist; linguist
- Years active: 1956–1961

Vida Chenoweth (October 18, 1928 – December 14, 2018) was an American solo classical marimbist, ethnomusicologist, and linguist.

Credited with being the first to perform polyphonic music on the marimba and for doing for the marimba what Pablo Casals did for the cello and Andrés Segovia did for the guitar, she made her solo debut in Chicago in 1956, followed by a successful recital in New York. She subsequently gave concerts throughout the US and in Europe and the Americas.

Chenoweth, with her premiere of the Kurka marimba concerto in 1959, joined marimbist Ruth Stuber as one of the very few marimbists to perform in Carnegie Hall up to that time. Stuber premiered Paul Creston's "Concertino for Marimba with orchestra," which he had written for her, in Carnegie Hall in 1940.

After a hand injury when she was in her early 30s, she played a self-described farewell concert in Oklahoma in 1962 and retired from marimba performance to focus on mission work. She studied musicology and bible translation and became a missionary in New Guinea where she used her musicology training in developing her Christian message with indigenous music.

She was inducted into the Oklahoma Hall of Fame in 1985 and into the Percussive Arts Society Hall of Fame in 1994 .

== Early life ==
Chenoweth's family owned a music store in Enid, Oklahoma and she was encouraged by her older brother to take up classical marimba.

The first instrument Chenoweth attempted was the piano but had to stop due to a broken index finger.

Sydney David, a local music teacher, gave her initial instruction on the marimba in 1941. While in high school in 1948, she studied under Clair Omar Musser at Northwestern University and was a member of his marimba orchestra, which performed in Chicago in 1948.

Chenoweth also studied composition and wrote pieces for marimba. She attended William Woods College in Missouri, transferring to Northwestern for her final two years of study and emerged with a double degree in music criticism and marimba performance. For graduate school, Chenoweth attended the American Conservatory in Chicago from 1952 to 1953, where she studied pedagogy of music theory, and canon and fugue with Stella Roberts, a pupil of Nadia Boulanger, and earned a double degree in music theory and percussion.

== Music career ==
Chenoweth made her solo debut in Chicago in 1956, followed by a successful recital in New York and numerous other concerts around the world. In 1959 she premiered the Concerto for Marimba composed for her by Robert Kurka, and in 1961, she performed Paul Creston's Concertino for Marimba, both with the Orchestra of America conducted by Richard Korn.

She was inducted into the Percussive Arts Society Hall of Fame in 1994.

== As linguist and ethnomusicologist ==
In 1961 she nearly lost the fingers of her right hand in a gas oven explosion which left her hand severely burned. Unable to regain complete freedom of movement, she turned her attention toward linguistics and ethnomusicology.

She went to the Territory of New Guinea and served for thirteen years with Wycliffe Bible Translators as a linguist and Bible translator. There, with colleague Darlene Bee, she lived with the Usarufa tribe and learned their unwritten language. After Dr. Bee’s death, she completed a translation of the New Testament in Usarufa. Meanwhile, she studied the music of the Usarufas and many other tribes and became internationally known as a scholar who pioneered a new method of ethnic music analysis. She authored eleven books, including her textbooks Melodic Perception and Analysis and The Usarufas and Their Music, and numerous articles on the validity of oral music traditions throughout the world. She then developed a program in ethnomusicology for the Wheaton College Conservatory of Music based on her own theory of analyzing the music of unwritten music traditions. She retired as International Consultant for Wycliffe and as Professor of Ethnomusicology at Wheaton College and archived her nearly 1000 field tapes of world music in the Library of Congress.

In 1974 she earned a Ph.D. in ethnomusicology at the University of Auckland, New Zealand. She is included in seven different Who’s Who lists and is named as one of the two thousand outstanding musicians of the twentieth century.

In 1990, Chenoweth was interviewed by the Chicago Tribune while a professor at the Conservatory of Music, which housed more than 700 tapes she had recorded.

== Bibliography ==
=== Books ===
- 1964. The Marimbas of Guatemala. Lexington: University of Kentucky Press.
- 1972. Melodic Perception and Analysis. Ukarumpa, Papua New Guinea: Summer Institute of Linguistics.
- 1974. Music of the Usarufas (2 vols.). PhD diss. University of Auckland.
- 1976. Musical Instruments of Papua New Guinea. Ukarumpa, Papua New Guinea: Summer Institute of Linguistics.
- 1979. [www.sil.org/acpub/repository/15498.pdf The Usarufas and Their Music]. Dallas: SIL Museum of Anthropology.
- 1980. Music for the Eastern Highlands, A Music Primer. Ukarumpa, Papua New Guinea: Summer Institute of Linguistics.
- 1984. A Music Primer for the North Solomons Province, Summer Institute of Linguistics, Ukarumpa, Papua New Guinea
- 1985. Rotokas Music Primer, Summer Institute of Linguistics, Ukarumpa, Papua New Guinea
- 2000. Sing-Sing: Communal Singing and Dancing of New Guinea Peoples. Christchurch: University of Canterbury Macmillan Brown Centre for Pacific Studies.
- 2001. Melodic Perception and Analysis Revised. Auckland: St. Albans Print 1979 Ltd.
- 2006. Melodic Perception and Analysis Revised. Lansdale, PA: Virginia Whitney.
- ———, trans. 1978, Information on the Marimba, English translation of Noticias sobre la Marimba, by David Vela. Auckland: Institute Press.
- Bee, Darlene, and ———, trans., with Imaaqo and Maaroni. 1980, The New Testament in Usarufa. South Holland, IL: Park Press.

=== Articles ===
- 1957. “The Marimba Comes into Its Own.” Music Journal (May–June).
- 1959. “Made in Guatemala.” American Record Guide (May).
- 1959. “The Marimba.” International Musician (November).
- 1961. “The Differences Among Xylophone, Marimba, Vibraphone.” The Instrumentalist (June), 68.
- 1962. “Pioneering the Marimba.” Music Journal (September).
- 1963. “The Language of Hymns.” Practical Anthropology 10 (6).
- 1963. “Defining the Marimba and the Xylophone Inter-Culturally.” Percussionist 1 (1).
- 1963. “Mallet Position with 2 Mallets.” Percussionist10 (2).
- 1963. “4-Mallet Technique.” Percussionist 10 (2).
- 1964. “The Marimba, A Challenge to Composers (Part 1).” The Ludwig Drummer 4 (1).
- 1964. “The Marimba, A Challenge to Composers (Part 2).” The Ludwig Drummer 4 (2).
- 1964. “Pioneering the Marimba.” Percussive Notes (December).
- 1966. “Correspondence Re Ethnic Hymnody.” The Bible Translator. 17 (2).
- 1966. “Song Structure of a New Guinea Highlands Tribe.” Ethnomusicology 10 (3):285–97.
- 1967. “The Voice of Music.” New Guinea Informant, April, Summer Institute of Linguistics, Ukarumpa, Papua New Guinea.
- 1968. “Managalasi Mourning Songs.” Ethnomusicology 12 (3):415–18.
- 1969. “An Investigation of the Singing Styles of the Dunas.” Oceania 39 (3):218–30.
- 1970. “Psalms, Hymns and Spiritual Songs.” (Wycliffe Bible Translators) Translation 5 (3).
- 1971. “The Marimba and the Xylophone.” The School Musicican (February).
- 1971. “Let the New Guineans Sing.” Sharing, October, Summer Institute of Linguistics, Ukarumpa, Papua New Guinea.
- 1973. “Music of Papua New Guinea.” Grove’s Dictionary of Music. New York: St. Martin’s.
- 1977. “Musical Literacy.” READ: The Adult Literacy and Literature Magazine 12 (2–3).
- 1977. “Musical Literacy.” READ: The Adult Literacy and Literature Magazine 12 (4).
- 1978. “Musical Literacy.” READ: The Adult Literacy and Literature Magazine 13 (1): 38–39.
- 1979. “The Christian Musician’s Role within a Cultural Context.” (MS) monograph for Faith and Learning Seminar, Wheaton College, Wheaton, IL.
- 1980. “Music of Papua New Guinea.” The New Grove Dictionary of Music and Musicians, 14:88–96. London: Macmillan.
- 1980. “Descriptive Linguistics and the Ethnomusicologist.” Wheaton College Scholastic Honor Society Reports, 83. Wheaton, IL.
- 1981. Review of “Sound-producing Instruments in Traditional Society: A Study of Esoteric Instruments and their Role in Male-Female Relations.” 1981 Yearbook for Traditional Music, 21–23. Port Moresby: Institute of Papua New Guinea Studies.
- 1982. Review of “Ethnomusicology: Pacific Issue.” The Journal of the Polynesian Society, 91: 311–13.
- 1983. Review of Music of Oceania: Papua New Guinea: The Middle Sepik. Musicaphon disc no. BM 30 SL 2700, and Music of Oceania: Papua New Guinea: The Iatmul of Papua Niugini, Musicaphon disc no. BM 30 SL 2701, Institute for Musicology of the University of Basle. The Journal of the Polynesian Society 2:145–47.
- 1984. “Guidelines for Developing a Hymnody in the Indigenous Church.” (Summer Institute of Linguistics) Accent on Anthropology, March.
- 1984. Review of Bikmaus: A Quarterly Journal of Papua New Guinea Affairs, Ideas and Arts. (Institute of Papua New Guinea Studies)1984 Yearbook of Traditional Music, 132–33.
- 1984. “Spare Them Western Music!” Evangelical Missions Quarterly 20:30–35.
- 1985. “Music in Cross-Cultural Communication.” (Summer Institute of Linguistics) Notes on Anthropology 1, 12–14.
- 1985. “Practicing Hints.” In Master Technique Builders for Vibraphone and Marimba, ed. Anthony Cirone, 73–75. Miami: Belwyn Mills.
- 1986. “Music as Discourse.” Word; Journal of the International Linguistic Association 37 (1–2): 135–139.
- 1987. “Lost in Music.” The Market Place: The International Magazine for Papua New Guinea.
- 1988. “Documenting Papua New Guinea Legends.” READ: The Adult Literacy and Literature Magazine 23 (2): 30.
- 1989. “I Remember When….” The Three Arts Club of Chicago, 75th Anniversary Special, Vol.2, No.1, March Chicago
- 1994. “The Eastern Highlands.” In Universe of Music History, ed. Richard Moyle. Auckland: University of Auckland Press.
- 1995. “Cultural Change and Music Literacy.” Occasional Papers in Pacific Ethnomusicology 4, Anthropology Dept., University of Auckland.
- 1995. “March 6.” Stones of Remembrance (devotional calendar), 65. Wheaton, IL: Wheaton College.
- 1996. “Melanesia.” In Music Cultures of the Pacific, the Near East, and Asia, 3rd ed., 14. Upper Saddle River, NJ: Prentice Hall.
- 1996. “Perseverance and Patience.” (Summer Institute of Linguistics) EM News 5 (1): 1–2.
- 1996. “The Etic-Emic Distinction Applied to Music Analysis.” The Twenty-Third LACUS Forum, The Linguistic Association of Canada and the United States, Chapel Hill.
- 1997. “If Universals in Music Exist.” In Festschrift for Harold M. Best, Retiring Dean of Wheaton Conservatory of Music. Wheaton, IL: Wheaton College.
- 1997. “1997 Cook Islands Recording Project: A Report.” Newsletter of the Fellowship of Christian Percussionists 4 (2).
- 1998. “Library of Congress Archiving Report.” (Summer Institute of Linguistics) EM News 17 (1).
- 1998. “6-Mallet Etude.” Percussion News, July.
- 1998. “The Marimba, a Challenge to Composers.” Penn Sounds, Winter.
- 1999. Following articles in Encyclopedia of World Music: Australia and the South Pacific, ed. Adrienne L. Kaeppler and J. W. Love. New York: Garland.

“Tannese Festivals,” 63–65; “Music as Knowledge: Tonal Centers,” 296; “Structure: Melodic Structure in the Eastern Highlands Province of Papua New Guinea,” 302–3; “Compositional Processes: Investigating Usarufa Composition,” 357–58; “Musical Composition in Irian Jaya/West Papua,” 360–61; “Dreaming Music on Mota,” 362; “Enga Province,” 533–36; Abelam: A Musical View,” 550–52; “West Sepik Province,” 560–61; “Morobe Province: Buang,” 566–67; “Komba,” 571–72; “Umboi and Its Music,” 574–76; “Irian Jaya/ West Papua Province of Indonesia,” 578–79; “New Ireland Province,” 626–27; “North Solomons Province: Halia,” 640–42; “Teop Island,” 642–44; “Buin,” 651–54; “Solomon Islands – Isabel Province,” 657–59; “Vanuatu – Mota, Banks Islands,” 698–702.

- 1999. “Do Universals in Music Exist?” Evangelical Missions Quarterly 35 (2):161–63.
- 2000. The Significance of Music in the Holy Bible: With Emphasis on Instrumental Music in the Old Testament. Enid, OK: Dougherty.
- 2001. Review of The Value of Indigenous Music in the Life and Ministry of the Church: The United Church in the Duke of York Islands, by Andrew Midian. The Contemporary Pacific, 604–5.
- 2001. “Your Flight.” Percussive Notes, December.
- 2001. “The Influence of Linguistic Processes on Ethnic Music Analysis.” Paper presented at TAONGA of the Asia Pacific Rim, Conference of the New Zealand Society of Music Educators & International Society of Music Educators, Auckland.
- 2002. “Perseverance and Patience.” Ethnodoxology, December.
- 2005. “Earth Drum.” Percussive Notes: Journal of the Percussive Arts Society 43 (5): 48.
- 2006. “What Do You Mean by ‘Transcribe’?” Percussive Notes: Journal of the Percussive Arts Society 44 (1): 36.
- ——— and Darlene Bee. 1968. “On Ethnic Music.” Practical Anthropology 15 (5). (Translated into Spanish, 1979, Dialogo Hermandad Maya 10:5–19.)
- ——— . 1969. “Our Language Is Too Hard.” Translation (Wycliffe Bible Translators; October–December).
- ——— . 1971. “Comparative-Generative Models of a New Guinea Melodic Structure.” American Anthropologist 73 (3):733–82.
- ——— (contributing author). 1981. “Melanesia: Papua New Guinea.” The New Grove Dictionary of Music and Musicians, 12. London: Macmillan,

=== Compositions ===
- 1950. Hommage à Bartók, for marimba and piano.
- 1951. Pointillism, for marimba, flute and clarinet (optional cello/ drum)
- 1953. Invention (#1), for solo marimba.
- 1956. Granada, arranged for solo marimba. New York: Southern Music.
- 1993. Four Central American Folk Tunes, for solo marimba. Everett, PA: HoneyRock.
- 1994. Lament, HoneyRock Music Publishers, Everett, PA
- 1997. Three for Four Mallets, oral tradition arranged for solo marimba. Everett, PA: HoneyRock Music.
- ———, ed. 1993. Marimba: 7 Bach Chorales. Miami, FL: CPP/Belwin.

== Guest soloist ==
- New York Summer Festival Orchestra 1955
- Oklahoma City Symphony 1956
- Charlotte Little Symphony 1956
- Brevard Festival Orchestra 1956
- Cleveland Orchestra 1956
- National Orchestra of Guatemala 1957
- University of Mexico City Symphony 1957
- Wellesley Community Orchestra 1958
- Brevard Festival Orchestra (return engagement) 1959
- Orchestra of America (return engagement) 1959
- Baltimore Symphony 1959
- Iowa State Symphony 1960
- National Orchestra of Guatemala (return engagement) 1960
- Orchestra of America (return engagement) 1961
- Tulsa Philharmonic 1964
- South Africa Broadcasting Orchestra (twice) 1969
- Oklahoma City Symphony (return engagement) 1970
- New Zealand Orchestra (in Wellington, Masterton, and Auckland) 1971
