= Abaga language =

Kainantu–Goroka language native to Papua New Guinea

Abaga
- Wagama
- Native to: Papua New Guinea
- Region: Eastern Highlands Province
- Ethnicity: 1,000 (2017)
- Native speakers: 600 (2017)
- Language family: Trans–New Guinea: ? Kainantu–Goroka; Goroka; Kamono–Yagaria; Abaga

Language codes
- ISO 639-3: abg
- Glottolog: abag1245
- ELP: Abaga
- Abaga is classified as Critically Endangered by the UNESCO Atlas of the World's Languages in Danger.

Abaga or Wagama is a nearly extinct Trans–New Guinea language of Papua New Guinea. It appears to be related to Kamono and Yagaria.

The classification of Abaga is disputed. It may actually be a Kamano–Yagaria language, and not a Finisterre–Huon language with heavy influence as proposed before.

== Vocabulary ==
=== Numerals ===
Abaga numerals
Abaga	English	Example	Ref.
menasi	one	menasi korumpai ("one stone")	
tera	two	tera korumpai ("two stones")	
