= Yagaria Rural LLG =

Local-level government in Papua New Guinea

- Location within Papua New Guinea
- Coordinates: 6.354367°S 145.456771°E
- Country: Papua New Guinea
- Province: Eastern Highlands Province
- Time zone: UTC+10 (AEST)

District map of Eastern Highlands Province

Yagaria Rural LLG is a local-level government (LLG) of Eastern Highlands Province, Papua New Guinea. The Yagaria language is spoken in the LLG.

== Wards ==
- 01. Higivavi
- 02. Oliguti
- 03. Kami
- 04. Forapi No. 1
- 05. Litipinaga
- 06. Gotomi
- 07. Lufugu
- 08. Kiseveroka
- 09. Kogoraipa
- 10. Daginava
- 11. Nupuru
