= Gahuku Rural LLG =

Local-level government in Papua New Guinea

- Location within Papua New Guinea
- Coordinates: 6.04°S 145.41°E
- Country: Papua New Guinea
- Province: Eastern Highlands Province
- Time zone: UTC+10 (AEST)

District map of Eastern Highlands Province

Gahuku Rural LLG is a local-level government (LLG) of Eastern Highlands Province, Papua New Guinea. The Alekano language, also known as Gahuku, is spoken in the LLG.

== Wards ==
- 01. Upper Yaukave
- 02. Lower Yaukave
- 03. Kami-Seigu
- 04. Kama
- 05. Fimito
- 06. Kotuni
- 07. Gahuku
- 08. Gehamo
