= Agarabi Rural LLG =

Local-level government in Papua New Guinea

- Location within Papua New Guinea
- Coordinates: 6.17°S 145.91°E
- Country: Papua New Guinea
- Province: Eastern Highlands Province
- Time zone: UTC+10 (AEST)

District map of Eastern Highlands Province

Agarabi Rural LLG is a local-level government (LLG) of Eastern Highlands Province, Papua New Guinea. The Agarabi language is spoken in the LLG.

== Wards ==
- 01. Ramu
- 02. Onkono
- 03. Aubana
- 04. Pakino
- 05. Anonapa
- 06. Akuitenu
- 07. Anawa-Yonki
- 08. Yonki No. 1
