= Isabi language =

Papuan language

Isabi
- Native to: Papua New Guinea
- Region: Madang Province
- Native speakers: (280 cited 1981)
- Language family: Trans–New Guinea: Kainantu–Goroka; Goroka; Gende–Isabi; Isabi

Language codes
- ISO 639-3: isa
- Glottolog: isab1240

Isabi (Maruhia) is a Papuan language spoken in Madang Province, Papua New Guinea.
