= Siane Rural LLG =

Local-level government in Papua New Guinea

- Country: Papua New Guinea
- Province: Chimbu Province
- Time zone: UTC+10 (AEST)

Siane Rural LLG is a local-level government (LLG) of Chimbu Province, Papua New Guinea. The Siane language is spoken in the LLG.

== Wards ==
1. Kereku
2. Waisime
3. Murefagu
4. Marefagu
5. Nime-Kaupa
6. Mi-Fokowe
7. Kumogu
8. Atinogu
9. Irafaiufa
10. Komuni No. 1
11. Famundi
12. Seine
13. Rabiufa
14. Rumbuiufa
15. Andomono
16. Feremena
17. Wafo
18. Lofaifo
19. Loanoi
20. Nomanena
21. Kemami
22. Nomane
23. Norifo
24. Komborufa
25. Foinawa
26. Komni No. 2
27. Kifiufa
