= Benabena language =

Kainantu–Gorokan language of Papua New Guinea

Benabena
- Native to: Papua New Guinea
- Region: Goroka District, Eastern Highlands Province
- Native speakers: (45,000 cited 2000 census)
- Language family: Trans–New Guinea: Kainantu–Goroka; Goroka; Benabena

Language codes
- ISO 639-3: bef
- Glottolog: bena1264

Benabena (Bena) is a Papuan language spoken in the Goroka District of Eastern Highlands Province, Papua New Guinea.

== Phonology ==
=== Vowels ===
	Front	Back
Close	i	u
Mid	e	o
Open	a	

- Vowel sounds /i, e, a, o, u/ can also be heard as [ɪ, ɛ, ʌ, ɔ, ʊ] in word-initial or word-medial positions.

=== Consonants ===
	Bilabial	Labio- dental	Alveolar	Retroflex	Palatal	Velar	Glottal
Nasal	m		n				
Stop	p		t			k	ʔ
Fricative	β	f	s		ʝ	ɣ	h
Approximant				ɭ			

- /p, t, k/ can be heard as aspirated [pʰ, tʰ, kʰ] in syllable-initial position, and can be heard as unreleased as [p̚, t̚, k̚] when preceding a consonant.
- /β/ can be heard as a stop [b] in word-initial position, and also may rarely fluctuate with a glide [w].
- /ʝ/ can be heard as a glide [j] in stressed syllable word-initial position and can be heard as [z] in word-initial unstressed syllable position.
- /s/ can be heard as [ʃ] before high vowels /i, u/.
- /ɣ/ can be heard as [ɡ] in free variation among speakers.
- /ɭ/ can be heard as a tap [ɽ] in free variation.
