= Keyagana language =

Goroka language spoken in Papua New Guinea

Keyagana
- Native to: Papua New Guinea
- Region: Eastern Highlands Province
- Native speakers: (12,000 cited 1981)
- Language family: Trans–New Guinea: Kainantu–Goroka; Goroka; Kamono–Yagaria; Keyagana

Language codes
- ISO 639-3: kyg
- Glottolog: keya1238

Keyagana (Ke’yagana) is a Papuan language spoken in Eastern Highlands Province, Papua New Guinea.
