= Fore language =

Kainantu-Goroka language of Papua New Guinea

Fore
- Native to: Papua New Guinea
- Region: Goroka District, Eastern Highlands Province
- Ethnicity: Fore
- Native speakers: (30,000 cited 2000)
- Language family: Trans–New Guinea: Kainantu–Goroka; Goroka; Fore
- Dialects: Pamusa

Language codes
- ISO 639-3: for
- Glottolog: fore1270

Fore or Foré (/ˈfɔːreɪ/ FOR-ay) is a Kainantu-Goroka language spoken in the Goroka District of Eastern Highlands Province, Papua New Guinea.

== Phonology ==
The consonants of Fore are as follows:

		Bilabial	Dental/Alveolar	Palatal	Velar	Glottal
Stops	Plain	p	t̪		k	ʔ
Stops	Prenasalized	ᵐp	ⁿ̪t̪~ⁿt		ᵑk	
Nasals		m	n̪~n			
Fricative			s̪~s			
Approximants		w		j		

All the dental consonants can vary to alveolar, except /t̪/ which is always dental. /p/, /t̪/, and /k/ are pronounced as /b~β/, /ɾ~l/, and /g~ɣ/ between vowels, and /p~ɸ/, /t̪~t/, /k~x/ word initially/. Velar consonants are labialized after rounded vowels. /j/ is often pronounced as a fricative /ʝ/.

Fore has six vowels:

	Front	Central	Back
Close	i		u
Mid	eː	ʌ	oː
Open		aː	

It also has four diphthongs: ae, ao, ai, and au.

Fore has a pitch accent system. Each syllable is either accented or unaccented. Multiple accented syllables can occur in the same word.
