= Usarufa language =

Language of Papua New Guinea

Usarufa
- Region: Okapa District, Eastern Highlands Province, Papua New Guinea
- Native speakers: (1,300 cited 1996)
- Language family: Trans–New Guinea: Kainantu–Goroka; Kainantu; Gauwa; Usarufa

Language codes
- ISO 639-3: usa
- Glottolog: usar1243
- Imikori Village, from Moife Hill

Usarufa is a Kainantu language spoken by the people of the same name in Papua New Guinea. It belongs to the Gauwa branch of the Kainantu family of the Kainantu–Goroka languages. The language area consists of six villages: Moife, Imikori, Irafo, Kagu, Agura 1, and Agura 2. Its ISO 639 code is usa.

As of 2009, the language was reported to have had about 1,200 speakers and no fluent speakers below the age of 25, which makes it an endangered language.

== Phonology ==
This section is derived from the analyses presented in Bee 1965 in which an inventory of eighteen consonants is favoured.

Usarufa consonant phonemes
		Labial	Alveolar	Palatal	Velar	Glottal
Plosive	plain	p	t		k	ʔ
Plosive	glottalised	ˀp	ˀt		ˀk	ʔ
Nasal	plain	m	n			
Nasal	glottalised	ˀm	ˀn			
Nasal	geminate	mː	nː			
Approximant	plain	w	ɾ	j		
Approximant	glottalised	ˀw		ˀj		

The distribution of these consonants is determined by their position within a stress group, a segment which has one primary stress, the placement of which is determined by a pitch contour. This stress group may consist of two or more syllables. Only /p t k m n w j/ can occur as the onset of a stress group, and only /ʔ/ can occur finally. In stress-medial position all consonant phonemes can occur, and /p k/ are realised as [β] and [ɣ], respectively. /ɾ/ may be realised as [ɺ].

An alternative analysis treats all glottalised and geminate consonants as secondary, in which case there are only nine consonant phonemes:

Usarufa consonant phonemes, alternative analysis
	Labial	Alveolar	Palatal	Velar	Glottal
Plosive	p	t		k	ʔ
Nasal	m	n			
Approximant	w	r	j		

Usarufa has an unremarkable five-vowel system.

Usarufa vowel phonemes
	Front	Central	Back
Close	i		u
Mid	e		o
Open		a	

/i/, /e/, and /a/ have the allophones [ɪ], [ɛ] and [ʌ], respectively. /e/ may be realised as [ɪ] following coronal or palatal phonemes.

== See also ==
- Vida Chenoweth, who studied the Usarufa music
- Aikuma, mobile software for language recording, first used to record Usarufa
