= Siane language =

Papuan language of Papua New Guinea

Siane
- Native to: Papua New Guinea
- Region: Chimbu Province, Eastern Highlands Province
- Native speakers: (29,000 cited 2000 census)
- Language family: Trans–New Guinea: Kainantu–Goroka; Goroka; Siane

Language codes
- ISO 639-3: snp
- Glottolog: sian1257

Siane (Siani) is a Papuan language spoken in the eastern highlands of Papua New Guinea. It is spoken in Siane Rural LLG and other neighbouring local-level government areas of Papua New Guinea.

Named dialects are Hakoa, Kolepa, Yamofowe, Komongu, Komoigaleka, Kemanimowe, Ona, Keto, Laiya, Fowe, Olumba, Lambau, Alango, Yandime, Wando. Komongu and Lambau are the literary standards.

Like many Papuan languages, Siane has a register tone system.

== Phonology ==
=== Vowels ===
	Front	Back
Close	i	u
Mid	e	o
Open		ɑ

=== Consonants ===
		Bilabial	Alveolar	Dorsal
Nasal		m	n	
Stop	voiceless	p	t	k
Stop	prenasalized	ᵐb	ⁿd	ᵑg
Fricative		f	s	
Sonorant		w	ɾ	j
