= Aikuma =

Speech recording collection app

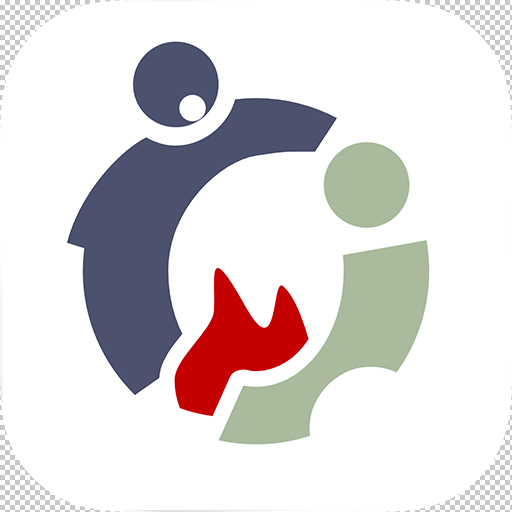

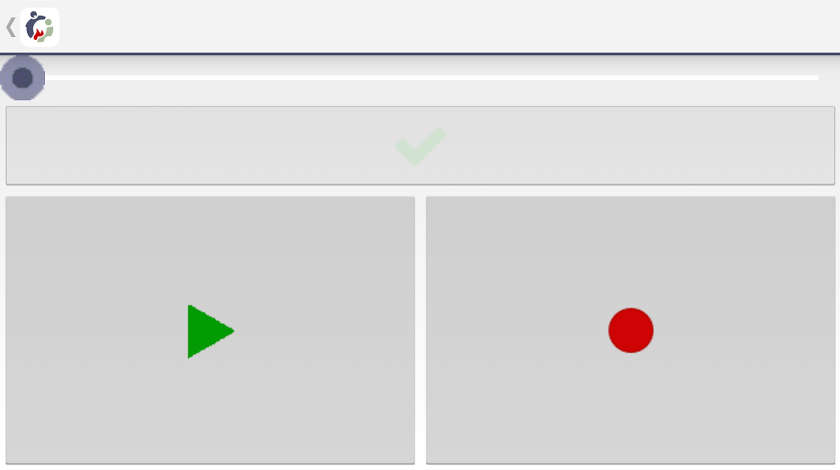
- Aikuma
- Original authors: Steven Bird, Florian Hanke
- Developer: The Aikuma Development Team
- Release: March 2013; 13 years ago
- Preview release: 0.8
- Written in: Java
- Operating system: Android
- License: Apache License
- Website: aikuma.org
- Repository: github.com/aikuma/aikuma

Aikuma is an Android app for collecting speech recordings with time-aligned translations. The app includes a text-free interface for consecutive interpretation, designed for users who are not literate. The Aikuma won Grand Prize in the Open Source Software World Challenge (2013).

== Name ==
Aikuma means "meeting place" in Usarufa, a Papuan language where this software was first used in 2012.

== History ==
Aikuma was developed with sponsorship from the National Science Foundation, including a $101,501 (US) project, "to use mobile telephones to collect larger amounts of data on undocumented endangered languages than would never be possible through usual fieldwork."

Aikuma and its modified version (Lig-Aikuma) have been used for collecting substantial quantities of audio in remote indigenous villages.

A modified version of the app, called Lig-Aikuma, has been developed at the Université Grenoble Alpes (LIG laboratory) and implements new features such as elicitation of speech from text, images and videos.

== Similar Software ==
Lingua Libre is an online collaborative project and tool by the Wikimedia France association, which can be used as a tool for Language Preservation. Lingua Libre enables to record words, phrases, or sentences of any language, oral (audio recording) or signed (video recording). It is a highly efficient method to record endangered languages since up to 1000 words can be recorded per hour. All the content is under Free License, and speakers of minority languages are encouraged to record their own dialects.
