= Agarabi language =

Kainantu language of Papua New Guinea

Agarabi
- Native to: Papua New Guinea
- Region: Eastern Highlands Province
- Native speakers: (27,000 cited 2000 census)
- Language family: Trans–New Guinea: Kainantu–Goroka; Kainantu; Gauwa; Agarabi

Language codes
- ISO 639-3: agd
- Glottolog: agar1252

Agarabi, also called Bare, is a Kainantu language spoken in Agarabi Rural LLG, Eastern Highlands Province, Papua New Guinea.

== Phonology ==
=== Consonants ===
	Labial	Alveolar	Palatal	Velar	Glottal
Nasal	m	n			ʔ
Plosive	p	t		k	
Rhotic		r			
Approximant	w		j		

- Sounds /p, t, k, w/ may fluctuate to fricative sounds [ɸ, s, x, β] when between oral vowels.
- Sounds /p, t/ may also be heard as voiced [b, d] within complex syllable nuclei.
- /n/ may be heard as [ŋ] when before /k/.
- /r/ can be heard as either a tap [ɾ] or a trill [r].
- /ʔ/ may occasionally fluctuate to a fricative [h].

=== Vowels ===
	Front	Central	Back
Close	i		u
Mid	e	(ə)	o
Open		a	

A lax /a/ is said to be heard as [ə].
