= Gende language =

Papuan language spoken in Papua New Guinea

Gende
- Native to: Papua New Guinea
- Region: Madang Province
- Native speakers: (3,000 cited 2000)
- Language family: Trans–New Guinea: Kainantu–Goroka; Goroka; Gende–Isabi; Gende

Language codes
- ISO 639-3: gaf
- Glottolog: gend1249

Gende (Gendeka, Gene; also Bundi) is a Papuan language spoken in Madang Province, Papua New Guinea.
