= Kenati language =

Unconfirmed language of Papua New Guinea

Kenati
- Region: Papua New Guinea
- Native speakers: 1000 (2004)
- Language family: Trans–New Guinea: Kainantu–Goroka; Kainantu; Kenati

Language codes
- ISO 639-3: gat
- Glottolog: kena1250

Kenati is a poorly documented Papuan language spoken by only about 950 people (in 1990) in Papua New Guinea. It is also known as Aziana, Ganati, Kenathi. Specifically, it is spoken in 3 villages located in Eastern Highlands Province, in Obura-Wonenara District of Papua New Guinea.

Wurm (1960, 1975) placed it in his East New Guinea Highlands family as an independent branch. Ross (2005) could not find enough evidence to confirm this, and left it unclassified. However, Ethnologue (2009) classified it more specifically with the Kainantu languages, another branch of Wurm's East Highlands.
