= Kanite language =

Papuan language of Papua New Guinea

Kanite
- Native to: Papua New Guinea
- Region: Eastern Highlands Province
- Native speakers: 9,300 (2019)
- Language family: Trans–New Guinea: Kainantu–Goroka; Goroka; Kamono–Yagaria; Kanite

Language codes
- ISO 639-3: kmu
- Glottolog: kani1286

Kanite is a Papuan language spoken in Eastern Highlands Province, Papua New Guinea, with a few thousand speakers. One of its dialects is Kagufi.

== Grammatical summary ==
Kanite words are divided into three classes:

- Nominal: Words in non-verb phrases with mood suffixes
- Verbal: Words in verb phrases with mood suffixes
- Auxiliary: Words with no mood suffixes

== Bibliography ==
- Gibson, Gwen; McCarthy, Joy (1992), Kanite Organised Phonology Data (PDF), SIL Global
- Gibson, Gwen; McCarthy, Joy (2002) [1967], Kanite Grammar Sketch (PDF), SIL Global
