= Kambaira language =

Kainantu language of Papua New Guinea

Kambaira
- Native to: Papua New Guinea
- Region: Eastern Highlands Province
- Native speakers: 16,000 (2003)
- Language family: Trans–New Guinea: Kainantu–Goroka; Kainantu; Tairora; Kambaira

Language codes
- ISO 639-3: kyy
- Glottolog: kamb1303
- ELP: Kambaira

Kambaira is a Kainantu language of Papua New Guinea.
