= Waffa language =

Kainantu language of Papua New Guinea

Waffa
- Native to: Papua New Guinea
- Region: Eastern Highlands Province
- Native speakers: (1,990 cited 2000)
- Language family: Trans–New Guinea: Kainantu–Goroka; Kainantu; Tairora; Waffa

Language codes
- ISO 639-3: waj
- Glottolog: waff1241

Waffa is a Kainantu language of Papua New Guinea.
