= Awiyaana language =

Kainantu language of Papua New Guinea

Awiyaana
- Auyana
- Native to: Papua New Guinea
- Region: Eastern Highlands Province
- Native speakers: (11,000 cited 2000)
- Language family: Trans–New Guinea: Kainantu–Goroka; Kainantu; Gauwa; Awiyaana

Language codes
- ISO 639-3: auy
- Glottolog: awiy1238

Awiyaana (Auyana) is a Kainantu language of Papua New Guinea.
