= Oweina language =

Kainantu language spoken in Papua New Guinea

Oweina
- Waisara
- Native to: Papua New Guinea
- Region: Eastern Highlands Province
- Native speakers: (640 cited 2000)
- Language family: Trans–New Guinea: Kainantu–Goroka; Kainantu; Gauwa; Oweina

Language codes
- ISO 639-3: wsr
- Glottolog: owen1244

Oweina (Owena, often misspelled "Owenia"), or Waisara, after the two villages in which it is spoken, is a Kainantu language of Papua New Guinea.
