= Kosena language =

Kainantu language of Papua New Guinea

Kosena
- Native to: Papua New Guinea
- Region: Eastern Highlands Province
- Native speakers: (2,780 cited 2000)
- Language family: Trans–New Guinea: Kainantu–Goroka; Kainantu; Gauwa; Kosena

Language codes
- ISO 639-3: kze
- Glottolog: kose1239

Kosena is a Kainantu language of Papua New Guinea.

== Phonology ==
=== Consonants ===
Consonants of Kosena
	Labial	Alveolar	Palatal	Velar	Glottal
Nasal	m	n		(ŋ)	
Stop	p	t		k g	ʔ
Tap		ɾ			
Fricative	f (β)	s			
Approximant	w		j		

=== Vowels ===
Vowels of Kosena
	Front	Back
High	i	u
Mid	e (eː)	o (oː)
Open-Mid		ʌ (ʌː)
