= Tokano language =

Trans–New Guinea language spoken in Papua New Guinea

Tokano
- Native to: Papua New Guinea
- Region: Lower Asaro Rural LLG, Goroka District, Eastern Highlands Province
- Native speakers: (6,000 cited 1982)
- Language family: Trans–New Guinea: Kainantu–Goroka; Goroka; Gahuku; Tokano
- Dialects: Lower Asaro; Zuhuzuho
- Writing system: Latin

Language codes
- ISO 639-3: zuh
- Glottolog: toka1244

Tokano is a Trans–New Guinea language spoken by approximately 6,000 people in Lower Asaro Rural LLG, Eastern Highlands Province, Papua New Guinea. It is also known as Gamuso, Tokama, Yufiyufa, Zaka, Zuhozuho, and Zuhuzuho.

There are currently few publications. A collection of folk tales translated by John Guhise was produced by SIL in 1977, and there are also portions of the Bible available in Tokano.
