= Yaweyuha language =

Goroka language spoken in Papua New Guinea

Yaweyuha
- Native to: Papua New Guinea
- Region: Eastern Highlands Province
- Native speakers: (2,000 cited 1991)
- Language family: Trans–New Guinea: Kainantu–Goroka; Goroka; Yaweyuha

Language codes
- ISO 639-3: yby
- Glottolog: yawe1241

Yaweyuha (Yabiyufa) is a Papuan language spoken in the eastern highlands of Papua New Guinea, and it is spoken by around 4,600 people.
