= Inoke language =

Papuan language

Inoke
- Yate
- Native to: Papua New Guinea
- Region: Eastern Highlands Province
- Native speakers: (10,000 cited 1993)
- Language family: Trans–New Guinea: Kainantu–Goroka; Goroka; Kamono–Yagaria; Inoke

Language codes
- ISO 639-3: ino
- Glottolog: inok1238

Inoke, or Yate (Jate), is a Papuan language spoken in Eastern Highlands Province, Papua New Guinea.
