= Tairora language =

Kainantu language spoken in Papua New Guinea

Tairoa
- Native to: Papua New Guinea
- Region: Eastern Highlands Province
- Ethnicity: Tairora
- Native speakers: 13,000 (2003)
- Language family: Trans–New Guinea: Kainantu–Goroka; Kainantu; Tairoric; Tairoa

Language codes
- ISO 639-3: Either: tbg – North omw – South
- Glottolog: nort2920 North sout2943 South

Tairoa (Tairora) is a Kainantu language spoken in Papua New Guinea.

Tairoa proper, or North Tairoa, includes dialects Aantantara (Andandara), Arau-Varosia (Arau-Barosia), Arokaara, Saiqora (Sai’ora), Tairora.

South Tairoa, a.k.a. Omwunra-Toqura, has dialects Aatasaara (Atakara), Haaviqinra-Oraura (Habina-Oraura), Omwunra-Toqura (Obura-To’okena), Vaira-Ntosara (Baira), Veqaura (Meauna), Vinaata-Konkompira (Pinata-Konkombira).
