= Awa language (Papua New Guinea) =

Kainantu language of Papua New Guinea

Awa
- Native to: Papua New Guinea
- Region: Eastern Highlands Province
- Native speakers: 2,100 (2003)
- Language family: Trans–New Guinea: Kainantu–Goroka; Kainantu; Gauwa; Awa

Language codes
- ISO 639-3: awb
- Glottolog: awap1236

Awa is a Kainantu language of Papua New Guinea.

== Phonology ==
=== Consonants ===
Consonant phonemes
	Bilabial		Alveolar		Palatal	Velar		Glottal
Nasal		m		n				
Stop	p	b	t			k	g	ʔ
Affricate			t̪s					
Approximant					j	w		
Trill				r				

=== Vowels ===
	Front	Central	Back
High	i		u
Mid	e	ə	o
Low	æ		ɑ

=== Allophones ===
- /p/, /t/, and /k/ are [β], [ɾ], and [ɣ] intervocalically after mid and back vowels
- /r/ is [d] following the vowel [i], and [r] elsewhere
- /t̪s/ is voiced [d̪z] after a nasal consonant
- /j/ may be pronounced [z]

=== Phonotactics ===
- Syllables follow the structure (C)V(C)
- The phonemes /b/, /g/, /r/, and /j/ do not occur word initially
- /ʔ/ is the only consonant occurring word finally

=== Tone ===
- Awa has the high, low, rising, and falling tonemes
