= Gadsup language =

Language

Gadsup
- Native to: Papua New Guinea
- Region: Eastern Highlands Province
- Ethnicity: Gadsup
- Native speakers: (25,000 cited 1996 – 2000 census)
- Language family: Trans–New Guinea: Kainantu–Goroka; Kainantu; Gauwa; Gadsup
- Dialects: Oyana, Akuna, Ontenu

Language codes
- ISO 639-3: gaj – inclusive code Individual code: ont – Ontenu village
- Glottolog: gads1258

Gadsup is a Kainantu language spoken by the people of the same name in Papua New Guinea.

== Phonology ==
Below are all the consonant phones found in both dialects. They can be organized in heterogeneous groups based on their phonological behavior.

| | | Bilabial | Alveolar | Palatal | Velar | Glottal |
|---|---|---|---|---|---|---|
| Nasal | | m | n | | | |
| Plosive | voiceless | p | t | | k | ʔ |
| Plosive | voiced | b | d | | | |
| Fricative | voiceless | ɸ | s | | x | |
| Fricative | voiced | β | | | | |
| Approximant | | | | j | | |
| Tap | | | ɾ | | | |

=== Ontena dialect ===
==== Consonants ====
Ontena Gadsup features an unusual form of allophony where the underlying phoneme is a continuant and only surfaces as a plosive in specific environments. It may therefore be analyzed as lacking oral plosive phonemes, something previously thought to be impossible; a similar phenomenon can be observed in Kabyle.

| | | Bilabial | Alveolar | Dorsal | Glottal |
|---|---|---|---|---|---|
| Group 1 | voiceless | ɸ | s | x | |
| Group 1 | voiced | β | ɾ | | |
| Group 2 | | m | n | j | ʔ |

- /ɸ β s ɾ x/ become [p b t d k] after /m n ʔ/, but initially and medially they are [ɸ β s ɾ x].

==== Vowels ====
| | Front | Central | Back |
|---|---|---|---|
| Close | i | | u |
| Mid | e | ɐ | o |
| Open | | a | |

- /ɐ/ can also be heard as [ʌ̈].

=== Akuna dialect ===
==== Consonants ====
| | | Bilabial | Alveolar | Dorsal | Glottal |
|---|---|---|---|---|---|
| Group 1 | voiceless | p | t | k | |
| Group 1 | voiced | β | d | | |
| Group 2 | | m | n | j | ʔ |

- Unlike in the Ontena dialect, /p t d k/ do not lenite initially, but they do medially.

==== Vowels ====
| | Front | Central | Back |
|---|---|---|---|
| Close | i | | u |
| Mid | e | | o |
| Open | æ | a | |

== Bibliography ==
- "Organised Phonology Data: Gadsup (Ontena dialect) Language [GAJ], Eastern Highlands Province" (PDF). sil.org. 2004-08-23. Archived from the original (PDF) on 2022-03-08.
- "Organised Phonology Data: Gadsup (Akuna dialect) Language [GAJ], Eastern Highlands Province" (PDF). sil.org. 2011-09-13.
- Frantz, Chester I.; Frantz, Marjorie E. (1966). "Gadsup phoneme and toneme units". Papers in New Guinea Linguistics No. 5. Canberra: Australian National University. doi:10.15144/PL-A7.1. ISBN 0-85883-012-4.
- Ulfsbjorninn, Shanti; Lahrouchi, Mohamed (2016). "The typology of the distribution of Edge: The propensity for bipositionality". Papers in Historical Phonology. 1: 109. doi:10.2218/pihph.1.2016.1696.
