= Upper Asaro Rural LLG =

Local-level government in Papua New Guinea

- Country: Papua New Guinea
- Province: Eastern Highlands Province
- Time zone: UTC+10 (AEST)

District map of Eastern Highlands Province

Upper Asaro Rural LLG is a local-level government (LLG) of Eastern Highlands Province, Papua New Guinea. The Dano language, also known as Upper Asaro, is spoken in the LLG.

== Wards ==
- 01. Anengu
- 02. Kombiangu/Amaiufa
- 03. Namta
- 04. Pikosa
- 05. Aneguyufa
- 06. Kwonggi No. 1
- 07. Kwonggi No. 2
- 08. Wesan
