= Lower Asaro Rural LLG =

Local-level government in Papua New Guinea

- Location within Papua New Guinea
- Coordinates: 6.007697°S 145.308693°E
- Country: Papua New Guinea
- Province: Eastern Highlands Province
- Time zone: UTC+10 (AEST)

District map of Eastern Highlands Province

Lower Asaro Rural LLG is a local-level government (LLG) of Eastern Highlands Province, Papua New Guinea. The Tokano language is spoken in the LLG.

== Wards ==
- 01. Mando-Yamayufa
- 02. Korepa
- 03. Asaro No. 1
- 04. Asaro No. 2
- 05. Tafeto/Wantrifu
- 06. Gamiyuho
- 07. Lunumbeyuho
- 08. Kanosa
- 09. Kofena
