= Dano language =

Papuan language of Papua New Guinea

Dano
- Native to: Papua New Guinea
- Region: Goroka District, Eastern Highlands Province
- Native speakers: (30,000 cited 1987)
- Language family: Trans–New Guinea: Kainantu–Goroka; Goroka; Gahuku; Dano
- Writing system: Latin

Language codes
- ISO 639-3: aso
- Glottolog: dano1240

Dano (Upper Asaro) is a Papuan language spoken by about 30,000 people in Upper Asaro Rural LLG, Eastern Highlands Province, Papua New Guinea.

== Phonology ==
Consonants
		Labial	Alveolar	Dorsal	Glottal
Plosive	voiceless	p	t	k	ʔ
Plosive	prenasal	ᵐb	ⁿd	ᵑɡ	
Fricative	voiceless	(ɸ)	s		h
Fricative	voiced	β	z	ɣ	
Nasal		m	n		
Approximant			l	(j)	
Flap			(ɺ)		

- /z, h/ can be pronounced as either [j, ɸ].
- /β, ɣ/ can be palatalized [ʲ] when before back vowels.
- /l/ can also commonly be heard as an alveolar flap [ɺ].
- /ⁿd/ can also be heard as a prenasal dental [ⁿ̪d̪].

Vowels
	Front	Central	Back
High	i		u
Mid	e		o
Low		a	
