= Yagaria language =

Papuan language of Papua New Guinea

Yagaria
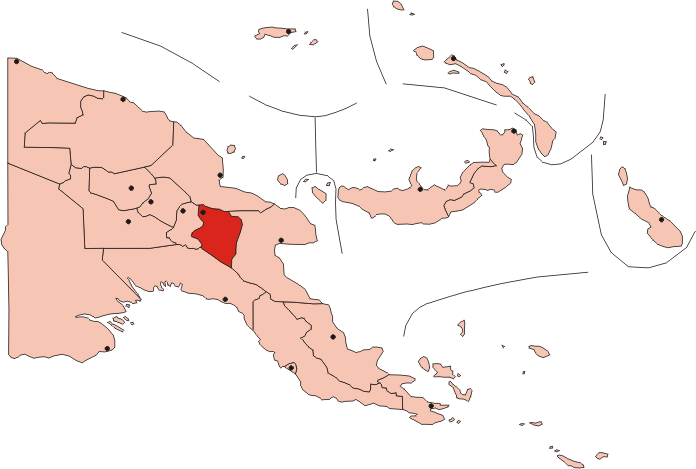
- Native to: Papua New Guinea
- Region: Yagaria Rural LLG, Goroka District, Eastern Highlands Province
- Native speakers: (38,000 cited 2000)
- Language family: Trans–New Guinea: Kainantu–Goroka; Goroka; Kamono–Yagaria; Yagaria

Language codes
- ISO 639-3: ygr
- Glottolog: yaga1260

Yagaria is a Papuan language spoken in the Goroka District of Eastern Highlands Province, Papua New Guinea. Named dialects are Kami-Kulaka, Move, Ologuti, Dagenava, Kamate, Hira, Hua (Huva) and Kotom. Yagaria has a total number of 21,116 speakers.

== History and culture ==
The Yagaria people live in low areas about 1,400 meters (4,500 ft.) above sea level with a warm and dry climate around Kami and Gotomi. They practice substance agriculture and live in small hamlets where their population is barely 400 people for each clan. They harvest and plant sweet potatoes, taro, yams, sugarcane, bananas, beans, "pitpit", and different types of spinach. They domesticated pigs, dogs, and chickens. Their diets are usually sweet potatoes, marsupials and birds. When coffee plantations were introduced in the late fifties, cash profit changed most of the Yagaria lifestyle. Now rice, tinned meats and fish, and other food items are easy to find in their stores. Men wear European clothes while most women still wear traditional clothing.

== Dialects ==
Yagaria consists of eight main dialects.

Dialect Name	Number of speakers
Dagenava	373
Move	4,519
Kamate	2,369
Ologuti	2,165
Gotomi	2,032
Kani-Kuluka	4,469
Hira	2,318
Huva	2,871

== Phonology ==
=== Vowels ===
Yagaria vowels
	Front	Central	Back
Close	i		u
Mid	ɛ		o
Open		a	ɑ
Diphthong	/ɛi, ou, ɑɛ, ɑo/		

- /i/ - Voiced high close unrounded front vocoid occurring word initially, medially, and finally
- /ɛ/ - Voiced mid open unrounded front vocoid gliding to high close unrounded front, occurring word initially, medially, and finally
- /$\varepsilon^i$/ - Voiced mid open unrounded front vocoid gliding to high close unrounded front, occurring word initially, medially, and finally
- /u/ - Voiced high close rounded back vocoid occurring word initially, medially, and finally
- /o/ - Voiced mid close rounded back vocoid occurring word initially, medially, and finally
- /$o^u$/ - Voiced mid close rounded back vocoid gliding to high close rounded back, occurring word initially, medially, and finally
- /a/ - Voiced low open unrounded central vocoid occurring word initially, medially, and finally
- /$a^\varepsilon$/ - Voiced unrounded central-front
- /$a^o$/ - Voiced central-back

=== Consonants ===
Yagaria consonants
		Bilabial	Alveolar	Palatal	Velar	Glottal
Stop	voiceless	p	t		k	ʔ
Stop	voiced	b	d		g	
Nasal		m	n			
Fricative		v	s			h
Continuant				j	ʟ	

==== Distribution of Phonemes ====
The syllable structure used in the Yagaria language is (C)V(ʔ). The four syllable patterns are V, CV, CVʔ, and Vʔ where CV is the most used.

== Morphology ==
=== Pronouns ===
Personal, Possessive, Emphatic, and Interrogative pronouns are used. Personal and Possessive pronouns happens in free word and affixed forms. Emphatic pronoun occurs in suffixes.

Singular
POV	Subject (Yagaria)	Subject (English)
1	dagaea	I
2	gagaea	you
3	agaea	he/she

Dual
POV	Subject (Yagaria)	Subject (English)
1	la'agaea	we
2	latagaea	you
3	tagaea	they

Plural
POV	Subject (Yagaria)	Subject (English)
1	lagaea	we
2	lapagaea	you
3	pagaea	they

Short Forms Open/Closed
Personal Pronouns	POV	Open	Closed	English
Singular	1	dagae	dagae'	I
Singular	2	gagae	gagae'	you
Singular	3	agae	agae'	he/she
Dual	1	la'agae	la'agae'	we
Dual	2	latagae	latagae'	you
Dual	3	tagae	tagae'	they
Plural	1	lagae	lagae'	we
Plural	2	lapagae	lapagae'	you
Plural	3	pagae	pagae'	they

=== Nouns ===
The main noun classes used in the Yagaria language are Class 1 and Class 2.

==== Class 1 ====
Nouns can indicate living and non-living objects. They occur in two forms, long-form where carrying suffix -na, and short-form where the suffix is removed and ends with a glottal stop. Long-form nouns are used less and mostly for citation, some as a subject, and mostly used in intransitive clauses.

Long Form	Short Form	Translation
ana	a'	women
yona	yo'	house
yana	ya'	taro
gokolena	gokole'	chicken

Examples of using Long forms

ba yana ege gilena
{sweet potato} taro banana corn
sweet potato taro banana corn

ana hoya no'-eli-e
woman work PROG-do-IND
the woman is working

Long forms as an object:

ve agaea ana eli-d-i-e
man he woman take-PAST-3.SG-IND
the man took the woman

Short forms as subject in intransitive clause and as an object:

faya' ni-pi' bei-d-i-e
fish water-IN live-PAST-3.SG-IND
there are fish in the water

yale pagaea yo' gi-d-a-e
people they house build-PAST-3.PL-IND
the people built a house

==== Class 2 ====
Class 2 nouns have some ending in -na, and is never omitted. Suffixation happens after that syllable.

Examples:

bina
price

bina-'a
price-ita
its price

Class 2 nouns that behave somewhat like class 1 nouns. They carry suffix -'na, has short form without ending in a glottal stop. All suffixation occurs with long form carrying the suffix -'na.

Examples:

dote'na
food

dote' yava laga-'a
edible tree fruit-its
edible tree-fruit

dote'na-ka no-k-am-u-e
food-your PROG-you-give-1.SG-IND
I am giving you your food

filite'na
death

filite' yale
dead people
dead people

filite'na-e' l-amota no'-ei-e
death-BEN us-fear IND
we are afraid of death

nalu-di
wife-my
my wife

da-nalu-di
my-wife-my
my wife

=== Adjectives ===
Yagaria has a distinction between primary and secondary adjectives. Primary adjectives are used to determine the morphological behavior of "adjectives". Secondary adjectives are obtained from nouns or verbs, or local or temporal expressions occurring as noun adjuncts.

==== Primary adjectives ====
Morphological pattern of class 1 nouns, and class 2 nouns are the two groups being used in the primary adjectives. Most adjectives have short or not-suffixed form for attributive occurrence, and long or suffixed form for predicative occurrence.

Class 1 examples
Adjectives following Class 1	Translation
haga'. / hagana	tasty
fagi' / faina	far
fate' / fatena	far
havá' / havána	unimportant
lava' / lavana	unimportant
lakoli' / lakolina	flat
bonu' / bouna	round
legi' / legina	true
havu' / havuna	uncultivated

Class 2 examples
Adjectives following Class 2	Translation
soko / sokona	good
feipa / feipana	bad
buko / bukona	warm
gata / gatana	heavy
hogo / hogona	short
hepa / hepana	bad
fotogo / fotogona	good

== Numerals ==
Numbers are made using a system of only one, two, and fives. The sum of numbers are usually expressed by hands and feet.

Number (English)	Number (Yagaria)
one	bogo
two	lole
three	lole-'e' bogo-'e'
four	lole-'e' lole-'e'
five	d- anita bogo-ko'
six	d- anita bogo-kayagati' bogo-ko'
seven	d- anita bogo-kayagati' lole
eight	d- anita bogo-kaygati' lole-'e' bogo-'e'
nine	d- anita bogo-kayagati' lole-'e' lole-'e'
ten	d- anita lole
eleven	d- anita su ho- na d- eiya -logati' bogo
twelve	d- anita su ho- na d- eiya -logati' lole
thirteen	d- anita su ho- na d- eiya -logati' lole-'e' bogo-'e'
fourteen	d- anita su ho- na d- eiya -logati' lole-'e' lole-'e'
fifteen	d- anita su ho- na d- eiya bogo-kayaga'a
sixteen	d- anita su ho- na d- eiya bogo-kayagati' bogo-ko'
seventeen	d- anita su ho- na d- eiya bogo-kayagati' lole
eighteen	d- anita su ho- na d- eiya bogo-kayagati' lole-'e' bogo-'e'
nineteen	d- anita su ho- na d- eiya bogo-kayagati' lole-'e' lole-'e'
twenty	d- eiya d- anita buki'a
