= List of schools in Papua New Guinea =

This is a list of notable schools in Papua New Guinea. This list includes primary schools, secondary schools, and university bodies, both public and private.

== Primary and Secondary education ==
- Aiyura National High School, Kainantu
- Kerevat National High School, Kerevat
- Passam National High School, Paliama
- Port Moresby International School, Port Moresby
- Port Moresby National High School, Port Moresby
- St. Joseph's International Catholic College, Boroko
- St. Joseph's School, Bougainville Island
- Sogeri National High School, Sogeri
- Ukarumpa International School, Ukarumpa
- Wawin National High School, Lae

== Universities and tertiary education ==
- Bulolo Forestry College, Bulolo
- Christian Leaders' Training College, Banz, Western Highlands
- Divine Word University, Madang
- IBSUniversity, Port Moresby
- Newton Theological College, Popondetta
- Pacific Adventist University, Boroko, NCD
- Papua New Guinea University of Natural Resources and Environment, Kerevat
- Papua New Guinea University of Technology, Lae
- Sonoma Adventist College, Kokopo
- University of Goroka, Goroka
- University of Papua New Guinea, Port Moresby
