= Kainantu Urban LLG =

Local-level government in Papua New Guinea

- Location within Papua New Guinea
- Coordinates: 6.291314°S 145.857476°E
- Country: Papua New Guinea
- Province: Eastern Highlands Province
- District: Kainantu District
- City: Kainantu
- Time zone: UTC+10 (AEST)

District map of Eastern Highlands Province

Kainantu Urban LLG is a local-level government (LLG) of Eastern Highlands Province, Papua New Guinea. Ukarumpa, an important SIL International base in Papua New Guinea, is located in the LLG.

== Wards ==
- 81. Kainantu Urban
- 82. Aiyura Urban
- 83. Ukarumpa S.I.L.
- 84. Yonki Township
