= Tairora =

Tairora may refer to:

- Tairora people
- Tairora language
