= Gadsup =

Gadsup may refer to:

- Gadsup people
- Gadsup language
