= St Joseph's School, Mabiri =

School in Papua New Guinea

Information
- Religious affiliation: Marist Brothers

St Joseph's School, Mabiri is a Marist Brothers school on Bougainville Island, the main island of the Autonomous Region of Bougainville of Papua New Guinea.

== Funding ==
The school receives funding from government and non-government organizations, including Australian Aid from Australia and other countries. They have also been helped by Australian Marist students and schools, including St Joseph's College, Hunters Hill and Champagnat Catholic College Pagewood.

== See also ==
- Catholic Church in Papua New Guinea
- Education in Papua New Guinea
- List of schools in Papua New Guinea
