= Ukarumpa =

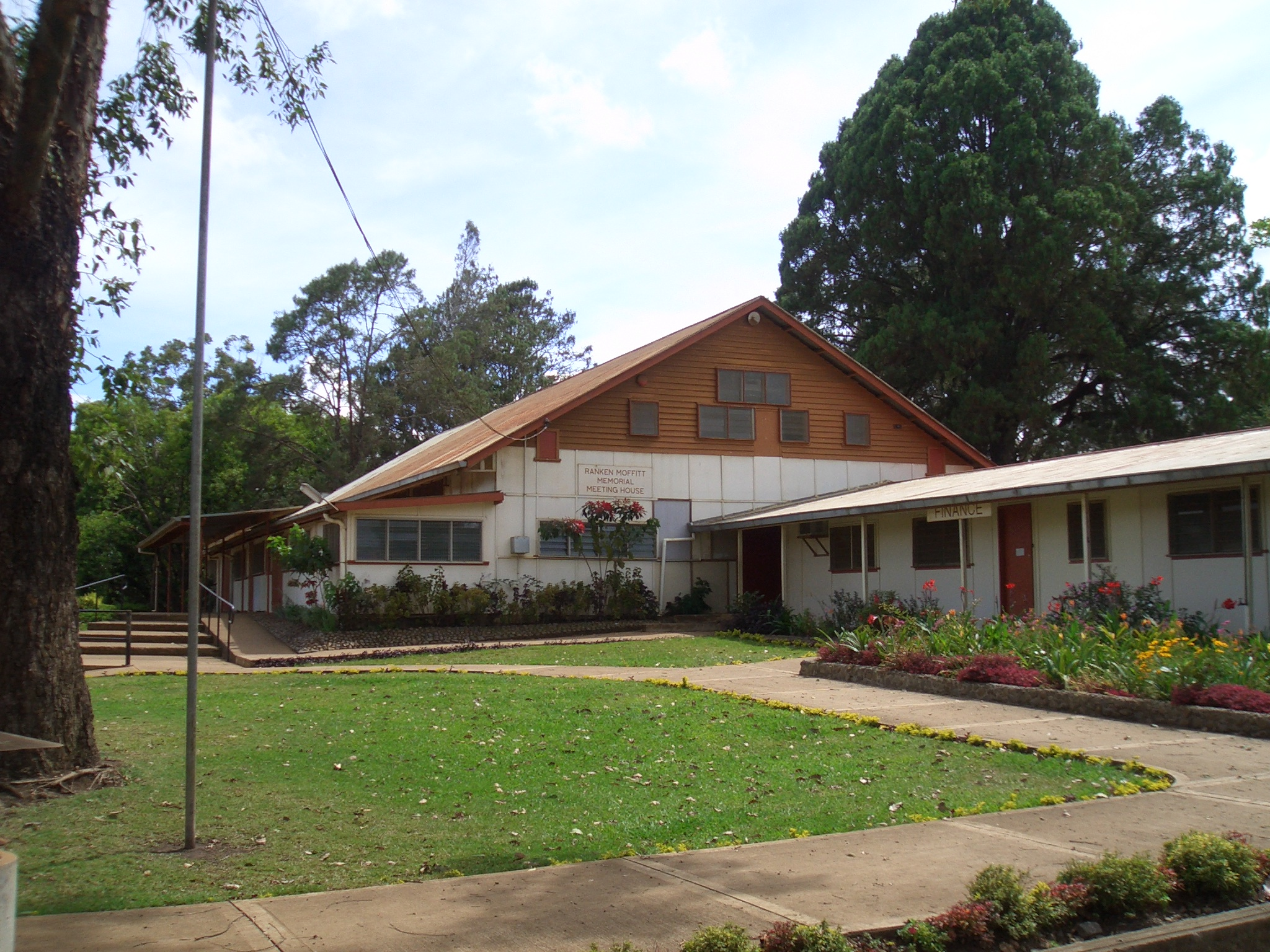
- Meeting house

- Location within Papua New Guinea
- Coordinates: 6°20′11.6″S 145°53′06.0″E
- Country: Papua New Guinea
- Province: Eastern Highlands
- District: Kainantu District
- LLG: Kainantu Urban LLG
- Established: 1956
- Elevation: 1,620 m (5,310 ft)

Population
  - Total: 600

Languages
  - Main languages: English, Tok Pisin, Gadsup, Tairora
- Time zone: UTC+10 (AEST)
- Location: 11 km (6.8 mi) from Kainantu
- Climate: Cfb

Ukarumpa is an intentional international community that is the main centre for SIL-PNG, located in the Eastern Highlands Province of Papua New Guinea. It lies approximately 11 kilometres (7 mi) by road from Kainantu in the Aiyura Valley. The population consists of a variety of paid staff and volunteer staff who live nearby. The centre was established in 1957. The current population is approximately 600. It is at an elevation of approximately 1600 m (5300 feet) above sea level.

== History ==
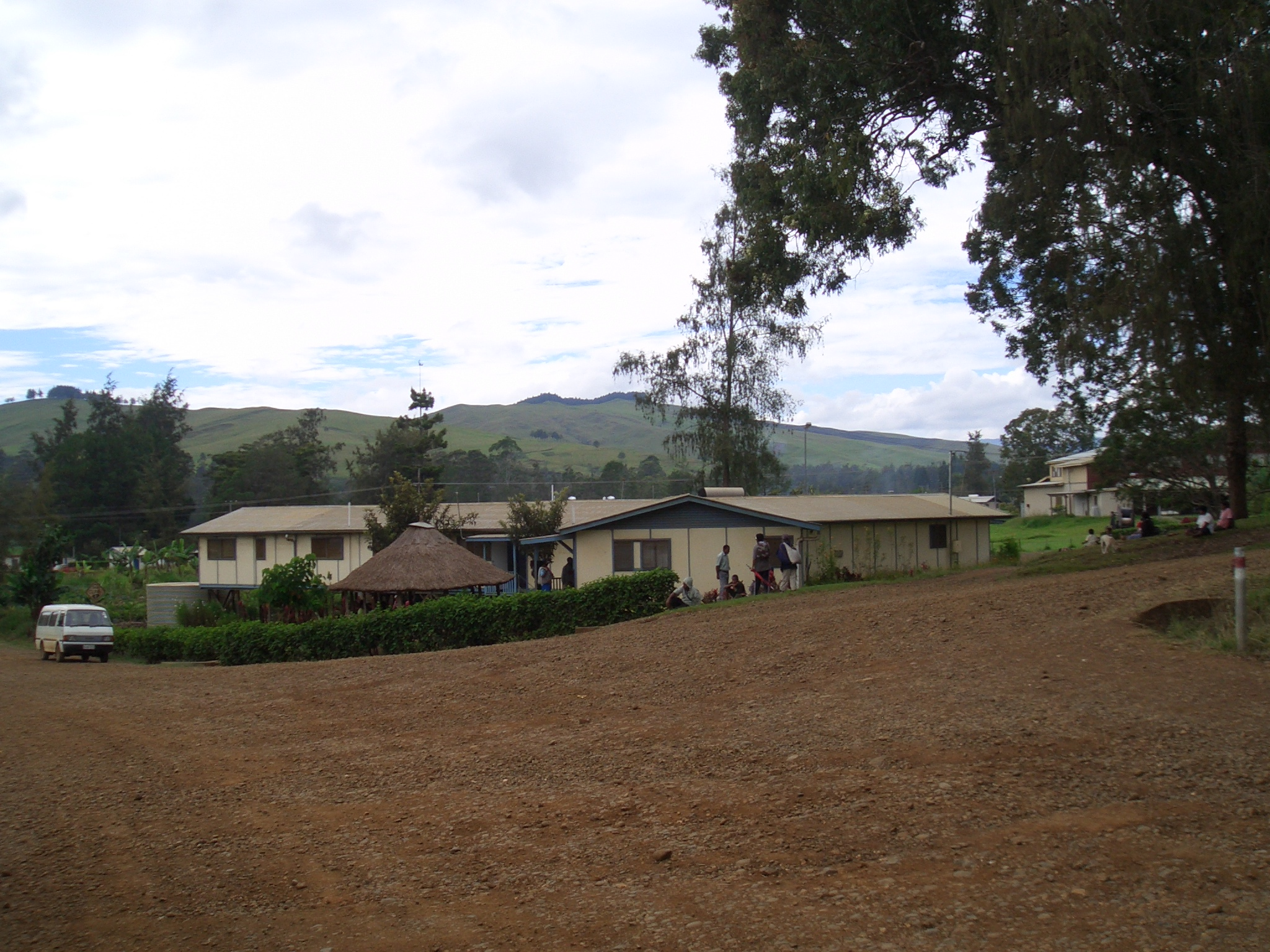
Medical clinic

The 99-year lease for the 500 acres (2.0 km^{2}) at Ukarumpa was signed by Dick Pittman, accompanied by founding Director, Dr. James C. ("Jim") Dean for the Summer Institute of Linguistics on 4 October 1956. Jim Dean was the founding Director of the Summer Institute of Linguistics in the (then) United Nations mandated Australian Trust Territory of New Guinea and remained as Director until he was reassigned to establish the S.I.L. operations in India in the mid-1960s.

The 500 acres (2.0 km^{2}) had been the Peacock Plantation, a failed commercial venture. Before that, however, it was a plot of land that was used as the tribal war lands of the nearby tribes (and traditional enemies), the Gadsup and Tairora. Because the land was vacant in the mid-1950s, and only a portion of it, near the Ba'e river, was suitable for gardens, the Australian administrators offered it as one of several potential sites for the SIL base of operations.

Originally the land was open kunai (a type of waist-high grass with sharp-edged leaves) with few trees and no development. The members built homes and planted trees which continue to attract bird life. Most of the buildings and roads were built by missionary volunteers with financial support from churches and individuals in their home countries.

The function of Ukarumpa is to serve as an operations base for translators, linguists, literacy specialists, teachers and other professionals, who are mainly volunteer workers with SIL. SIL International is an organisation that places a strong emphasis on linguistic research and Bible translation.

== Geography ==
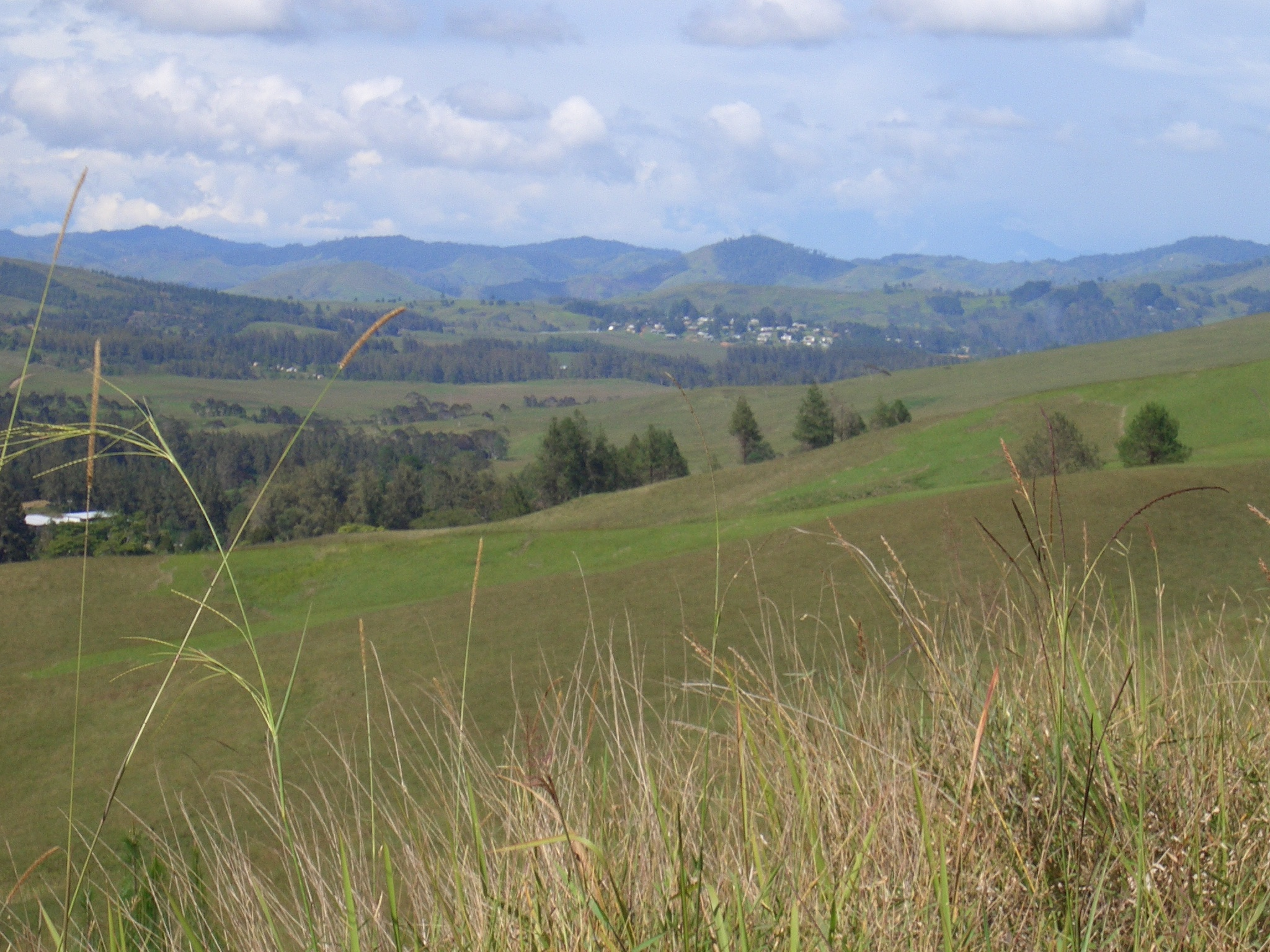
Ukarumpa viewed from the "Lone Tree Hill"

Ukarumpa is located on the Ba'e River. The Ba'e originates upstream from Ukarumpa and runs through the Gadsup area on to Kainantu, where it joins the Ramu River. It lies at an altitude of approximately 1,620 metres (5,300 ft). The climate is Equatorial Highland; there are cool days and nights, with daily afternoon rains between November and March.

The flora are primarily evergreen trees (Pine, Eucalyptus, Casuarina); there are also coffee plantations nearby, and kunai grass-covered hills.

== Infrastructure ==
=== Airstrip ===
Ukarumpa has its own air strip located about a mile outside the compound which is home to a fleet of four Kodiak aircraft and two helicopters operated by JAARS and SIL.

=== Store ===
A store run by SIL is the missionaries' source of most general goods like food, toiletries, and office supplies. The store is open to both SIL members as well as non-members although members are granted a 10% discount on all items at the store.

=== School ===
Ukarumpa has a primary school and a secondary school within the compound to provide good education to the children of the missionaries.

Castle

Ukarumpa has a large castle, similar in design to Scottish castles.

Business

Wades' Cakes and the Paine Corporation are located in Ukarumpa.

== See also ==
- Ukarumpa International School
- Aiyura Airport
