= Ukarumpa International School =

School in Ukarumpa, Papua New Guinea

Location
- Ukarumpa, Eastern Highlands; Papua New Guinea; 6.3358°S 145.8862°E

Information
- Former name: Ukarumpa High School
- Type: International school
- Religious affiliation: Christian
- Established: 1962; 64 years ago
- Grades: Preschool–Grade 12
- Enrollment: Approximately 225
- Accreditation: Western Association of Schools and Colleges
- Website: ukarumpainternationalschool.org

Ukarumpa International School is an accredited PreK-12 school in Ukarumpa, Papua New Guinea.

== Accreditations and recognitions ==
- Sponsored by the Summer Institute of Linguistics
- Accredited by the Western Association of Schools and Colleges, USA.
- Recognised by the Department of Education, Papua New Guinea.
- Established examining centre for the University of London, UK.
- Pre-school ulkomaankoulu, Finland
- The Papua New Guinea National Department of Education approves the school for instruction *through the School Certificate (Year 10).

== History ==
Throughout the history of the school there has been an emphasis on preparing students for re-entry into their home country education systems. This has led to a steady broadening of the curriculum and the inclusion of Mother Tongue Studies when needed and staffing permitted.

In 1962, the high school began with five pupils, from Canada and the US, and three teachers. The students did correspondence lessons from Blackfriars in NSW Australia. The building was a 10-foot by 12-foot bamboo walled building situated on the "Circle' near Lovings and Vincents houses. In 1963 the first permanent building was built on the present site of the school and the pupils grew in number to 13, some came from Kainantu and Aiyura. The original school building was used as a place to store sports equipment for a number of years.

In 1996 the primary and secondary campuses were incorporated into one school to facilitate a K- 12 curriculum under the common name of Ukarumpa International School. Ukarumpa International School has served a student body of approximately 175 in Kindergarten through grade 6 and approximately 180 in 7–12. However, student and staff population fluctuates with the coming and going of missionaries each year. In 2010, the school yearbook, The Silhouette, recorded a population of 258 students and 77 staff. Approximately 80% of the students are children of members or area mission groups. There are 15 nationalities represented in the school with the majority being students from North America.

In 1997 a Finnish School (Ukarumpan Suomalainen Ulkomaankoulu, USKO) was established with 11 students.

In July 2003 the primary campus was relocated into the centre, away from the Aiyura airport.

In 2017, the sixth grade was relocated from the primary campus to the secondary campus.

== Teachers ==
The 50+ teachers come from many countries. They allow home schooling families at Ukarumpa and allow them to participate in school programs along with their peers.

== Primary school ==
In July 2003, the primary campus (Grades 1–6) moved to their new campus on the Centre from the old campus about 3 kilometers away. Facilities on the campus include eight classrooms, three double classrooms, a computer lab, art room, assembly hall, library and six classrooms for Mother Tongue Studies. The large playground has two fields and a large outside basketball court. Covered walkways allow students and staff to traverse the campus in the rain without getting wet.

Originally the kindergarten and the preschool for 3-year-olds (Pukpuks) and 4-year-olds (Kapuls) were located on a separate campus. However, in June 2004 the kindergarten moved to the new primary campus. Then in July 2008 the preschool moved to the new campus.

== Secondary school ==
The campus consists of eight utility classrooms, two social studies rooms, five small MTS/Language study rooms; two computer rooms; three science classroom/laboratories; one room each for home economics, shop, art and audio visuals (seating about 90); library and music block consisting of rehearsal room, practice rooms, offices and workshop. Other facilities include a teachers’ lounge/kitchen area, workroom for teachers, offices (main and other offices), storerooms, MTS library, maintenance workshop, and a lounge for the senior class.

== Sports facilities ==
The campus has a large sports oval (used for soccer, softball, track and field, touch rugby, frisbee, etc.), a basketball court, volleyball court and a foursquare court, as well as a shed that stores supplies for baseball/softball, track and field, etc. The school has access to tennis courts and an indoor basketball court close by. One of the more prominent sports activities includes the yearly sports day where the school is divided up into two teams, Alpha and Beta (red and blue, respectively), who compete against each other in a variety of track and field activities. Alpha had a notable winning streak from 2015-2019. Sports day 2020 was cancelled due to the impact of the COVID-19 virus. A third team, Delta (green), was created by students in the early 2000s as a rebellion against the school administration for requiring every student to participate in athletics regardless of their interest or ability. It was never officially recognized by the school, and the leaders of team Delta were harshly reprimanded on multiple occasions. Regardless, Delta persisted in their efforts for several years. The primary school also has their own sports day, with fewer activities. Their teams are simply known as 'Green' (previously Red) and 'Yellow'.

== Student resources ==
Computers with internet access are available in the computer labs and the library. Textbooks are provided for students and are obtained mainly from the United States and Australia. The UISSC music/band program has musical instruments; students keep a borrowed instrument which they can use to practice at home and participate in band class/concerts.
