= Aiyura Airport =

Airport in Papua New Guinea

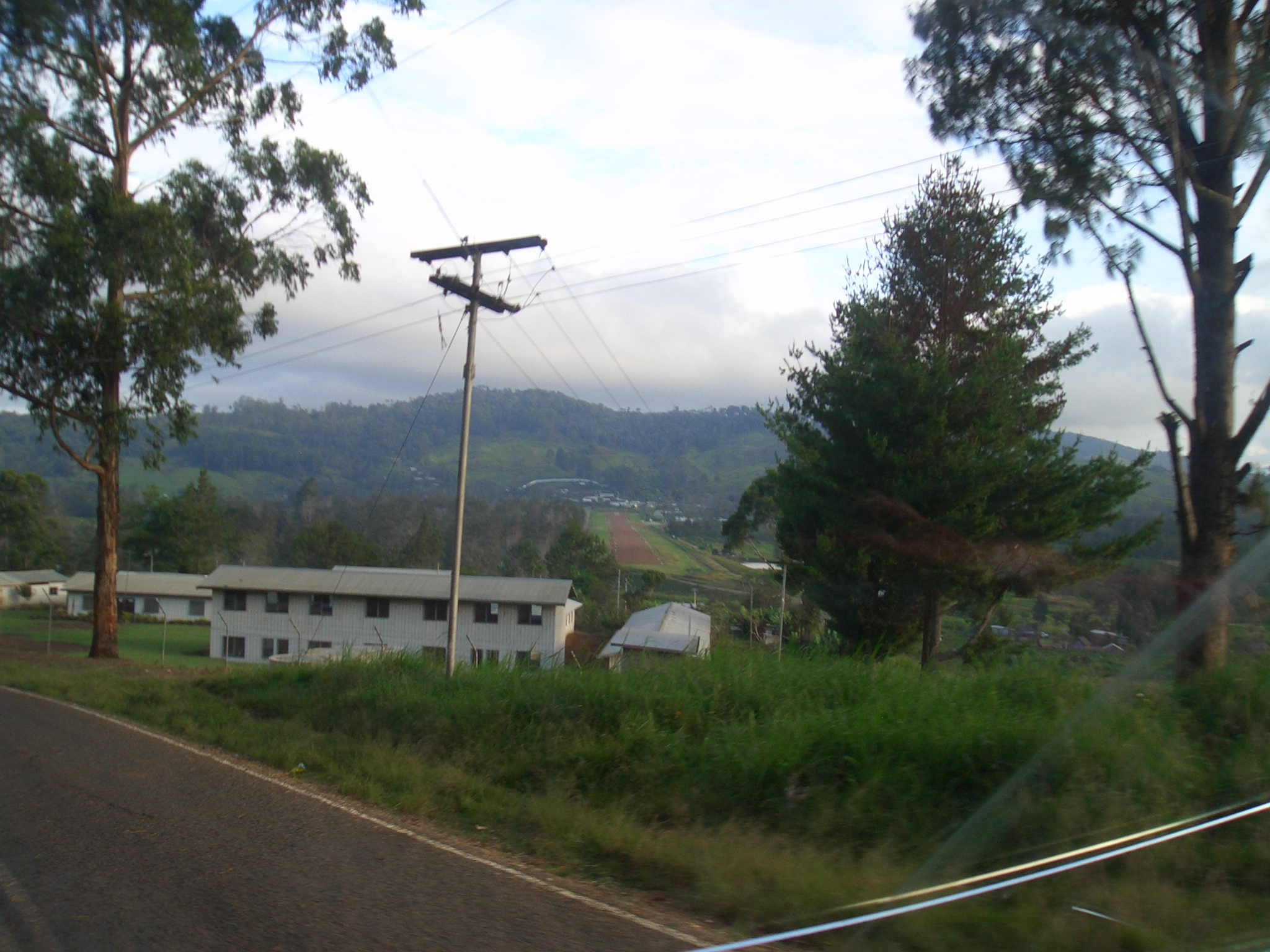
- Aiyura Valley viewed from road leading in from Kainantu. Aiyura airport is in the background.
- IATA: AYU; ICAO: AYAY

Summary
- Location: Aiyura, Papua New Guinea
- Elevation AMSL: 5,100 ft / 1,554 m
- Coordinates: 06°20′16″S 145°54′14″E

Maps
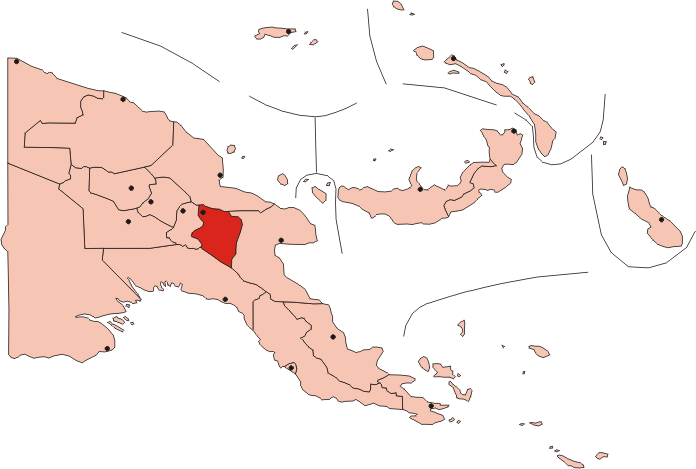
- Eastern Highlands Province of Papua New Guinea

- Location of the airport in Papua New Guinea

Runways
Direction	Length		Surface
Direction	m	ft	Surface
14L/32R	1,280	4,199
- Source: PNG Airstrip Guide

Aiyura Airport (IATA: AYU, ICAO: AYAY) is an airstrip in Aiyura, in the Eastern Highlands Province of Papua New Guinea. It is the main air field for Summer Institute of Linguistics (SIL). The pilots and mechanics who work out of Aiyura Airport live in the nearby SIL town of Ukarumpa.
