= Aiyura National High School =

School in Eastern Highlands Province, Papua New Guinea

Location
- Private Mail Bag, Kainantu, Eastern Highlands Province; Aiyura, Papua New Guinea; 6.342°S 145.895°E

Information
- Religious affiliation: None
- Established: 1976
- Gender: Coeducational 11th and 12th grades
- Enrolment: 750

Aiyura National High School is one of six government-run national high schools in Papua New Guinea (PNG), now known as "Schools of Excellence". Situated in the Eastern Highlands Province, it is a boarding school for Grades 11 and 12, and its students come from all over PNG.

== Description ==
Aiyura National High School was established in 1976, a year after PNG achieved independence. The aim of having national schools that would draw students from all over the country was to develop a concept of national unity in a culturally diverse society. The school is situated in the Aiyura valley, which is often known as "windy valley". Other institutions in the valley include a coffee research station and other agricultural research facilities, two primary schools, an airfield and aircraft engineering school, and the PNG headquarters of the Summer Institute of Linguistics, an evangelical Christian organization. The school is about 10 km (6.2 mi) from the town of Kainantu.

The school enrolled around 750 students in 2020. Subjects taught are: language and literature (compulsory); mathematics and advanced mathematics; biology; chemistry; physics; economics; geography; and history. It is now offering STEM (Science, Technology, Engineering, and Technology) courses for students selected to take STEM course. It was started in 2021 and is currently being offered in addition to the other subjects offered.

In recent years, increased emphasis has been placed on improving the school's ICT infrastructure and new ICT and science buildings have been opened.
