= Aiyura =

Valley in Papua New Guinea

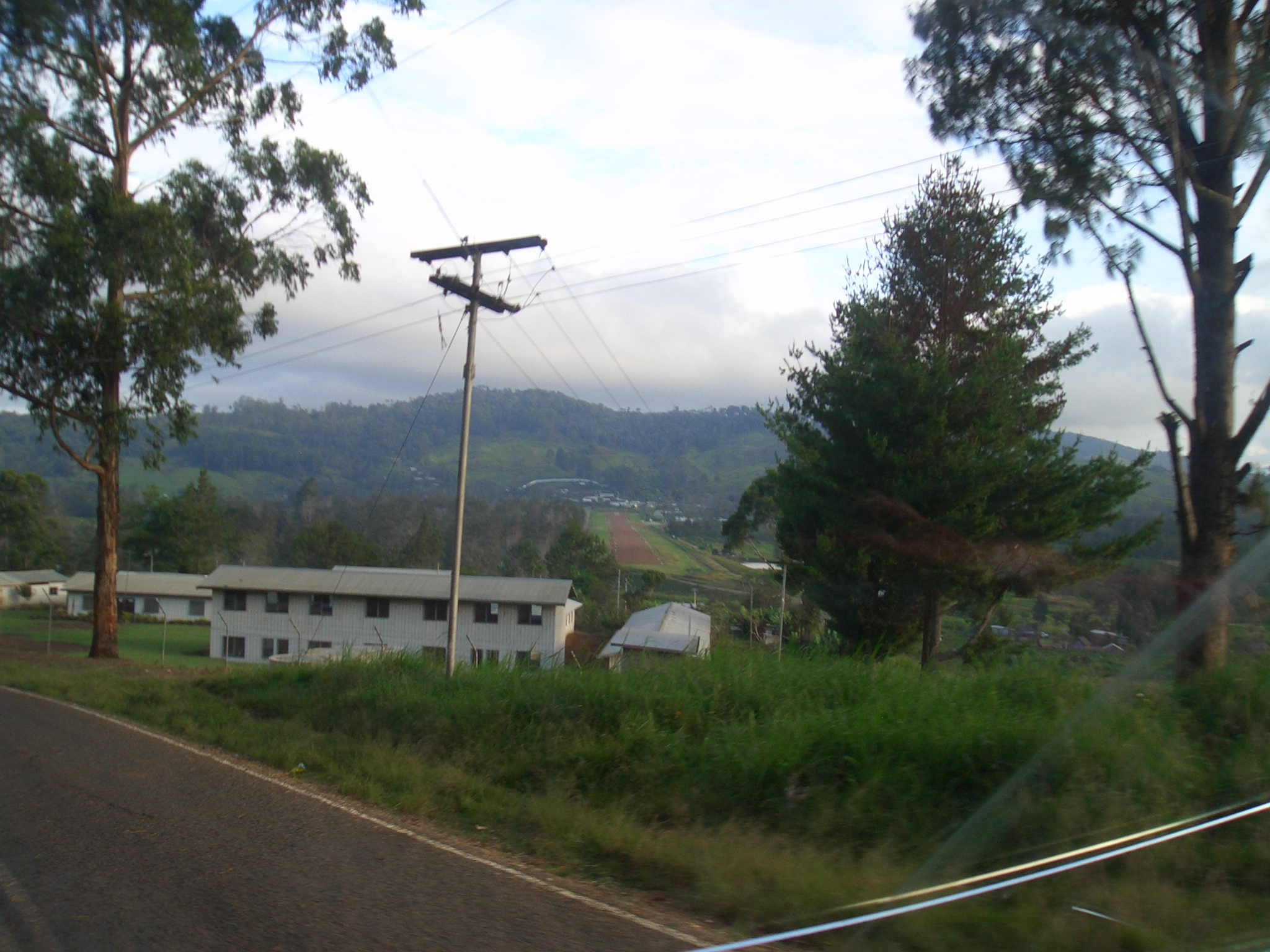
Aiyura Valley viewed from road leading in from Kainantu. The Aiyura airport is in the background.

Aiyura is the name of a valley located in the Eastern Highlands of Papua New Guinea. It is the home of the Aiyura Agricultural Research Station, which was operated originally as the "Highlands Agricultural Experiment Station, Aiyura" begun in 1936 by Mr. Bill Brechin, an Australian Agriculturist. In 1937 work was begun clearing the land for the airstrip which is now the home in Papua New Guinea of JAARS (the aviation wing of Wycliffe Bible Translators), Airstrip IATA code AYU known as Aiyura Airport. Aiyura played a role in World War II when the Aiyura Airstrip was bombed by the Japanese on June 15, 1943, with six bombers and six fighter aircraft.

Aiyura contains a Coffee Research Institute, Aiyura National High School, The Aiyura International Primary School, a local national primary school called Professor Schindler's School and is the traditional home and battlegrounds of the Gadsup and Tairora people. Ukarumpa, the main center for Summer Institute of Linguistics (SIL) in Papua New Guinea, is also located nearby in the valley.

Geographical Notes:

Altitude: 5300 feet.

Climate: Tropical Highland
