= Education in Papua New Guinea =

Department of Education

National education budget (2016)
- Budget: 1242.8 million PGK

General details
- Primary languages: English, Tok Pisin, Hiri Motu and others
- System type: Public, religious, private

Literacy (2015 est)
- Total: 64.2%
- Male: 65.6%
- Female: 62.8%

Enrollment (2014)
- Total: 1,805,000
- Primary: 1,427,000
- Secondary: 243,000 (Lower); 136,000 (Upper)

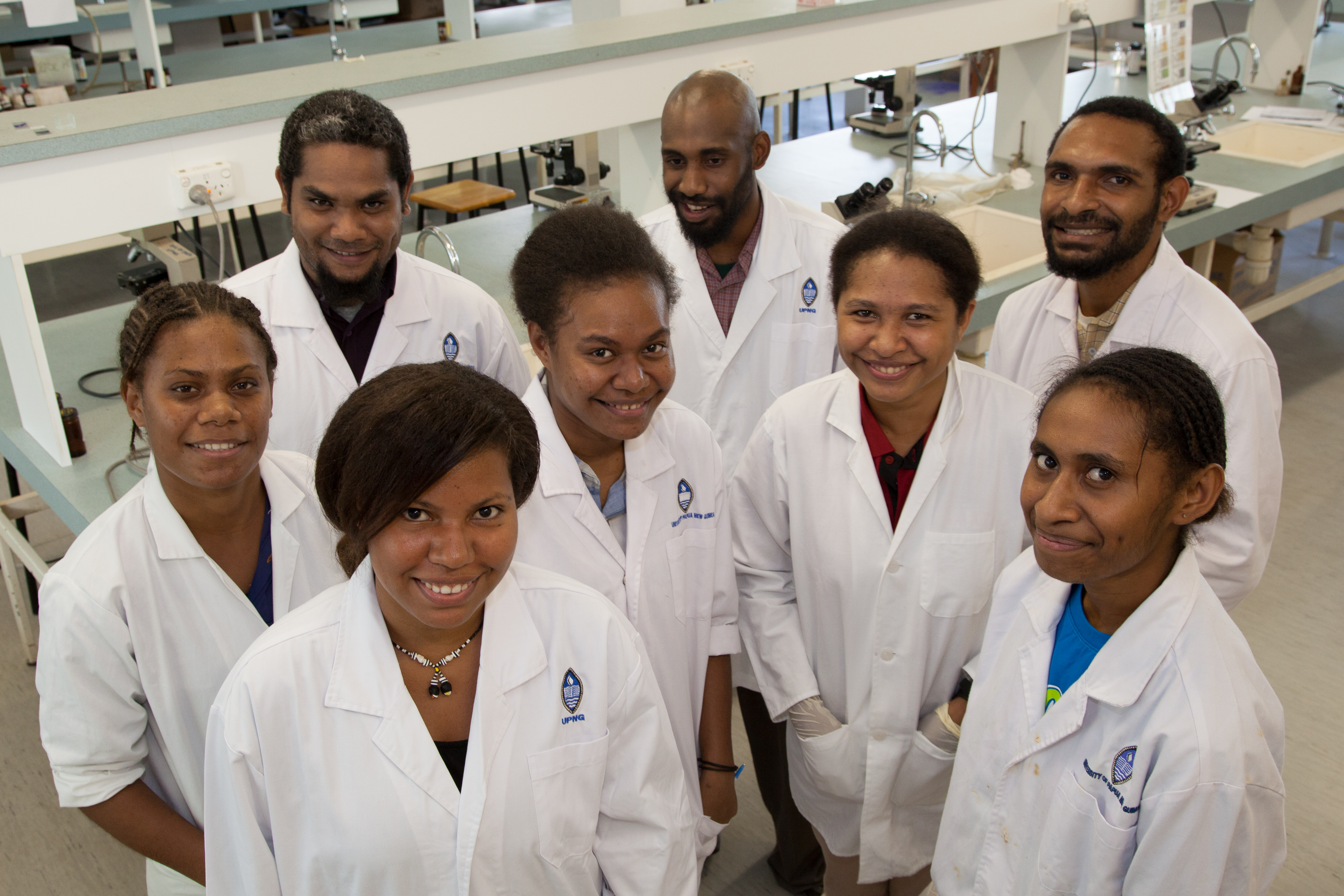
Medical students from the UPNG School of Medicine and Health Science

Education in Papua New Guinea is managed through nineteen provinces and two district organisational units. It is tuition-free and attendance is not compulsory.

Based on 2021 data, the Human Rights Measurement Initiative (HRMI) finds that Papua New Guinea is fulfilling 63.5% of what it should be fulfilling for the right to education based on the country's level of income. HRMI breaks down the right to education by looking at the rights to both primary education and secondary education. While taking into consideration Papua New Guinea's income level, the nation is achieving 96.5% of what should be possible based on its resources (income) for primary education and only 40.6% for secondary education.

== History ==
The first school in Papua New Guinea was established in 1873 by English missionaries. Missionaries would continue providing the basis for education, with English and German as primary languages. In 1914, as part of World War I, Australia took control over German New Guinea and English became the sole official language.

The Currie Commission was created in 1964 to investigate the establishment of higher education in the Territory of Papua and New Guinea. In 1965 the first university in Papua New Guinea, the University of Papua New Guinea, was established. It was heavily influenced by the Australian education system.

In 1995, the government of Papua New Guinea implemented a bilingual education program that uses both community languages and English.

Education in Papua New Guinea has been tuition-free since 2012, as one of the election promises of the People's National Congress. This policy was cancelled in 2019 under Prime Minister Peter O'Neill's government, however, PM James Marape announced in 2021 that his government would re-institute the policy starting in 2022.

== Provision ==
Papua New Guinea's history of missionary education has led to a large part of education being provided by religious schools. The Department of Education has estimated that 29% of the country's lower secondary education is operated by churches. 3% is operated by private international schools, while the remainder is funded by the government.

== Educational stages ==
Papua New Guinea has an A-to-D grading system, with D being a failing grade.

During the first three years of formal education, community languages are taught as a subject and used for instruction. In grades seven and eight, instruction is conducted solely in English, although community languages may still be used informally. By the early 2000s, more than 400 languages were being used in Papua New Guinea’s educational system.

Education
Age	Level		School	Language
7	Introductory		Local community school	Local languages
8	Introductory		Local community school	Local languages
9	Primary		Local community school	Local languages
10	Primary		Local community school	Local languages
11	Primary		Local community school	Local languages
12	Primary		Local community school	Local languages
13	Middle		Local community school	Local languages
14	Middle		Local community school	Local languages
15	Middle		Provincial high school	Official languages (English, Tok Pisin, Hiri Motu)
16	Middle		Provincial high school	Official languages (English, Tok Pisin, Hiri Motu)
17	Secondary	Vocational (duration varies)	National high school	Official languages (English, Tok Pisin, Hiri Motu)
18	Secondary	Vocational (duration varies)	National high school	Official languages (English, Tok Pisin, Hiri Motu)
19+	Tertiary	Vocational (duration varies)	University	Official languages (English, Tok Pisin, Hiri Motu)

== Universities ==
There are six universities in Papua New Guinea. These are accredited under the PNG Office of Higher Education and have establishing Acts of Parliament. The six universities and the main campus of each are, in alphabetical order:

- Divine Word University in Madang
- Pacific Adventist University in Port Moresby
- University of Goroka in Goroka
- University of Natural Resources and Environment in Vudal with associated campuses in Popondetta, Kavieng and Sepik
- University of Papua New Guinea in Port Moresby
- University of Technology (Unitech) in Lae

== Language education ==
In 2015, Papua New Guinean Sign Language became an official language in PNG. Based on Auslan, it is used in deaf education.
