= Melissa Aigilo =

Intelligence Analyst and Author from Papua New Guinea

Melissa M. Aigilo is a strategic intelligence analyst and author from Papua New Guinea. Aigilo is Papua New Guinea’s first author on Intelligence Analysis and the country’s most prolific writer in the niche of Strategic Analysis. Known for her precise, cold, and surgical writing, her work exposes security vulnerabilities, shapes professional intelligence practice, and provides evidence.

== Life ==
Aigilo grew up the eldest of five children and attended St Joseph’s International Primary School, Marianville Girls Catholic High School and the Port Moresby National High School.

She graduated from the University of Papua New Guinea in 2006 with a Bachelor o Papua New Guinea.Her mentors there included Steven Winduo and Russell Soaba.

== Publications ==
- Falling foliage, 2004, University of Papua New Guinea
- Poems, Kunapipi, 27(2), 2005, University of Wollongong
- Mapping the Darkness: A New Age of Criminal Intelligence in Papua New Guinea, 2025, Apple Books
- Shadows At the Gate: External Actors and National Security Vulnerabilities in Papua New Guinea, 2025, Kobo Books
- The Intelligence Spine: A Framework for Intelligence Coordination in Papua New Guinea, 2026, Apple Books
