= Tairora people =

Tairora is a tribal group of people living in the Eastern Highlands of Papua New Guinea in or near the Aiyura Valley. They are the traditional enemy of the Gadsup.

== See also ==
- Tairoa language
