= Wawin National High School =

School in Morobe Province, Papua New Guinea

Wawin National School of Excellence

Location
- PO Box 315, Lae; Morobe Province; Papua New Guinea
- 6.497°S 146.593°E

Information
- Religious affiliation: None
- Established: 2000
- Staff: 50
- Gender: Coeducational 11th and 12th grades
- Enrolment: 900

Wawin National School of Excellence is one of the six government-run national high schools in Papua New Guinea, which are now known as "Schools of Excellence". The coeducational school caters for Grades 11 and 12 only, and is a boarding school.

== Description ==
Wawin National School of Excellence is located in Morobe Province, Papua New Guinea (PNG). It is in a remote location around 7 miles north of the 40th Mile (from Lae) of the Highlands Highway. There are about 500 students and around 27 teachers. Students from throughout PNG can apply to attend the school, which was built with assistance from the Government of China.The majority (over 65%) of students selected by the school come from rural high and secondary schools from the 9 districts in the Morobe Province.

Subjects taught are: English language and literature; general and advanced mathematics; chemistry; biology; physics; applied science; economics; accounting; business studies; history; geography and information and communications technology (ICT). The school is part of the Papua New Guinea and Australia Partnership for Secondary Schools, which aims to give students from both countries the opportunity to study together and work on joint projects. In 2021, the school started to offer a new curriculum known as the STEM curriculum, which comprises STEM Mathematics, STEM Biology, STEM Physics, STEM Chemistry, STEM Engineering and STEM Technology. The school's first students in STEM will graduate in 2022. The selection of students to study the STEM curriculum is determined by the students' results in term 1, after having been streamed into science or social science at the beginning of the academic year in February, based on their results on their grade 10 certificate.

== Facilities/Amenities ==
The school's facilities for learning and recreation include 4 living quarters for boys and 2 dormitories for girls. It has 16 classrooms, 2 computer laboratories, 6 science laboratories, 1 clinic, 1 library, a large mess hall, a large playing field for soccer and rugby, 2 basketball courts, 2 volleyball courts and a netball court.

The school has a canteen to cater for students and teachers. It has 24 hour security, a diesel back-up generator and its own water supply with a dedicated standby generator.

== School academic performance ==
The school academic performance among the national high school group in the school national ratings has been good. In 2021, the school rose to 3rd place from the 6th position it held in 2020 out of 6 schools.

== Former Principals ==
1: Mr Elias (2001–2004)

2: Mr Tetang Punumping (2005)

3: Mr Punumpin (2006–2007)

4: Mr Aiwara (2006–2009)

5: Mr Packiam Arulappan (2010- August 2014)

6: Mr Pal Pu (2014 August- 2025)
