= Port Moresby National High School =

School in National Capital District, Papua New Guinea

Location
- Goro - Kaeaga Rd; Port Moresby; Papua New Guinea
- Coordinates: 9.402°S 147.164°E

Information
- Religious affiliation: None
- Established: 1995
- Staff: 50
- Gender: Coeducational 11th and 12th grades
- Enrolment: 600

Port Moresby National High School is one of the six national government high schools in Papua New Guinea (PNG) and the only one that does not offer boarding facilities. It was officially opened on 1 June 1995. The school's intake is limited to Grades 11 and 12 and it has more than 600 students and 50 staff.

== Description ==
Port Moresby National High School (POMNATHS) is situated in Port Moresby in the National Capital District of PNG. It was funded by the Government of Japan and continues to maintain close contact with Japan, with student exchanges taking place. The school was the fourth national high school to be established in PNG. Part of PNG's "Schools of Excellence" program, in 2021 it was ranked second of the six national schools, based on exam results. Around one half of its students go on to tertiary education.

The school's intake comes from Port Moresby, but students with origins from all of the country's 22 provinces are represented. It organizes an annual cultural show, known as Hahenamo ("celebration" in the Motu language of the Port Moresby area), which allows students to showcase their cultures through traditional singing and dancing.

The school offers courses in the following subjects: mathematics; biology; chemistry; physics; geology; applied science; language and literature; economics; accounting; business studies; history; geography; legal studies; information technology; and home economics. In 2021, it introduced a new focus on Science, technology, engineering, and mathematics (STEM) subjects.

== Former students ==
- Melissa Aigilo, writer and poet
