= University of Goroka =

University in Goroka, Papua New Guinea

Coordinates: 6.0586°S 145.3914°E

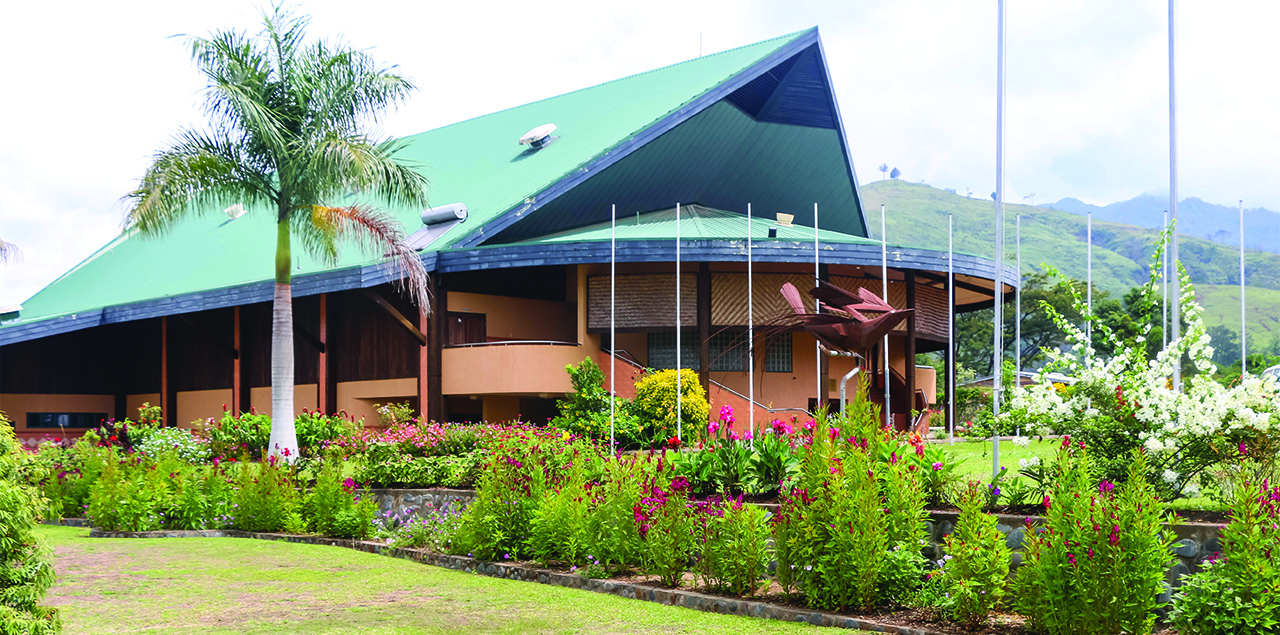
- Mark Solon Auditorium
- Motto: Creating the Future
- Type: Public
- Established: 1965
- Chancellor: Joe Wemin
- Vice-Chancellor: Dr. Teng Waninga
- Students: 5700 plus
- Location: Goroka, Eastern Highlands, Papua New Guinea
- Campus: (various)
- Affiliations: Association of Commonwealth Universities
- Website: unigoroka.ac.pg

University of Goroka (UOG) is a university in the Eastern Highlands Province of Papua New Guinea. It provides teaching in four schools (Postgraduate Studies, Education, Science & Technology, and Humanities) and in two institutes (Technical Vocational Education & Training and Distance & Flexible Learning). The university also runs a consulting arm, 'UniGor Consultancy Limited', with projects of nearly 7 million kina.

The Vice Chancellor is Dr. Teng Waninga. The Pro Vice-Chancellors are Dr. Matthew Landu and Dr. Stephen Potek.

== History ==
The university was originally established in 1965 as a primary teachers' college. In 1967, it became a secondary teachers' college, and in 1992, a campus of the University of Papua New Guinea. In January 1997, the campus was independently established as the University of Goroka.

== Affiliation ==
- Association of Commonwealth Universities

== Gallery ==
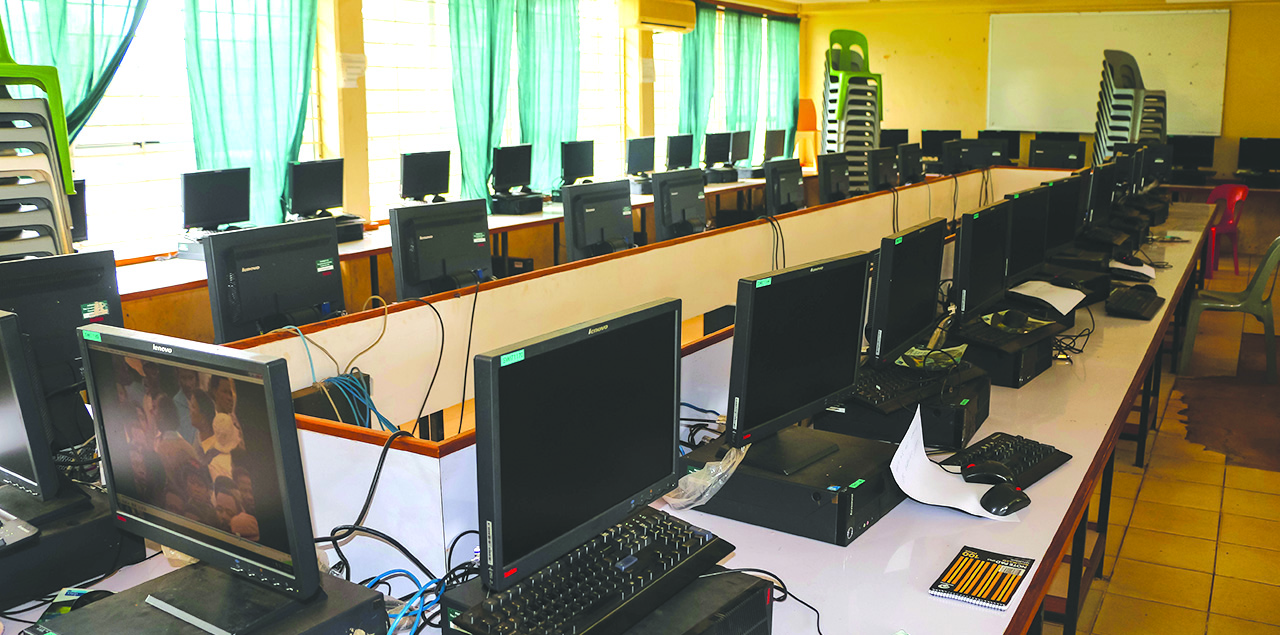
Computer Lab

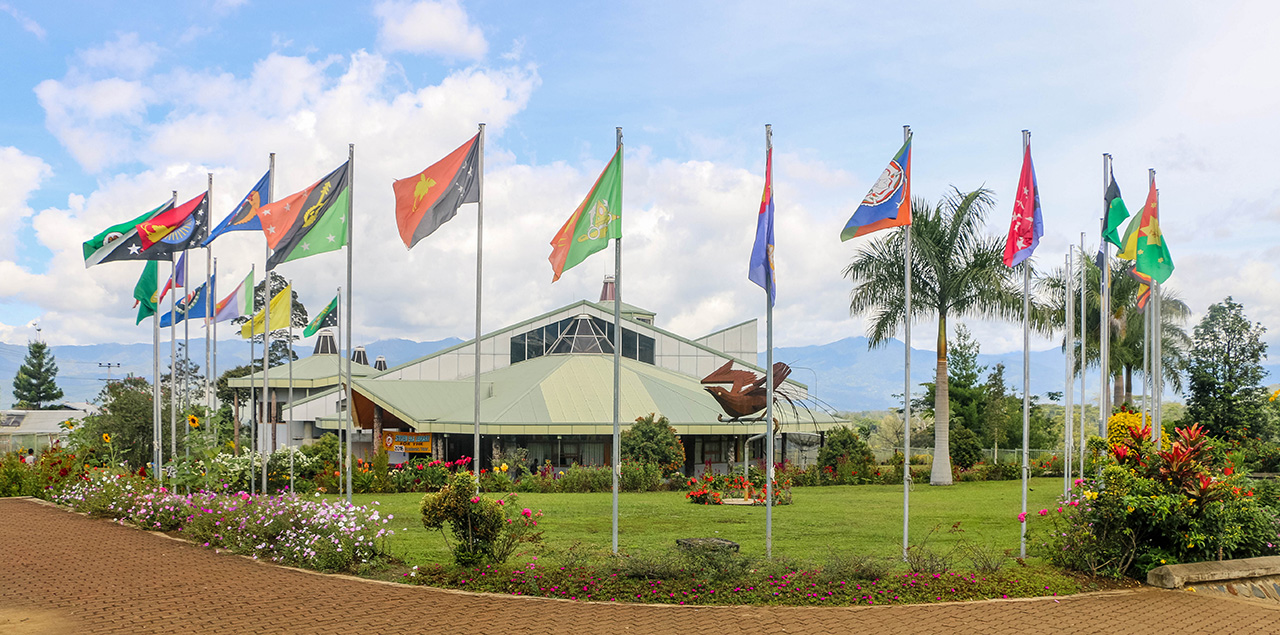
UOG Library Image 1

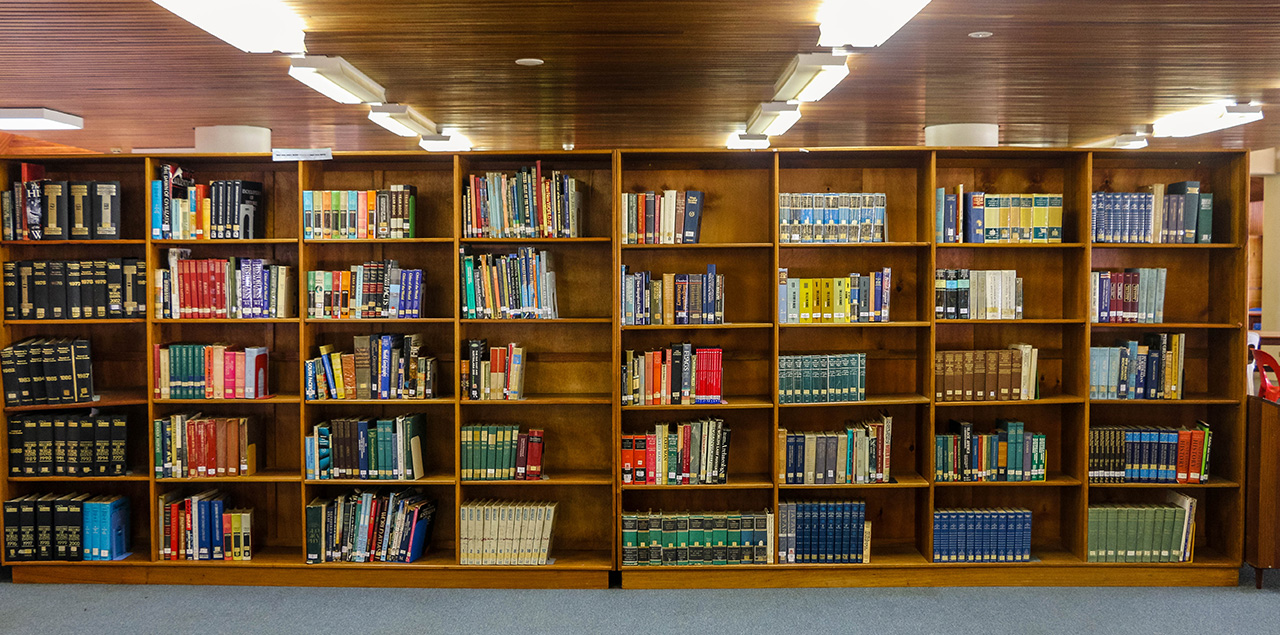
UOG Library Image 2

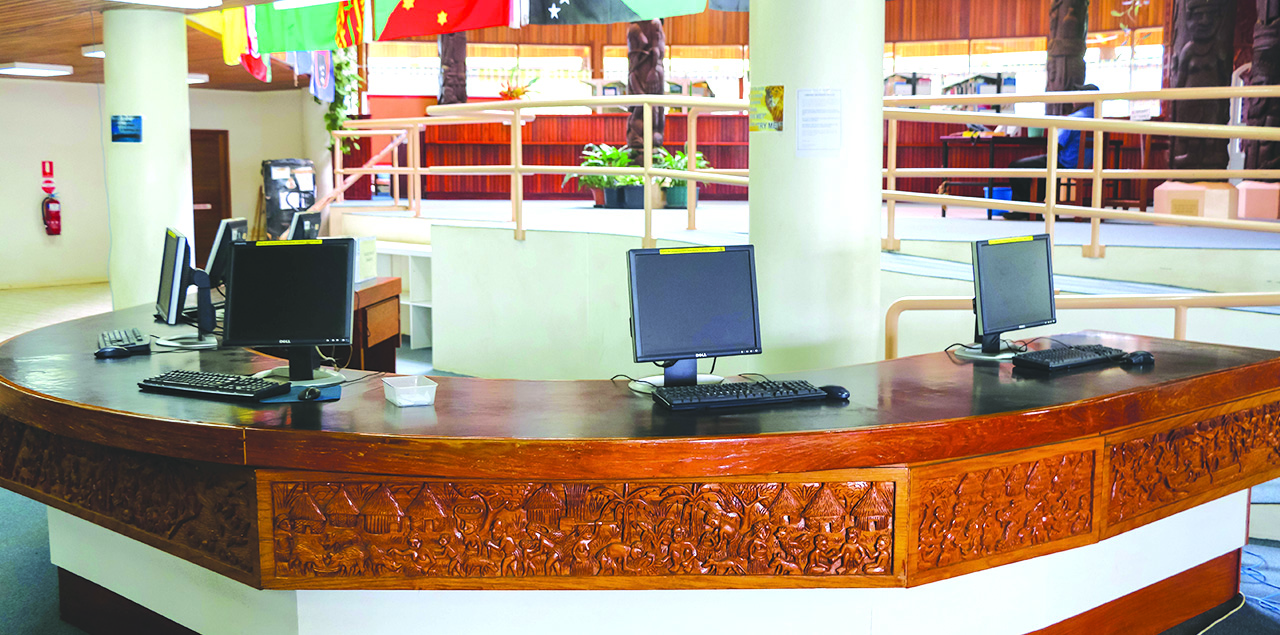
UOG Library Image 3

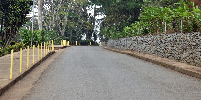
UOG Walkway

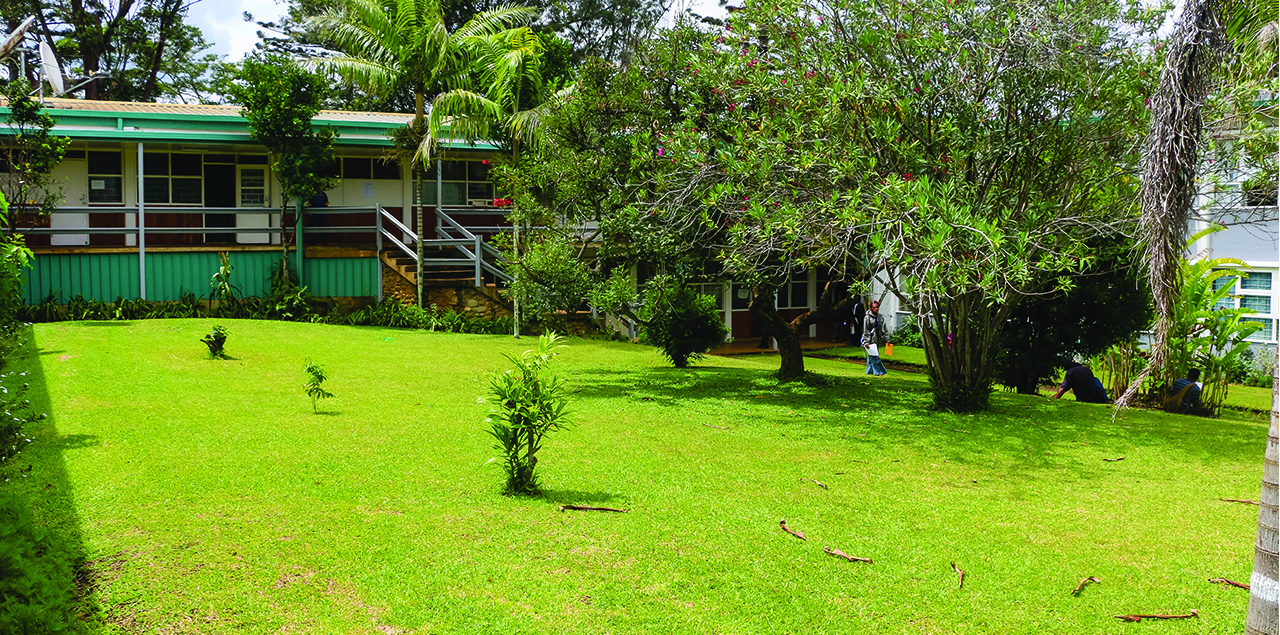
Main Quad

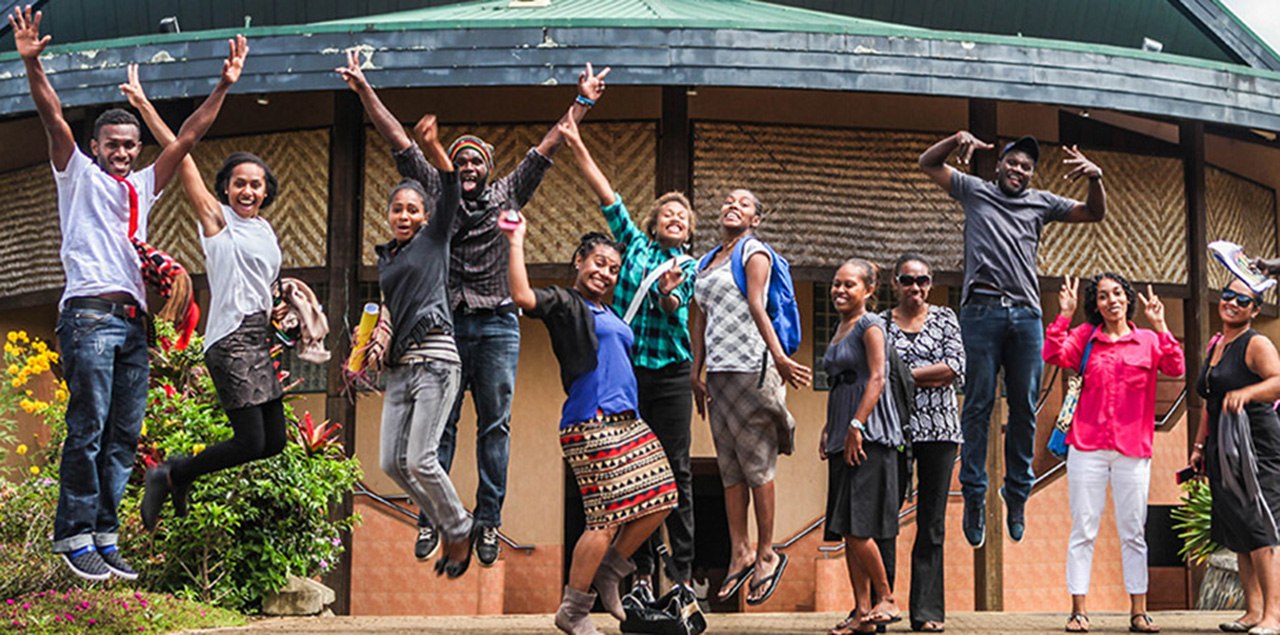
Students
