= Gadsup people =

Gadsup is a tribal group of people living in Eastern Highlands Province of Papua New Guinea in or near the Aiyura Valley. They are traditional enemies of the Tairora people. They speak the Gadsup language.
