= Kainantu =

- Location within Papua New Guinea
- Coordinates: 6°17′30″S 145°51′40″E
- Country: Papua New Guinea
- Province: Eastern Highlands
- District: Kainantu District

Population (2000)
  - Total: 6,723
  - Rank: 22nd

Languages
  - Main languages: Tok Pisin, English, Agarabi, Kamano
- Time zone: UTC+10 (AEST)
- Location: 132 km (82 mi) from Lae; 58 km (36 mi) from Goroka

Kainantu is a town in the Eastern Highlands of Papua New Guinea. It had some historical significance as an airstrip town during WWII. It functions primarily as a market town for local produce growers and cash croppers. It is located on the "Highlands Highway" approximately 170 kilometres (110 mi) by road west of Lae and 90 kilometres (56 mi) by road east of Goroka. It is 11 kilometres (6.8 mi) approx from a nearby missionary station Ukarumpa and is nearby the Aiyura valley. Kainantu has basic facilities such as a school, hospital, police station, district court, and service stations.

== History ==
=== Early history ===
The area was explored in the 1929 by the two Lutheran missionaries, Pilhofer and Bergmann. and again in 1930 by two Australian explorers Mick Leahy and Mick Dwyer. (Note: This reference was adapted from brochure produced by Eastern Highlands Culture & Tourism)

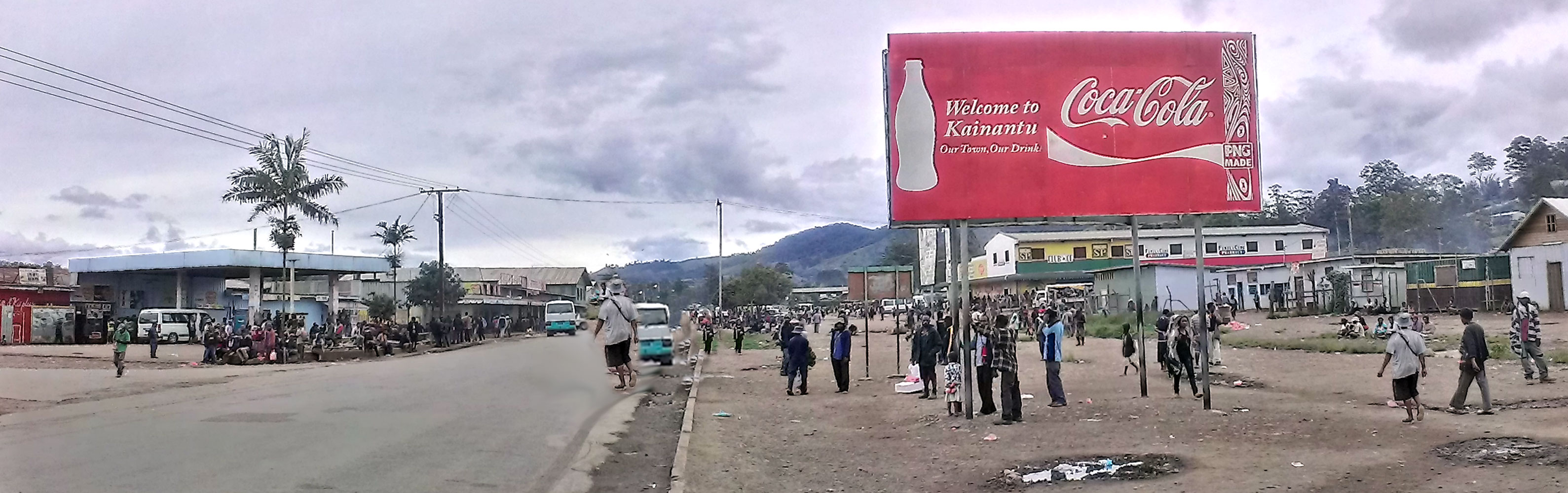
Kainantu on the Highlands Highway. Facing towards Goroka

=== Early missions ===
Under German New Guinea this area was part of Kaiser-Wilhelmsland. Lutheran missionaries first established mission stations at Finschhafen and moved up the Markham Valley towards the Eastern Highlands. Between 1916 and 1918 the Kaiapit station was established by the Neuendettelsau Mission Society and by 1919 eighteen Yabem evangelists were resident in the surrounding area and made contact with small groups on the fringes of the Eastern Highlands.

These early contacts with the Gadsup were gradually developed in the early 1920s and evangelist out-stations were successively founded by the Lutherans at Binumarien and Wampur. Lutheran missionaries, Pilhofer and Bergmann explored this area and in 1931 established a temporary mission station, bush-material home and small farm at Kambaidam to enable further extension of the mission inland. In 1933 they established a more convenient station at Onerunka, near Kainantu where they joined a small number of gold prospectors and government officers from the Upper Ramu (Kainantu) patrol post.

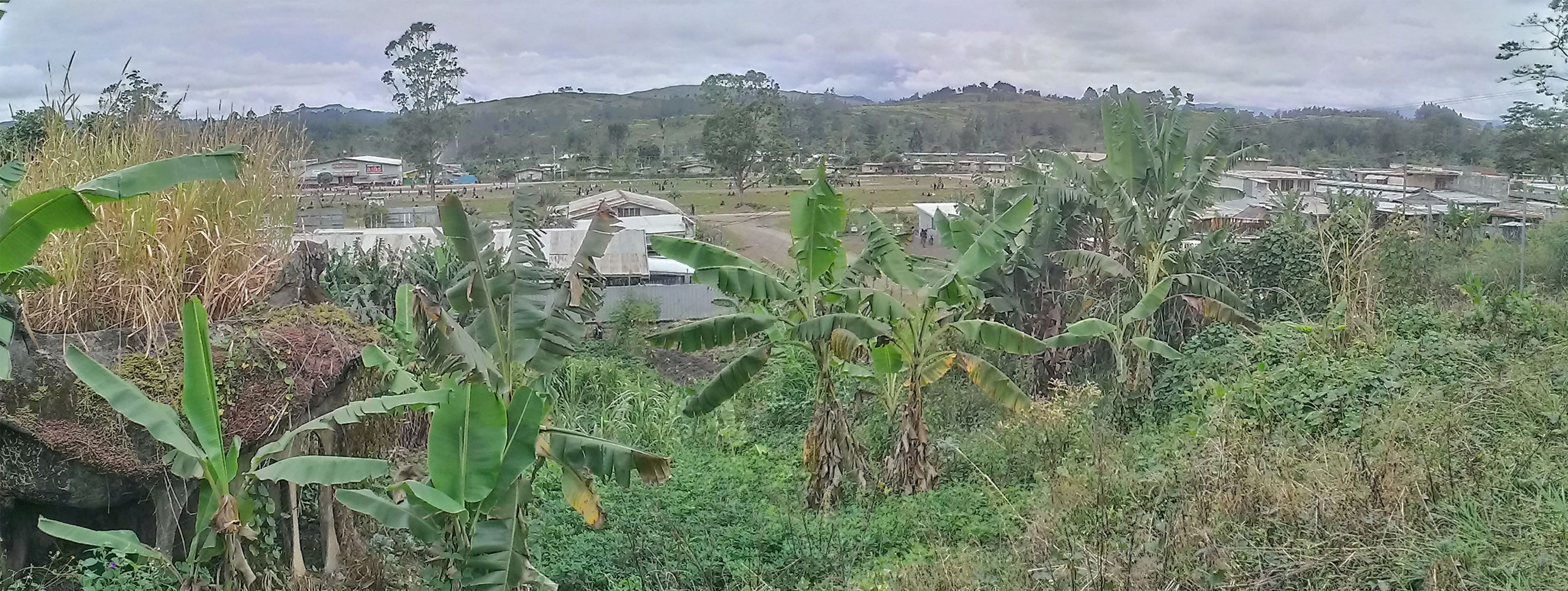
View from Cross of Remembrance over Kainantu

In 1934 a small Seventh-day Adventist undertaking was started at Kainantu by a European missionary and ten Solomon Islands evangelists which increased to 40 the following year. In 1941 there were 19 Seventh-day Adventist outposts compared to 17 Lutheran out-stations but this decreased after the war.

Throughout the 1930s internecine warfare was common and resulted in the deaths of two Europeans and retribution. An influenza epidemic resulted in many sorcery accusations and tribal fighting and a new Kainantu government officer (James Taylor) attempted a process of "re-education".

==== Pacification movement ====
In response to the disturbances, the administration amended the Uncontrolled Areas Ordinance (1925) to curtail European movement in the highlands. Apart from government officers, Europeans were not allowed to enter the Highlands and those presented were restricted to their settlements. Kainantu Government Officer (Aitchison) prohibited the work of all missionary operations. in

By 1934 Hans Flierl, the son of Johann Flierl was operating 19 evangelist out-stations around Kainantu from the Raipinka Mission Station. In response to the government proclamation, Flierl led a large party of warriors to Kainantu, where they deposited weapons and sorcery items for Aitchison to destroy. These events set off a chain reaction from Dunantina in the west to Pundibassa in the east. Over the next few months groups of warriors in increasing numbers arrived at Kainantu to destroy the 21 instruments of war. Only in the Kainantu areas were the missionaries successful in having the government prohibitions lifted and as a result of the actions by Kainantu missionaries the government policy was changed.

=== Later Lutheran Missions ===
By 1940 the Onerunka Station was operating some 25 out-stations and 16 schools with 500 pupils. As a result of WW2 the work was halted but recommenced by 1947 where some 60 chapels were constructed throughout the region.

=== World War 2 ===
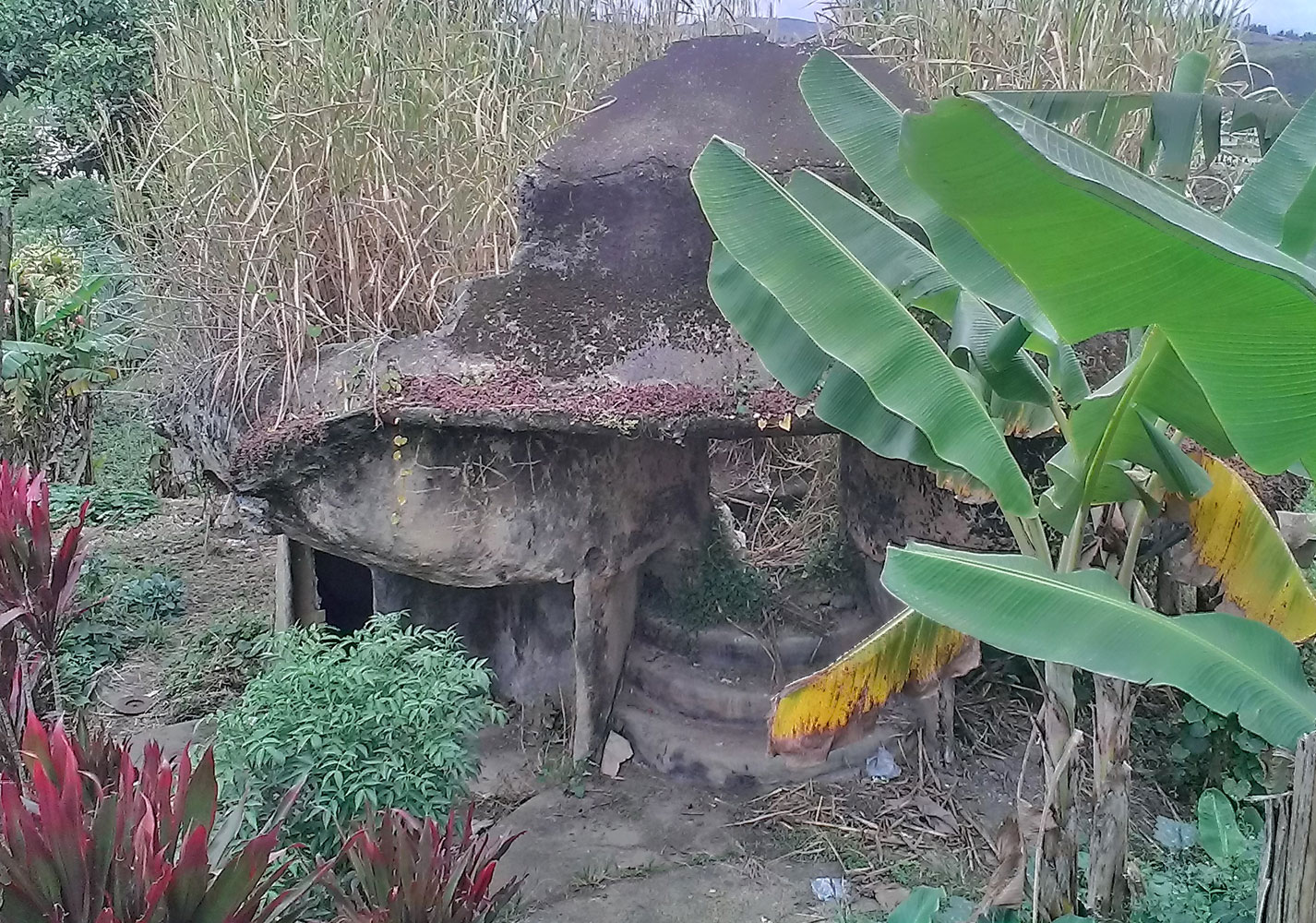
Concrete structure described by locals as a Japanese bunker

In 1943, Japanese patrols partially succeeded in entering the Eastern Highlands and there were numerous air raids on the various airstrips. Small detachments were later sent in defence of the airstrips including Kainantu.

The 2/7th Independent Company Headquarters (Bena Force) was supplied by provisions from Kainantu. This was an experimental house build by an architect Rex Addison working out of Lae technical college about 1960-1970.

=== 1960s ===
Mr. Graham Pople was a former kiap (patrol officer) and Member of the first Papua and New Guinea House of Assembly in 1964 and in 2010 authored The Popleography, an unpublished manuscript. When describing Kainantu in the 1960s he writes:

Kainantu was a lovely little town in the early ‘60s and was thriving based many coffee plantations being established in the area and also of gold. It had been the centre of gold rushes in the early 1930s. The Summer Institute of Linguistics had their PNG headquarters at Ukarumpa, just over the hill from Kainantu which was also where the Aiyura agricultural station was established. There was a quite large, for a sub-district office, non-indigenous population in the area. Kainantu had its own airstrip, and the town had grown up around this feature, with the district office on the northern side and the hospital at the southern western end. There was a nine-hole golf course with a very well-frequented club house. A hotel sat on a knoll above the main township which was managed by a Dutch couple who were very hospitable. The Salvation Army were active in the area and out on the road to Okapa they had a block of land on some 200 acres where they were growing potatoes commercially and where they held Bible classes.

== Geography ==
=== Geology ===
Probable Palaeozoic metamorphic rocks, the Bena Bena Formation, intruded by Upper Triassic Bismarck Granodiorite and Mount Victor Granodiorite, constitute the basement on which lower Miocene Nasananka Conglomerate and Omaura Greywacke were laid down. The andesitic Aifunka Volcanics of probable Pliocene age, Pleistocene lake sediments, and Recent alluvial deposits complete the stratigraphical record of the area.

=== Topography ===
A narrow south-east-trending dissected plateau dominates area to the south; it forms the watershed between rivers draining north to the Markham-Ramu Graben, and those draining south to the Papuan coast. The plateau ranges in elevation between 7,500 feet (2,300 m) and 8,000 feet (2,400 m) above sea level, and is about 2,500 feet (760 m) above the surrounding country. It is 11 miles (18 km) wide at its north-western end, but narrows to about 3 miles (4.8 km)to the south-east, where Nompia Creek cuts across it in a deep gorge . East of Nompia Creek, it is about 8 miles (13 km) wide, and the Lamari River flows across it in another deep gorge. The streams draining the plateau are mature over most of their courses, but near its edge they are deeply incised and flow along youthful valleys.

=== Climate ===
The average rainfall is 1.8 meters annually. Being up in the mountains, the province has warm days and cool evenings, seemingly perfect, as most of the time is like spring. Daily temperatures range from a maximum of 27 to a minimum of 15 degrees, but some nights get as cold as 10 degrees.

== Demographics ==
The Kainantu languages include the Gadsup, Agarabi and Tairora languages. (Note: This reference was adapted from brochure produced by Eastern Highlands Culture & Tourism)

== Governance ==
=== Law and Order ===
In 1965 it was reported that;

Up to 30 Papuans were reported under protection at Kainantu as they feared payback from New Guineans.

In 1973 it was reported that;

Police arrested 23 men in Kainantu as a result of a woman being pinched on the bottom resulting in a wild brawl.

Before independence, the role of the Kiap was both judge and jury. In the highlands this role continued while the Constitutional Planning Committee, wanted the State to reform the courts, to reform the laws and to reshape the judiciary.

A major defect of the court system was the absence of local tribunals and elements within the Constitutional Planning Committee wanted to include these while many elements opposed. Soon after self-government, attempts were made to fill this gap. In Kainantu, Village Courts started up spontaneously and forced the hand of the Government. An immediate problem with the Village Courts was the impossibility of linking them through magistrates to the rest of the judicial system.

==== 2011 Massacre ====
In 2011 it was reported that 15 men were hacked to death in an early morning raid and their homes at Banana Block, a notorious settlement and was burnt to ashes. The event caused business disruption.

=== First National Election ===
In 1964 the first election of a national House of Assembly, by universal adult suffrage on a common roll, took place in the Territory of Papua and New Guinea.

In Kainantu, the only European candidate, (Holowei) was Barry Holloway who was an officer on leave from the Department of Native Affairs, and responsible for setting up the first (and only) two Local Government Councils in the sub-district, the Agarabi and Kamano Councils. Holowei won decisively in the Open Electorate as his first preferences were over twice as many as those of his nearest rival, To'uke, the Tairora candidate. The biggest single block of Holowei votes, over a third of his first preferences, came from Gadsup.

The issue of ethnic candidates, and of European vs. New Guinea candidates, was ruled out in the South Markham Special Electorate, of which the Kainantu Open Electorate formed a part, but which also included a sizeable area and population outside the Kainantu sub-district. Three European candidates were entered, of whom only two, Mr. Mick Casey and Mr. Graham Gilmore, were residents of the Kainantu area. Gilmore, a new arrival in Kainantu, had recently taken over as proprietor of the Kainantu Hotel.

The final figures in the Kainantu Open Electorate were: Holowei (Barry Holloway) - 8,350 The final figures in the South Markham Special Electorate were: G. Gilmore - 9,311

A later synoptic account told by group of Gadsup men highlights the pertinent features of the first election for a village group of 265 people in the Eastern Highlands of New Guinea. These horticultural people viewed the election as a very serious “business”, filled with many responsibilities, and having many uncertainties about it. A troublesome question in discussion was whether to vote for a “white man” or a “black man”.

“We got no good think-think, only the white man has good think-think. Now, suppose we fall down, only the white man can pick us up and lead us back to the right road.”

Conversely some villagers who had experienced only limited, and in some cases unfavourable, contact with the Europeans said,

“The white man, he doesn't know how we live in our village. He doesn't know what we want. He may take our land. It is time we black men talk for what we want.”

== Economy ==
Most produce from the highlands is sent to Lae for market. In the 1950s it is reported that it was common for up to 50 women to be sent to walk produce on top of their heads from Kainantu to Lae.

=== Colbran Coffee Lands ===
Colbran Coffee lands is a large coffee plantation run on the Kainantu highlands run by the Colbran Family since 1962. They are one of the largest plantations and coffee processing factories in PNG. They buy local parchment coffee from locals during harvest season and process is for domestic and international use. This provides work for the nearby locals. In 2009, the Colbran Family started a primary school that educates children from around 12 neighbouring villages.

=== Kainantu Gold Mine ===
Alluvial gold was discovered near Kainantu about 1930, by E. Ubank and N. Rowlands, who were the first Europeans in the area. Compared with the Wau-Bulolo Goldfields, where gold had just been discovered in the rich Edie Creek, the Kainantu Goldfields were neither very rich nor very extensive, and so never attracted large numbers of prospectors. By World War II the best patches of alluvial gold had been worked out, and the few lodes found had not proved economic. After the war the field provided a good living from both alluvial and lode mining for a small number of Europeans.

Construction of the Kainantu Gold Mine began in March 2004 and commenced operations in March 2006. In 2004 landowners threatened to close down Highlands Pacific's Kainantu gold mine. Kainantu Gold Mine is an underground mine and the concentrate is trucked to Lae and shipped to Japan for processing. In January 2009 production was halted. The mine has been designed to produce in excess of 100,000 ounces of gold per year. In 2007 a decision was made by Highlands Pacific Ltd. to sell Kainantu Gold mine and licences to Placer Dome Oceania, a subsidiary of Barrick Gold Corporation for a cash price of USD141.5 million. The mine was then sold to K92 Mining, a Canadian company, that has restarted the mine and is expanding the known resource (now about 4 million ounces) and yearly output (about 130,000 ounces). Both numbers are expected to be increased in the future. It is expected that by the end of 2022 mine production will be above 300,000 ounces per year.

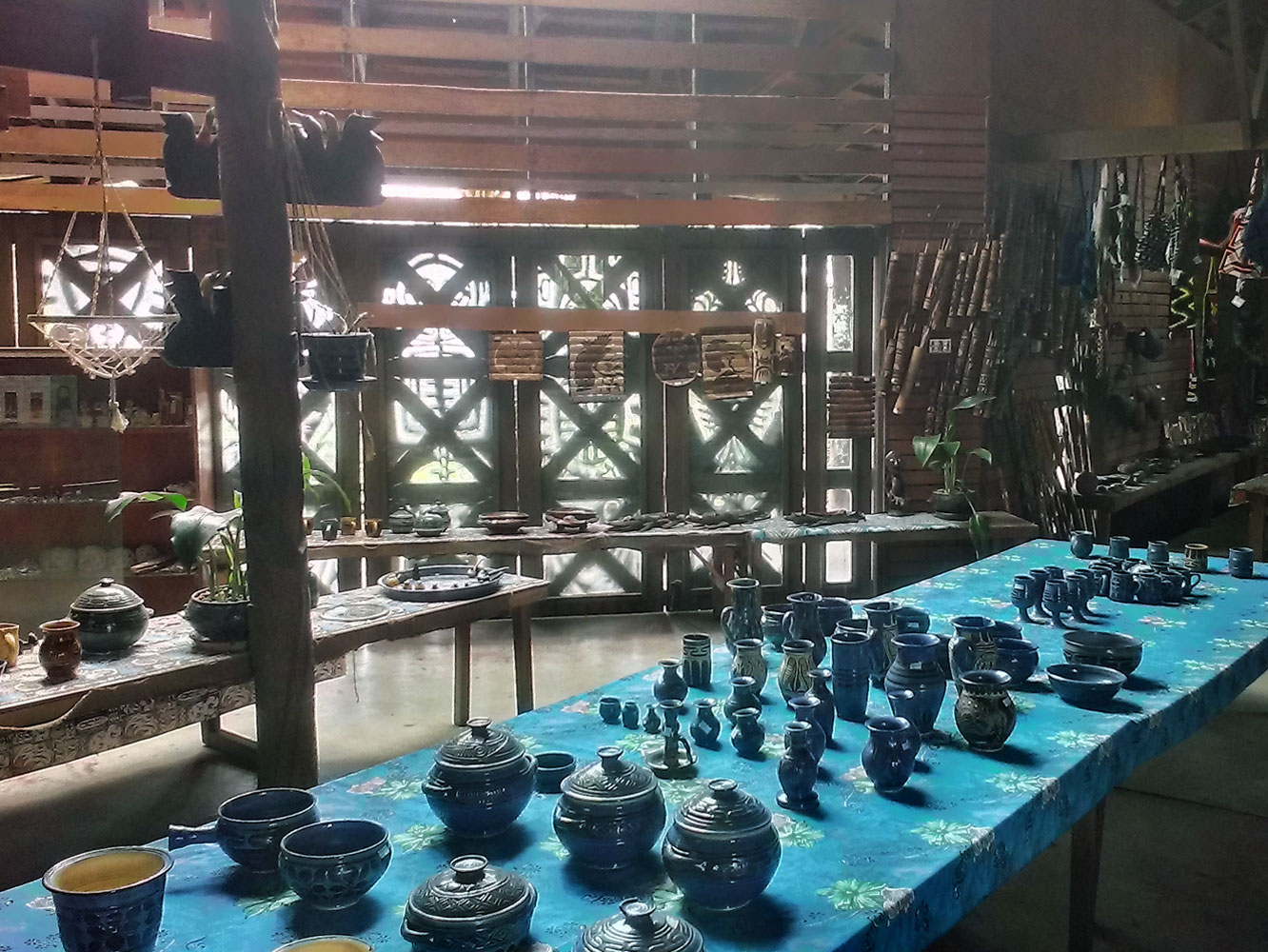
Eastern Highlands Cultural Centre and Museum

=== Eastern Highlands Cultural Centre and Museum ===
The focus of the cultural centre is the pottery and it is for this that the centre has become best known. The clay for the pots is all acquired locally from different areas and until recently preparing the clay for use was a time-consuming process, using only simple plaster beds. In 1994 the centre invested in a variety of new equipment such as a mixer, filter press and pug mill which has reduced the preparation time from weeks to days.

=== Kainantu Golf Club ===
==== History ====
The Kainantu Golf Club was established in 1958 largely through the efforts of Neville (Robbie) Robinson, an employee of the Department of Lands, Survey and Mines and Native Mining Officer. Historically the Kainantu golf course is one of the two oldest golf courses in the country (after the Bulolo golf course).

==== Description ====
The Kainantu course is/was a nine-hole course with two sets of tees to make for 18-hole game. The course was constructed along a number of ridge crests and so over the years the course has been a challenge to play. Narrow fairways, sloping roughs, small greens and nearby roads and gardens have made low course scoring rare. Par for the course for Club Members is 69 and for Associate Members 67. The lowest course score recorded was 61, shot by Randall Karcher from the Summer Institute of Linguistics.

Kainantu course hosted the 1978 Highlands Open Championship and in other years held the annual Kainantu Cup in June (dependent on corporate sponsorship). Other special golfing events were held over the years such as the Claret Cup and the Bundy Cup.

Local young Papua New Guinea boys from the area serve as caddies and flag boys. Caddies receive one kina for carrying the clubs for nine holes and two kina for eighteen holes. Flag boy are commissioned to find a stick and a plastic bag and run ahead of the players to plant the stick in the putting hole. At tournament times, official flag pins and tee markers are used.

==== Clubhouse ====
An original clubhouse was built at the end of the old hole number nine sometime in the 1960s built of bush material and it had a great view of the course and the surround mountains in every direction. Eventually that bush clubhouse was replaced. The second clubhouse was burnt down sometime in the early 1980s. The suspected cause of the fire was arson.

After the arson, the course was altered so that the new clubhouse would be built nearer existing homes. The old hole number 2 and 11 became hole number 9. When the course holes were rearranged and a new third small club house was built in the 1990s.

==== Maintenance ====
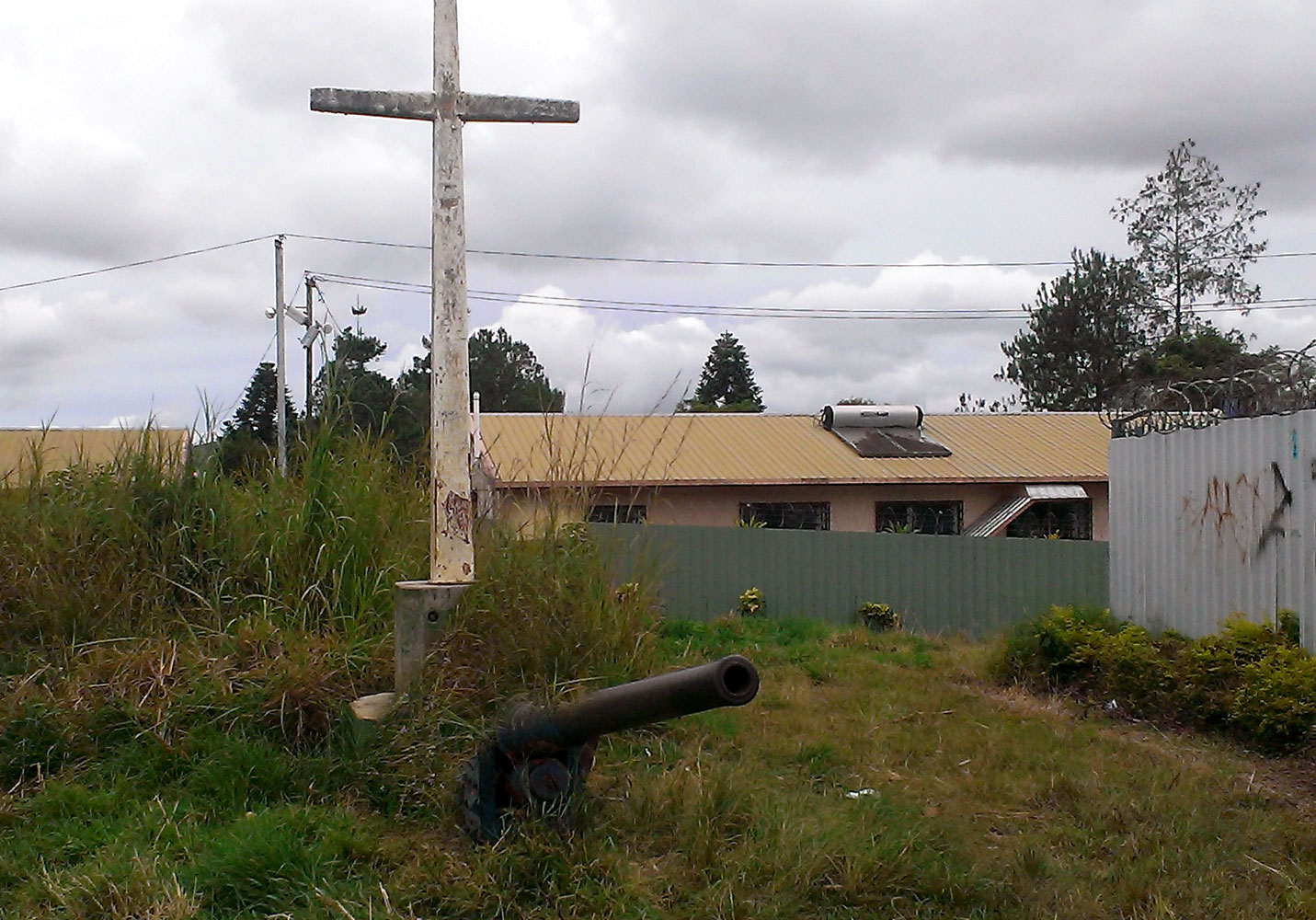
Cross of Remembrance and Japanese cannon

For many years the course has been maintained by the Kainantu Local Government Council as well as various business houses and individuals have also helped maintain the course. On occasion though, golfers have had to bring their own lawn mower to cut the tees and greens.

==== Cross of Remembrance ====
The Cross of Remembrance and a Japanese cannon, is located at the Golf Club in memory of the Australian soldiers who fought in World War Two. The cross was constructed free of charge by a former German serviceman who lived in Lae. It was officially commissioned on August 23, 1966.

Charles Micheals book, The Kainantu Cross of Remembrance contains a comprehensive account of this memorial.

==== Re-invigoration of Golf Club ====
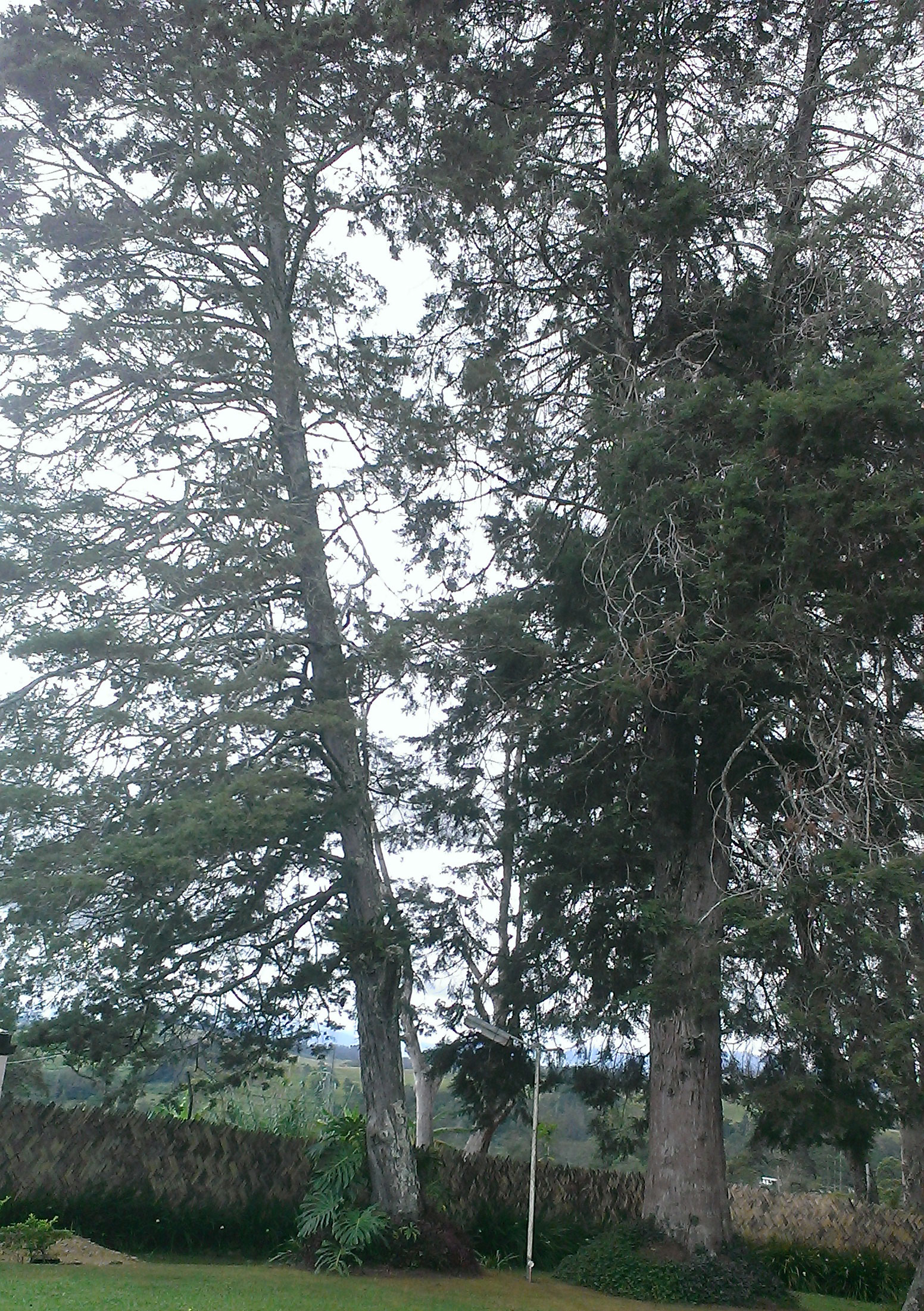
Kainantu Lodge / hotel. Christmas trees planted by Queen Elizabeth

In the early 1990s, a small group of expatriates from nearby business began to make improvements to the club including planting new trees and building a new clubhouse. The new trees did not last long and were uprooted by “rascals”and over the years existing trees were “ringed” and then cut down at night for firewood.

As a result of the Papua New Guinea policy of nationalizing workforce at the Yonki Dam, the Agricultural Station and the PNG Coffee Research Institute in the late 1990s the number of expatriates in the area decreased. Subsequently, tees, fairways and greens were not maintained and small gardens were dug into the sides of the course, dirt roads over the course constructed and at one time a house was built on one of the holes.

=== Kainantu Lodge/Hotel ===
The Kainantu Lodge or hotel has 22 units, 3 conference rooms, restaurant, lounge bar with log fire, swimming pool, tennis court, free shuttle service to/from Goroka airport According to staff at the hotel, Sir Barry Holloway established the hotel and after his death, handed the business to the Komuniti Kaunsil Bisnis to operate and distribute profits from the hotel's operation.

== Ukarumpa ==
Ukarumpa missionary station houses the Summer Institute of Linguistics, which aims to translate the Bible into all of Papua New Guinea's numerous languages. The base was established in the mid-1950s by Wycliffe Bible Translators. The current population is approximately 500.

== Gallery of Kainantu Lodge/Hotel ==
View of BBQ area	Restaurant

View of hotel from BBQ area	Public bar area

Ladies lounge	Swimming Pool	Units. "Komuniti Kaunsil Bisnis" to left	Photos in conference room. from left Patrol Officers, Queen Elizabeth as a child, visiting Elephant
