= Uniforms of the Royal Air Force =

Standardised military dress

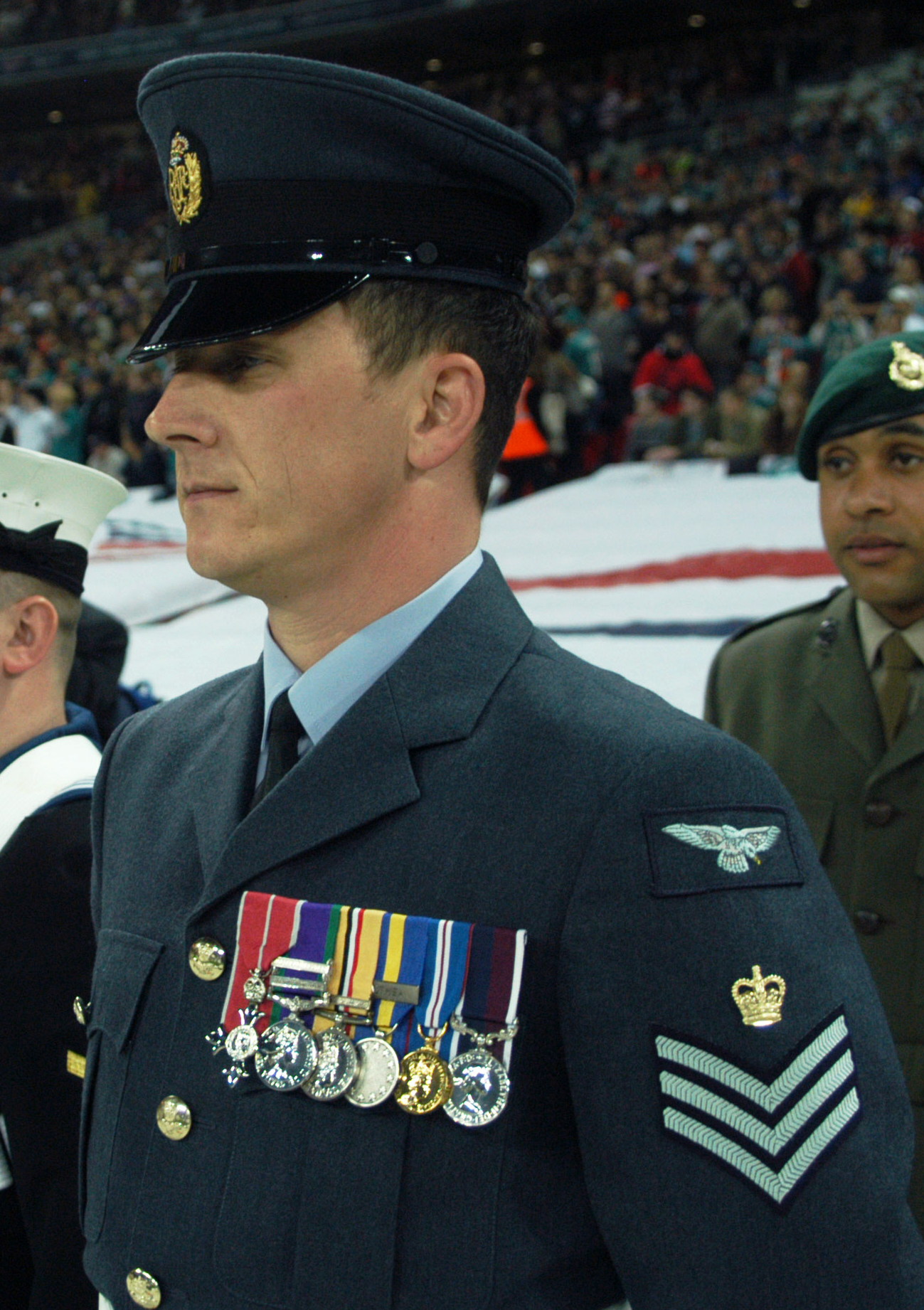
A flight sergeant in RAF service dress

The Royal Air Force uniform is the standardised military dress worn by members of the Royal Air Force. The predominant colours of Royal Air Force uniforms are blue-grey and Wedgwood blue. Many Commonwealth air forces' uniforms are also based on the RAF pattern, but with nationality shoulder flashes. The Royal Air Force Air Cadets wear similar uniforms.

== Current uniforms ==
=== Official numbering ===
The RAF currently numbers the various uniforms which may be worn. The following table summarises the numbering:

Number	Name	Notes on use
No 1	Service Dress	In temperate regions.
No 2	Service Working Dress	In temperate regions.
No 3	Operational Clothing	Different patterns for different climates.
No 4	Interim Mess Dress	For personnel without No 5 dress.
No 5	Mess Dress	In temperate regions.
No 6	Service Dress / Full Dress	In warm weather regions. In stone colour, except for 6A (full ceremonial) which is white.
No 7	Service Working Dress	In warm weather regions. In stone colour.
No 8	Mess Dress	In warm weather regions. Jacket in white.
No 9	RAF Music Services uniform	For Directors of Music, bandmasters and musicians
No 10	RAF Music Services uniform	For Directors of Music, bandmasters and musicians
No 11	RAF Music Services uniform	For Directors of Music, bandmasters and musicians
No 12	Physical Training Instructor Dress	Various patterns
No 13	Physical Training Instructor Dress - Parachute Jump Instructor Duties	With helmet or beret
No 14	Flying Clothing	Various patterns. Consists of a flight suit and optional jacket

=== Service dress ===
Media related to Service dress uniforms of the Royal Air Force at Wikimedia Commons

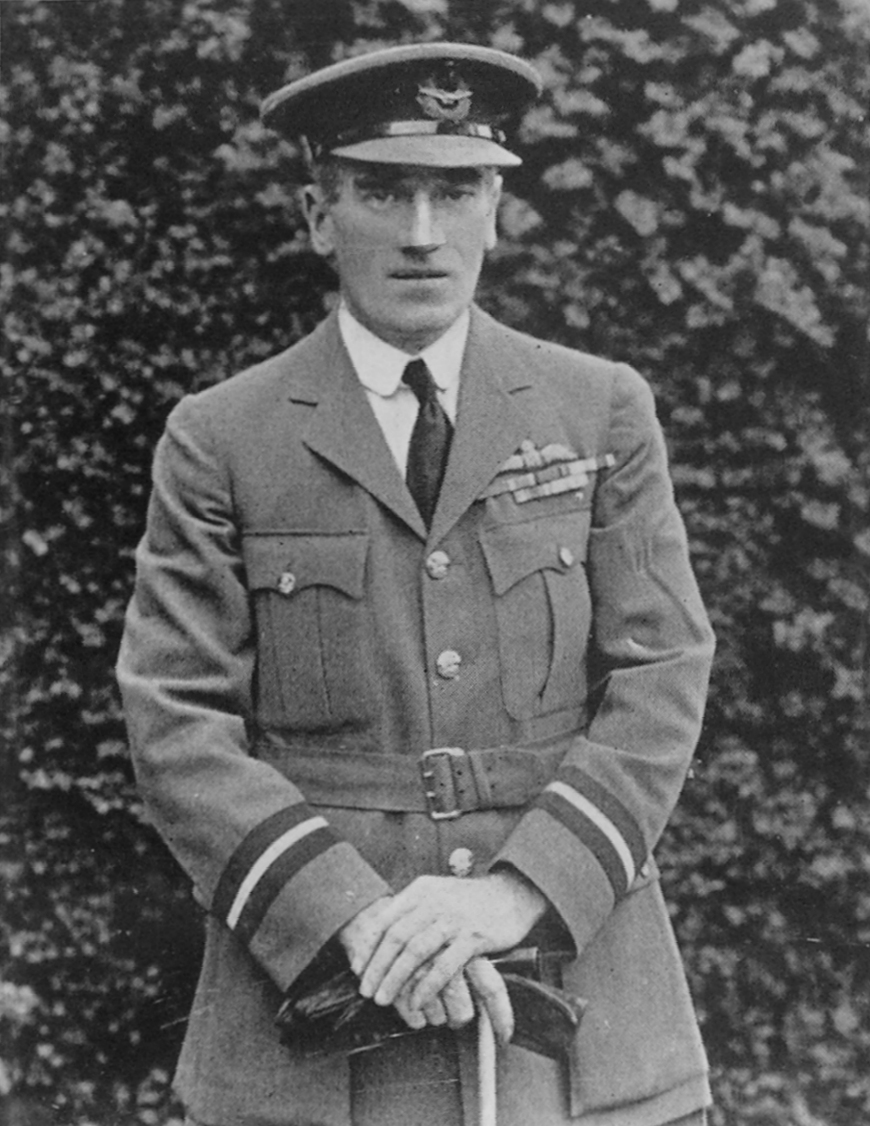
Air Commodore Francis Scarlett wearing 1920s service dress

The RAF's service dress is worn on formal and ceremonial occasions. In temperate regions, it is the most formal uniform in use at present. It remains essentially unchanged from the service dress uniform adopted in the early 1920s. It consists of a blue-grey jacket and trousers (or skirt for female personnel). A great coat may be worn at ceremonial events when the weather is cold. In warm weather regions a stone coloured variant of Service dress is worn.

In 1947, the temperate officers' services dress jacket was altered. The lower side pockets were removed and the single slit was replaced by two hacking jacket style slits. The lower button was moved up to a position behind the belt and silk embroidery flying badges were replaced with ones in bullion embroidery. These changes were unpopular and in 1951, with the exception of the lower button move, the former uniform style was re-adopted.

Service dress takes the following forms:

- No. 1 Service Dress, for temperate regions. Blue-grey colour.
- No. 1A Service Dress (Ceremonial Day Dress), for temperate regions and for air officers only. As per No. 1 Service Dress. Air vice-marshals and above wear a ceremonial sash and shoulder boards. Entitled air commodores only add the ceremonial sash.
- No. 6 Service Dress, for warm weather regions. Stone colour.
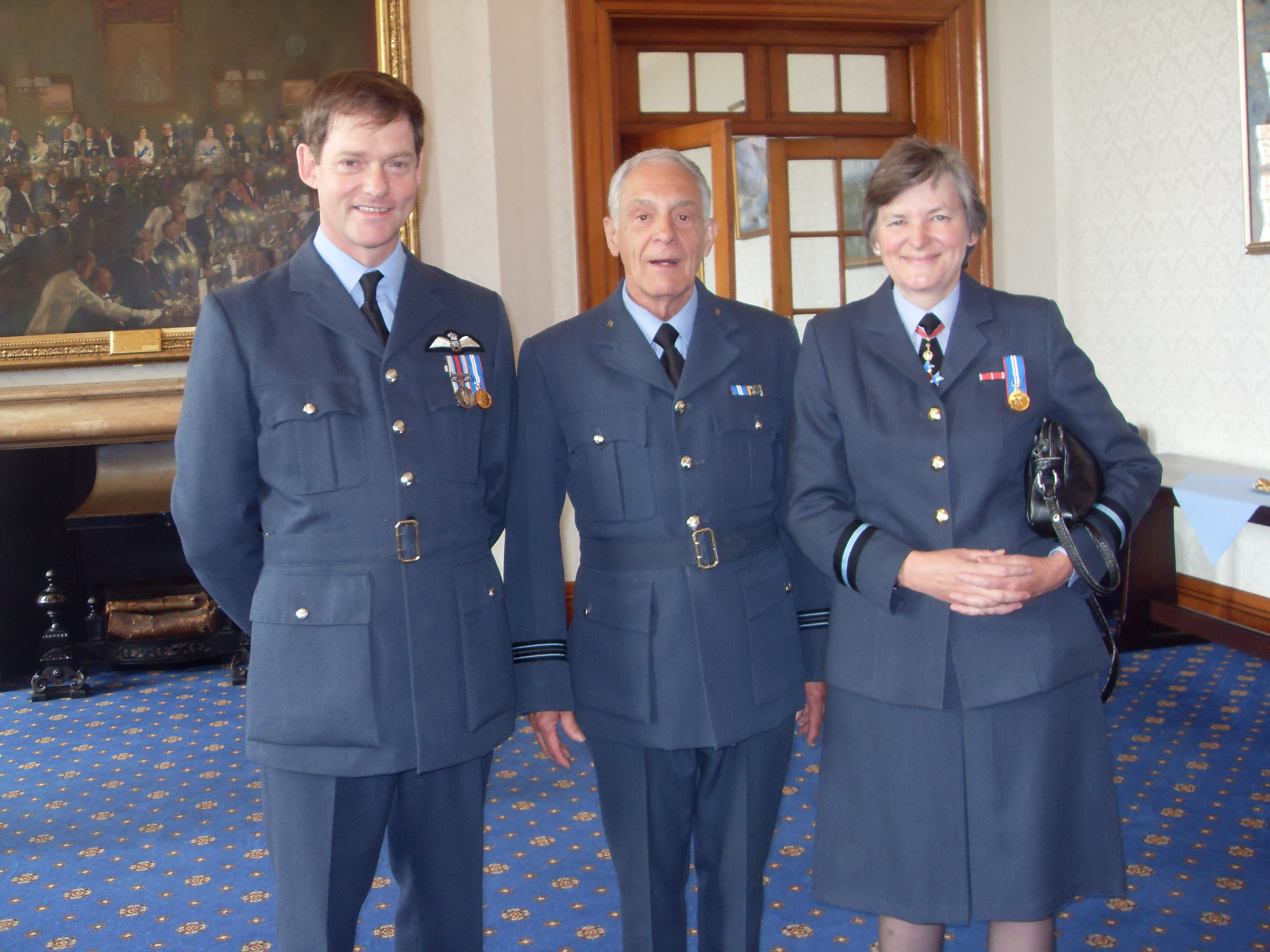
RAF officers wearing No. 1 Service Dress.

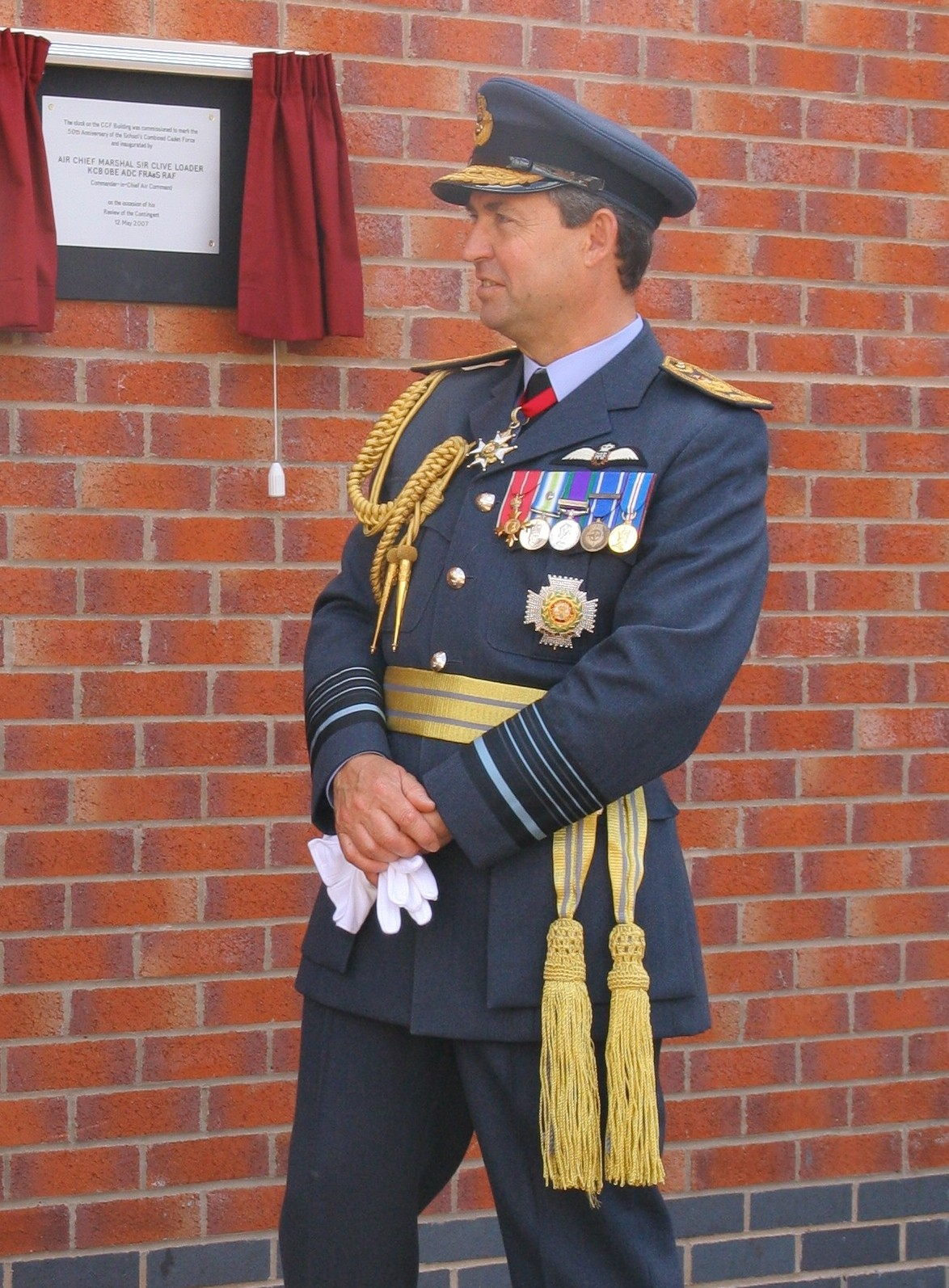
Air Chief Marshal Sir Clive Loader wearing No. 1A Service Dress (Ceremonial Day Dress).

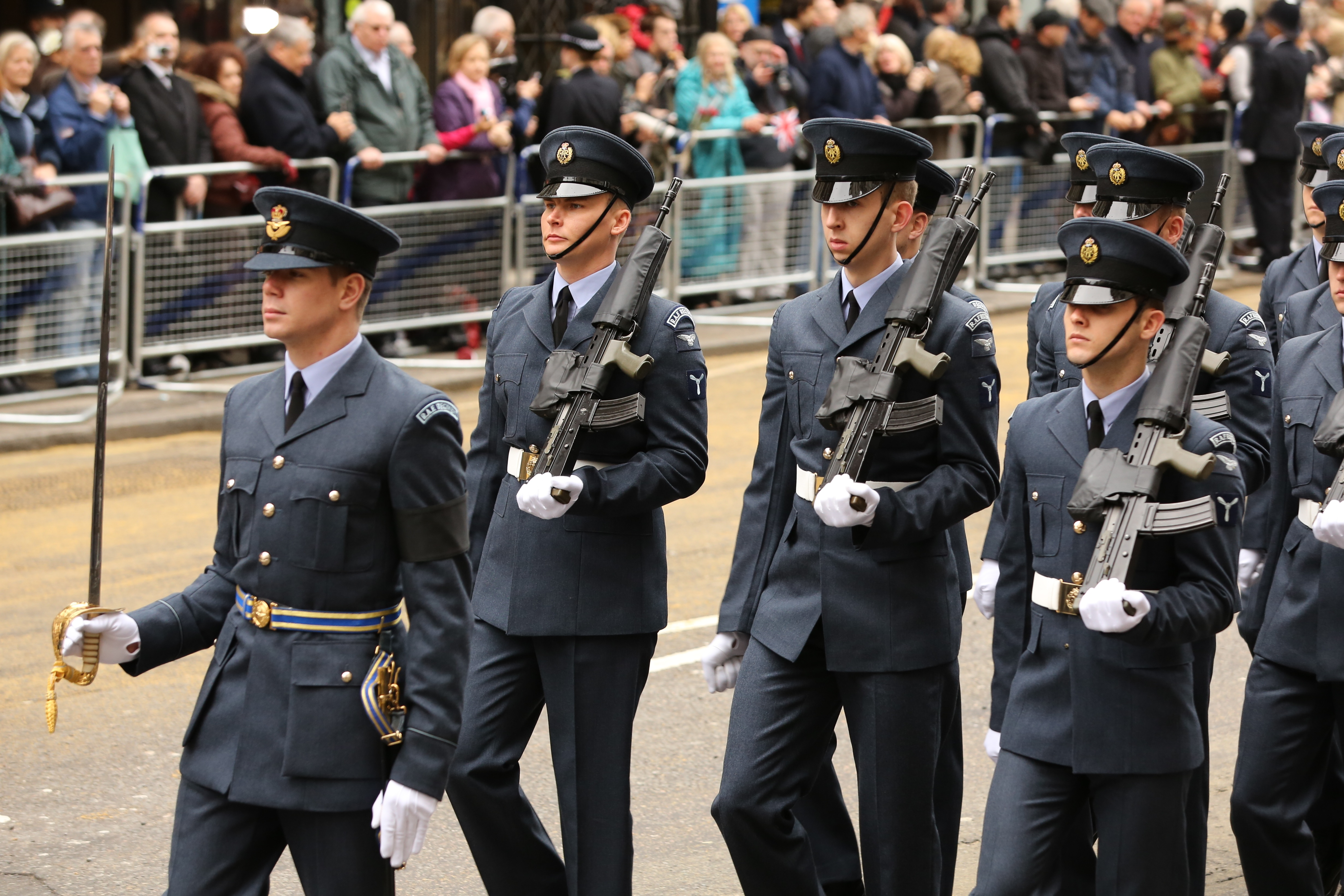
Officer (with sword belt) and men of the RAF Regiment.

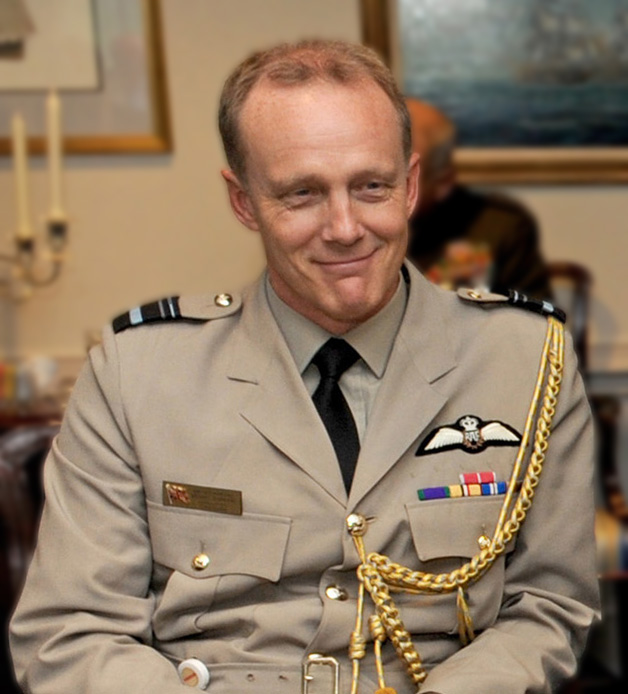
Air Vice Marshal Harwood wearing No. 6 Service Dress in 2011.

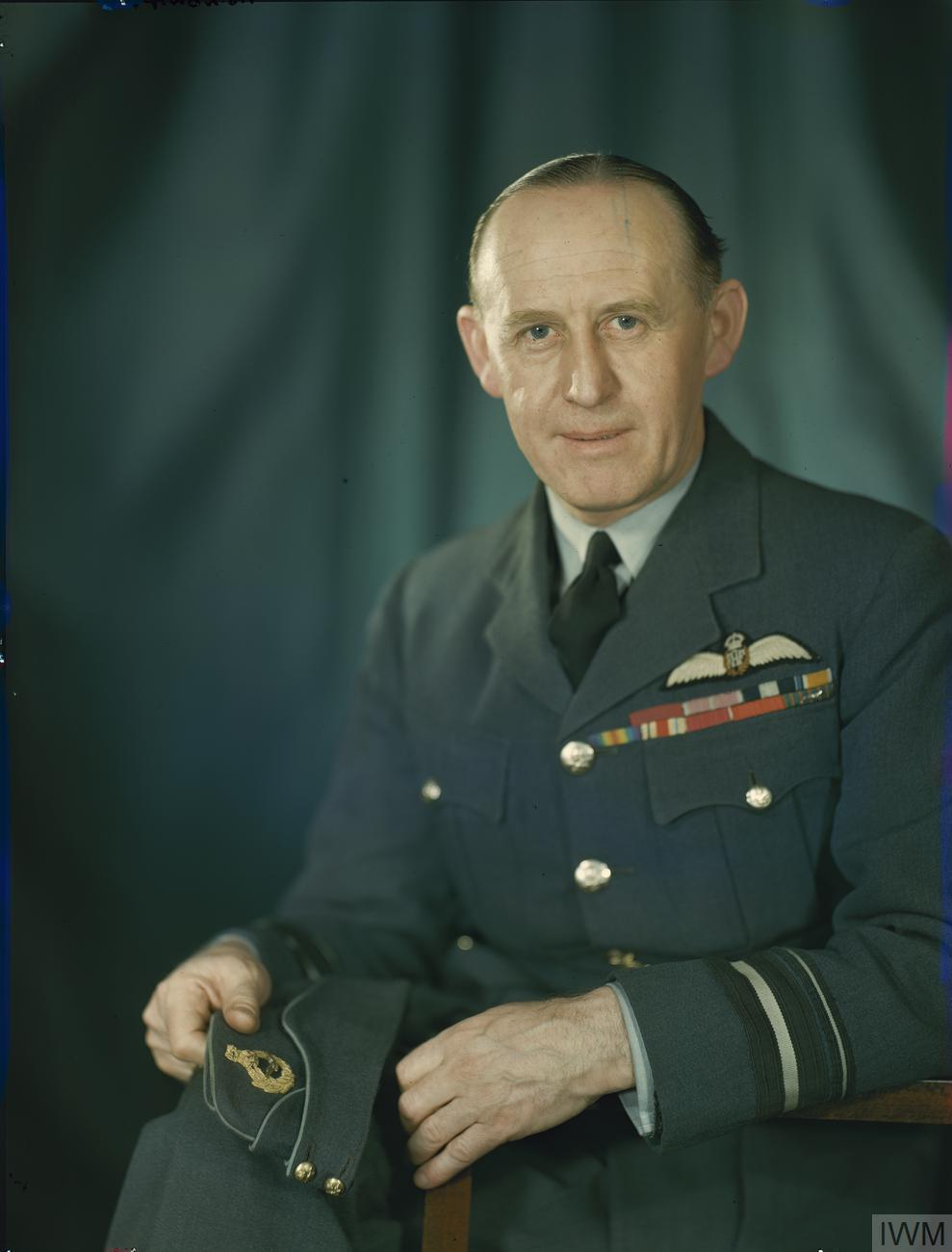
Air Vice-Marshal Philip Wigglesworth in service dress with side hat, 1944.

=== Service working dress ===
Media related to Service working dress uniforms of the Royal Air Force at Wikimedia Commons

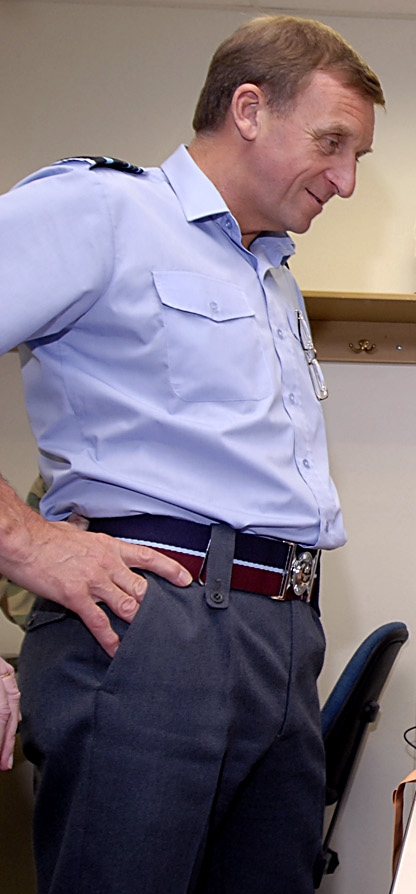
Air Marshal Sir Barry Thornton in service working dress (short sleeve order) He also wears an RAF stable belt, held in place by non-standard belt loops

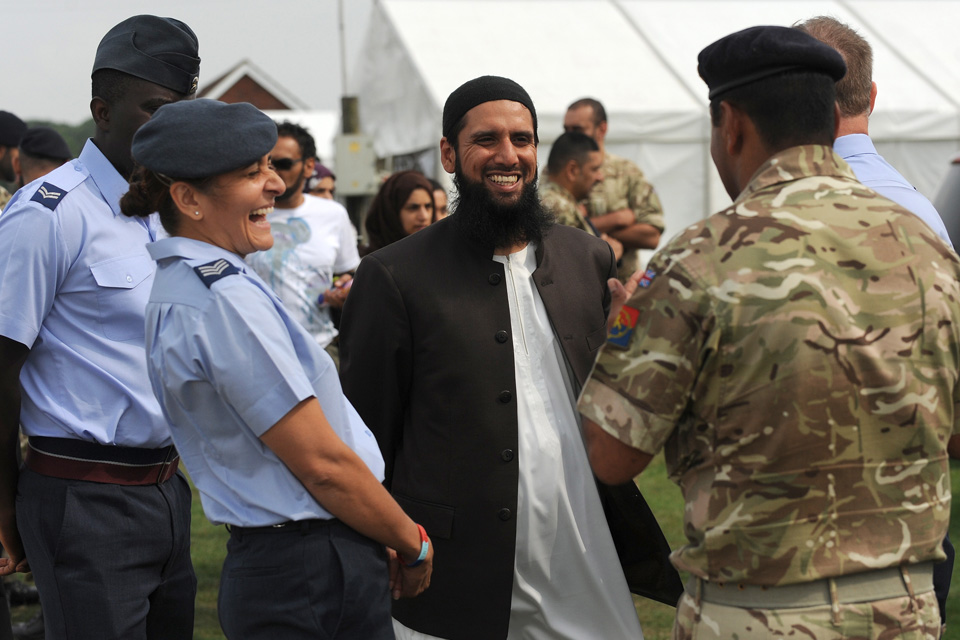
RAF personnel on the left, in 2b service working dress. One wears a forage cap and one has an RAF beret.

Service working dress, officially designated Number 2 Dress, is the routine uniform worn by most RAF personnel not on operations. It is analogous to the British Army's barrack dress. RAF service working dress comes in a number of variations:

- No 2: Long sleeve shirt with jumper and tie
- No 2a: Long sleeve shirt with tie, jumper not worn
- No 2b: Short sleeve shirt without tie, jumper not worn
- No 2c: Long sleeve dark blue shirt without tie, jumper optional (engineering trades and cadets only)

The RAF stable belt may be worn with all forms of service working dress, as can the dark blue General Purpose Jacket (GPJ).

In warm weather regions a stone coloured variant of Service working dress is worn.

=== Operational clothing ===
==== Flying duties ====
Media related to Flight suits of the Royal Air Force at Wikimedia Commons

Aircrew-specific uniforms are officially designated as Number 14 Dress by the RAF. Aircrew on flying duties wear an olive drab flying suit in temperate regions or a khaki flight suit in desert regions. A leather flying jacket, purchased at individual expense, may be worn with the flying suit but only while the wearer is on the ground.

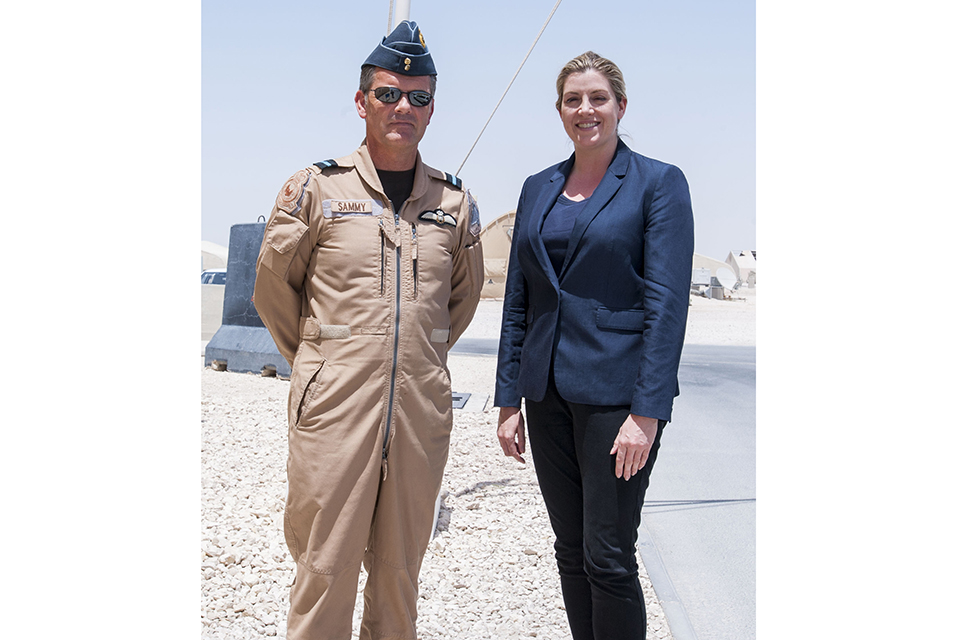
A khaki flight suit.

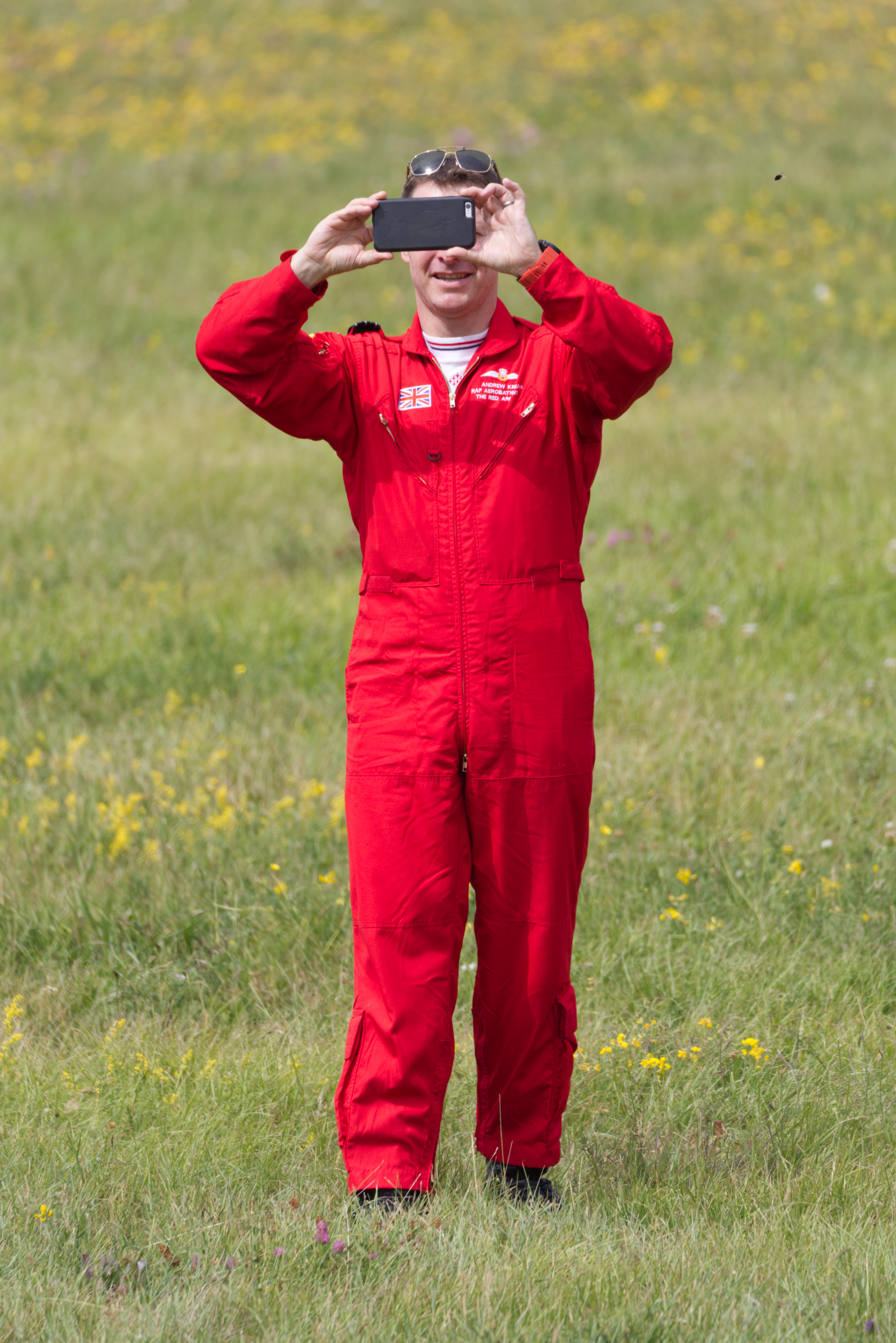
Pilots of the Red Arrows wear red flying suits.

==== Ground duties ====
RAF personnel on operations, exercise or in certain tactical formed units wear Multi-Terrain Pattern (MTP) Personal Clothing System Combat Uniform (PCS CU), a camouflage uniform. This uniform is the same as the British Army's operational uniform. This consists of PCS CU Trousers and Shirt (which is usually worn tucked in, but can be left untucked in warm climates), PCS CU smock and brown boots. A beret or the MTP-patterned, brimmed hat 'boonie' is worn as head dress. Alternatively, bush hats, similar to the bucket hat, can be worn.

In 2006 a 45mm squared tactical recognition flash was introduced for all personnel to wear on the right shoulder of operational clothing. A small rectangular identification patch/badge such as Expeditionary Air Wing (EAW), Expeditionary Air Group (EAG), Sqn insignia or red "MP" (Military Police) badge may be worn under the TRF. A Union Jack Flag is worn on the left shoulder.

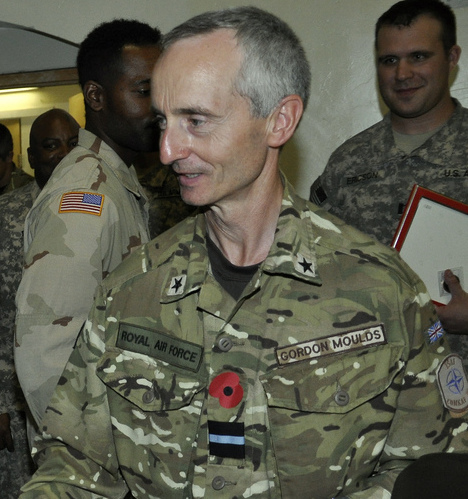
The operational clothing identity patch above the right chest pocket, on MTP uniform.

The tactical recognition flash of the RAF.

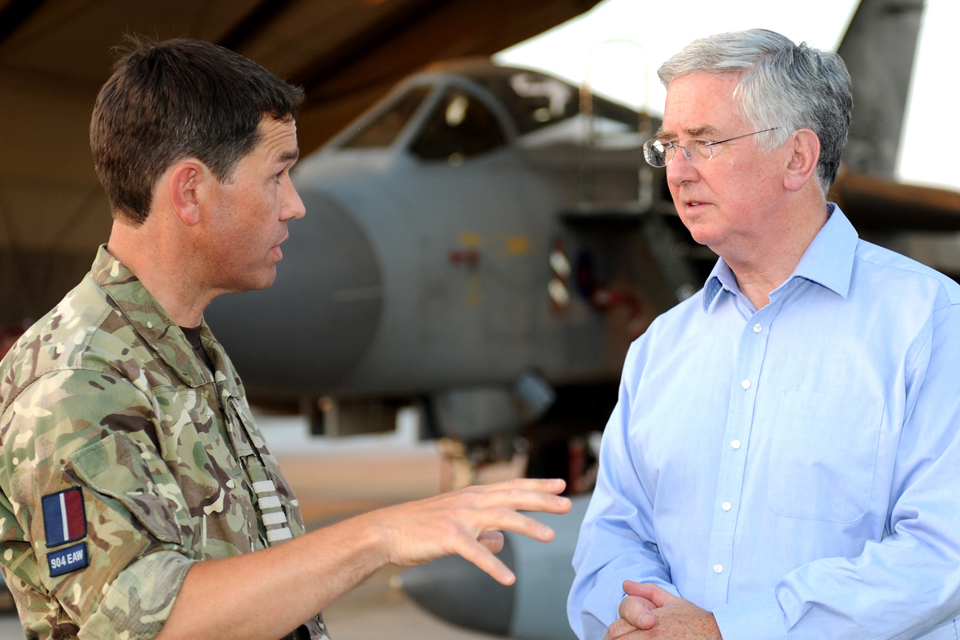
A rectangular identification badge of 904 Expeditionary Air Wing worn under the tactical recognition flash.

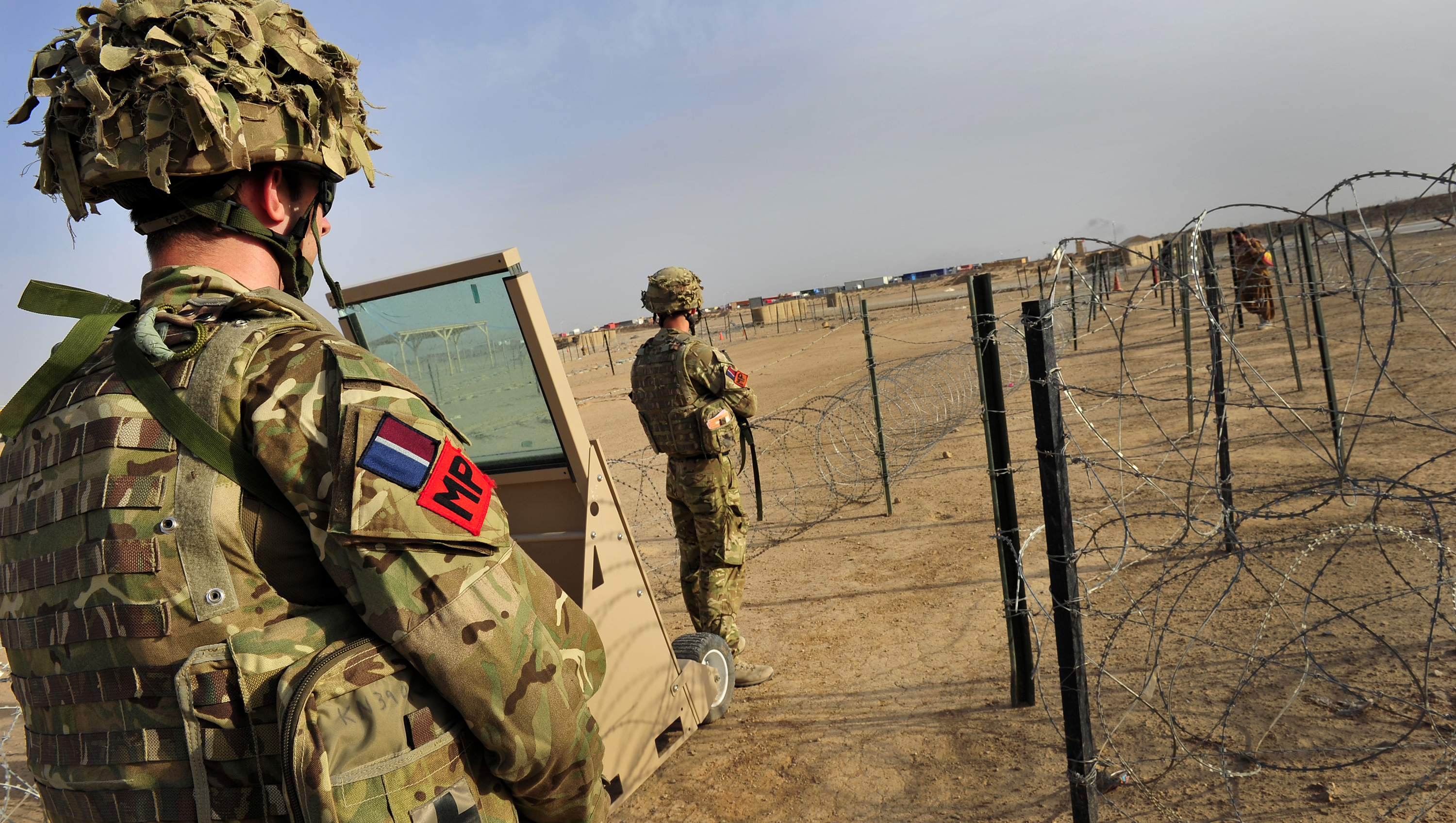
The "MP" badge under the TRF worn on MTP uniform by the Royal Air Force Police.

=== Mess dress ===
==== Current mess dress ====
Media related to Mess uniforms of the Royal Air Force at Wikimedia Commons

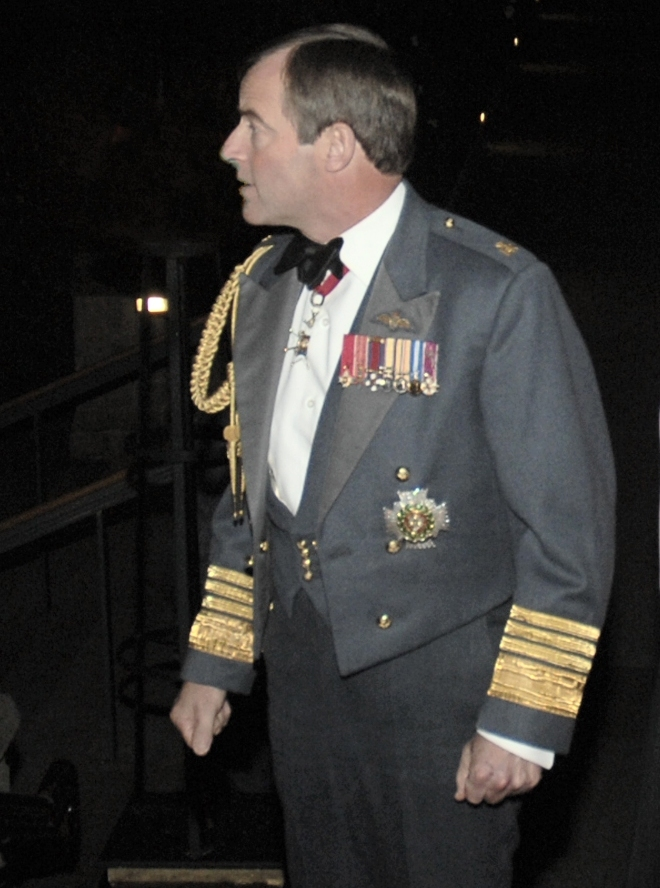
Air Chief Marshal Sir Glenn Torpy wearing No. 5B Mess Dress.

In the RAF mess dress, officially designated Number 5 dress, is worn at formal evening functions. All regular officers, Warrant Officers and Senior NCOs are issued mess dress. The current mess dress for men consists of a high waisted blue-grey single-breasted jacket fastened at the front by a single link of two RAF buttons connected by a link clip, white marcella shirt, bow tie, waistcoat or cummerbund and blue-grey trousers. Rank, for officers, is indicated in gold braid on the lower sleeve.

For women, mess dress currently consists of the same style high waisted blue-grey single-breasted jacket and white marcella shirt as men, a small bow tie and cummerbund and a straight ankle length blue-gray skirt, worn with patent-leather court shoes and barely-black tights or stockings.

Officers serving on Royal Auxiliary Air Force squadrons in Scotland may wear the Douglas Grey tartan with their mess dress. The RAF tartan was designed in 1988 and it was officially recognised by the Ministry of Defence in 2001. The tartan is worn by the RAF's voluntary pipes bands, although not as part of an official RAF uniform.

RAF personnel without No 5 dress, such as airmen, junior officer cadets and some non-regular officers, wear No 1 dress with the blue shirt and tie replaced with a white shirt (not Marcella) and black bow tie should the need to wear mess dress arise. This dress pattern is officially designated Number 4 Dress and was previously known as (Interim) Mess Dress.

==== Historic mess dress ====
The first RAF mess dress was introduced in 1920 and it featured a high waisted single-breasted blue-grey jacket which tapered to a point at the front below the waist. A blue-grey waistcoat, trousers and black shoes were also worn. Rank was indicated on shoulder boards in gold lace. This uniform was modified in 1928 when the shoes were replaced by boots and overalls with gold lace and bright blue stripes were introduced. This modified form of the uniform lasted until 1934 when it was replaced by a version similar to the current men's mess dress. The wearing of mess dress was suspended during World War II.

From the 1970s and prior to the introduction of current women's mess dress in 1996, female officers wore a royal blue"Empire line" dress made of crimplene material with a loose mandarin neck, long sleeves and an ankle length hem. Rank was indicated on a small enamelled brooch worn near the neck.

=== Full dress ===
Media related to Full dress uniforms of the Royal Air Force at Wikimedia Commons

In April 1920 Air Ministry Weekly Order 332 detailed a full dress uniform. It consisted of a single-breasted jacket in blue-grey with a stand-up collar. Rank was indicated in gold braid on the lower sleeve and white gloves were worn.

Initially the full dress uniform was worn with the service dress cap. However, in 1921 a new form of head-dress was introduced. It was designed to resemble the original flying helmet and it consisted of a leather skull cap trimmed with black rabbit fur. The helmet also featured an ostrich feather plume which was connected at an RAF badge. This helmet was never popular and junior officers were eventually permitted to wear the service dress hat on full dress occasions.

Group Captain the Duke of York (later King George VI) wore RAF full dress at his wedding to Lady Elizabeth Bowes-Lyon in 1923. The Duke wore or carried the full dress headgear rather than the service dress cap.

The wearing of the full dress uniform was suspended just prior to the outbreak of World War II. Although the uniform was occasionally worn by air officers as late as the 1950s, its use was never officially re-instated. Today the blue-grey full dress uniform is no longer worn, except in a modified form by RAF bandsmen. This uniform is; from 2012, worn with the peaked cap rather than the busby; and is now referred to as Number 9 Service Dress.

There is also a full dress uniform for use by officers in the tropics, officially designated as No.6A Full Ceremonial Dress (Warm Weather Areas). It consists of a white tunic with stand collar, matching trousers, blue-grey peaked cap and black leather shoes. It is only issued to specific appointment holders (e.g. aide-de-camp and air attaché), and even then these are hardly ever worn. Other officers may purchase the uniform at their own expense but few choose to do so.

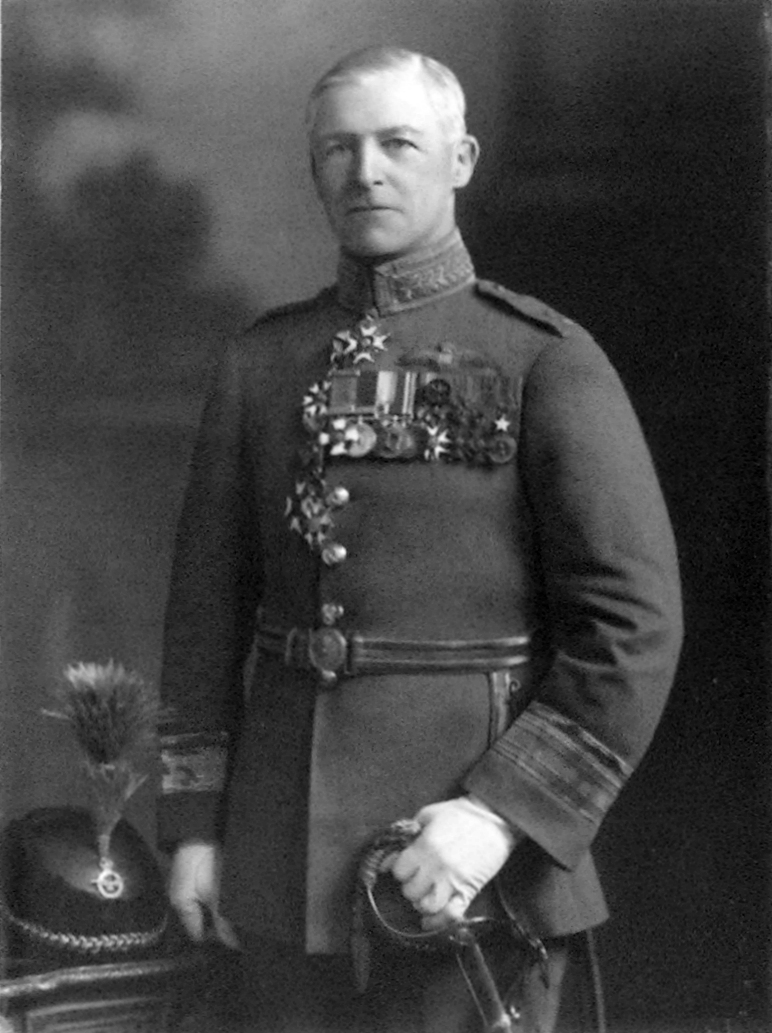
Air Vice-Marshal Lambe wearing full dress

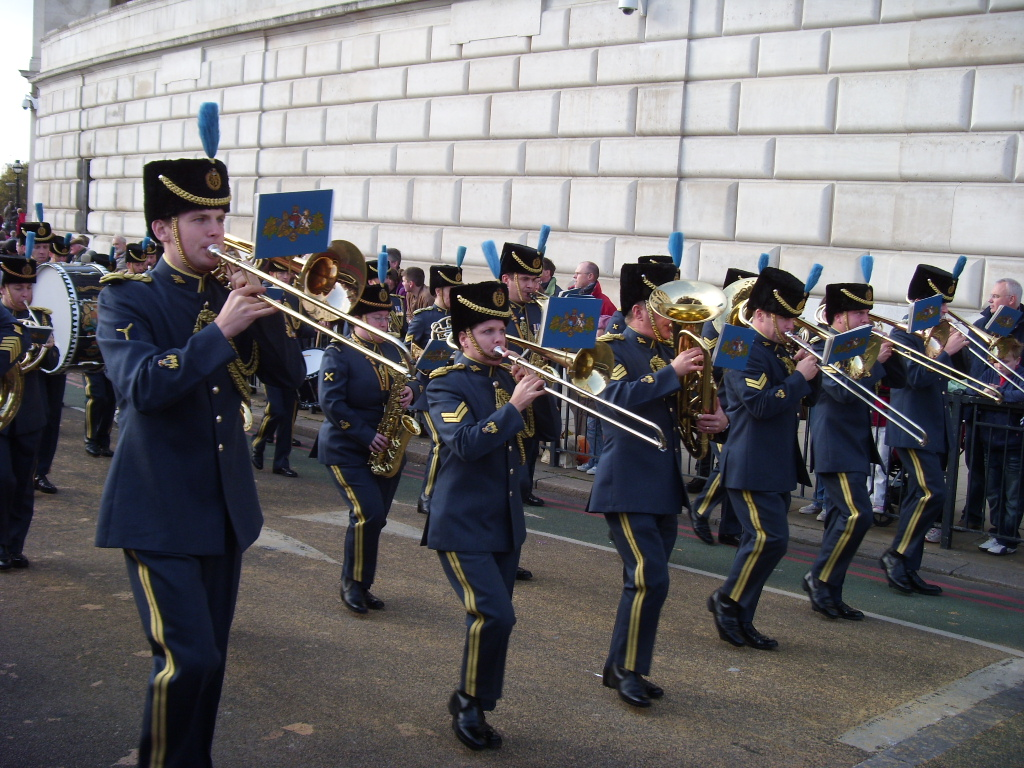
The band of the Royal Air Force wearing number 9 Service Dress, as worn with a busby before 2012

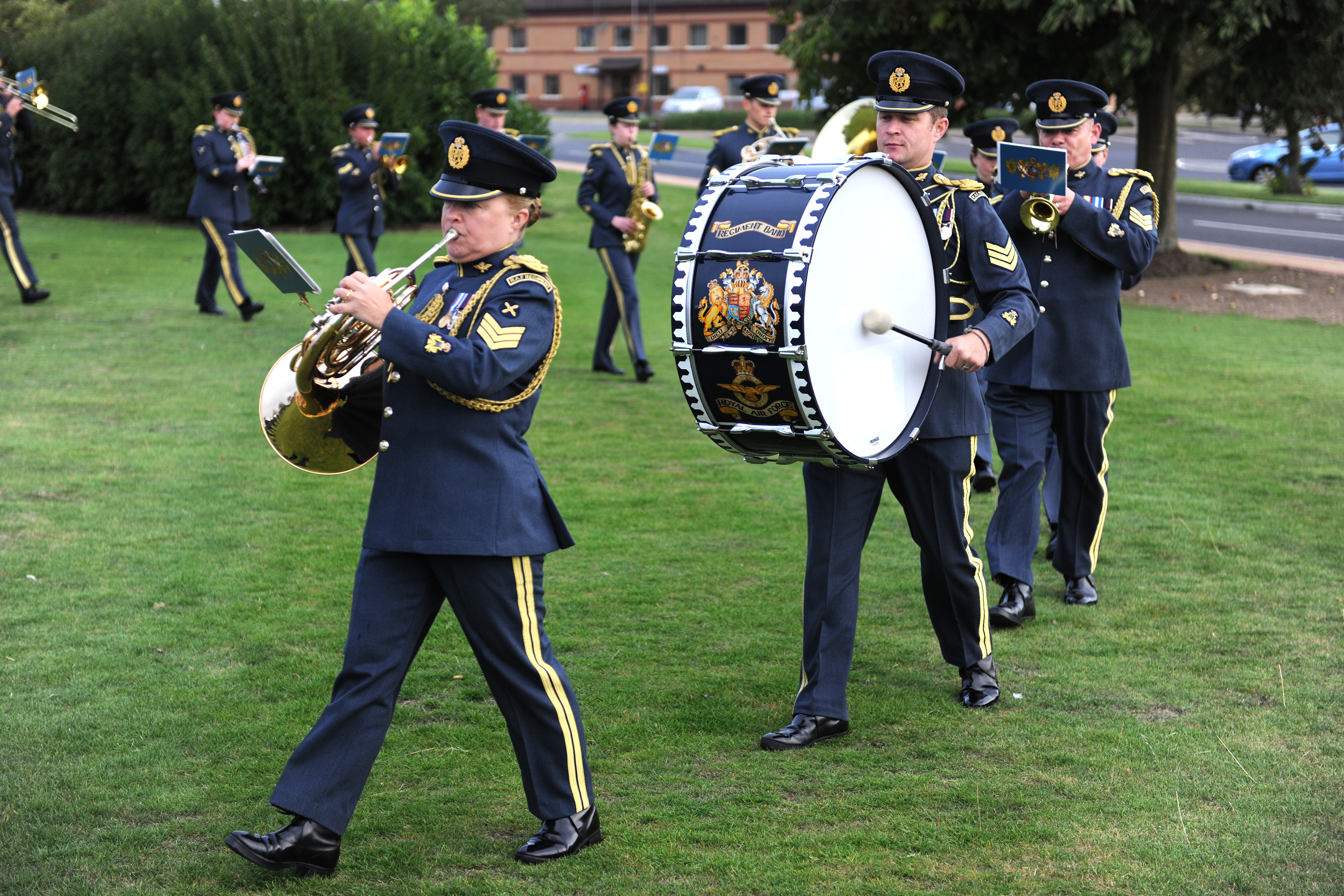
The band of the Royal Air Force Regiment wearing number 9 Service Dress, as now worn with a peaked cap since 2012

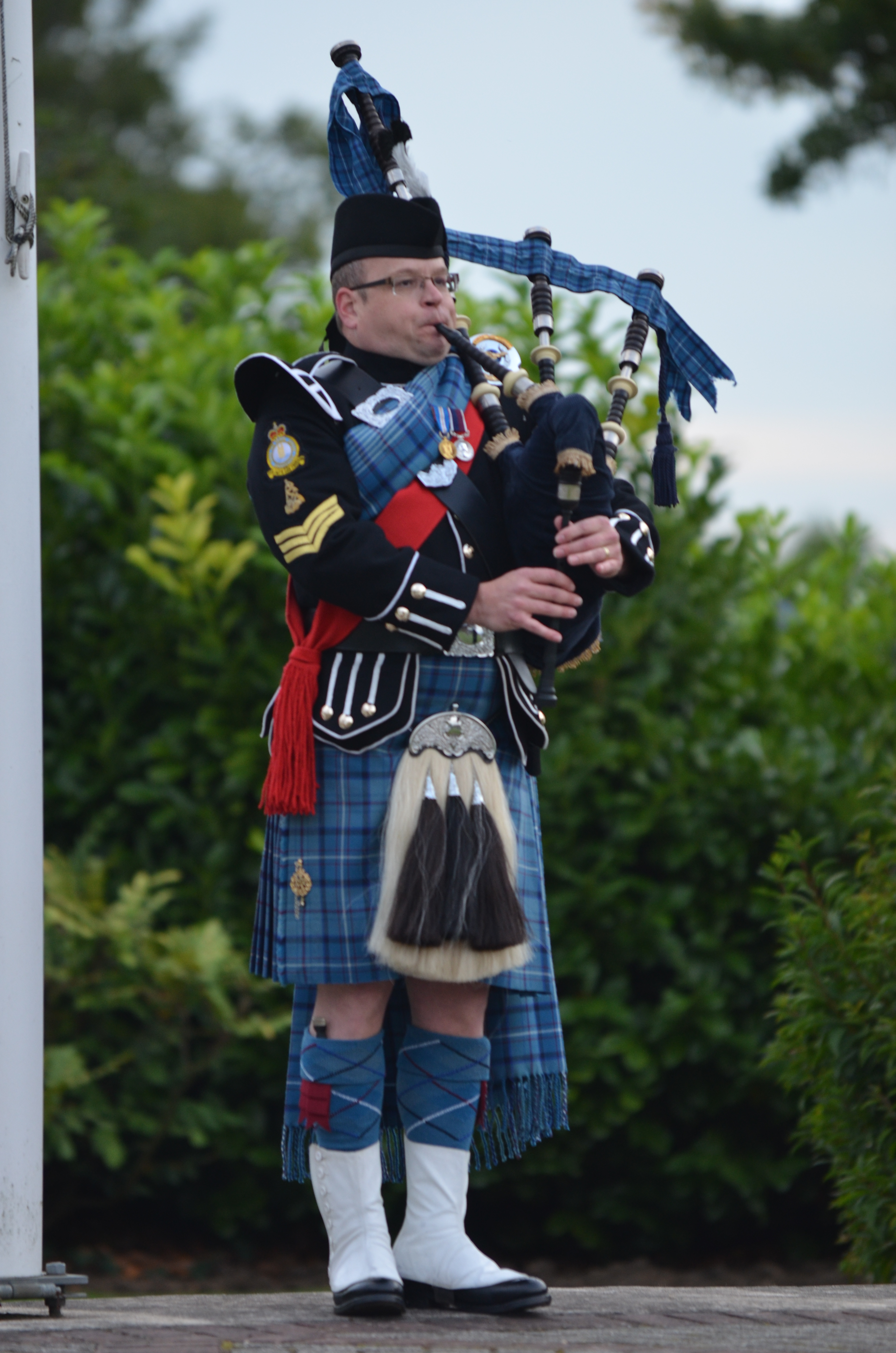
Sergeant Piper in Highland Dress. Introduced in 2004, the Royal Air Force Tartan is worn by the five bands of the RAF Pipes and Drums

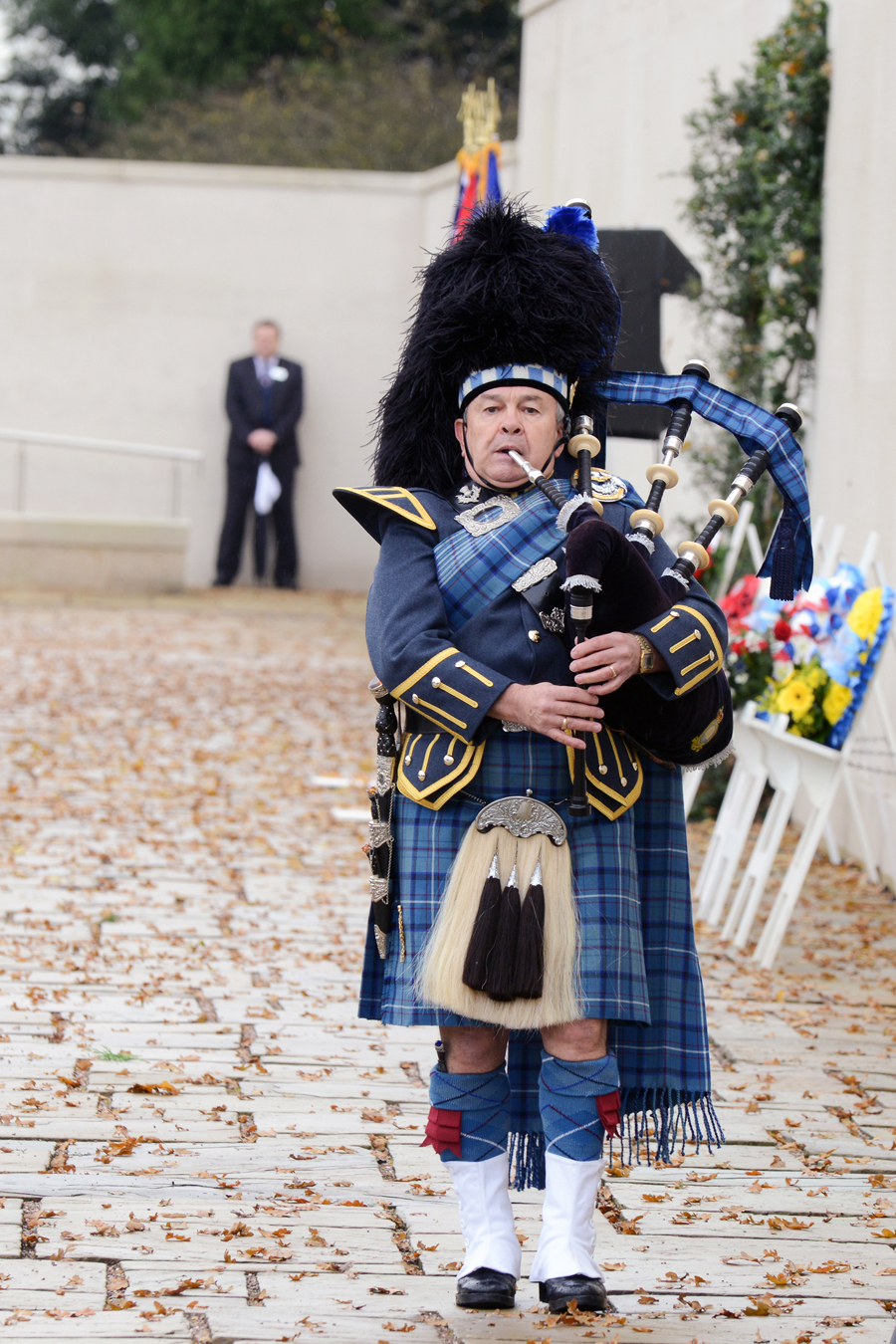
Piper in full Highland Dress with Feather Bonnet in place of Glengarry and blue-grey Doublet with gold braid in place of black with silver braid

== Historic uniforms ==
=== Initial uniform ===
With the establishment of the Royal Air Force as an independent service on 1 April 1918, orders were issued detailing new uniform patterns. Major General Mark Kerr designed the first officer uniform which was largely pale blue with gold braid trimmings. Additionally, the Royal Flying Corps' use of khaki was continued. It has been suggested that the pale blue colour was adopted as the cloth had been intended for use by the Imperial Russian Cavalry and, following their disbandment after the Bolshevik Revolution it became available at low cost. As it was the responsibility of officers to buy their own uniforms, a wearing-out period for old uniforms was allowed and the change-over to the air force uniform was slow.

The 'wearing out' period also applied to other ranks. Former members of the Royal Flying Corps and the Royal Naval Air Service continued to wear their old uniforms. New recruits into the newly formed Royal Air Force were often issued with the dark khaki Army Pattern General Service Tunic. Later in 1918 a belted khaki uniform was adopted for other ranks, and it was these tunics that first carried the RAF eagle badges on each shoulder.

The pale blue colour for officers' uniforms was unpopular and impractical and John Slessor who was later promoted to Marshal of the RAF described it as "a nasty pale blue with a lot of gold over it, which brought irresistibly to mind a vision of the gentlemen who stands outside the cinema". A little over a year after its introduction, the pale blue colour was discontinued. On 15 September 1919, Air Ministry Order 1049 replaced it with the blue-grey colour which has remained in use to this day. The khaki uniform continued to be worn until 1924 when it too was replaced by a blue-grey colour.

=== War service dress ===
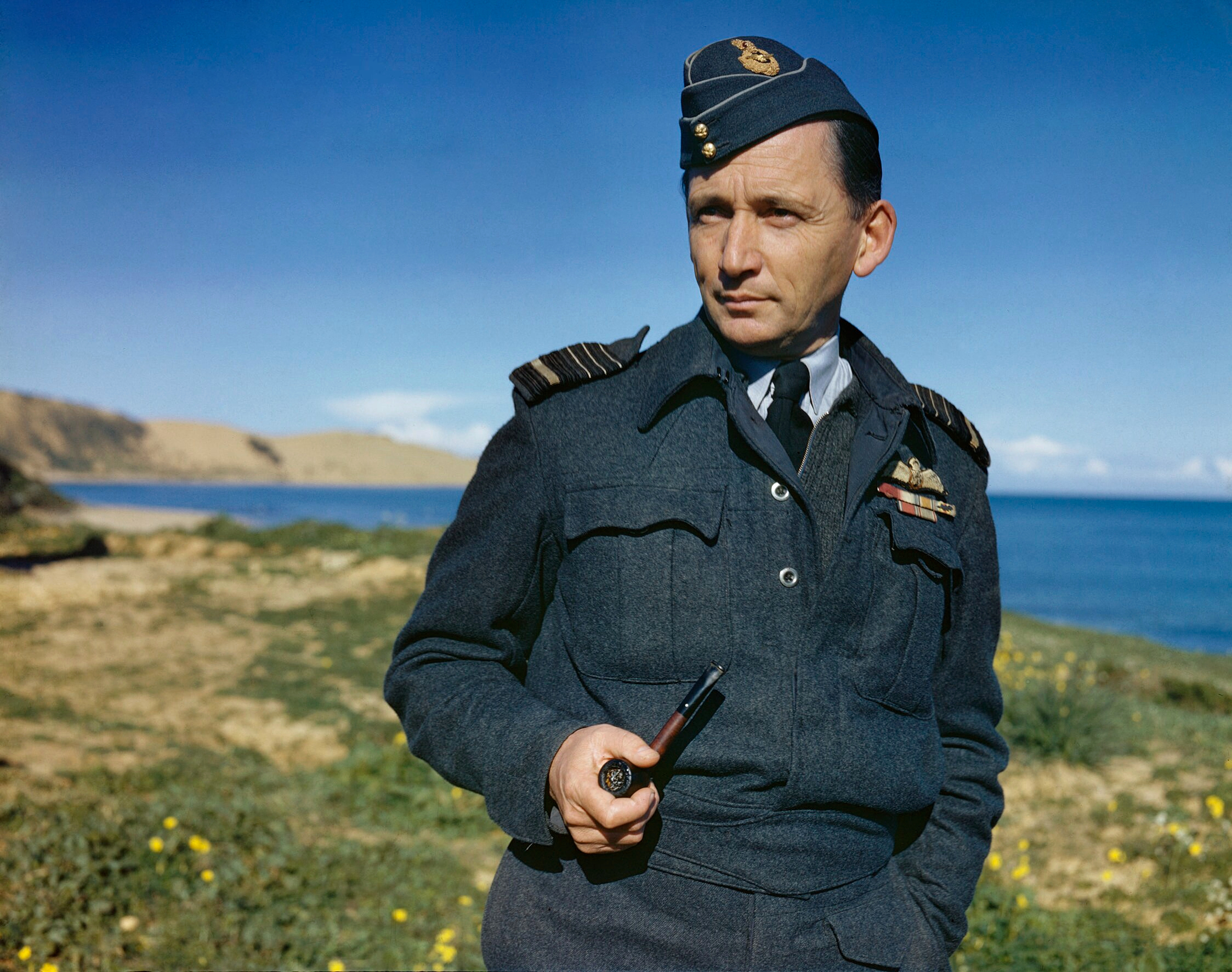
Air Chief Marshal Tedder wearing war service dress

War service dress, also known as battle dress, was introduced in 1940 as a blue/grey version of the British Army's Battledress. Initially, war service dress was only worn by air crew. However, in 1943, its use was authorised for all ranks and trades. War service dress continued to be worn after the end of World War II. It was significantly altered in 1948 and not phased out until 1976.

=== Later changes in service dress ===
Air force rumour later had it that the "air force blue" colour of the postwar uniform had been that of a textile produced in quantity to clothe Russian soldiers during the First World War, and not yet exported when the Russian revolution of 1917 closed that market.

A visible distinction between the RAF and the other military services was that all ranks wore a starched collar and tie. Up to 1918, only Officers of the British Army and Royal Navy wore neck-ties; and Officers of all services bought their uniforms from military tailors, while other servicemen were issued clothing from government stocks. Several features of the RAF uniform distinguished officers from airmen; their cap badges were different, airmen's being all brass while officers' were gold-embroidered fabric; airmen wore the RAF eagle patch on both shoulders while officers did not; and the fabric of airmen's wool uniforms was thick and heavy, while officers' uniforms were of "smooth blue" barathea fabric. Another distinction was that while the British Army shod its men only in ankle-high boots the RAF after 1945 also issued its airmen with ordinary shoes for everyday working wear. The shoes maintained the class distinction in that only officers wore shoes with toecaps. Similarly, officers wore unlined brown leather gloves while airmen's gloves were of knitted wool.

"Smooth blue" uniforms for non-commissioned personnel were introduced in the 1950s, first for Warrant Officers. By 1956 NCOs of all ranks (corporal and up) were permitted to buy "smooth blue" uniforms at their own expense. Another innovation of the period was raincoats, hitherto worn only by officers. Despite the rainy British climate, the only weather protection for airmen outdoors was either their heavy winter overcoats or the rectangular ground sheets issued for all soldiers' use on campaign. Regulations were altered in the 1950s to allow airmen to wear raincoats bought at their own expense.

During 1975/6 the wartime "Hairy Mary" working dress uniforms were replaced for all ranks with the 1971 pattern No 2 uniforms. Made of a smooth woollen and man-made fibre mix material the jacket was a loose blouson design with a front zip fastener and epaulettes, often referred to as a 'Thunderbird jacket'. In the mid-1980s RAF blue crew-necked woollen pullovers were replaced with a new V-neck design featuring blue-grey cloth elbow and shoulder patches plus a pen holder patch on the left sleeve. The Thunderbird Jacket was withdrawn in the 1990s and replaced with an additional pullover, the design reverting to a round neck but retaining the pen holder, the official description being Jersey Man's (Woman's) Blue Grey Round Neck.

In the 1990s an RAF blue nylon foul weather jacket and overtrousers were issued. Although not initially intended it quickly became standard practice for officers and other ranks to attach rank badges to the lapels and wear the nylon jacket in place of the uniform raincoat, as a more practical modern wear.

=== Disruptive Pattern Material ===
Disruptive Pattern Material (DPM) was the combat uniform in RAF use until 2010, when Multi-Terrain Pattern (MTP) uniforms began replacing it.

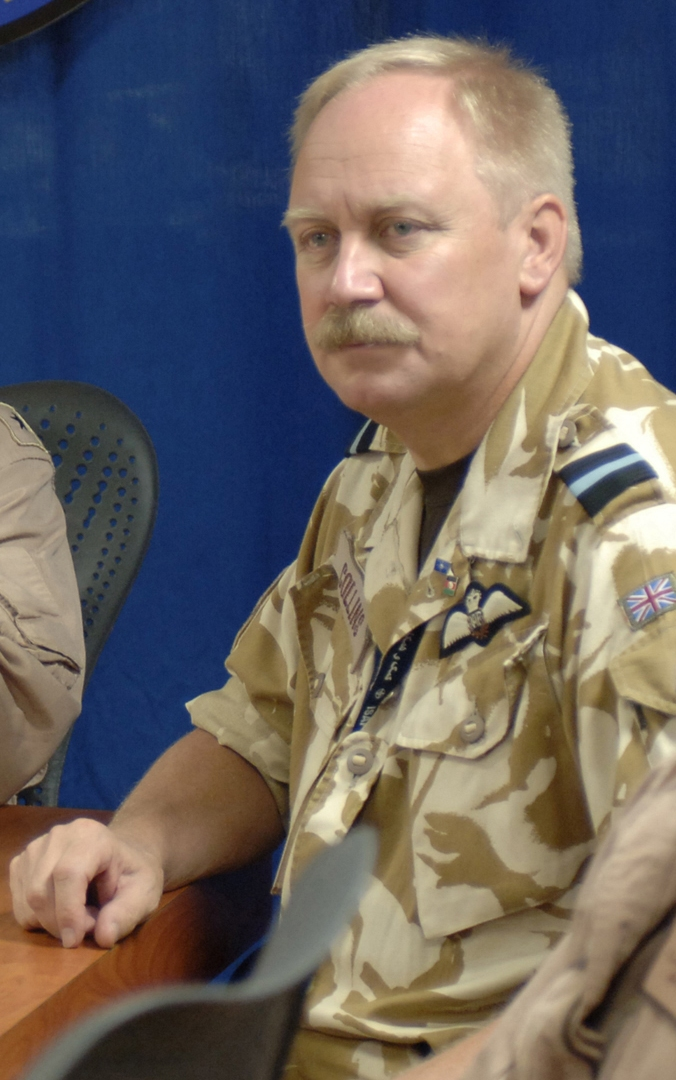
Desert Combat Dress, as worn by Air Commodore Bryan Collins.

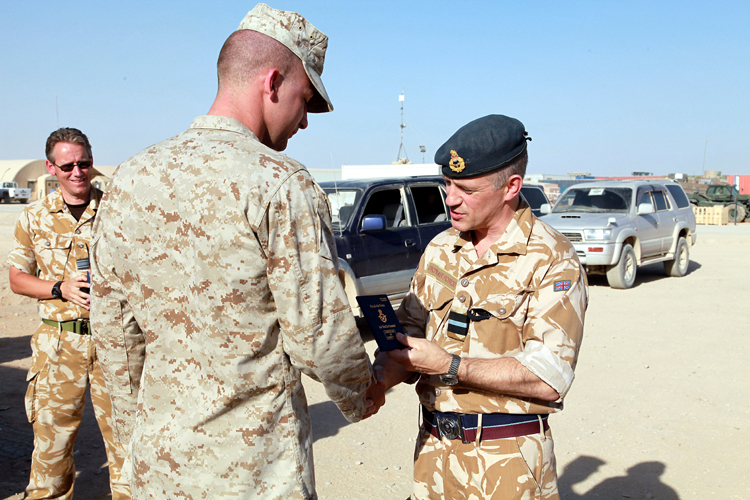
Desert Combat Dress worn with an RAF beret and stable belt.

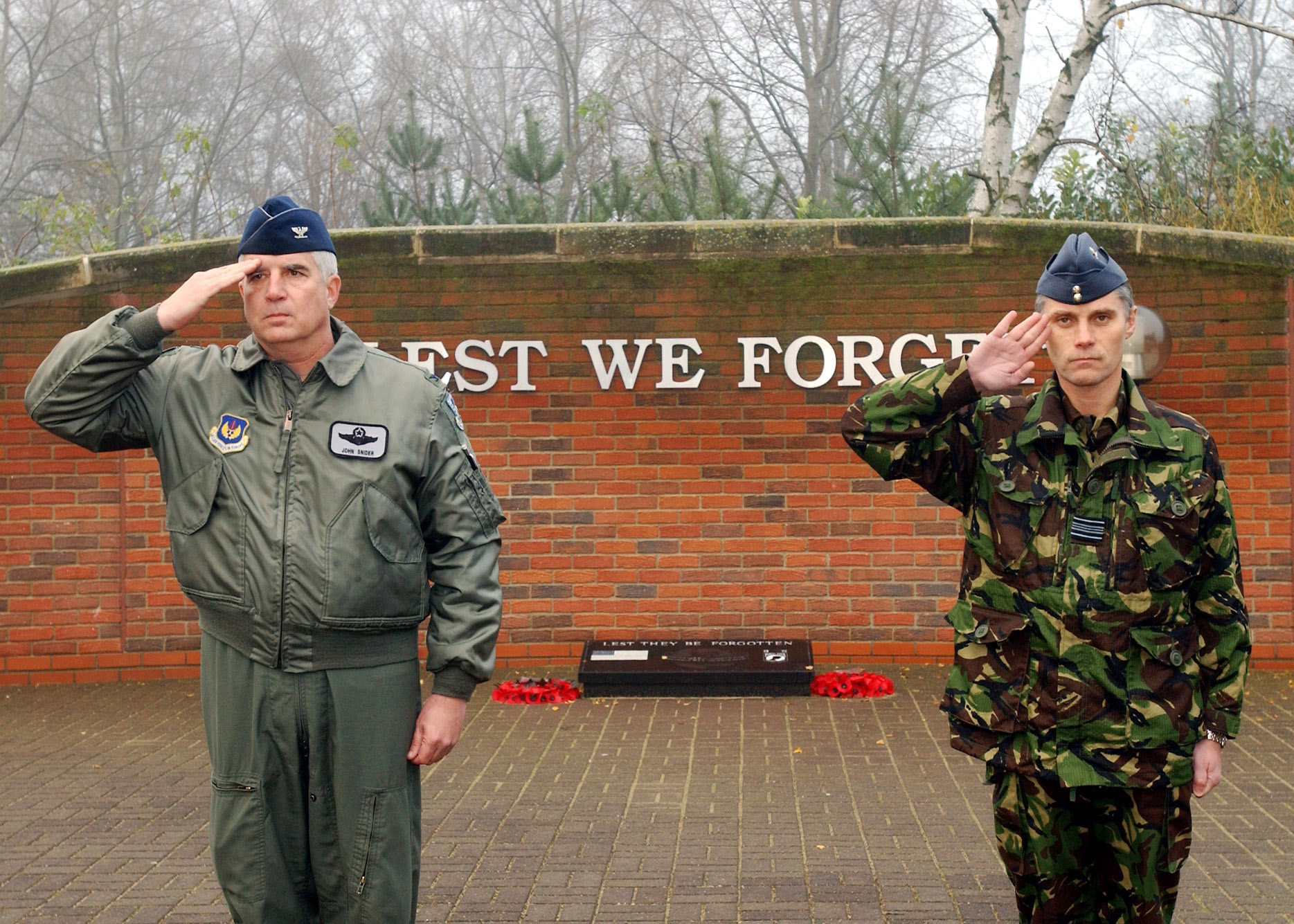
Temperate Combat Dress variant of DPM on the right.

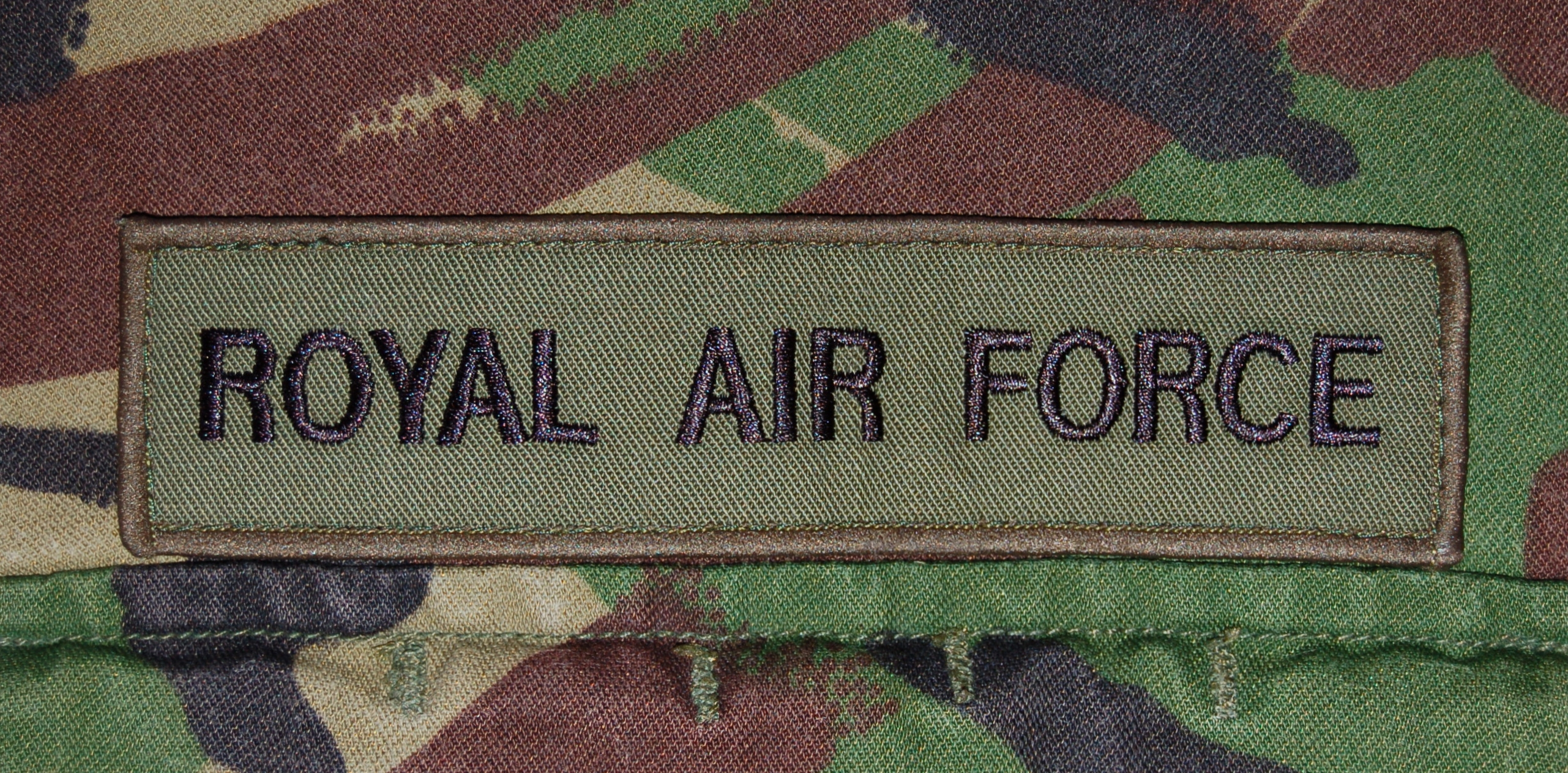
The operational clothing identity badge on temperate DPM uniform.

== Ranks and insignia ==
The Royal Air Force ranks and insignia form part of the uniform of the Royal Air Force. Royal Air Force rank insignia were based on combination of those of the Royal Navy officer rank insignia and British Army.

Rank insignia of the commissioned officers of the Royal Air Force
Rank group	Officers of air rank					Senior officers			Junior officers			Officer cadets
NATO code	OF-10	OF-9	OF-8	OF-7	OF-6	OF-5	OF-4	OF-3	OF-2	OF-1		N/A
Insignia												
Rank	Marshal of the Royal Air Force	Air chief marshal	Air marshal	Air vice-marshal	Air commodore	Group captain	Wing commander	Squadron leader	Flight lieutenant	Flying officer	Pilot officer	Officer cadet
Abbreviation	MRAF	Air Chf Mshl	Air Mshl	AVM	Air Cdre	Gp Capt	Wg Cdr	Sqn Ldr	Flt Lt	Fg Off	Plt Off	Off Cdt

Rank insignia of the other ranks of the Royal Air Force
Rank group	Warrant officers	Senior NCOs				Junior NCOs		Aviators			
NATO code	OR-9	OR-7		OR-6	OR-5	OR-4	OR-3	OR-2			OR-1
Insignia											No insignia
Typical appointment	Warrant officer of the Royal Air Force										
Rank	Warrant officer	Flight sergeant	Chief technician	Sergeant		Corporal	Lance corporal (RAF Regiment)	Air specialist (class 1) technician	Air specialist (class 1)	Air specialist (class 2)	Air recruit
Abbreviation	WO	FS	Chf Tech	Sgt		Cpl	LCpl	AS1(T)	AS1	AS2	AR
Aircrew insignia						No equivalent					
Rank	Master aircrew	Flight sergeant aircrew		Sergeant aircrew		No equivalent					
Abbreviation	MAcr	FSAcr		SAcr		No equivalent					

=== Aircrew Flying Badges ===
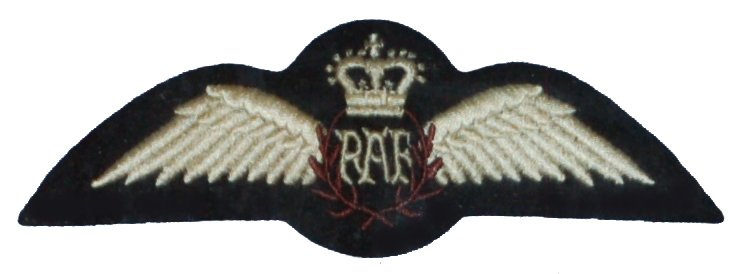
Badge/Brevet of Royal Air Force Pilot

Aircrew Flying Badges are qualification badges worn on the left breast, above any medals, by personnel in the RAF who have passed certain qualifications and criteria. The Royal Air Force currently issues three different flying badges, though older discontinued badges may continue to be worn. These three flying badges are:

- Pilots badge: the letters "RAF" in a brown laurel wreath, surmounted by St Edwards crown, with a swift's wing either side.
- Weapon System Operators: the letters "RAF" in a brown laurel wreath, surmounted by a crown, with a single swift's wing on one side.
- Airborne Specialists: a half wing, without crown and 2 letters in the centre. The letters correspond to a role, e.g. 'AT' - Airborne Technician.

As of 2021, Qualified Space Personnel wear 'UK Space Wings': a silver delta, an orbit ellipse, and a constellation of stars in a blue laurel wreath; with a single silver swift's wing on one side. The constellation is representative of Aries, referencing the date 1 April when UK Space Command was stood up. These badges are similar to flying badges, and are worn in the same way, but are actually qualification badges.

Members of the RAFVR involved in flying with the Royal Air Force Air Cadets wear their own version of the Pilots Badge, for Air Experience Flight Pilots, and Glider Pilots.

== Influence on other organisations ==
=== Air Forces ===
The Royal New Zealand Air Force uniform is also of the RAF pattern, but with nationality shoulder flashes. The Indian Air Force uniform is also of a similar pattern to the RAF uniform. The Royal Australian Air Force uniform is in midnight blue, instead of grey-blue. The Pakistan Air Force uniform was nearly identical to that of the RAF, but with nationality shoulder flashes, nationality emblems and the uniform changed in preference of Sherwani. Until 1987, the PAF's uniform is also of the RAF pattern (No. 6 Service Dress-based but RAF's symbols has been replaced with nationality symbols). Prior to the 1968 unification of the Canadian Forces, the Royal Canadian Air Force service dress was nearly identical to that of the RAF. In 1986 Distinctive Environmental Uniforms (DEU) were introduced to the Canadian Forces and the Air Command (now once again known as the Royal Canadian Air Force) variant maintains some similarity with the RAF's uniform. Until 2014, the RCAF DEU retained the gold sleeve rings (for officers), chevrons (for non-commissioned personnel) and crowns/Royal Arms Of Canada (for warrant officers). On 24 September 2014, the RCAF announced it would return in part to pre-unification RAF-styled insignia; however, with the exception of Private being retitled Aviator (Aviateur in French), rank titles would remain unchanged.

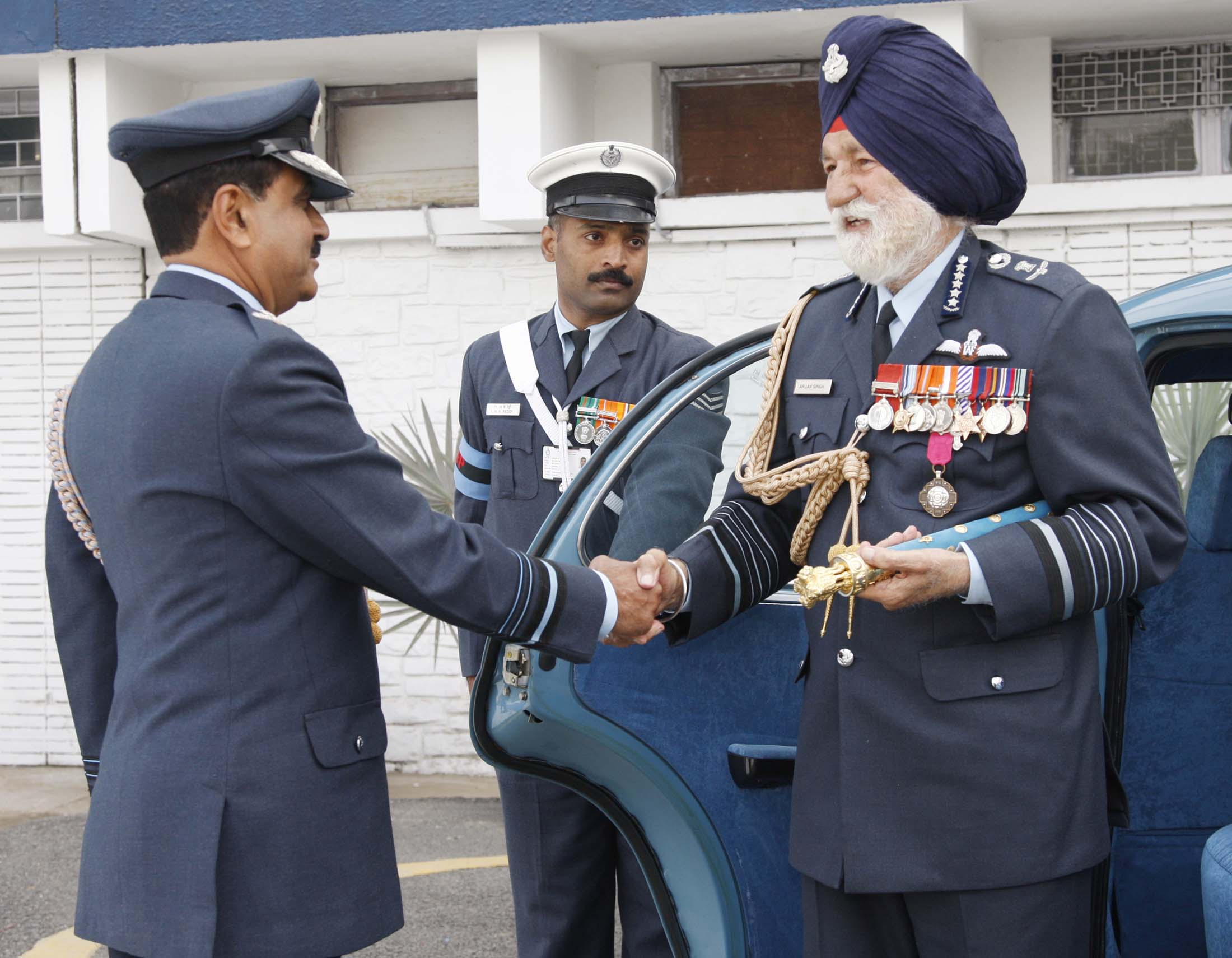
Marshal of the Indian Air Force Arjan Singh

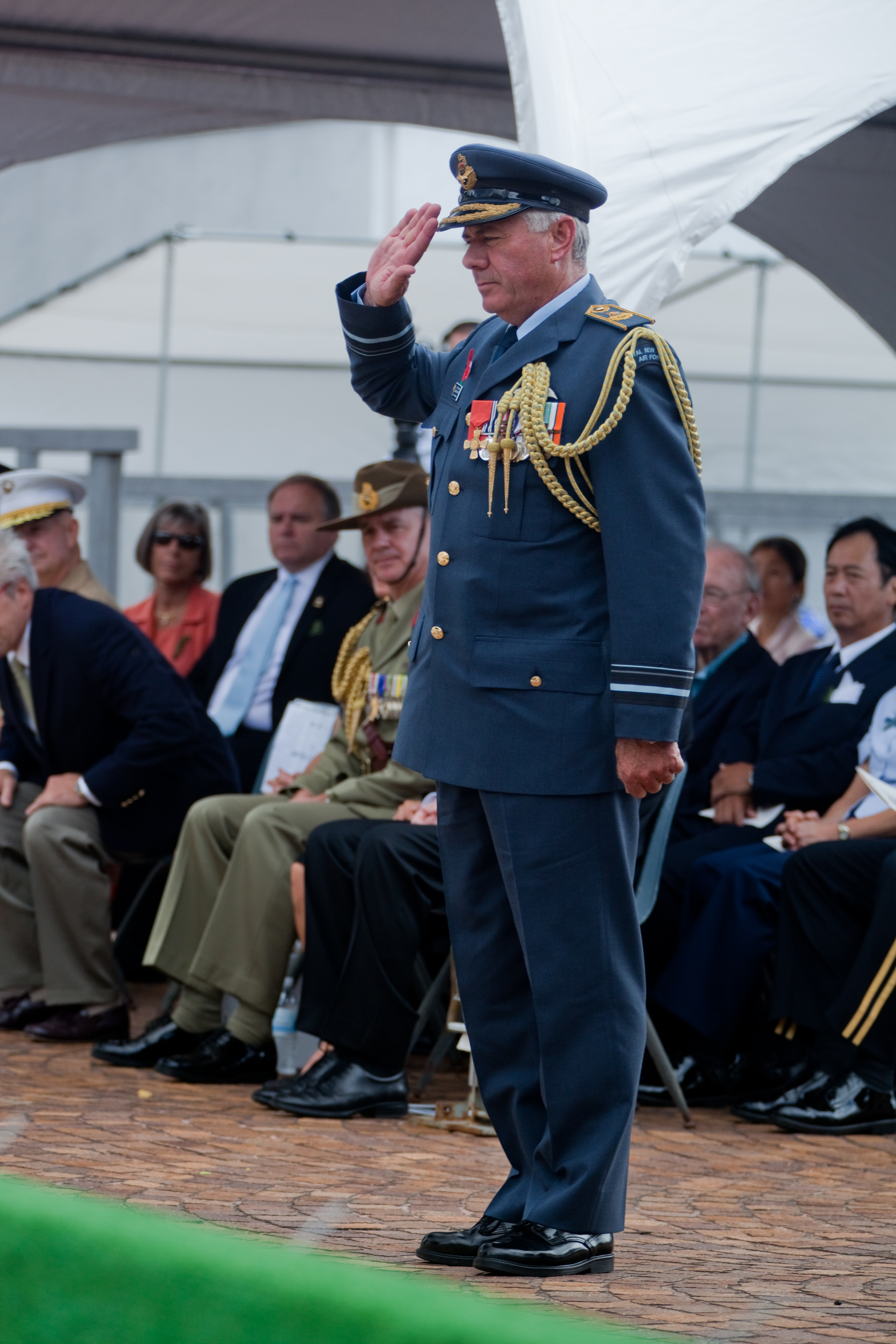
Air Vice Marshal of the RNZAF

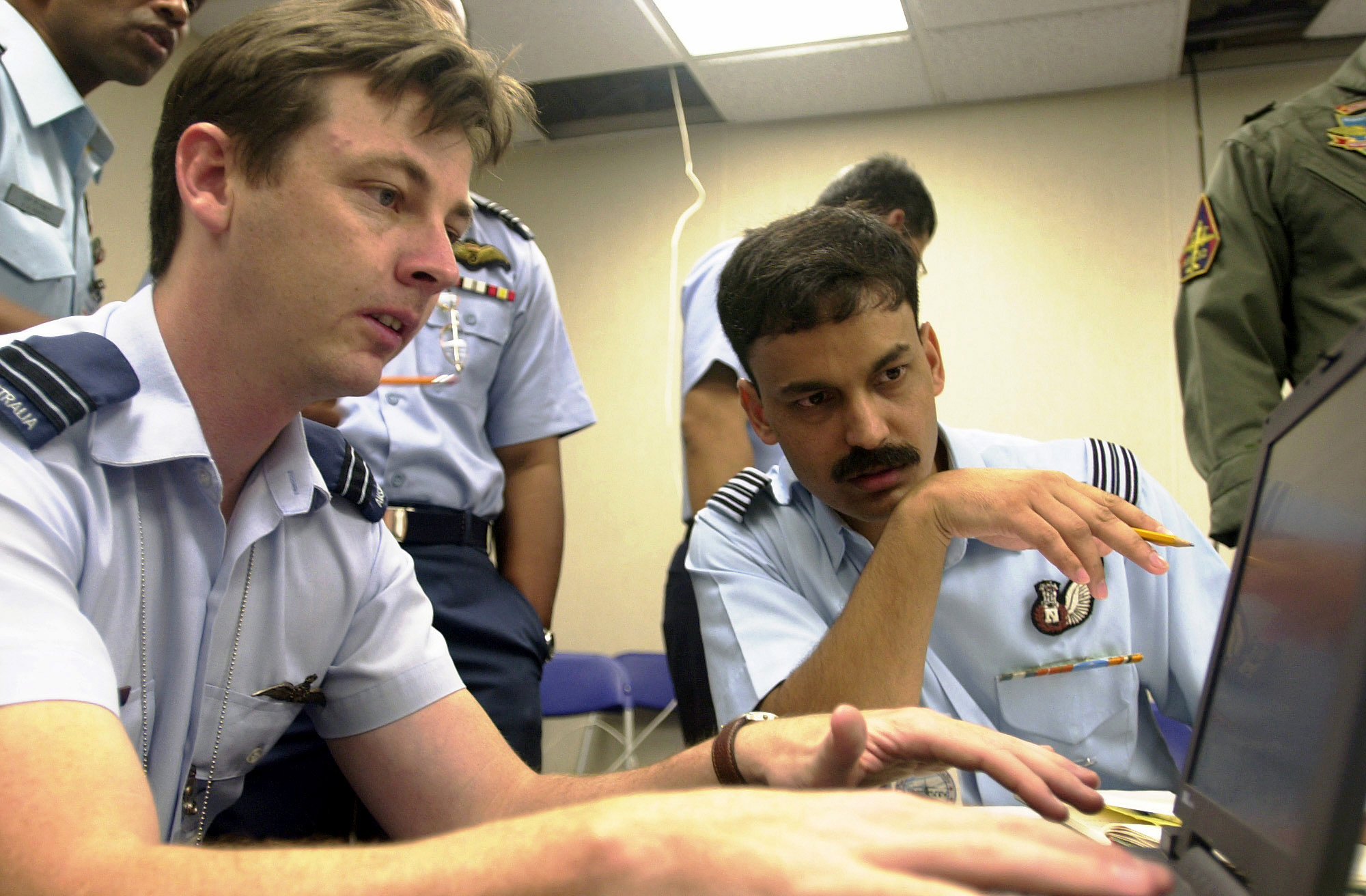
Officers of the Royal Australian Air Force and Indian Air Force

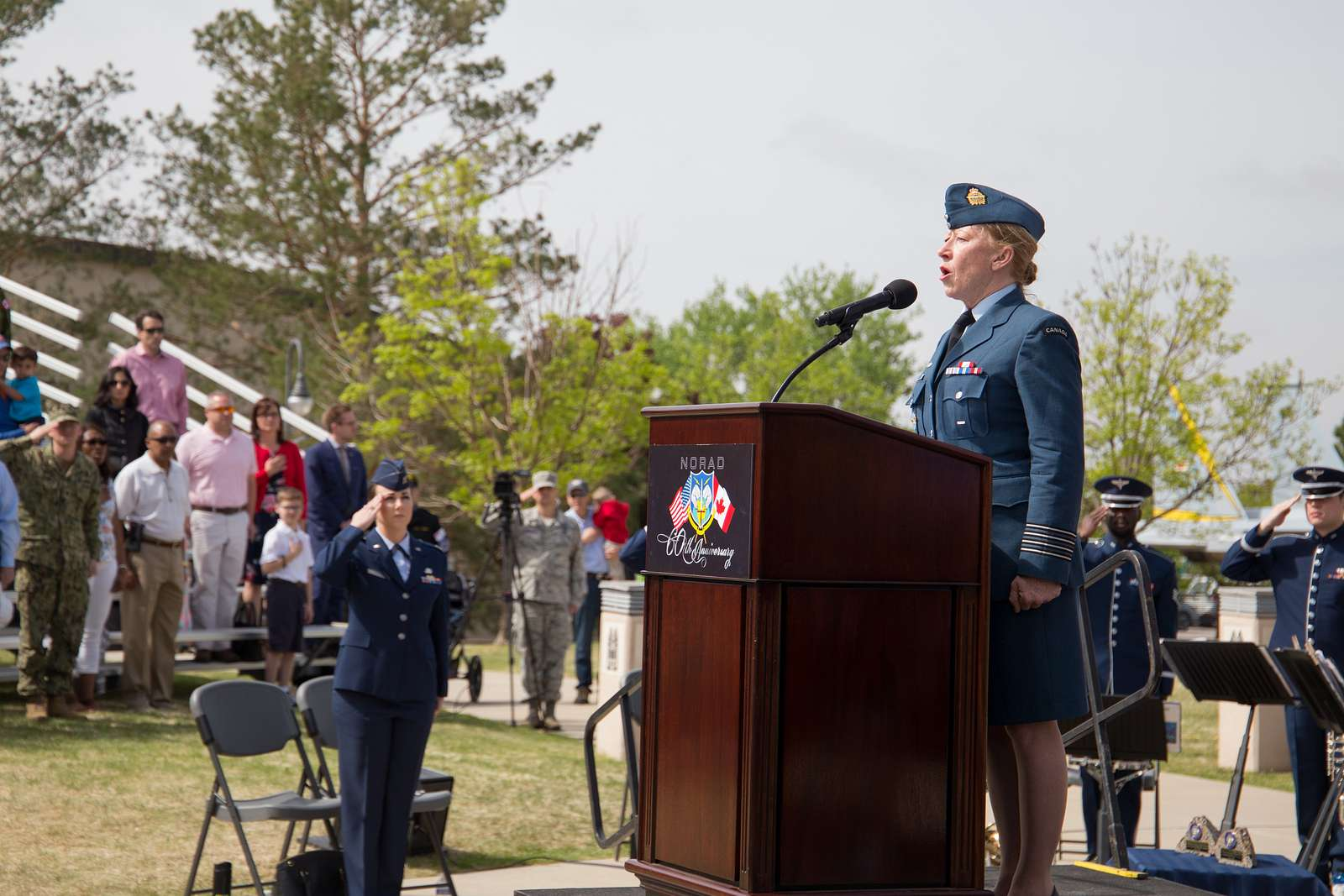
RCAF Colonel (at the podium)

=== Cadets ===
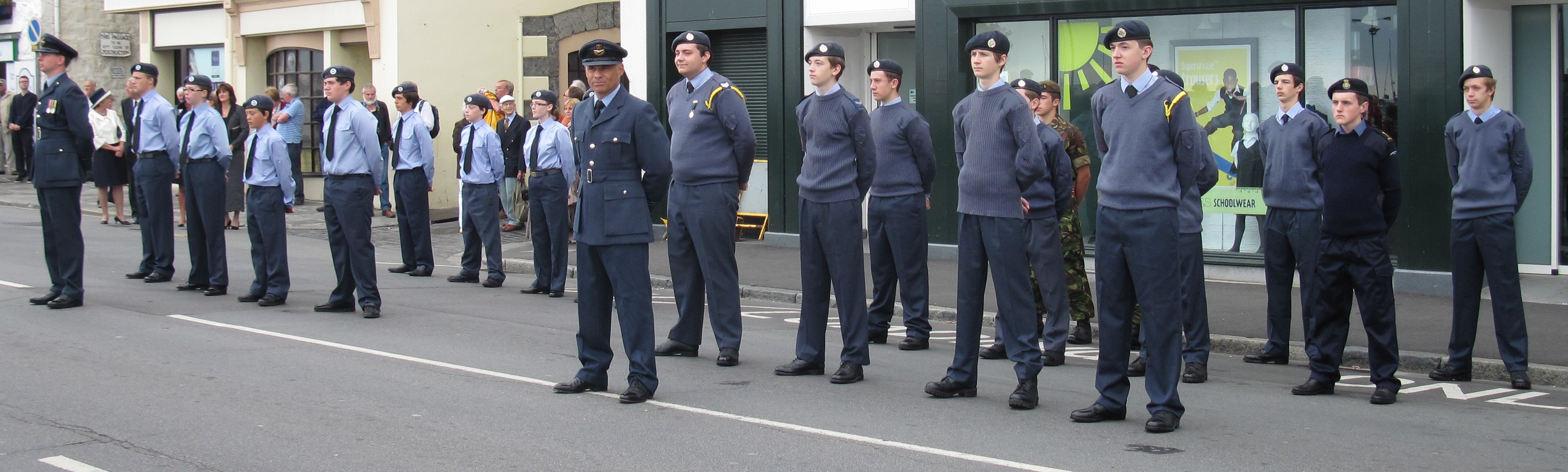
Air Cadets of the ATC (In shirt-sleeve order) and CCF (RAF Section).

Royal Air Force Air Cadets of the Air Training Corps (ATC) and Combined Cadet Force (RAF Section) wear the uniform of the Royal Air Force; ATC cadets being easily distinguished from Combined Cadet Force (CCF) cadets by their silvered metal ATC cap/beret badge, used in place of the standard RAF anodised (stay-bright) metal airman’s cap/beret badge. Cadets also wear a brassard on the right arm upon which the squadron (ATC) or school (CCF) identity badge, plus any merit badges, are displayed.

=== Royal Observer Corps ===
From 1941 until 1996, the Royal Observer Corps wore RAF uniforms, with a midnight blue beret, ROC cap badge, rank titles, insignia and tunic buttons. During the 1980s, ROC personnel were authorised to wear the RAF field service cap or WRAF pillbox style hat in place of the beret whilst in working dress. As with the ROC stable belt introduced during the same period, these additional uniform items were purchased privately at the expense of the individual.

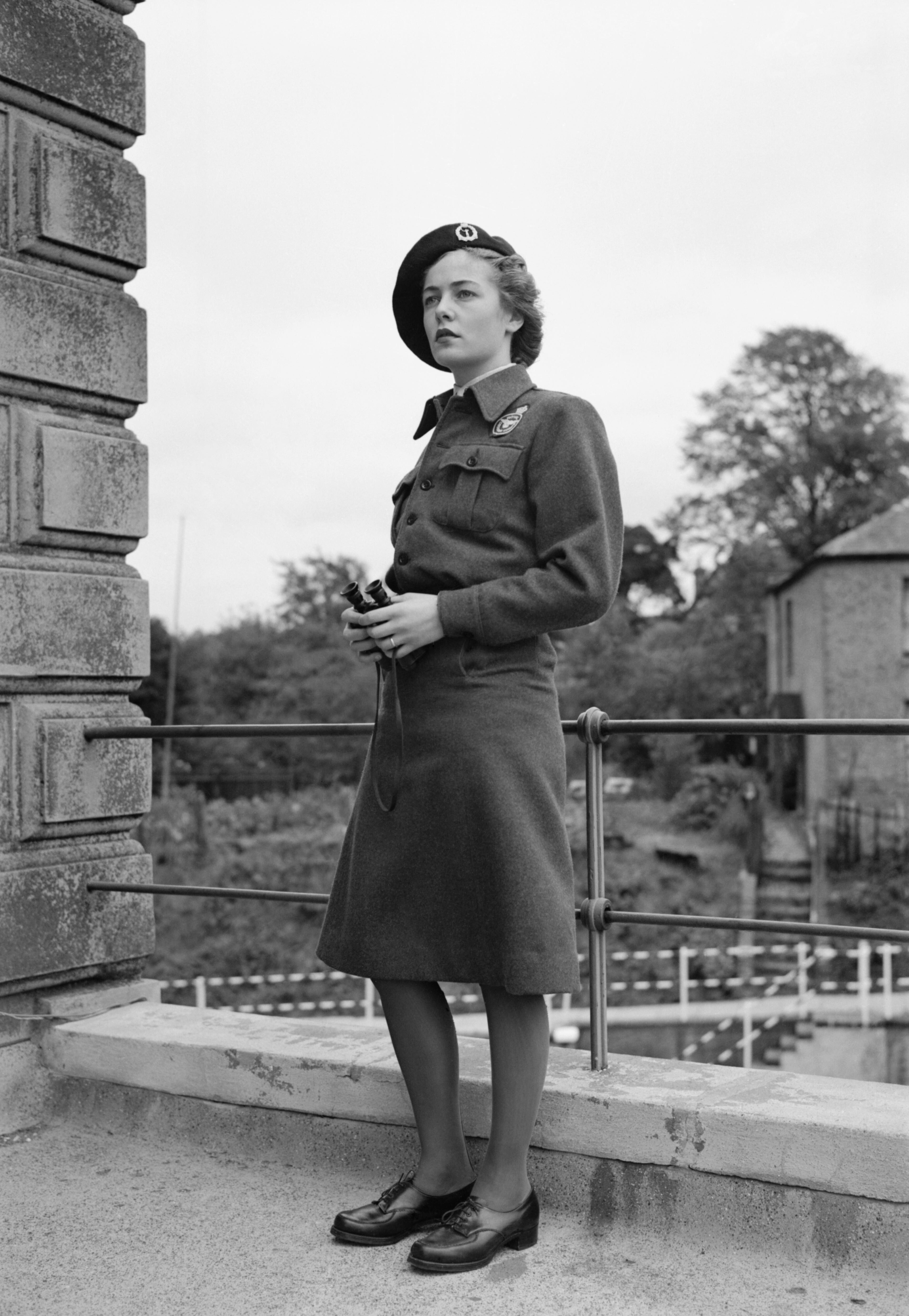
ROC personnel wearing RAF Battledress, 1941.

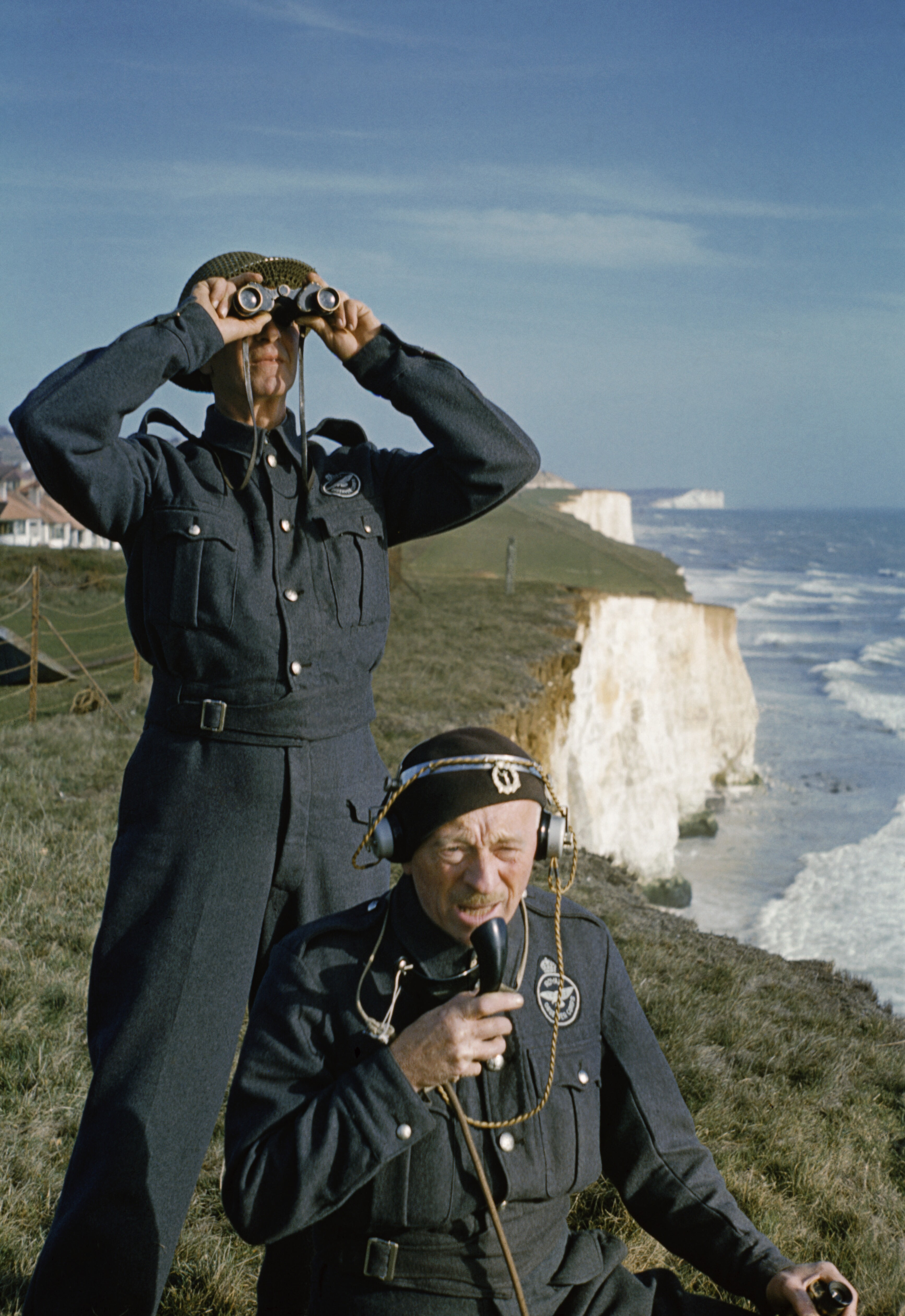
ROC personnel wearing RAF overalls, 1943.

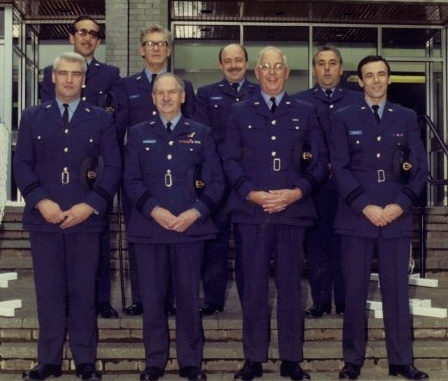
ROC officers wearing RAF No. 1 Service Dress, 1986.

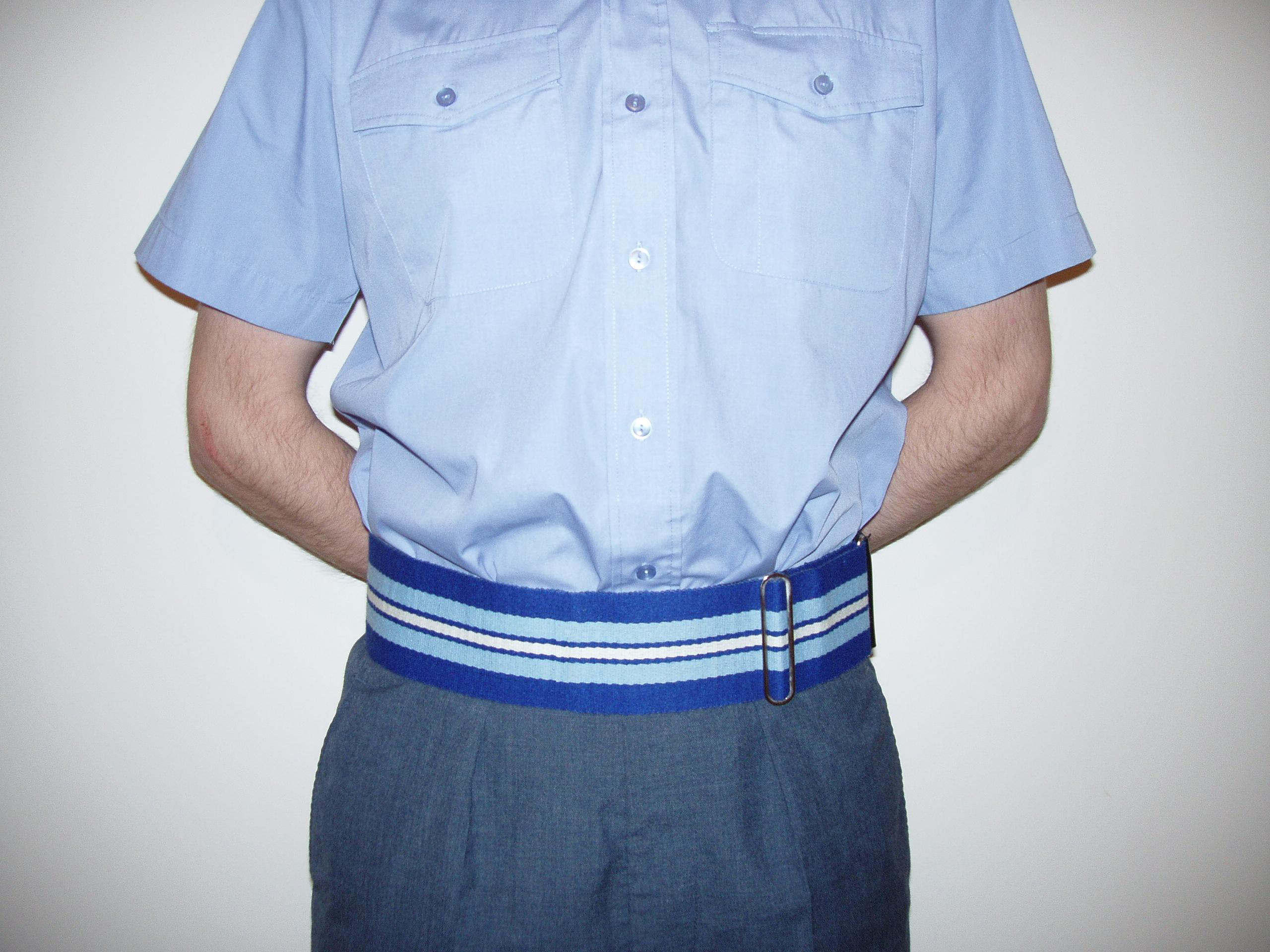
ROC personnel wearing RAF Service working dress No. 2b, with ROC stable belt, 1986.

Forage cap and pillbox hat worn as optional headwear in No. 2 Dress. (Forage cap with ROC Officer's gilt buttons/badge).

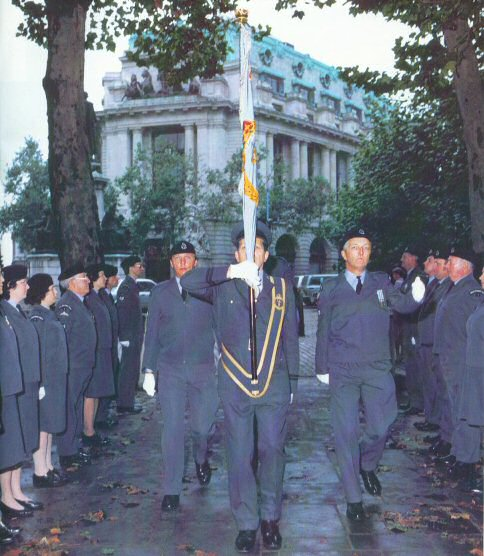
ROC personnel wearing RAF No. 1 SD and the RAF 1972 pattern BD blouse, 1991.

== See also ==
- Uniforms of the British Armed Forces
- Peaked cap#Royal Air Force
- Military uniform
