= Rollo Pain =

British Army officer (1921–2005)

Lieutenant-General Sir Rollo Pain KCB MC
- Born: 11 May 1921
- Died: 14 April 2005 (aged 83)
- Military career
- Allegiance: United Kingdom
- Branch: British Army
- Service years: 1943–1978
- Rank: Lieutenant-General
- Service number: 262292
- Unit: Royal Armoured Corps
- Commands: 2nd Division; 5th Infantry Brigade; 4th/7th Royal Dragoon Guards
- Conflicts: Second World War; Palestine Emergency; Indonesia–Malaysia confrontation
- Awards: Knight Commander of the Order of the Bath; Military Cross; Mentioned in Despatches

Lieutenant-General Sir Horace Rollo Squarey Pain, KCB, MC (11 May 1921 – 14 April 2005) was a British Army officer who commanded the 2nd Division from 1970 to 1972.

== Military career ==
Educated at Clifton College, Pain was commissioned into the Royal Armoured Corps in 1943 during the Second World War and served in North West Europe. He was awarded the Military Cross for his leadership during fighting for control of the village of Stemmen in Germany.

After the war Pain saw active service in Palestine during the Palestine Emergency, for which he was mentioned in despatches. In 1962 he became commanding officer of the 4th/7th Royal Dragoon Guards. He was appointed commander of the 5th Infantry Brigade in North Borneo in 1965, Assistant Chief of Staff, Operations at the Ministry of Defence in 1969 and General Officer Commanding (GOC) of the 2nd Division in 1970. He went on to be Director of Military Training in 1972 and Head of the British Defence Staff in Washington, D.C. in 1975 before retiring in 1978.

Pain was given the colonelcy of the 4th/7th Royal Dragoon Guards from 1979 to 1983.

== Family ==
In 1950 Pain married Denys Chaine-Nickson; they had a son and two daughters.

Military offices
| Preceded by Chandos Blair | GOC 2nd Division; 1970–1972 | Succeeded by John Archer |
| Preceded by Sir Ian Easton | Head of the British Defence Staff in Washington, D.C. 1975–1978 | Succeeded by Sir Roy Austen-Smith |
