= Tom Blackburn (Royal Navy officer) =

Royal Navy officer (born 1945)

Vice Admiral Sir Tom Blackburn KCVO CB
- Born: 18 January 1945 (age 81)
- Military career
- Allegiance: United Kingdom
- Branch: Royal Navy
- Rank: Vice Admiral
- Commands: 2nd Frigate Squadron; HMS Cornwall; HM Naval Base Clyde; HMS York; HMS Birmingham; HMS Kirkliston
- Awards: Knight Commander of the Royal Victorian Order; Companion of the Order of the Bath; Commander of the Order of St John

Vice Admiral Sir David Anthony James "Tom" Blackburn, KCVO, CB (born 18 January 1945) is a former British Royal Navy officer who served as Master of the Household between 2000 and 2005.

== Naval career ==
Blackburn was appointed to his first command, the minesweeper HMS Kirkliston, in 1972. He became equerry to the Duke of Edinburgh in 1976, executive officer of the cruiser HMS Antrim in 1978 and commander of the destroyer HMS Birmingham in 1983. He was promoted to captain on 31 December 1984, and went on to become commanding officer of the destroyer HMS York and captain D3 Squadron in 1987, commodore on Clyde and Naval Base Commander Clyde in 1990 and commanding officer of the frigate HMS Cornwall as well as captain of the 2nd Frigate Squadron in 1992.

After that Blackburn became head of the British Defence Staff and defence attaché in Washington, D.C. in 1994 and chief of Staff to the commander-in-chief Allied Naval Forces Southern Europe, Naples in 1997.

On leaving the Royal Navy Blackburn became Master of the Household, in which office he served from 2000 to 2005. He was a member of the Pensions Appeal Tribunal from 2005, chairman of the Marine Society, the Sea Cadets from 2006 and St John Ambulance London from 2006, as well as deputy chairman of the Royal Yachting Association from 2007.

Blackburn was appointed as a Lieutenant of the Royal Victorian Order in 1978, and promoted to Knight Commander of the same Order in 2004. He was also appointed as Companion of the Order of the Bath in 1999.

Military offices
Preceded by Peter Dodworth	Head of the British Defence Staff in Washington, D.C. 1994–1997	Succeeded by Charles Vyvyan
Court offices
Preceded by Sir Simon Cooper	Master of the Household; 2000–2005	Succeeded by Sir David Walker
