= Anthony Boam =

British Army general (1932–2023)

Major-General Anthony Boam CB CBE
- Born: 14 February 1932
- Died: 20 November 2023 (aged 91)
- Military career
- Allegiance: United Kingdom
- Branch: British Army
- Service years: 1952–1987
- Rank: Major-General
- Commands: British Forces in Hong Kong; British Army Advisory Team in Nigeria; 2nd Battalion Scots Guards
- Conflicts: The Troubles
- Awards: Companion of the Order of the Bath; Commander of the Order of the British Empire

Major-General Thomas Anthony Boam, CB, CBE (14 February 1932 – 20 November 2023) was a British Army officer who was Commander of British Forces in Hong Kong from 1985 to 1987.

== Biography ==
Educated at Bradfield College and the Royal Military Academy Sandhurst, Boam was commissioned into the Scots Guards in 1952. He became commanding officer of the 2nd Battalion Scots Guards and was deployed to Northern Ireland, where he was appointed an Officer of the Order of the British Empire for his services there in 1973. He became commander of the British Army Advisory Team in Nigeria in 1976, Brigadier General Staff at Headquarters UK Land Forces in 1978 and chief of staff for British Forces in Hong Kong in 1979. He was appointed Head of the British Defence Staff in Washington, D.C. in 1981, and Commander of British Forces in Hong Kong in 1985. In that capacity he hosted a visit by Princess Margaret. He retired in 1987, and died on 20 November 2023, at the age of 91.

Military offices
Preceded by Sir Roy Austen-Smith	Head of the British Defence Staff in Washington, D.C. 1981–1984	Succeeded by Ronald Dick
Preceded by Sir Derek Boorman	Commander of British Forces in Hong Kong; 1985–1987	Succeeded by Sir Garry Johnson
