= Edwin Beckett =

British Army general

Major-General Edwin Beckett CB MBE
- Born: 16 May 1937
- Died: 15 November 2018 (aged 81)
- Military career
- Allegiance: United Kingdom
- Branch: British Army
- Service years: 1957–1991
- Rank: Major-General
- Unit: West Yorkshire Regiment
- Commands: 1st Infantry Brigade (1982–84); 1st Battalion Prince of Wales's Own Regiment of Yorkshire (1976–79)
- Conflicts: Aden Emergency
- Awards: Companion of the Order of the Bath; Member of the Order of the British Empire

Major-General Edwin Horace Alexander Beckett, CB, MBE (16 May 1937 – 15 November 2018) was a British Army officer who became Head of the British Defence Staff in Washington, D.C.

== Military career ==
Educated at the Henry Fanshawe School and the Royal Military Academy Sandhurst, Beckett was commissioned into the West Yorkshire Regiment in 1957. As a junior officer he saw active service during the Aden Emergency. He became commanding officer of 1st Battalion Prince of Wales's Own Regiment of Yorkshire in 1976, a member of the directing staff at the Staff College, Camberley, in 1979 and commander of the 1st Infantry Brigade in 1982. He went on to be chief of staff at Headquarters British Army of the Rhine in 1985 and Head of the British Defence Staff and Defence Attaché in Washington, D.C. in 1988 before retiring in 1991.

After retiring from the army, Beckett was Chairman of the British Brands Group. He died on 15 November 2018, at the age of 81.

Military offices
Preceded by Ronald Dick	Head of the British Defence Staff in Washington, D.C. 1988–1991	Succeeded by Peter Dodworth
