= Ronald Dick =

Royal Air Force officer (1931–2008)

- Born: 18 October 1931; Newcastle upon Tyne, England
- Died: 25 March 2008 (aged 76); Fredericksburg, United States
- Military career
- Allegiance: United Kingdom
- Branch: Royal Air Force
- Service years: 1950–1988
- Rank: Air Vice-Marshal
- Commands: RAF Honington (1978–80); No. 9 Squadron (1970–72)
- Conflicts: Falklands War
- Awards: Companion of the Order of the Bath; Queen's Commendation for Valuable Service in the Air

Air Vice-Marshal Ronald Dick, CB, FRAeS (18 October 1931 – 25 March 2008) was a Royal Air Force officer who served as head of the British Defence Staff in Washington, D.C. from 1984 to 1988.

== RAF career ==
Educated at Beckenham and Penge County Grammar School, Dick joined the Royal Air Force as a cadet in January 1950. He became officer commanding No. 9 Squadron RAF flying Vulcan bombers in 1970. He went on to be Junior Air Force Member on the staff of the Royal College of Defence Studies in 1972, Personal Staff Officer to the Deputy Supreme Allied Commander Europe in 1974 and station commander at RAF Honington in 1978. After that he became Air Attaché in Washington, D.C. in 1980 in which role he negotiated US support for British air operations during Falklands War in 1982. His last appointments were as Director of Organisation and Establishments in 1983, as Director of Quartering in 1984 and as Head of the British Defence Staff and Defence Attaché in Washington, D.C., in 1984 before retiring in 1988.

Military offices
| Preceded by Anthony Boam | Head of the British Defence Staff in Washington, D.C. 1984–1988 | Succeeded by Edwin Beckett |
