= British Defence Staff – US =

The British Defence Staff – US, which was previously known as British Joint Staff Mission and British Defence Staff (Washington), is the home of the Ministry of Defence in the United States of America and its purpose is to serve the interests of His Majesty's Government in the US.

The British Defence Staff – US is led by the Defence Attaché who is the British Ambassador's senior adviser on defence issues, and has responsibility over 750 military and civilian Ministry of Defence personnel located both within the Embassy and in 30 states across the US.

== Recent defence attachés ==
Attachés have included:

- 1941–1944 Field Marshal Sir John Dill
- 1945–1947 Field Marshal Henry Maitland Wilson, 1st Baron Wilson
- 1948–1950 Air Chief Marshal Sir Charles Medhurst
- 1950–1951 Marshal of the Royal Air Force Arthur Tedder, 1st Baron Tedder
- 1951–1953 Air Chief Marshal Sir William Elliot
- 1953–1956 General Sir John Whiteley
- 1956–1959 Admiral Sir Michael Denny
- 1959–1962 Air Chief Marshal Sir George Mills
- 1962–1965 General Sir Michael Alston-Roberts-West
- 1965–1967 Admiral Sir Nigel Henderson
- 1967–1970 Lieutenant-General Sir George Lea
- 1970–1973 Air Marshal Sir John Lapsley
- 1973–1975 Vice-Admiral Sir Ian Easton
- 1975–1978 Lieutenant-General Sir Rollo Pain
- 1978–1981 Air Marshal Sir Roy Austen-Smith
- 1981–1984 Major-General Anthony Boam
- 1984–1988 Air Vice-Marshal Ronald Dick
- 1988–1991 Major-General Edwin Beckett
- 1991–1994 Air Vice-Marshal Peter Dodworth
- 1994–1997 Rear-Admiral Anthony Blackburn
- 1997–2000 Major-General Charles Vyvyan
- 2000–2002 Air Vice-Marshal John Thompson
- 2002–2005 Rear-Admiral Anthony Dymock
- 2006–2008 Major General Peter Gilchrist
- 2008–2011 Air Vice Marshal Michael Harwood
- 2011–2015 Major-General Buster Howes
- 2015–2017 Major-General Richard Cripwell
- 2017–2020 Air Vice-Marshal Gavin Parker
- 2020–2023 Air Vice-Marshal Michael Smeath
- 2023–2026 Rear-Admiral Tim Woods
- 2026–present Air Vice-Marshal Chris Mullen
