= Roy Austen-Smith =

British air marshal (1924–2021)

Air Marshal Sir Roy Austen-Smith KBE CB CVO DFC
- Born: 28 June 1924
- Died: 27 March 2021 (aged 96)
- Military career
- Allegiance: United Kingdom
- Branch: Royal Air Force
- Service years: 1943–1981
- Rank: Air Marshal
- Commands: British Forces Cyprus; Royal Air Force College Cranwell; RAF Wattisham; No. 57 Squadron; No. 73 Squadron
- Conflicts: Second World War; Malayan Emergency
- Awards: Knight Commander of the Order of the British Empire; Companion of the Order of the Bath; Commander of the Royal Victorian Order; Distinguished Flying Cross

Air Marshal Sir Roy David Austen-Smith, KBE, CB, CVO, DFC (28 June 1924 – 27 March 2021) was a Royal Air Force air marshal who served as Commander of British Forces Cyprus.

== RAF career ==
Educated at Hurstpierpoint College, Austen-Smith joined the Royal Air Force Volunteer Reserve in 1943 during the Second World War. He received an emergency commission as a pilot officer (on probation) on 7 April 1944, and was confirmed in his rank and promoted to flying officer (war-substantive) on 8 October. Austen-Smith was posted to his first operational unit, No. 41 Squadron, on 27 March 1945, and fought front line actions with 125 Wing through the Netherlands and Germany until the cessation of hostilities in May 1945. He remained with the unit until 31 March 1946, and was promoted to flight lieutenant (war-substantive) on 7 April 1946, subsequently receiving an extended-service commission in the rank of flying officer on 15 August. He was promoted to the substantive rank of flight lieutenant on 7 October 1947, and was granted a permanent commission in the RAF on 15 January 1948, in the same rank.

Austen-Smith served as a Flight Commander with No. 33 Squadron in Malaya from 1950 to 1953, when he was posted to the RAF College at Cranwell. He was promoted to squadron leader on 1 October 1954 and became Officer Commanding No. 73 Squadron in 1956. He was promoted to wing commander on 1 July 1960, and became Officer Commanding No. 57 Squadron in 1964. Promoted to group captain on 1 January 1966, he went on to be Station Commander at RAF Wattisham in 1968.

Austen-Smith was promoted to air commodore on 1 January 1970. He was posted for special duty with the Air Staff on 14 February 1972, with the acting rank of air vice-marshal. He was appointed the Commandant of the Royal Air Force College Cranwell in September 1972 and was promoted to the substantive rank of air vice-marshal on 1 January 1973. He was appointed Senior Air Staff Officer at Headquarters Near East Air Force in November 1975. After that he became Commander, British Forces Cyprus/Air Commander, Cyprus and, Administrator, British Sovereign Base Areas - Cyprus on 1 April 1976; and Head of the British Defence Staff in Washington, D.C., in 1978. He was promoted to air marshal on 1 July 1979, and retired on 1 November 1981 after a 38-year career.

In retirement Austen-Smith served as a Gentleman Usher to the Queen.

He died on 27 March 2021 at the age of 96.

== Honours ==
Austen-Smith was awarded the Distinguished Flying Cross (DFC) in March 1953, for service during the Malayan Emergency. He was appointed a Companion of the Order of the Bath, Military Division (CB) in the 1975 Birthday Honours. He was knighted as a Knight Commander of the Order of the British Empire, Military Division (KBE) in the 1979 Birthday Honours, and as a Gentleman Usher to the Queen, appointed a Commander of the Royal Victorian Order (CVO) in the 1994 New Year Honours.

Military offices
Preceded by John Aiken	Commander, British Forces Near East/Air Officer Commanding, Air Headquarters Cyprus; 1976–1978	Succeeded by Reynell Taylor
Preceded by Sir Rollo Pain	Head of the British Defence Staff in Washington, D.C. 1978–1981	Succeeded by Anthony Boam
