= Peter Dodworth =

- Born: 12 September 1940 (age 86)
- Military career
- Allegiance: United Kingdom
- Branch: Royal Air Force
- Service years: 1963–1996
- Rank: Air Marshal
- Commands: RAF Wittering
- Awards: Companion of the Order of the Bath; Officer of the Order of the British Empire; Air Force Cross

Air Vice Marshal Peter Dodworth, CB, OBE, AFC (born 12 September 1940) is a former Royal Air Force officer who served as head of the British Defence Staff in Washington, D.C. from 1991 to 1994.

== RAF career ==
Educated at King George V Grammar School and the University of Leeds, Dodworth joined the Royal Air Force (RAF) in 1963. As a junior officer he was one of the first pilots to be trained on the Harrier. He became officer commanding operations at RAF Wittering in 1976, Air Commander in Belize in 1980 and a member of the directing staff at the RAF Staff College, Bracknell, in 1982. He went on to be Station Commander at RAF Wittering in 1983, a staff officer at Headquarters Allied Air Forces Central Europe in 1985 and Director of Personnel at the Ministry of Defence in 1988. His last appointments were as Head of the British Defence Staff and Defence Attaché in Washington, D.C. in 1991 and as Senior Member of the Directing Staff (Air) at the Royal College of Defence Studies in 1994 before retiring in 1996.

Military offices
Preceded by Edwin Beckett	Head of the British Defence Staff in Washington, D.C. 1991–1994	Succeeded by Anthony Blackburn
