= Ian Easton (Royal Navy officer) =

Royal Navy Admiral (1917–1989)

Admiral Sir Ian Easton KCB DSC
- Born: 27 November 1917; Tenby, Pembrokeshire, Wales
- Died: 14 June 1989 (aged 71); Freshwater, Isle of Wight, Hampshire, England
- Military career
- Allegiance: United Kingdom
- Branch: Royal Navy
- Service years: 1931–1978
- Rank: Admiral
- Commands: Royal College of Defence Studies (1976–78); HMS Triumph (1968–69); HMAS Watson (1962–64)
- Conflicts: Second World War
- Awards: Knight Commander of the Order of the Bath; Distinguished Service Cross

Admiral Sir Ian Easton, KCB, DSC (27 November 1917 – 14 June 1989) was a Royal Navy officer who held various command positions in the 1970s.

== Naval career ==
Easton joined the Royal Navy in 1931 and qualified as a pilot at the start of the Second World War, during which he saw active service on aircraft carriers. On 4 January 1941, flying a Fairey Fulmar of 803 Naval Air Squadron from HMS Formidable during a raid on Dakar, he force landed with his aircrewman Naval Airman James Burkey and was taken prisoner and held by the Vichy French at a camp near Timbuktu, until released in November 1942.

Easton was appointed Assistant Director of the Tactical and Weapons Policy Division at the Admiralty in 1960. He was seconded to the Royal Australian Navy as captain of HMAS Watson in 1962. He went on to be Naval Assistant to the Naval Member of the Templer Committee on Rationalisation of Air Power in 1965, Director of Naval Tactical and Weapons Policy Division at the Admiralty in 1966 and Captain of the aircraft carrier HMS Triumph in 1968. After that he was made Assistant Chief of Naval Staff (Policy) in 1969, Flag Officer for the Admiralty Interview Board in 1971 and Head of British Defence Staff and Senior Defence Attaché in Washington, D.C. in 1973. He last posting was as Commandant of the Royal College of Defence Studies in 1976: he commissioned armourial bearings for the college which were presented during a visit by the Queen in November 1977. He retired in March 1978.

Military offices
Preceded by Sir John Lapsley	Head of the British Defence Staff in Washington, D.C. 1973–1975	Succeeded by Sir Rollo Pain
Preceded by Sir John Barraclough	Commandant of the Royal College of Defence Studies; 1976–1978	Succeeded by Sir David Fraser
