= Derek Boorman =

British Army general (1930–2025)

Lieutenant-General Sir Derek Boorman KCB
- Born: 13 September 1930
- Died: 25 April 2025 (aged 94)
- Military career
- Allegiance: United Kingdom
- Branch: British Army
- Service years: 1950−1988
- Rank: Lieutenant-General
- Service number: 411897
- Unit: North Staffordshire Regiment
- Commands: 51st Brigade; Commander of British Forces in Hong Kong
- Awards: Knight Commander of the Order of the Bath

Lieutenant-General Sir Derek Boorman KCB (13 September 1930 – 25 April 2025) was a British Army officer.

== Military career ==
Educated at Wolstanton Grammar School and the Royal Military Academy Sandhurst, Boorman was commissioned into the North Staffordshire Regiment in 1950. He was deputy assistant adjutant and quartermaster general at Headquarters 48th Gurkha Infantry Brigade and subsequently commander of 51st Brigade in Hong Kong.

He was appointed director of military operations at the Ministry of Defence in 1980 and Commander of British Forces in Hong Kong in 1982. He went on to be Chief of Defence Intelligence in 1985: in that capacity he took the view that Mikhail Gorbachev's proposals for internal reform and deep cuts in missile stocks were genuine. He retired from the British Army in 1988.

He was also colonel of the 6th Queen Elizabeth's Own Gurkha Rifles from 1983 to 1988 and Colonel of the Staffordshire Regiment from 1985 to 1990.

Boorman was appointed Lieutenant of the Tower of London in 1989, holding office until 1992.

Boorman was appointed a Companion of the Order of the Bath (CB) in the 1982 Birthday Honours, and promoted to Knight Commander of the Order (KCB) in the 1986 New Year Honours.

== Retirement and death ==
In October 1992 he was appointed a Member of the Government's Security Commission and in 1996 he accused Government Ministers of being untruthful in their evidence to the Arms to Iraq Inquiry. He retired from the Security Commission in 1998.

In 1994 he became Chairman of the Royal Hospitals Trust – a post he held until 1998. Then in 2000 he became a Deputy Pro-Chancellor of the University of Kent.

Boorman died on 25 April 2025, at the age of 94.

Military offices
Preceded by Sir John Chapple	Commander of British Forces in Hong Kong; 1982–1985	Succeeded by Anthony Boam
Preceded by Sir Michael Armitage	Chief of Defence Intelligence; 1986–1988	Succeeded by Sir John Kerr
