= Michael Harwood (RAF officer) =

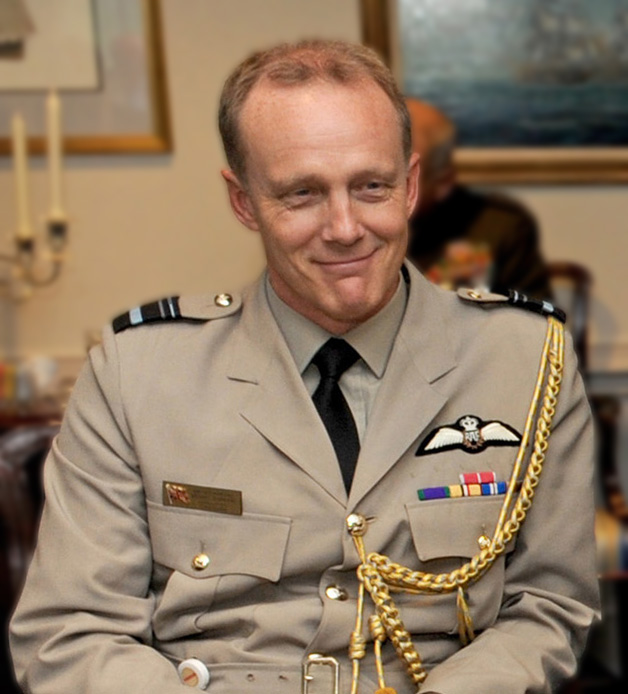
- Michael Harwood in May 2011
- Born: 29 October 1958 (age 67)
- Military career
- Allegiance: United Kingdom
- Branch: Royal Air Force
- Service years: 1978–2012
- Rank: Air Vice-Marshal
- Commands: British Defence Staff – US (2008–11); No. 83 Expeditionary Air Group (2007–08); RAF Cottesmore (2001–03); No. 20 Squadron (1998–2000)
- Conflicts: Iraq War
- Awards: Companion of the Order of the Bath; Commander of the Order of the British Empire; Queen's Commendation for Valuable Service in the Air

Air Vice Marshal Michael John Harwood, CB, CBE (born 29 October 1958) is a retired senior Royal Air Force officer who served as Defence Attaché and Head of the British Defence Staff – US in Washington, D.C. from 2008 to 2011.

== RAF career ==
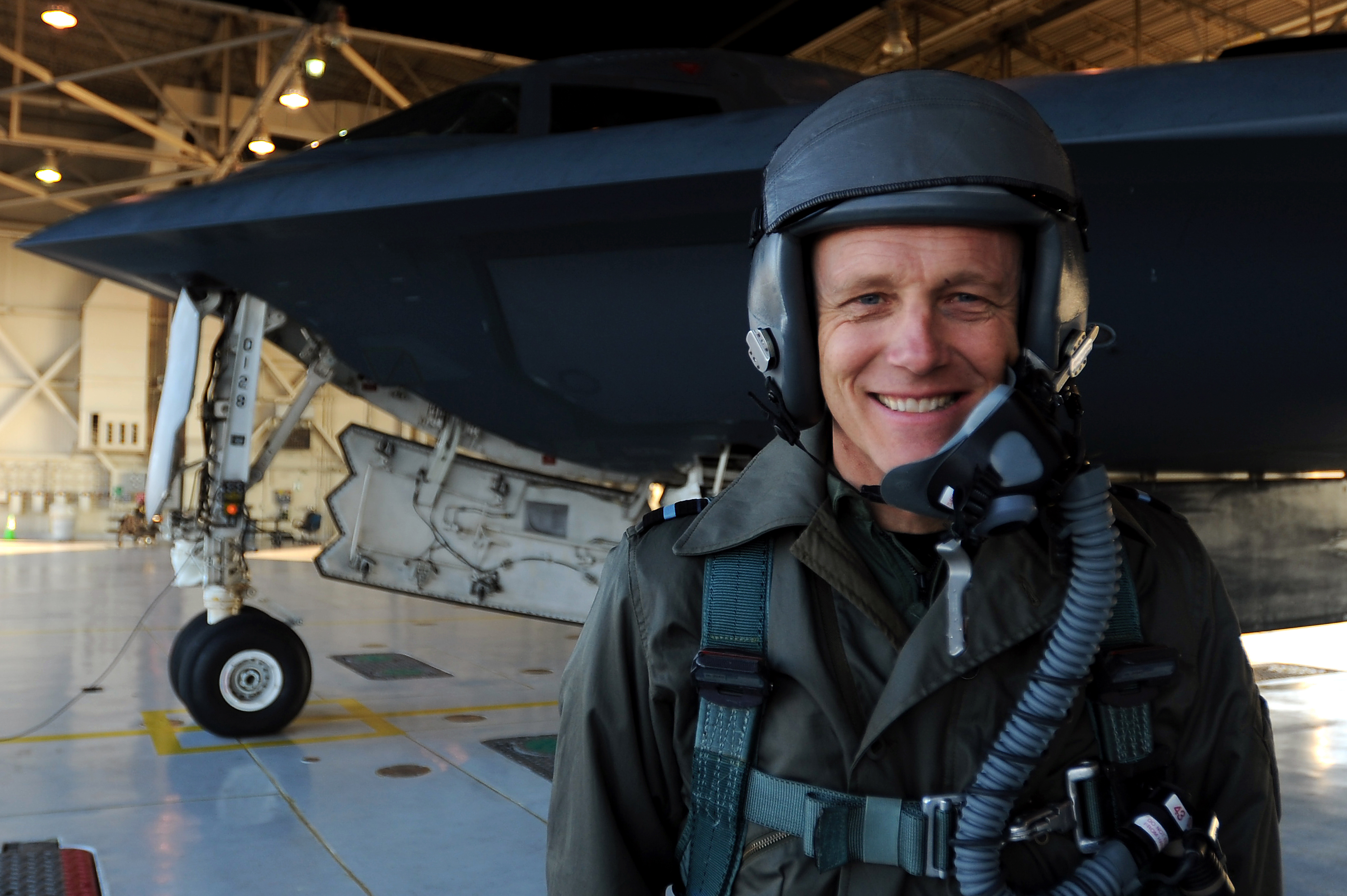
Michael Harwood visiting the Whiteman Air Force Base, Missouri, United States.

Educated at Merchant Taylors' School and at King's College London (MA Defence Studies), Harwood joined the RAF as a fast-jet pilot in 1978, initially serving as a flying instructor on Hawk and Harrier GR3/T4 aircraft. He received the Queen's Commendation for Valuable Service in the Air in December 1990. Promoted to wing commander, he became Commanding Officer of No. 20 Squadron (Harrier Operational Conversion Unit) at RAF Wittering in 1998 and, following promotion to group captain, he became Commander British Forces (Gulf) in Saudi Arabia in 2000. He went on to be Station Commander, RAF Cottesmore in 2001 before being deployed as Operating Base Commander, Kuwait for Operation Telic in 2003. He joined the Public Relations Directorate at the Ministry of Defence in 2004, became Assistant Commandant (Air) at the Joint Services Command and Staff College in 2005 and was the appointed Chief of the ISAF Detachment, CENTAF Combined Air Operations Centre at Al Udeid with the rank of air commodore in September 2007.

Harwood became Air Officer Commanding No. 83 Expeditionary Air Group, Al Udeid in 2007. He was promoted air vice marshal and appointed Head of the British Defence Staff – US and Defence Attaché in November 2008. He was appointed Companion of the Order of the Bath in the 2012 New Year Honours.

Military offices
Preceded by David Walker	Station Commander RAF Cottesmore; 2001–2003	Succeeded by Andrew Golledge
Preceded by Paul Oborn	Air Officer Commanding No. 83 Expeditionary Air Group; 2007–2008	Succeeded by Tony Barmby
Preceded by Peter Gilchrist	Head of the British Defence Staff – US and Defence Attaché; 2008–2011	Succeeded by Buster Howes
