= 1975 Birthday Honours =

UK national government awards list for the Commonwealth

The Queen's Birthday Honours 1975 were appointments in many of the Commonwealth realms of Queen Elizabeth II to various orders and honours to reward and highlight good works by citizens of those countries. They were published on 6 June 1975 for the United Kingdom, Australia (for Papua New Guinea), New Zealand, Mauritius, Fiji, the Bahamas, and Grenada. These were the last Birthday Honours on the advice of Australian Ministers for Papua New Guinea, as the nation gained independence from Australia on 16 September 1975.

The recipients of honours are displayed here as they were styled before their new honour, and arranged by honour, with classes (Knight, Knight Grand Cross, etc.) and then divisions (Military, Civil, etc.) as appropriate.

At this time honours for Australians were still being awarded in the UK honours on the advice of the premiers of Australian states. The Australian honours system began with the 1975 Queen's Birthday Honours (Australia), but these first awards were only for the Order of Australia.

== United Kingdom ==
=== Life peers ===
- Sir William Denholm Barnetson, Chairman, United Newspapers Ltd.
- John Gregson, Managing Director, Fairey Engineering Ltd, Stockport.
- Sydney Jacobson, M.C., lately Editorial Director and Deputy Chairman, International Publishing Corporation Newspapers.
- Sir Leslie Maurice Lever, Member of Parliament for the Ardwick Division of Manchester 1950–70.
- Sir Sydney Thomas Franklin (Don) Ryder, Industrial Adviser to H.M. Government.
- John Farquharson Smith, lately Lord Provost of Aberdeen.

=== Privy Counsellor ===
- The Right Honourable Patricia, Baroness Llewelyn-Davies of Hastoe, Captain of Her Majesty's Body Guard of the Honourable Corps of Gentlemen at Arms.
- Bruce Millan, M.P., Minister of State, Scottish Office. Member of Parliament for the Craigton Division of Glasgow.
- William Thomas Rodgers, M.P., Minister of State, Ministry of Defence. Member of Parliament for the Stockton Division of Teesside.

=== Knight Bachelor ===
- Brigadier John Anstey, C.B.E., T.D., D.L., President and Chairman, National Savings Committee.
- Colonel Richard Dawnay Martin-Bird, C.B.E., T.D., D.L., Vice-Chairman of the Council of Territorial Auxiliary and Volunteer Reserve Associations.
- George Sidney Bishop, C.B., O.B.E, Chairman, Booker McConnell, Ltd.
- Ernest Ashley Bramall, Leader, Inner London Education Authority.
- Gordon Frank Claringbull, Director, British Museum (Natural History).
- John Halliday Croom, T.D., Chairman, Scottish Council for Postgraduate Medical Education.
- Professor Samuel Frederick Edwards, F.R.S., Chairman, Science Research Council.
- Robert Duncan Fairbairn. For services to development in Scotland.
- James Bernard Flanagan, C.B.E., Chief Constable, Royal Ulster Constabulary.
- Peter Bernhard Hirsch, F.R.S., Isaac Wolfson Professor of Metallurgy, University of Oxford.
- Henry Charles Husband, C.B.E., Senior Partner, Husband and Company, Consulting Engineers.
- Sydney Percy King, O.B.E., Chairman, Trent Regional Health Authority.
- Arthur William Knight, Deputy Chairman, Courtaulds Ltd.
- Osbert Lancaster, C.B.E., Artist, Writer and Cartoonist.
- Professor Edmund Ronald Leach, F.B.A., Provost of King's College, University of Cambridge.
- Colonel William Allison Lee, O.B.E., T.D., Chairman, Northern Regional Health Authority.
- Anthony Baruh Lousada. For services to the Arts.
- John Henry Loveridge, C.B.E., Bailiff of Guernsey.
- Peter Alec Matthews, Managing Director, Vickers Ltd. For services to Export.
- David Lancaster Nicolson, Chairman, British Airways Board.
- Alfred Brian Pippard, F.R.S., Cavendish Professor of Physics, University of Cambridge.
- Victor Sawdon Pritchett, C.B.E., Author and Critic.
- Edward Henry Sibbald Singleton, President, The Law Society.
- Rodney Geoffrey Swiss, O.B.E., President, General Dental Council.
- Daniel Thomson, C.B., Civil Service Medical Adviser.
- Charles Hyde Villiers, M.C., Chairman, Guinness Mahon and Company Ltd. For services to Industry.
- Ronald Wallace Wates. For charitable and philanthropic services.
- Jack Alfred Wellings, C.B.E., Chairman and Managing Director, The George Cohen 600 Group Ltd. For services to Export.
- Stanley Graham Yapp, Leader, West Midlands County Council.
- William Young, C.B.E. For services to agriculture in Scotland.

Diplomatic Service and Overseas List

- Maurice Herbert Davis, O.B.E., Chief Justice of the West Indies Associated States Supreme Court.
- Michael Alexander Robert Young-Herries, O.B.E, M.C. For services to the community and to commerce in Hong Kong.
- John Farley Spry, lately Acting President of the East African Court of Appeal.

==== Australian States ====
State of New South Wales

- Harold Herbert Dickinson, Chairman of the New South Wales Public Service Board.

State of Queensland

- Arnold Lucas Bennett, Q.C, of Auchenflower. For services as an outstanding legal advocate.
- Neville Vicars Henderson, C.B.E., of Hamilton. For services to the legal profession.

State of Western Australia

- The Honourable Leslie Charles Diver, J.P. For services in parliament, in local government and to the community.

=== Order of the Bath ===
==== Knight Grand Cross of the Order of the Bath (GCB) ====
- Sir Philip Rogers, K.C.B., C.M.G., Permanent Secretary, Department of Health and Social Security.

==== Knight Commander of the Order of the Bath (KCB) ====
- Vice Admiral Ian Easton, D.S.C.
- Vice Admiral John Devereux Treacher.
- Major-General David George House, C.B.E., M.C., late Infantry, Colonel Commandant The Light Division, Colonel Commandant Small Arms School Corps.
- Major-General Horace Rollo Squarey Pain, C.B., M.C., late Royal Armoured Corps, Colonel Commandant Military Provost Staff Corps.
- Major-General William Norman Roy Scotter, O.B.E., M.C., late Infantry, Colonel The King's Own Royal Border Regiment.
- Air Marshal Ivor Gordon Broom, C.B., C.B.E., D.S.O., D.F.C., A.F.C., Royal Air Force.
- Peter Gordon Henderson, Clerk of the Parliaments, House of Lords.
- Fred Matthias Kearns, C.B., M.C., Second Permanent Secretary, Ministry of Agriculture, Fisheries and Food.
- Patrick Dalmahoy Nairne, C.B., M.C., Second Permanent Secretary, Cabinet Office.
- Norman Charles Price, C.B, Chairman, Board of Inland Revenue.
- Henry Yellowlees, C.B., Chief Medical Officer, Department of Health and Social Security.

==== Companion of the Order of the Bath (CB) ====
Military Division

- Rear Admiral Brian Byrne Mungo.
- Rear Admiral Stanley Lawrence McArdle, M.V.O., G.M.
- Major General Edgar George Derek Pounds, Royal Marines.
- Surgeon Rear Admiral George Augustus Binns, Q.H.S.
- Major-General Victor Harry John Carpenter, M.B.E., late Royal Corps of Transport, Colonel Commandant Royal Corps of Transport.
- Major-General Geoffrey de Egglesfield Collin, M.C., late Royal Regiment of Artillery.
- Major-General Archibald Rae Cornock, O.B.E., late Royal Army Ordnance Corps.
- Major-General Timothy May Creasey, O.B.E., late Infantry.
- Major-General Peter John Hall Leng, M.B.E., M.C., late Infantry.
- Air Vice-Marshal Roy David Austen-Smith, D.F.C., Royal Air Force.
- Air Vice-Marshal Colin Weall Coulthard, A.F.C., Royal Air Force.
- Air Vice-Marshal John Chegwyn Thomas Downey, D.F.C., A.F.C., Royal Air Force.
- Air Vice-Marshal John Thornett Lawrence, C.B.E., A.F.C., Royal Air Force (Retired).

Civil Division

- Francis Russell Barratt, Deputy Secretary, H.M. Treasury.
- David Ernest Belham, Principal Assistant Solicitor, Department of Employment.
- Augustus Fitzhardinge Maurice Berkeley, lately Chief Registrar in Bankruptcy of the High Court.
- John Outhit Harold Burrough, C.B.E., Foreign and Commonwealth Office.
- Alun Sylvester-Evans, Deputy Chief Executive, Property Services Agency, Department of the Environment.
- Tony Richard Hillier Godden, Secretary, Scottish Economic Planning Department.
- David Cuthbert Lyall Holland, Librarian, House of Commons.
- Edward Alexander Johnston, Government Actuary.
- David le Brun Jones, Deputy Secretary, Department of Industry.
- Victor Harry Burton Macklen, Deputy Chief Adviser (Projects and Nuclear), Ministry of Defence.
- Wulf Rudoe, Under Secretary, Department of Health and Social Security.
- Frank William Glaves-Smith, Deputy Director General, Office of Fair Trading.
- Derek Ronald James Stephen, Deputy Under-secretary of State, Ministry of Defence.
- Kenneth Taylor, Secretary, Export Credits Guarantee Department.
- Leonard Williams, Deputy Secretary, Department of Energy.
- Henry Woodhouse, Principal Assistant Solicitor, Department of the Environment.
- John Moss Woolf, Deputy Chairman, Board of Customs and Excise.
- Eric David Wright, Deputy Under-Secretary of State, Home Office.

=== Order of St Michael and St George ===
==== Knight Grand Cross of the Order of St Michael and St George (GCMG) ====
- Sir Edward Tomkins, K.C.M.G., C.V.O., H.M. Ambassador, Paris.

===== Australian States =====
State of New South Wales

- Sir Robert William Askin, K.C.M.G., lately Premier of New South Wales.

==== Knight Commander of the Order of St Michael and St George (KCMG) ====
- David Lee Cole, C.M.G., M.C., H.M. Ambassador, Bangkok.
- Derek Sherborne Lindsell Dodson, C.M.G., M.C., H.M. Ambassador, Brasilia.
- Donald Claude Tebbit, C.M.G., Foreign and Commonwealth Office.
- Paul Hervé Giraud Wright, C.M.G., O.B.E., lately H.M. Ambassador, Beirut.

===== Australian States =====
State of Victoria

- The Honourable Mr Justice John Mclntosh Young, Q.C., Lieutenant-Governor of Victoria.

==== Companion of the Order of St Michael and St George (CMG) ====
- Joseph Dunthorne Briggs Fowells, D.S.C., Assistant Director General (Regional), The British Council.
- Michael Lawrence McCaul, Senior Technical Adviser, Ministry of Defence.
- John Malcolm Mackintosh, Assistant Secretary, Cabinet Office.
- Professor Dudley Seers, For services to overseas development.
- Graeme McDonald Wilson, British Civil Aviation Representative in the Far East.
- Henry Francis Bartlett, O.B.E., H.M., Ambassador, Asuncion.
- Julian Leonard Bullard, Foreign and Commonwealth Office.
- Roger William Houssemayne du Boulay, C.V.O, British Resident Commissioner, Vila, New Hebrides.
- Eleanor Jean Emery, British High Commissioner, Gaborone.
- Robert Alexander Farquharson, H.M. Consul-General, San Francisco.
- Robert Louis Fitt, lately President of the International Federation of Consulting Engineers.
- Peter Martin Foster, United Kingdom Permanent Representative to the Council of Europe, Strasbourg.
- Major John Emsley Fretwell, Foreign and Commonwealth Office.
- David George Holland, Foreign and Commonwealth Office.
- David Harold Jordan, M.B.E., Director of Commerce and Industry, Hong Kong.
- Desmond Frederick Parkinson, Foreign and Commonwealth Office.
- James Granville William Ramage, lately H.M. Ambassador, Aden.
- Charles Stuart Roberts, British High Commissioner, Bridgetown.
- David Arthur Roberts, H.M. Ambassador, Damascus.
- Albert Edward Saunders, O.B.E., lately H.M. Consul-General, Dubai.
- Brian Francis Slevin, O.B.E., Q.P.M, C.P.M., Commissioner of Police, Hong Kong.

===== Australian States =====
State of Victoria

- The Honourable Lindsay Hamilton Simpson Thompson. For services as a Minister of the Crown.

State of Queensland

- Frederick Tivoli Hooper, of East Ipswich. For services to the community.

State of Western Australia

- George Henry Chessell. For services to the community.

=== Royal Victorian Order ===
==== Knight Commander of the Royal Victorian Order (KCVO) ====
- Andrew Hunter Carnwath.
- John Pendrill Charles, M.C.
- Rear-Admiral Ronald Stephen Forrest.
- Deputy Commissioner James Starritt, C.V.O., Metropolitan Police.
- Robert Christopher Mackworth Mackworth-Young, C.V.O.

==== Commander of the Royal Victorian Order (CVO) ====
- Robert Temple Armstrong, C.B.
- John Arkwright Bonham-Carter, D.S.O., O.B.E., E.R.D.
- Lieutenant-Colonel William Scott Lonnie, C.B.E., M.V.O., M.C.
- Kenneth William Stewart Mackenzie, C.M.G.
- William Reginald James Pullen, M.V.O.

==== Member of the Royal Victorian Order (MVO) ====
Fourth Class

- Commander John Burgess, Royal Navy.
- John Pilkington Clayton.
- Victoria Mary Blanche, Mrs Lonsdale.
- John William McNelly, M.V.O.
- Chief Superintendent Albert John Pilcher, Metropolitan Police.
- Commander Patrick Barton Rowe, Royal Navy.

Fifth Class

- Algernon John Robert Greaves, M.B.E.
- John Oswald Hitchings.
- Jean Pierre Malan.
- Leslie Shedwell Mutton.
- Inspector Roy Charles Smith, Metropolitan Police.
- James Edward Walton.
- Arthur Ernest Wollaston.

Note: At this time the two lowest classes of the Royal Victorian Order were "Member (fourth class)" and "Member (fifth class)", both with post-nominals MVO. "Member (fourth class)" was renamed "Lieutenant" (LVO) from the 1985 New Year Honours onwards.

==== Royal Victorian Medal (Gold) (RVM) ====
- Percy Benham.
- Harry Hubbard.

==== Royal Victorian Medal (Silver) (RVM) ====
- Alec Henry Beasley.
- William John Burge.
- George William Bushell.
- Miss Pauline Patricia Dent.
- Chief Technician Christopher John Harrison, Royal Air Force.
- James Alfred Hughes.
- Pipe Major Leslie Vivian Norman de Laspée, London Scottish.
- Arthur May.
- Bernard Mummery.
- Chief Ordnance Electrician James Thomas O'Neill.
- Police Constable Norman Scarlett, Metropolitan Police.
- Chief Technician David Michael Trenchard, Royal Air Force.
- George Tuck.
- Miss Patricia Loretto Turner.

=== Order of the British Empire ===
==== Knight Grand Cross of the Order of the British Empire (GBE) ====
- Admiral Sir Derek Empson, K.C.B., A.D.C.
- General Sir William Jackson, K.C.B., O.B.E., M.C., A.D.C. Gen., M.A., late Corps of Royal Engineers, Colonel Commandant Corps of Royal Engineers, Colonel Gurkha Engineers, Colonel Commandant Royal Army Ordnance Corps.
- Air Chief Marshal Sir Denis Smallwood, K.C.B., C.B.E., D.S.O., D.F.C., Royal Air Force.

==== Dame Commander of the Order of the British Empire (DBE) ====
- Miss Bridget D'Oyly Carte. For services to the D'Oyly Carte Opera Trust Ltd.
- Miss Frances Violet Gardner (Mrs Qvist), Dean, Royal Free Hospital School of Medicine.
- Miss Wendy Hiller, O.B.E. (Wendy Margaret, Mrs Gow), Actress.
- Miss Margaret Henderson Kidd, Q.C. (Mrs Macdonald), lately Sheriff Principal, Sheriffdom of Perth and Angus.
- Miss Vera Lynn, O.B.E. (Vera Margaret, Mrs Lewis), Singer. For charitable services.
- Mildred Betty, Mrs Ridley. For services to the Church of England.

===== Australian States =====
State of New South Wales

- Helen Frances, Mrs Blaxland, O.B.E. For services to the community.

State of Victoria

- Miss Joyce Margaretta Daws, of West Heidelberg. For services to medicine.

==== Knight Commander of the Order of the British Empire (KBE) ====
- Major-General Hugh Patrick Cunningham, O.B.E., late Corps of Royal Engineers.
- Ralph Melton Bateman, President, Confederation of British Industry.
- Jasper Quintus Hollom, Deputy Governor, Bank of England.
- Denys Tudor Emil Roberts, C.B.E., Q.C., Colonial Secretary, Hong Kong.
- Sydney Martin Stadler, C.B.E. For services to the British community in El Salvador and to Anglo-Salvadorean relations.

===== Australian States =====
State of New South Wales

- The Honourable Eric Archibald Willis, C.M.G., M.L.A., lately Deputy Premier of New South Wales.

==== Commander of the Order of the British Empire (CBE) ====
Military Division

Royal Navy

- Captain Ronald Day Butt, Royal Navy.
- Cynthia Felicity Joan Cooke, R R.C., Matron-in-Chief, Queen Alexandra's Royal Naval Nursing Service.
- Commodore Robin William Garson, Royal Navy.
- Commodore Sydney Robert Hack, O.B.E., Royal Navy.
- Commodore Frank Derek Patterson, R.D., Royal Naval Reserve

Army

- Colonel Francis Hugh Briggs Boshell, D.S.O., M.B.E. (112813), late Infantry.
- Brigadier Denis William Venables Patrick O'Flaherty, D.S.O. (106695), late Royal Regiment of Artillery.
- Colonel John Patrick Groom, M.B.E. (403475), late Corps of Royal Engineers.
- Colonel Roger Michael Perrett (266600), Royal Army Pay Corps.
- Brigadier Geoffrey Proudman, M.B.E., A.D.C. (217295), late Royal Corps of Signals.
- Brigadier Richard Hopkins Purvis, M.B.E. (137112), late Royal Regiment of Artillery.
- Colonel David Milner Woodford (427802), late Infantry.

Royal Air Force

- Air Vice-Marshal Donald Arthur Pocock, O.B.E., Royal Air Force Regiment.
- Air Commodore Francis Clare Padfield, Royal Air Force.
- Acting Air Commodore John Langston, Royal Air Force.
- Group Captain Victor Sydney Henry Duclos, D.F.C., Royal Air Force.
- Group Captain Edward Stanley Williams, O.B.E., Royal Air Force.

Civil Division

- Marie, Mrs. Jahoda Albu. For services to Psychology.
- Arnold Steadman Aldis, Postgraduate Dean and Director of Postgraduate Medical Services, Univer- sity Hospital of Wales.
- John Allison. For services to local government in West Glamorgan.
- Donald Ian Alston. For services to agriculture in Suffolk.
- Leslie William Lewellyn Alston, Chairman and Managing Director, Alston Group of Companies.
- Miss Mary Frances Applebey, O.B.E., For public services and particularly to mental health.
- Tom Baynham, O.B.E., lately Chairman, South Yorkshire County Council.
- Miss Constance Biddulph, Area Nursing Officer, Manchester AreaHealth Authority.
- Walter George Bor, Partner, Llewelyn-Davies, Weeks, Forestier-Walker and Bor, Architects and Town Planners.
- Olive Joan, Mrs. Boulind. For services to the Women's National Commission.
- William John Bray, Director of Research, Post Office.
- Alfred Joseph Brayshaw, O.B.E., Secretary, The Magistrates' Association of England and Wales.
- Frederic Stanley William Brimblecombe, Consultant Paediatrician, Royal Devon and Exeter Hospital.
- Horace Wilfred Browne, Assistant Secretary, Ministry of Defence.
- John Campbell McClure Browne, Professor of Obstetrics and Gynaecology, University of London.
- Patrick Sarsfield Byrne, O.B.E., Professor of General Practice, University of Manchester.
- John Christopher Cadbury, President, The Society for the Promotion of Nature Reserves.
- Dennis Brian Close. For services to Cricket.
- Miss Fay Compton (Virginia Lilian Emmeline, Mrs. Shotter), Actress.
- George William Cooke, F.R.S., Chief Scientific Officer, Agricultural Research Council.
- George Patrick Cooper, Q.F.S.M., lately Firemaster, City of Glasgow Fire Service.
- John Morton Vernon Cotterell, O.B E., D L. For services to local government in Cheshire and to conservation.
- Thomas Cowan, Senior Chief Inspector, Department of Education, Northern Ireland.
- Norman Rene Del Mar, Conductor.
- Robert James Eayrs, Deputy Controller, Central Office, Newcastle, Department of Health and Social Security.
- Robert George Fenwick, Q.P.M., H.M. Inspector of Constabulary.
- Patrick Edmund Gallaher, Chairman, North West Region, British Gas Corporation.
- Jack Forrest Gill, Deputy Chairman and Finance Director, Associated Television Corporation Ltd.
- David Glass, lately Controller of Stamps and Taxes, Scotland, Board of Inland Revenue.
- Trevor Walworth Goodwin, F.R.S., Johnstone Professor of Biochemistry, University of Liverpool.
- Malcolm Fayerweather Gordon, Chairman, Northern Ireland.Training Council.
- Hamish Brown Grant, Scottish Secretary, Confederation of British Industry.
- James Currie Grant, Editor, The Aberdeen Press and Journal.
- Sylvia Mary Gray, M.B.E., lately Chairman, National Federation of Women's Institutes.
- Hedley Bernard Greenborough, Chief Executive and Managing Director, Shell-Mex and B.P. Ltd.
- Kenneth McLeish Hamilton, Chairman and Managing Director, Blackwood Morton and Sons (Holdings) Ltd.
- Thomas Henderson, lately Director of Education, Midlothian.
- Henry Herron, Regional Procurator-Fiscal of Glasgow and Strathkelvin.
- Professor Frederick George Thomas Holliday, F.R.S.E., lately Acting Principal and Vice-Chancellor, University of Stirling.
- Thomas Charles Hudson, Chairman, International Computers Holdings Ltd.
- The Right Reverend John Taylor Hughes, Bishop of Croydon, Bishop to H.M. Forces.
- Alan Hunter, Director, Royal Greenwich Observatory.
- Phillip Kenneth King, Sculptor.
- Ernest Olaf Lane, D.F.C., A.F.C., Solicitor to the Metropolitan Police.
- Philip Arthur Larkin, Poet and Novelist.
- Robert Leslie Edward Lawrence, O.B.E., E.R.D., Member, British Railways Board.
- Douglas Charles Lee, O.B.E., Assistant Secretary, H.M. Treasury.
- Thomas Lord, E.R.D., Director-General, West Yorkshire Passenger Transport Executive.
- John Lunch, V.R.D., Director-General of the Port of London Authority.
- John Walter Guerrier Lund, F.R.S, Deputy Chief Scientific Officer, The Freshwater Biological Association.
- William Hamilton McKay, lately County Treasurer Lanarkshire County Council.
- Andrew Sinclair McLean, Director, National Radiological Protection Board.
- Keith Morrison McLeod, lately Board Member and Financial Controller, British Airports Authority.
- Patrick Joseph Manson, M.C., E.R.D., Chairman, Northern Ireland Postal and Telecommunications Board.
- Norman Marshall. For services to Drama.
- Professor Denis James Matthews, Pianist.
- Lady Alexandra Naldera Metcalfe. For services to the Save the Children Fund.
- Michael Humfrey Middleton, Director, Civic Trust.
- Archibald George Milne, Chairman, South Eastern Electricity Board.
- David Morgan Milne. For services to agriculture in Scotland.
- The Honourable David Bernard Montgomery, Overseas Trade Consultant. For services to Export.
- Frederick William Walton Morley, Divisional Director (Design) Rolls-Royce (1971) Ltd.
- Martin Grenville Moss, Deputy Chairman, Design Council.
- John Arnaud Robin Grey Murray, M.B.E., Chairman, John Murray (Publishers) Ltd.
- Leslie Ronald Mustill, M.B E., Assistant Secretary, Department of the Environment.
- William Reginald Nichols, T.D., Clerk of the Salters Company.
- Kenneth Albert Noble, Deputy Chairman, Price Commission.
- Oliver Nugent, Assistant Director of Public Prosecutions.
- Francis Walter Oakley, Chairman of Governors, Polytechnic of Central London.
- Harold Alfred Parfitt, O.B.E., Senior Director, Department of Industry.
- Stanley Parr, Q.P.M., Chief Constable, Lancashire Constabulary.
- Allen Dain Percival, Principal, Guildhall School of Music and Drama.
- Cyril Thomas Howe Plant, O.BE., General Secretary, Inland Revenue Staff Federation.
- Brigadier Robert Home Stewart Popham, O B.E, lately Swordbearer, City of London.
- John Dennis Profumo, O.B.E. For services at Toynbee Hall.
- John Stanton Shirley-Quirk, Singer.
- William Brian Rankin, Member, Northern Ireland Standing Advisory Commission on Human Rights.
- Alexander Meadows Rendel, M.B.E., lately Diplomatic Correspondent, The Times.
- Peter William John Reynolds, Group Managing Director, Ranks Hovis McDougall Ltd.
- Harry Ridehalge, Senior Partner, Sir William Halcrow and Partners. For services to Export.
- Gordon James Roberts, Chairman, Northamptonshire Area Health Authority.
- John Russell, Art Critic.
- Emmaline Juanita, Mrs. Salt, Member, Advisory Council for Probation and After-Care.
- Professor Richard Selwyn Francis Schilling, Director, TUC Centenary Institute of Occupational Health, London School of Hygiene and Tropical Medicine.
- Norman Siddall, Deputy Chairman, National Coal Board.
- Stefan Slabczynski, M.B.E., lately Keeper of Conservation, The Tate Gallery.
- Alfred Bernard Smith, lately Non-Executive Chairman, Rover Triumph Division, British Leyland Motor Corporation Ltd.
- Philip Walter Smith, Executive Vice-President, British Textile Employers' Association.
- Theodore Morris Sudden, F.R S., Chief Executive, Shell Research Ltd.
- Edward Merrett Summers, Managing Director, British Steel Corporation (Chemicals) Ltd.
- Leslie Ernest Thompson, Chairman, Westinghouse Brake and Signal Company Ltd. For services to Export.
- Thomas Edward Trinder, Comedian. For charitable services.
- Robert St. John Pitts-Tucker, lately General Secretary, Headmasters' Association and Headmasters' Conference.
- Eric Gardner Turner, F.B.A., Professor of Papyrology, University College, University of London.
- James Pellatt Turner, O.B.E., Executive Director, H.M. Stationery Office.
- Peter Alexander Ustinov. For services to the Theatre.
- Thomas Alfred James WARLOW, Assistant Secretary, Department of Education and Science.
- Norman Waterworth, Managing Director, David Brown Gear Industries Ltd.
- Trenham Desmond Weaterhead, O B.E., Managing Director, Hunting Surveys and Consultants Ltd.
- John Ireland West, Headmaster, The Dukeries Comprehensive School, New Ollerton, Nottinghamshire.
- Geoffrey Harold Weston, Regional Administrator, North West Thames Regional Health Authority.
- Owen Glyn Williams. For services to agriculture.
- Michael John Cecil Hutton-Wilson, lately Deputy Chairman, Albright and Wilson Ltd.
- Frederick Ferdinand Wolff, Chairman, The Federation of Commodity Associations.
- Miss Sheila Dorothy Wood, General Secretary, Association of Assistant Mistresses.
- Austin William Woodland, Deputy Director, Institute of Geological Sciences.
- John Allen Young, Chairman, Young and Company's Brewery Ltd.

==== Officer of the Order of the British Empire (OBE) ====
Military Division

Royal Navy

- Commander Thomas Victor Giles Binney, Royal Navy.
- Commander (I) Jeffrey Watson Boughey, Royal Navy.
- Commander Michael Charles Clapham, Royal Navy.
- Commander (SD) Thomas Robert Clarkson, Royal Navy.
- Commander Ronald William Colclough, Royal Navy.
- Commander Brian Douglas Brayley Gresham, Royal Navy.
- Commander Patrick Alan Colin Harland, Royal Navy.
- Lieutenant Colonel Michael Richard Marchant, Royal Marines.
- Captain Michael Duncan Penney, R.D., A.D.C, Royal Naval Reserve.
- Acting Captain David Gerard Robertson, Royal Navy.
- Commander John Richard Shand, Royal Navy.
- Commander David John Southgate Wright, Royal Navy

Army

- Lieutenant-Colonel John Oswald Claud Alexander (445775), Royal Corps of Signals.
- Major (Acting Lieutenant-Colonel) Frank Derek Carson (300353), Queen's Own Highlanders, (Seaforth and Camerons).
- Lieutenant-Colonel Harold Isaac Charkham (204931), Royal Corps of Transport (Now Retired).
- Lieutenant-Colonel Lawrence Arthur Aylwin Cox (334317), Royal Regiment of Artillery.
- Lieutenant-Colonel John Pearl Cross (417265), Royal Regiment of Artillery.
- Lieutenant-Colonel Michael Paul St. Francis Dracopoli (414841), The Queen's Regiment.
- Lieutenant-Colonel James Ainsworth Campden Gabriel Eyre (441247), The Blues and Royals (Royal Horse Guards and 1st Dragoons).
- Lieutenant-Colonel Wulfram Edler Irmler Forsythe-Jauch (466213), Royal Army Medical Corps.
- Colonel (Acting) John George Harrison (351000), Army Cadet Force, Territorial and Army Volunteer Reserve.
- Lieutenant-Colonel Patrick Rolt Shaun Jackson (420860), Royal Regiment of Artillery.
- Major (Acting Lieutenant-Colonel) (Local Colonel) Raymond Clephn Werner Nightingale, M.B.E. (345300), The Royal Green Jackets.
- Lieutenant-Colonel Gerald Joseph Partridge (Non Medical) (451646), Royal Army Medical Corps (now retired).
- Lieutenant-Colonel Christopher James Pike, D.S.O. (433572), 10th Princess Mary's Own Gurkha Rifles.
- Lieutenant-Colonel Charles Elwyn Potts (393254), The Worcestershire and Shenvood Foresters Regiment (29th/45th Foot).
- Lieutenant-Colonel (Now Colonel) David Calthorp Thorne (433251) The Royal Anglian Regiment.
- Lieutenant-Colonel (Acting Colonel) Paul Kenneth Arthur Todd (343310), Royal Corps of Transport.
- Colonel (Acting) Roy John Trett, T.D. (75383), Army Cadet Force, Territorial and Army Volunteer Reserve.

Royal Air Force

- Acting Group Captain (now Group Captain) Colin Mackenzie King, Royal Air Force.
- Wing Commander Peter Clubbe (3044781), Royal Air Force.
- Wing Commander Douglas Cook (2410819), Royal Air Force.
- Wing Commander Kenneth John Dix, A.F.C. (4031323), Royal Air Force.
- Wing Commander John Adams Heatherill (154380), Royal Air Force. '
- Wing Commander Jack Morton Henderson, A.F.C. (4042817), Royal Air Force.
- Wing Commander (now Group Captain) Norman Jackson (505533), Royal Air Force.
- Wing Commander Ewen Malcolm Kennedy (3504637), Royal Air Force.
- Wing Commander Anthony John Richards (2785173), Royal Air Force.
- Wing Commander Alexander Stuart Buchanan Smith (551175), Royal Air Force.
- Wing Commander Christopher Sutcliffe (501679), Royal Air Force.
- Acting Wing Commander Geoffrey Eastwood, D.F.M. (115622), Royal Air Force Volunteer Reserve (Training Branch).

Civil Division

- Eric Sydney Allwright, Quality Control Director, Commercial Aircraft Division, British Aircraft Corporation Ltd., Weybridge.
- John William Anderson, Principal, Department of Energy.
- Ernest Leonard Archer, D.S.O, A.F.C., Director of Personnel, The Boots Company Ltd., Nottingham.
- Norman Henry Ash, Deputy Crown Estate Surveyor, Crown Estate Commissioners.
- Francis Dalton Ashby, Assistant Comptroller, National Debt Office.
- Kenneth Latham Ashurst, H.M. Inspector of Schools, Department of Education and Science.
- Robert Philip Sidney Bache, Member, West Midlands Economic Planning Council.
- Roy Ernest Bailhache, Jurat, Royal Court of Jersey.
- Sydney William Walter Barker, lately Licensing Officer, Lancashire County Council.
- Captain Keith Barnett, R.D., lately Commodore Master, General Cargo Division, Peninsular and Oriental Group.
- Keith Beale, Principal Professional and Technology Officer, Department of the Environment.
- Miriam, Mrs. Beardsley, Chairman, Newark District Council.
- Ralph Beesley, General Manager, Product Support, Industrial and Marine Division, Coventry, Rolls-Royce (1971) Ltd. For services to Export.
- Frank Erskine Bell, Director, The Bell Educational Trust.
- Edith Annie, Mrs. Bidmead. For services to the community in Surbiton and Kingston-upon-Thames.
- James Biggar, Farmer, Kirkcudbright. For services to agriculture in Scotland.
- Samuel Ramsay Blackley, M.B.E., Managing Director and Secretary, British Wool Marketing Board.
- Francis William Bourne, Headmaster, Princess Margaret School, Taunton.
- Harold Alfred Nelson Brockman, Architecture Correspondent, Financial Times.
- Robert George Archibald Brown, Chairman, Executive Committee, The Thistle Foundation, Edinburgh.
- Wilkie Burdon, Warden, South Glamorgan Outdoor Studies Centre.
- Miss Hester Nancy Burman. For services to the Theatre particularly in the Midlands.
- Raymond Naylor Buxton, B.E.M, Q.P.M., Chief Constable, Hertfordshire Constabulary.
- James Dawson Campbell, M.B.E., General Manager, West of Scotland Trustee Savings Bank.
- Captain John Gerard Canning, Foreign and Commonwealth Office.
- Lionel Alexander Carey, Chairman, Transport Users Consultative Committee for East Anglia.
- Kenneth Charles Graham Chambers, M.B.E., General Treasurer, The Royal British Legion.
- Anthony George John Chandler, Clerk to Justices, Guildhall Justice Room, City of London.
- Donald Manwaring Cherry, Director-General, Transmission Development and Construction Division, Central Electricity Generating Board.
- John Lester Clifford, Managing Director, Frank W. Clifford Ltd.
- Professor Ernst Joseph Cohn. For services to English Law.
- Patrick Victor Collier, Q.P.M., Deputy Assistant Commissioner, Metropolitan Police.
- Miss Sheila Margaret Collins, Director of Nursing Education, Tower Hamlets Health District, City and East London Area Health Authority.
- Hugh Homfray Cooper, Lately Adviser on Magistrates' Courts, Home Office.
- Edward George Cornish, Chairman and Joint Managing Director, G. E. Wallis and Sons Ltd.
- David Croney, Senior Principal Scientific Officer, Department of the Environment.
- John Ernest Cornwall Lewis-Crosby, Secretary, Northern-Ireland Regional Committee, The National Trust.
- William Francis Jack Cuthbertson, Director, Glaxo Research Company Ltd.
- Harold William Darvill, Assistant Secretary, Public Works Loan Board.
- Harry Graham Davies, General Practitioner, Llanidloes, Powys.
- Miss Clare Lawson Dick, Controller, Radio 4, British Broadcasting Corporation.
- James Henry Dollan, Freelance Journalist. For services to journalism in Scotland.
- Maurice Drury, Superintending Engineer, Department of Health and Social Security.
- Clive Robert Bertram Dunn, Actor.
- James Gordon Durward, Chairman, Scottish Professional Golfers' Association.
- Ronald Frank Dyer, Principal Scientific Officer, Atomic Energy Research Establishment, Harwell.
- Norman Denis Egan, First Class Valuer, Board of Inland Revenue.
- Gwyneth, Mrs. Evans, Development Commissioner, Wales.
- John Albert Evans. For services to the Magistracy in the West Midlands.
- Thomas Bernard Fahy, Deputy Secretary, Birmingham Chamber of Industry and Commerce. For services to Export.
- Miss Barbara Noel Fawkes, lately Chief Education Officer, General Nursing Council for England and Wales.
- James Maul Flemming, B E M., Chief Fire Officer, Hertfordshire Fire Brigade.
- Benjamin Edward Foster. For services to Cycling.
- Seth Allen Fox, lately General Secretary, National Association of Youth Clubs.
- John Henry French, Chairman, National, Local and Public Authorities Savings Committee.
- Douglas Ernest Gabb. For services to local government in Leeds.
- Miss Elizabeth Ada Gee, lately Physical Education Adviser, Wirral Metropolitan District, Merseyside Metropolitan Council.
- Arthur Walter Goodliffe, Technical Director, Flight Refuelling Ltd., Wimborne, Dorset. For Services to Export.
- Victor Pennington Gorringe, Editor-in-Chief, Brighton Evening Argus.
- Cyril Granger, Assistant Director Engineering, R.A.F., Medmenham, Ministry of Defence.
- Captain Robert Patrick Seafield Grant, D.S.C., R.N. (Retd ), Chief Administrative Officer and Secretary, The Ditchley Foundation.
- Clifford Gravell. For services to the Air Training Corps in the North West.
- George Norman Green, Chief Cashier, Lloyds Bank Ltd.
- Neill Griffiths, Senior Principal Scientific Officer, Royal Armament Research and Development Establishment, Ministry of Defence.
- William John Barrett Groves, Area Administrator, Wirral Area Health Authority.
- Gordon Henry Hafter, Rolling Stock Engineer (Railways), London Transport Executive.
- Robert James Hanna, Member, Ulster Countryside Committee.
- Reginald Ralph Hardwicke, D.F.C., Secretary, Eastern Region, British Gas Corporation.
- Henry Forsyth Hardy, lately Director, Films of Scotland Committee.
- Margaret Yvonne, Mrs. Hastings, Director, Sussex Branch, British Red Cross Society.
- Bernard Hazel, lately Yorkshire and Humberside Regional Member, National Savings Committee.
- John Charles Hermon, Assistant Chief Constable, Royal Ulster Constabulary.
- Frank Hiley, Director of Finance, Aycliffe and Peterlee Development Corporations.
- John Selby Hillyer. For services to Dr. Barnardo's.
- Joseph Tennyson Hilton, Leader, Oldham Metropolitan Borough Council.
- Arthur Holden, Director (Refining) Texaco Ltd. and Manager Pembroke Refinery.
- Alec Richard Holmes, Computer Manager, Greater London Council.
- William Desmond Hooper, A.F.C., Technical Adviser, Ministry of Defence.
- Philip Stanley Hough, Farmer, Devon. For services to agriculture.
- Charles Talbot Hurst, D L., Chairman, Northern Ireland Council, Save the Children Fund.
- Miss Helen Margaret Jackson, Headmistress, Willingsworth High School, Tipton, West Midlands.
- Thomas Hanning Jackson, Assistant Chief Surveyor, Airworthiness Division, Civil Aviation Authority.
- William Maxwell Jamieson, Consultant Physician (Communicable Diseases), Tayside Health Board.
- Miss Miriam Karlin (Miss Miriam Samuels), Actress.
- Mahendra Nath Kaul. For services to race relations.
- John Millar Kelly, Chairman and Managing Director, Falls Flax Spinning Company Ltd.
- Alan Ridsdale Kennedy, lately Senior Partner, Gurney and Company, lately Official Shorthand Writer, Houses of Parliament.
- Professor Peter Linley Kirby, Director of Research, Welwyn Electric Ltd.
- Frank Paul Max Korn, Director, Constructors John Brown Ltd. For services to Export.
- William Herbert Langwell. For services to the preservation of archives.
- Thomas Stewart Lansley, Chairman, Medical Laboratory Technicians Board.
- Herbert Arthur Leech, Clerk-in-Charge, Greenwich Hospital.
- Jack Leicester, Director of Research, British Launderers' Research Association
- John Denis Leonard. For public services in South Wales.
- Michael Joseph Linnett, General Practitioner, London, S.W.1.
- Clifford Lloyd, Secretary/Treasurer, Professional Footballers' Association.
- Alma, Mrs. Lodge, Headmistress, Sylvan First School, Poole.
- Sydney Leonard London, Assistant General Manager, Navy, Army and Air Force Institutes.
- Basil Gunson Lord, M.B.E., Foreign and Commonwealth Office.
- Robert James Lowe. For services to local government in Lewisham.
- Ralph Robert Lyne, lately Assistant to Chairman, Imperial Chemical Industries Fibres Ltd.
- David Alexander Lyons. For services to the community in Southwark.
- Allan Macdonald, Chief Executive, Shipbuilding Industry Training Board.
- Miss Elizabeth Houston Galloway McIntyre, Scottish District Secretary, National Union of Hosiery and Knitwear Workers.
- George McKay, Director of Technical Services, National Bus Company.
- Annie Sloan, Mrs. Mackie, lately Councillor, Kilmarnock Town Council.
- Florence Patricia Alice, Mrs. McLaughlin, Chairman, Steering Group on Food Freshness. For services to consumer interests especially in relation to food.
- James William Mark, Principal Professional Technology Officer, Department of Industry.
- Alan Spencer Martyn, Assistant Director (Scientific) Ministry of Defence.
- Kenneth William Matchett, lately General Manager and Secretary, Bournemouth Symphony Orchestra.
- John Blades Mathers, Director, G R. Hullock Ltd., Manchester.
- Miss Helen Monica Maurice (Mrs. Jackson), Managing Director, The Wolf Safety Lamp Company Ltd.
- Ian Colin Marfrey Maxwell, Deputy-Director, Inter-University Council for Higher Education Overseas.
- Stanley Mellors, Chairman, Amber Valley District Council.
- James Milhench, Secretary, United Textile Factory Workers' Association.
- Barbara Joyce, Mrs. Montagu. For services to the National Children Adoption Association.
- Commander Frank Conwy Morgan, R.N. (Retd.), Manager, Summerfield Research Station, Imperial Metal Industries Ltd., Kidderminster.
- Freda Evelyn, Mrs. Griffith Morgan, Member, Board of Visitors, H.M. Prison Channings Wood, Devon.
- Colonel George Frederick Kenneth Morgan, M.C., T.D., D.L., Chairman, South Wales Area Appeal for the Army Benevolent Fund.
- Joseph Henry Morgan, Headmaster, The Laurence Jackson School, Guisborough, Cleveland.
- Allan Thackray Morrison, Secretary, Northern Advisory Council for Further Education and Northern Counties Technical Examinations Council.
- Miss Myrtle Vivian Muskett, lately Principal, Department of Trade.
- Alexis Napier, Field Sales Manager, Thomas de la Rue and Company Ltd.
- Mary Elizabeth, Mrs. Newstead, Labour Relations Secretary, Royal College of Nursing.
- Sheila Florence Margaret, Mrs. Niblett, Chairman, Domestic Coal Consumers' Council.
- Michael Charles Oatley, Foreign and Commonwealth Office.
- Charles David Pagan, lately Clerk of the Peace, Fife.
- Victor Henry Parker, Principal Scientific Toxicology Unit, Medical Research Council.
- Betty, Mrs. Parr, H.M. Inspector of Department of Education and Science.
- Alfred Hugh Peake, Head Postmaster, Leicester, Midland Postal Board, Post Office.
- John William Roland Pearce, Regional Veterinary Officer, Ministry of Agriculture, Fisheries and Food.
- George Peat, lately County Drainage Engineer, Ross and Cromarty County Council.
- Samuel Pennington. For services to health and welfare in Northern Ireland.
- Major Leslie Petch, T.D. For services to Horse Racing.
- Miss Eileen Sarah Margaret Phillips, lately Principal, Bath College of Education.
- David Albert Philp, B.E.M., Director, Fyffes Group Ltd.
- Francis Roy Plomley, Broadcaster.
- Reginald Arthur Pomeroy, Principal, Somerset College of Arts and Technology.
- Robert William Pomeroy, Senior Principal Scientific Officer, Agricultural Research Council Meat Research Institute, Langford, Bristol.
- George Potts, Chief Contracts and Purchasing Officer, South of Scotland Electricity Board.
- James Douglas Rattenbury, Superintending Technical Officer, Department of the Environment.
- Joseph Ashley Rawlings, Headmaster, Eden School, Carlisle.
- John Eryl Lloyd Rees, Principal, Department of Industry.
- Jack Reginald Roberts, Division Director, North Central Division, Yorkshire Water Authority.
- William Foulkes Roberts, Chairman, North West Regional Sports Council.
- Douglas Robinson, lately Chorus Master, Covent Garden Opera Company.
- Barbara Noel, Mrs. Rodgers, Member, Supplementary Benefits Commission, Cheshire.
- James Niven Roger, Secretary and Legal Adviser, Cumbernauld Development Corporation.
- Miss Eleanor Gaskarth Roker, lately Area Nurse, Brentford and Harrow Area Health Authority.
- Frank William Rose. For public services in Kent.
- Jacques Rotenberg. For services to the Board of Customs and Excise.
- Miss Doreen Rothman (Mrs. Pegrum), Senior Medical Officer, Department of Health and Social Security.
- Adam Roxburgh, Chief Administrative Pharmaceutical Officer, Greater Glasgow Health Board.
- Andrew Scott, Chief Fatstock Officer, Department of Agriculture and Fisheries for Scotland
- Henry Lacy Scott, T.D., lately Senior Partner, Messrs. Lacy Scott and Sons, Auctioneers.
- Kenneth Roy Scott, Formerly Deputy Headmaster, Imberhorne Comprehensive School, East Grinstead.
- Lieutenant-Colonel Derek Leng Searle, Administrator, St. Martin-in-the-Fields Church, London.
- Ronald Stuart Sedgwick, Commercial Director, Welsh Industrial Estates Corporation.
- Miss Joyce Dalrymple Shaw, Deputy Principal, Digby Stuart College of Education, Roehampton.
- Frederick Carl Albert Shirling, Engineering Inspector, Home Office.
- Maurice Arnold Simmons, Commissioner, County of Stafford, St. John Ambulance Brigade.
- Alexander Jamieson Smith, lately County Architect, Stirling County Council.
- George Maxwell Arthur Smith, Senior Principal, Board of Customs and Excise.
- James David Smith, lately Chief Executive, Greenock Town Council.
- Sheila Agnes, Mrs. Berkery-Smith, Member, London Borough of Haringey.
- Harry Merrik Spanton, Director, North Nottinghamshire Area, National Coal Board.
- George David Speake, Technical Director, GEC-Marconi Electronics Ltd., Chelmsford.
- Donald Arthur Stringer, Port Director, Southampton, British Transport Docks Board.
- Miss Rosemary Sutcliff, Writer.
- Thomas Arthur John Tagg, Treasurer, Warwickshire Area Health Authority.
- Frederick Patrick Tanner, lately Managing Director, Howson-Algraphy Ltd. For services to Export
- John Percy West-Taylor, Registrar, University of York.
- Edward Victor Thomas, lately Managing Director, May and Baker Ltd.
- Major Sidney Gilchrist Thompson, M.C., T.D., Chairman of Trustees, The Buttle Trust.
- Miss Daphne Jill Tibbits, Assistant Chief Probation Officer, Dorset.
- William Robert Truesdale, Governor Class I, H.M. Prison, Maze, Northern Ireland.
- Albert Ernest Ullmer, Director of Building, London Borough of Camden.
- Norman Alfred Vanderpump, Director, C. J. Vander Ltd. For services to Export.
- Frederick Colbran Burgoyne Varney, Principal, Metropolitan Police Office.
- Richard George Vine, Senior Consultant Physician, Altnagelvin Hospital, Western Health and Social Services Board, Northern Ireland.
- Folliott Sandford Henry Ward. For services to local government in North Yorkshire.
- Bertram Webster, M.C., Town Clerk and Chief Executive, City of Worcester.
- John Weir, D.S.O., lately Head Teacher, Bank Street Primary School, Irvine, Ayrshire.
- Eric Lawrence Casling White, Consultant, Electric and Musical Industries Ltd.
- Leslie Arthur Widden, Senior Principal, Public Trustee Office.
- Eric Wilkes, M.B E, Professor of Community Care and General Practice, University of Sheffield.
- Edward Walter Williams. For public services in Wales.
- Quintin Campbell Wilson, lately Chief Constable, Ayrshire Constabulary.
- Alfred Lawrence Witham, Chief Engineer (Network), Independent Broadcasting Authority.
- John Philip Wolstenholme, General Secretary, Civil Service Benevolent Fund.
- Alfred Woolf. For services to the Jewish community in London.
- Andrew Young, Director, Scottish Shelton and East Moors Group, General Steels Division, British Steel Corporation.
- William Morrison Young, Director and Group General Manager, Eastern Counties Newspapers Ltd.
- George Gunter Zahler, Managing Director, Instron Ltd. For services to Export.

==== Member of the Order of the British Empire (MBE) ====
Military Division

Royal Air Force

- Squadron Leader Simon Allen Baldwin (4231394), Royal Air Force.
- Squadron Leader Leslie Edward Blackburn (3058032), Royal Air Force.
- Squadron Leader Robert Davidson Gammack (607812), Royal Air Force.
- Squadron Leader Edward Anthony Harris (4173399), Royal Air Force.
- Squadron Leader Richard Cyril McKinlay (608273), Royal Air Force.
- Squadron Leader Leslie James Madders, D.F.C. (149931), Royal Air Force.
- Squadron Leader David James Perry (3504878), Royal Air Force.
- Squadron Leader Gordon George Sweetlove (579239), Royal Air Force.
- Squadron Leader Barry Dixon Wiggins (3130067), Royal Air Force (for services with the Kenya Air Force).
- Acting Squadron Leader Gordon Frank Henrico (748802), Royal Air Force Volunteer Reserve (Training Branch).
- Flight Lieutenant Peter Clifford (55022), Royal Air Force (Retired).
- Flight Lieutenant Michael John Cunningham (4232701), Royal Air Force.
- Flight Lieutenant Douglas George Lawton (772540), Royal Air Force.
- Flight Lieutenant John Boyd Nicol, B.E.M. (1340629), Royal Air Force.
- Flight Lieutenant Maurice Victor Paris, A.E. (5006746), Royal Auxiliary Air Force.
- Flight Lieutenant Graham Wilfred Shaw (4012229), Royal Air Force.
- Warrant Officer Claud Delroy Montaque Alberga (F0714100), Royal Air Force.
- Warrant Officer Frederick Bertram Brisley (C4100151), Royal Air Force.
- Warrant Officer Arthur William George Burville (P0551095), Royal Air Force.
- Warrant Officer George Stephen Egleton (H4110993), Royal Air Force.
- Warrant Officer Robert Albert Jessup (Y4000503), Royal Air Force.
- Warrant Officer Alan McKeating (L4067996), Royal Air Force.
- Warrant Officer James Manson (C4185809), Royal Air Force.
- Warrant Officer William Arthur Ponsford (C2235133), Royal Air Force.
- Warrant Officer Edward John Powell (G1411549), Royal Air Force.
- Warrant Officer Frank Charles Ambrose Read (F1165129), Royal Air Force.
- Warrant Officer William Sidney Rogers (E0632S09), Royal Air Force.
- Warrant Officer John Clough Ross (J0616638), Royal Air Force.
- Warrant Officer Peter John Hay Strutt (N0634579), Royal Air Force.

Civil Division

- Joseph Wyatt, Senior Executive Assistant, London Transport Executive

=== Order of the Companions of Honour (CH) ===
- The Right Honourable Herbert William, Baron Aylestone, C.B.E., lately Chairman, Independent Broadcasting Authority.
- The Right Honourable John William, Baron Morris of Borth-y-Gest, C.B.E, M.C. For public services in Wales.

=== Royal Red Cross ===
==== Member of the Royal Red Cross (RRC) ====
- Colonel Margaret Annie Brown (325841), Queeu Alexandra's Royal Army Nursing Corps.
- Wing Officer Margaret Mary O'Connor, A.R.R.C. (406765), Princess Mary's Royal Air Force Nursing Service.

==== Associate of the Royal Red Cross (ARRC) ====
- Major Sheila Clapham (446762), Queen Alexandra's Royal Army Nursing Corps.
- Major Mabel Miller Lyons (469515), Queen Alexandra's Royal Army Nursing Corps.
- Squadron Officer Rosemary Ann Louise Partington (407616), Princess Mary's Royal Air Force Nursing Service.

=== Bar to Air Force Cross ===
==== Royal Air Force ====
- Wing Commander Graham Charles Williams, A.F.C. (607676), Royal Air Force.
- Flight Lieutenant Peter Neville Perry, A.F.C. (4176448), Royal Air Force.

=== Air Force Cross (AFC) ===
==== Royal Air Force ====
- Wing Commander David John Seward (2420678), Royal Air Force.
- Wing Commander John Robert Walker (607624), Royal Air Force
- Squadron Leader John William Lucking (2999509), Royal Air Force.
- Squadron Leader Peter Leonard Walter Pressley (3127331), Royal Air Force.
- Flight Lieutenant David Binnie (4232335), Royal Air Force.
- Flight Lieutenant Bertie John Conchie (584543), Royal Air Force

=== Air Force Medal (AFM) ===
==== Royal Air Force ====
- M4116510 Acting Flight Sergeant James Donald Robertson, Royal Air Force

=== Queen's Police Medal (QPM) ===
==== England & Wales ====
- William John Ross, Deputy Chief Constable, Suffolk Constabulary.
- Patrick Francis Michael White, Deputy Chief Constable, North Yorkshire Police.
- Leslie Truefit Bowers, Assistant Chief Constable, Derbyshire Constabulary.
- Christopher Rowe, Assistant Chief Constable, Surrey Constabulary.
- Thomas Watkinson, Assistant Chief Constable, Lancashire Constabulary.
- Clifford Woodcock, Assistant Chief Constable, Cheshire Constabulary.
- David Clarence Dilley, Commander, Metropolitan Police.
- Emlyn Oliver Howells, Commander, Metropolitan Police.
- Peter Charles Neivens, Commander, Metropolitan Police.
- Christopher Frederick Payne, Commander, Metropolitan Police.
- Jesse Bull, Chief Superintendent, Avon and Somerset Constabulary.
- Robert Thomas Charles Coleman, Chief Superintendent, Warwickshire Constabulary.
- Godfrey Alexander Oldfield, Chief Superintendent, West Yorkshire Police.
- Jack Sutcliffe, Chief Superintendent, Merseyside Police.
- Olive Sarah Bowyer, Superintendent, Hampshire Constabulary.

==== Scotland ====
- Robert Frederick Paxton McNeill, lately Chief Constable, Dunbartonshire Constabulary.
- Alan James Elmslie, Superintendent, Grampian Police Force, formerly Superintendent, City of Aberdeen Police Force.

==== Northern Ireland ====
- Charles McConaghy, Constable, Royal Ulster Constabulary.

==== Overseas Territories ====
- Frank Hammond, Superintendent of Police, Bermuda Police Force.

==== Australian States ====
===== State of New South Wales =====
- Kenneth Brown, Superintendent, 2nd Class, New South Wales Police Force.
- Ernest Edward Canacott, Detective Superintendent, 1st Class, New South Wales Police Force.
- Cyril Albert Gammidge Davis, Superintendent, 1st Class, New South Wales Police Force.
- Harold Martin Fulton, Assistant Commissioner, New South Wales Police Force.
- Ian Alexander McLure, Inspector, 1st Class, New South Wales Police Force.
- Francis William Phelan, Superintendent, 3rd Class, New South Wales Police Force.
- Albert Horace Southern, Superintendent, 2nd Class, New South Wales Police Force.
- Ronald Gordon Webb, Superintendent, 2nd Class, New South Wales Police Force.
- Reginald Gordon Williams, Superintendent, 1st Class, New South Wales Police Force.
- Hubert Kenneth Worland, Superintendent, 3rd Class, New South Wales Police Force.

===== State of Victoria =====
- Reginald Barrie Clowes, Chief Superintendent, Victoria Police Force.
- Graham Davidson, Superintendent, Victoria Police Force.
- Francis Leo Hayes, Chief Inspector, Victoria Police Force.
- George Russell Hilderbrand, Superintendent Victoria Police Force.
- Norman Harold Hume, Chief Superintendent, Victoria Police Force.
- Martin John Nolan, Inspector, Victoria Police Force.

===== State of Queensland =====
- John Desmond Thomas Brady, Superintendent, Queensland Police Force.
- Desely Percival Chippindall, Superintendent, Queensland Police Force.
- Francis Clifford, Superintendent, Queensland Police Force.
- Michael George McCarthy, Superintendent, Queensland Police Force.
- John McSporran, Superintendent, Queensland Police Force.

===== State of Western Australia =====
- Albert Theodore Naylor, lately Superintendent, Western Australian Police Force.
- John Ronald Straughan, Superintendent, Western Australian Police Force.

== Papua New Guinea ==
=== Knight Bachelor ===
- John Gunther, C.M.G., O.B.E., of Boderim, Queensland. Lately Vice-Chancellor of the University of Papua New Guinea.

=== Order of Saint Michael and Saint George ===
==== Companion of the Order of St Michael and St George (CMG) ====
- Anthony Constantine Voutas, of Braddon, Australian Capital Territory. For services to the political development of Papua New Guinea.

=== Order of the British Empire ===
==== Knight Commander of the Order of the British Empire (KBE) ====
Civil Division

- John Guise, C.B.E., M.H.A., Deputy Chief Minister and Minister for Agriculture, Papua New Guinea.

==== Commander of the Order of the British Empire (CBE) ====
Civil Division

- Barry Blyth Holloway, M.H.A., Speaker of the House of Assembly, Papua New Guinea

==== Officer of the Order of the British Empire (OBE) ====
Civil Division

- William Eric Duncanson. Formerly Director, University of Technology, Papua New Guinea.
- Saimon Gaius, Bishop of the United Church, New Guinea Islands Region.
- Tore Lokoloko, Member of the House of Assembly and Businessman. For services to the community in Papua New Guinea in the field of economic development.
- Paulias Matane, Representative, Papua New Guinea Government Office, Washington D.C., U.S.A.
- Mrs. Andree Norma Millar, Curator of Gardens, University of Papua New Guinea.
- Oala Oala-Rarua, Commissioner, Papua New Guinea Government Commission, Australia.

==== Member of the Order of the British Empire (MBE) ====
Civil Division

- Sister Maria Theoreditis Arens, M.S.C. For services to the community in the fields of health and nursing in Papua New Guinea.
- John Bopanau Cholai. For services to the community on Manus Island, Papua New Guinea.
- John Keith Dowling. For services to Papua New Guinea in the field of business.
- Karry Frank, Lieutenant Commander, Papua New Guinea Defence Force.
- Sinaka Vakai Goava, District Court Magistrate, Grade II, Papua New Guinea.
- Kwamala Kalo, Assistant Director (Technical Division), Department of Education, Papua New Guinea.
- Wegra Kenu. For services to the community in the West Sepik District, Papua New Guinea.
- Francis John Martin. For services to commerce and the community in the East Sepik District, Papua New Guinea.
- Stahl Mileng. For services to religion and the community in the Madang District of Papua New Guinea.
- Samson Virgil Nuakona, Inspector First Class, Royal Papua New Guinea Constabulary.
- Tatie Katio Olewale. For services to local government in the Western District of Papua New Guinea.
- James Hip Ling Seeto, of Boroko. For services to the community in Papua New Guinea.
- Mae Verave, B.E.M., Force Sergeant Major, Papua New Guinea Defence Force

=== British Empire Medal (BEM) ===
Civil Division

- Peter Maut Endabukai. For services to local government in Papua New Guinea.
- Christian Gwang. For services to the community in the Salamaua area of Papua New Guinea.
- Karapen. For services to the community and local government in Wabag, Papua New Guinea.
- Agusave Karifa. For services to local government and village institutions in the Kainantu Sub-District, Papua New Guinea.
- Mrs. Elti Kunak. For services towards the advancement of women in the New Ireland District of Papua New Guinea.

=== Queen's Police Medal ===
- Bryan Alan Beattie, Superintendent, Royal Papua New Guinea Constabulary.
- William Pennias Tiden, Inspector, 1st Class, Royal Papua New Guinea Constabulary.

== Mauritius ==
=== Order of Saint Michael and Saint George ===
==== Companion of the Order of St Michael and St George (CMG) ====
- Sheik Adamjee Elahee Doomun, MBE, Chairman, Public and Police Service Commissions.

=== Order of the British Empire ===
==== Commander of the Order of the British Empire (CBE) ====
Civil Division

- Joseph Robert Antoine. For his contribution to research in sugar cane and other food crops.

==== Officer of the Order of the British Empire (OBE) ====
Civil Division

- Leon Paul Benoit Gregoire Eugene Maurice Julien. For services to the co-operative movement.

==== Member of the Order of the British Empire (MBE) ====
Civil Division

- Radah Krishn Gungoosingh. For services to local government.
- Ramduthsing Hazareesing, Superintendent, Mauritius Police Force.
- Samuel Hope Kelly. For services in the Ministry of Health.
- Veerapatren Marimootoo, Inspector, Mauritius Police Force.
- Mrs. Marie Anita White. For services in the Ministry of Health.

== Fiji ==
=== Order of the British Empire ===
==== Commander of the Order of the British Empire (CBE) ====
Civil Division

- Raman Narayan Nair, MVO., High Commissioner of Fiji in Australia.

==== Officer of the Order of the British Empire (OBE) ====
Military Division

- Lieutenant-Colonel Mosese Viti Buadromo, E.D, Commanding Officer, 2nd Battalion, Fiji Infantry Regiment.

Civil Division

- Jesoni Baleiwai Takala, Administrative Officer, Class I (Commissioner Western).

==== Member of the Order of the British Empire (MBE) ====
Civil Division

- Adi Eleni Saiki Kikau. For services to the community.
- Ram Prasad Sahadur. For services to the community.

=== British Empire Medal (BEM) ===
Civil Division

- Laiakini Rarubi, Engineer, Government vessel MV Cagimaira.

== Bahamas ==
=== Knight Bachelor ===
- Alvin Rudolph Braynen, High Commissioner for the Commonwealth of The Bahamas in London.

=== Order of the British Empire ===
==== Commander of the Order of the British Empire (CBE) ====
Civil Division

- The Honourable Charles Rhodriquez. For services to the community.

==== Member of the Order of the British Empire (MBE) ====
Civil Division

- Mrs. Edith Birdie Morris. For services to Bahamian students

=== British Empire Medal (BEM) ===
Civil Division

- Roger Farquharson, Foreman Carpenter, Ministry of Health

== Grenada ==
=== Knight Bachelor ===
- Denis Aynesley Henry, O B.E., Q.C. For services to the community.

=== Order of the British Empire ===
==== Officer of the Order of the British Empire (OBE) ====
Civil Division

- Mrs. Ines Trimmingham Davis. For services to medicine and to the community.

==== Member of the Order of the British Empire (MBE) ====
Civil Division

- Mrs. Cynthia Clair Violet McIntyre. For services to the community.
- Mrs. Thelma Marjorie Simpson. For services to the community.

== See also ==
- 1975 Queen's Birthday Honours (Australia)
