= Christo Coetzee =

South African artist

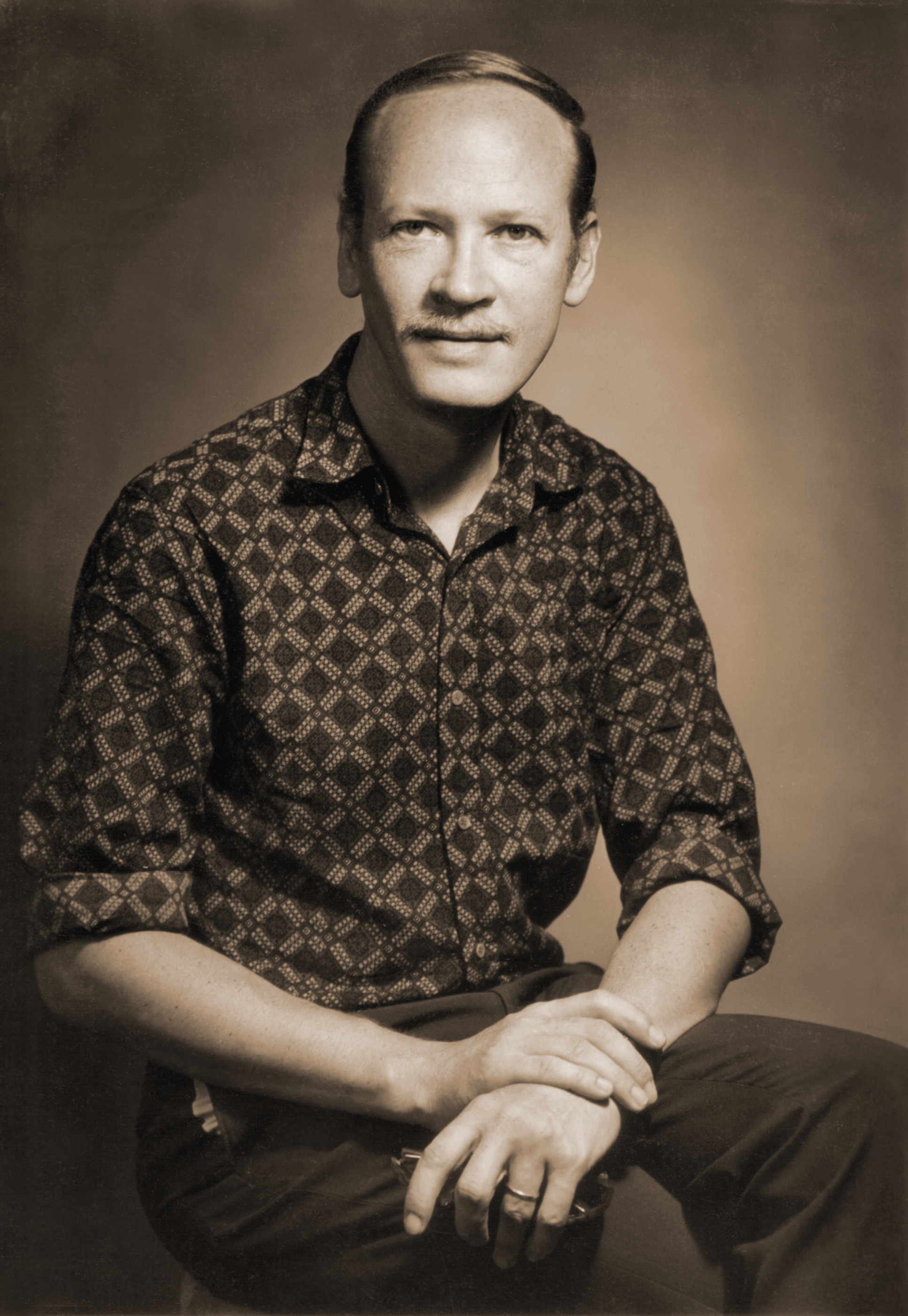
- Christo Coetzee by Dotman Pretorius
- Born: Christo Coetzee; 24 March 1929; Johannesburg; Gauteng, South Africa
- Died: 12 November 2000 (aged 71); Tulbagh; Western Cape, South Africa
- Resting place: 26 Church Street, Tulbagh; Western Cape, South Africa
- Education: University of the Witwatersrand (1947–1959); Slade School of Art (1951–1952)
- Known for: Painting, Collage
- Notable work: Celestial Bicycle (1958); Waterlily Ball (1958); Crespian (1957)
- Movement: Abstract expressionism, Assemblage; Art informel, Neo-Baroque
- Patrons: Anthony Denney, Rodolphe Stadler

Christo Coetzee (24 March 1929 – 12 November 2000) was a South African assemblage and Neo-Baroque artist closely associated with the avant-garde art movements of Europe and Japan during the 1950s and 1960s. Under the influence of art theorist Michel Tapié, art dealer Rodolphe Stadler and art collector and photographer Anthony Denney, as well as the Gutai group of Japan, he developed his oeuvre alongside those of artists strongly influenced by Tapié's Un Art Autre (1952), such as Georges Mathieu, Alfred Wols, Jean Dubuffet, Jean Fautrier, Hans Hartung, Pierre Soulages, Antoni Tàpies and Lucio Fontana.

== Early life and education ==
Christo Coetzee was born on 24 March 1929 at 54 Biccard Street, Turfontein, Johannesburg, to Josef Adriaan Coetzee and Francina Sofia Kruger (1888–1964) (who claimed to be a relation of President Paul Kruger). The family had been farming in the Colesberg district, but were forced by drought and the dilution of income by a large number of sons on the Coetzee family farm, Strydpoort, to seek an income in the rich mining economy of the Witwatersrand some time before Christo's birth. Christo's father developed a lung condition colloquially referred to as miners' phthisis and moved to the building industry, where a talent for drawing became evident. Christo would later attribute his artistic talents to his father and his business acumen to his mother. Christo's father died in 1939 and he was raised by his mother and two sisters, Gertruida (20 years his senior) and Johanna (16 years older).

Christo attended Parkview Primary School and then Parktown Boys' High School, where he became an enthusiastic art student. In the years 1946 to 1950 he attended the University of the Witwatersrand (Wits), where his fellow students were Cecil Skotnes, Esmé Berman, Nel Erasmus, Ruth Allen (Furness), Gordon Vorster, Anna Vorster and Gerda Meyer (Eloff). With Scully, Skotnes, Vorster and Erasmus, he would become part of the so-called Wits group, a loosely knit group better known for their subsequent careers than any coherent aesthetic philosophy.

At Wits Christo designed decor and costumes for drama productions. Influential teachers were Charles Argent, Maria Stein-Lessing, Heather Martienssen, and Marjorie Long, who would become his first wife.

After graduation from Wits with a degree in fine art in 1951, Christo Coetzee had his first solo exhibition in January of that year. This exhibition was opened by South African National Gallery director John Paris, and featured portraits in Victorian daguerreotype style.

== Career and travels ==
=== London, 1951–1955 ===
A Wits scholarship took him to London in 1951 to study at the Slade School of Art under Prof. William Coldstream. The following year, Coetzee and Marjorie Long married in Hammersmith, London and set off to Spain for a honeymoon of several months in the coastal town of Benidorm in Alicante. After her return to South Africa, he spent another six months in London, before returning to Johannesburg at the beginning of 1953.

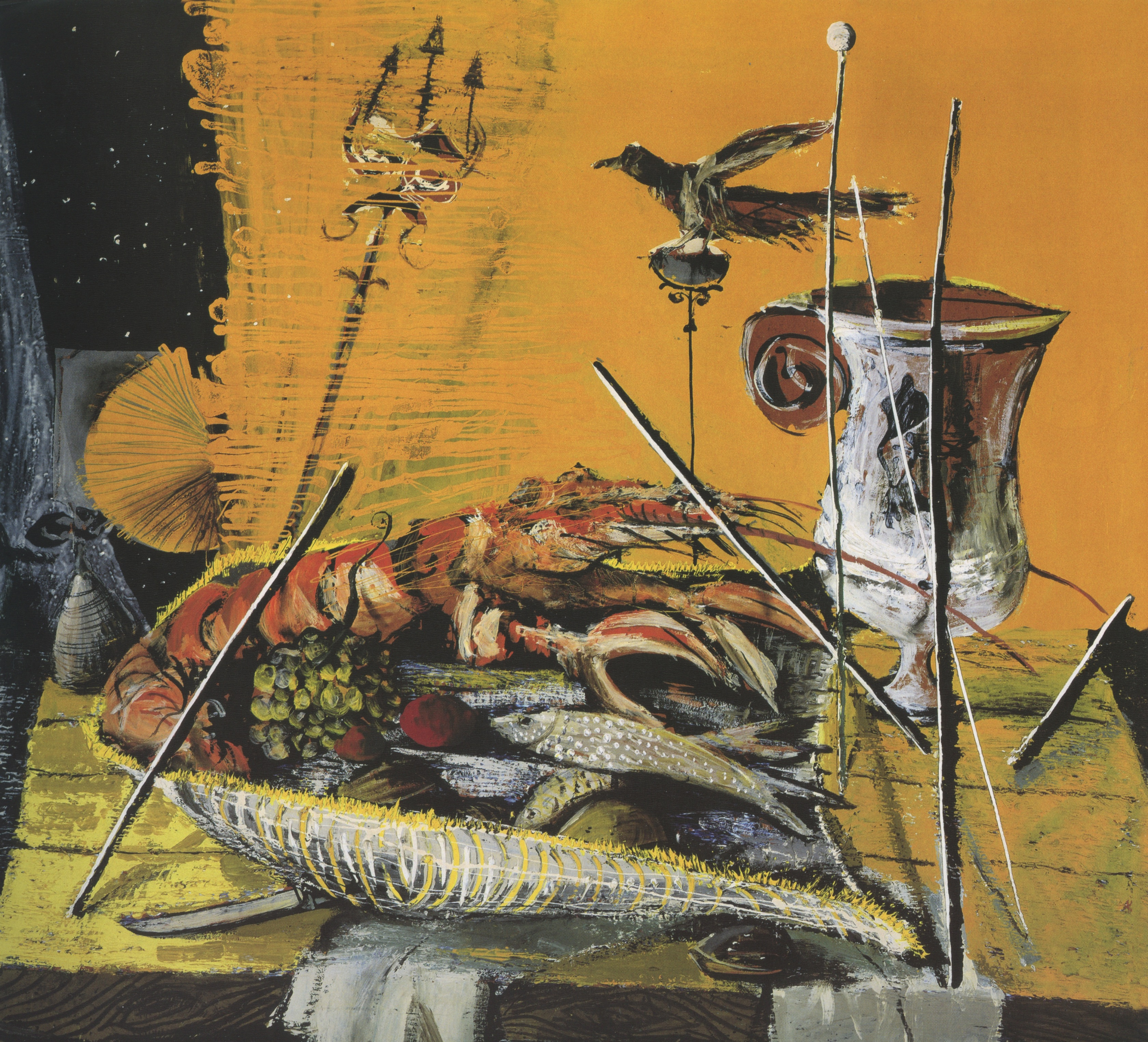
Pompeian Lobster, ca.1954, oil on hardboard, 120 x 120 cm

He was soon occupied with mundane office work, first for the South African Railways, then at Wits, briefly enlivened by an exhibition of small oil paintings at the Lawrence Adler Gallery in Johannesburg. The interest of Cape Town art dealer Louis Schachat was peaked and it became his occupation to acquire Christo's work from this period and the 1951 exhibition. On 6 November 1953, Coetzee was again on his way to London, spurred by a travel lust that would lead to the dissolution of his marriage with Long. She would never again join him abroad.

This time without a sponsor, he took an administrative position at a tobacco company, but found it wanting. He enquired at Gimpel Fils, where Peter and Ernest Gimpel (nephews of Lord Duveen) recommended taking a position at the framing business of Robert Savage, where, indeed, Coetzee found a more rewarding position. It was during this time that he took a painting to Gillian Ayres at the Artists' International Association (AIA), who in turn showed it to photographer and stylist Anthony Denney, who bought the painting immediately for £12.

Denney invited Coetzee to dinner at his home at St Peter's Square 30, Hammersmith, where he found his painting hung above a work by Antoni Clavé. It was the beginning of a lifelong friendship. In 1954 Christo took up a room in Denney's home, paying the rent with paintings. Denney owned about ten works from this period.

Anthony Denney arranged for Coetzee to exhibit at Hanover Gallery in March 1955. The gallery had a reputation for presenting challenging modern artists and alumni included Francis Bacon, Graham Sutherland, Alberto Giacometti, Lucian Freud, William Scott and Henry Moore. This was his first solo exhibition abroad, coincidentally in the same year as Richard Hamilton would have his first solo at the gallery, run at the time by Erica Brausen and supported financially by Max Aitken, son of Lord Beaverbrook. The proceedings were observed by Loelia, Duchess of Westminster.

Coetzee's exhibition consisted of 51 portraits and still life paintings. According to Coetzee, Denney paid £100 for Pompeian lobster and smaller paintings were sold at £50 each. On 26 October 2011, Bonham's, the auction house, sold one of these, Fabergé egg, from the collection of Max Aitken, purchased on his behalf by Le Roux Smith Le Roux, for £13,750 (inclusive of buyer's premium). Other buyers were Sandy and Bunny Roger, who purchased two works (sold by Sotheby's in 1998), and Elizabeth David.

=== Italy, January 1956 – April 1956 ===
In 1956 Coetzee and Australian Sidney Nolan received a bursary from the Italian government, through mediation of the British Council, for a four-month sojourn in Italy. With an introductory letter from Erica Brausen to Pavel Tchelitchew, he set off to Frascati in January of that year. He met Alberto Burri in Rome, visited the Rome Quadriennale, and arranged the purchase of Burri's Tutto Nero for Anthony Denney's collection. Later, in pilgrimage, he visited Peggy Guggenheim at her home in Venice and remembered vividly the glass and metal gate of American artist Claire Falkenstein.

=== Paris, 1956–1959 ===
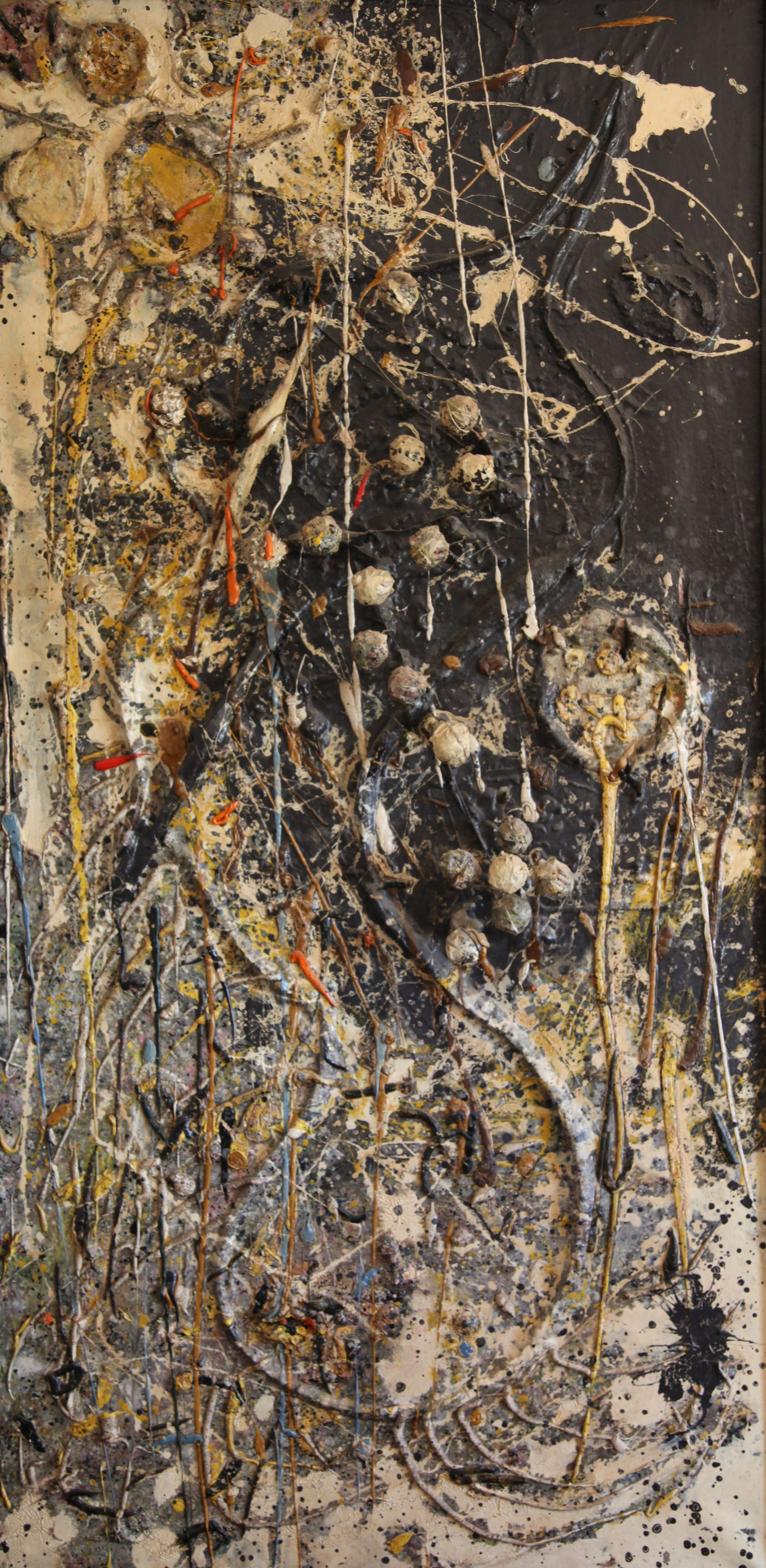
Painting Yellow, 1957, oil on assemblage, 182 x 91 x 11 cm, Jan du Toit Collection

French tachist Georges Mathieu had visited Anthony Denney in London, and noticing one of Coetzee's paintings, extended an invitation for the artist to come to Paris and visit the Galerie Rive Droite to meet owner Jean la Carde. On Coetzee's arrival in Paris, he met Mathieu and was introduced by him to Michel Tapié de Céleyran. Tapié would bring the influence of art informel to bear on Coetzee's work.

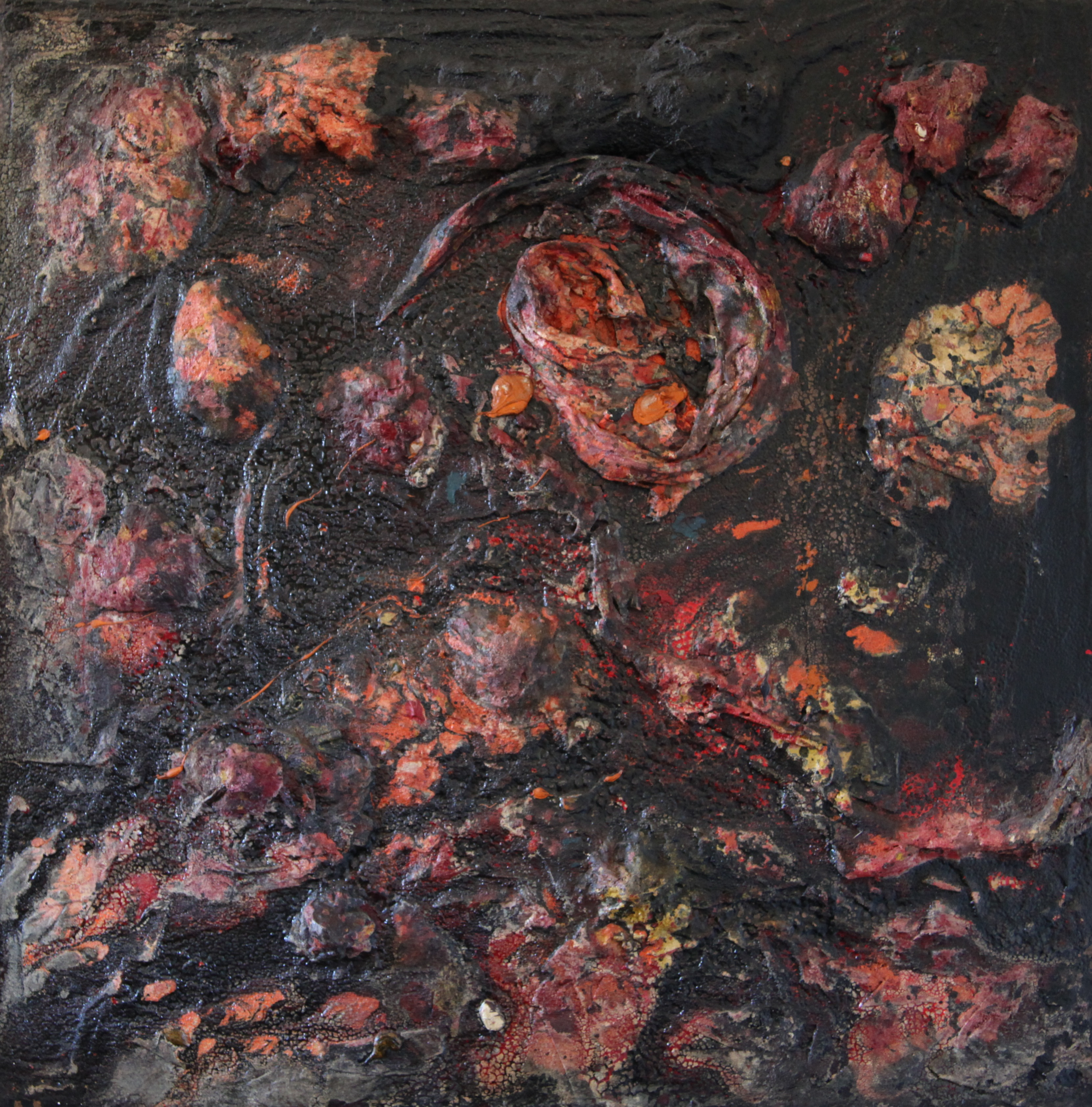
Untitled, 1957, oil on canvas, Jan du Toit Collection

Jean la Carde soon decided to marry and close the gallery. With encouragement from Denney and Tapié, Coetzee moved to the new Galerie Stadler, which had been established by Rodolphe Stadler at 51 Rue de Seine a year earlier. The gallery offered a stipend to its artists, who were required to supply paintings for regular exhibitions. Coetzee established his studio at 4 Rue de l'Hotel Colbert, in a cellar room, and stayed at 5 Rue de Lille, in the attic, both in the 7th arrondissement on the Left Bank.

In 1958, Coetzee's Crespian (1957), an assemblage painting, is included in the Pittsburgh International Exhibition of Contemporary Painting and Sculpture, along with artists such as Joan Mitchell, Conrad Marca-Relli, Édgar Negret, Maurice Wyckaert, Nassos Daphnis, Ellsworth Kelly, Alexander Calder and Richard Diebenkorn.

Coetzee became an attendee at the Thursday salon of Marie-Louise Bousquet, wife of dramatist Jacques Bousquet and Harper's Bazaar's editor in Paris for 50 years. Here Coetzee met Dutch painter Karel Appel, Annabel Buffett, wife and muse of Bernard Buffet and gallerist Charles Vessey.

Coetzee found an important friend in the person of Aileen Hennessy, the cognac heiress, who had an apartment at 1 rue Gît-le-Cœur in the 6th arrondissement, only 7 minutes walk from his studio. Aileen was a painter who accompanied Coetzee to galleries and invited him to the gatherings she hosted in her apartment on the Seine. Typical attendees would have been Aileen's sister Scheilagh and Alice DeLamar, heiress to the fortune of Joseph Raphael De Lamar, who had an apartment in the same building. In later years Aileen's brother, Francis Hennessy, would visit Coetzee in Tulbagh, South Africa.

On 17 March 1959, Coetzee joined Lucio Fontana in exhibiting his work at Galerie Stadler. On this occasion Solange de Noailles, Duchesse d'Ayen, fashion editor of French Vogue, hosted a lunch with several future collectors of his work. The group included architect and interior decorator Victor Grandpierre, Marie-Hélène de Rothschild and Tom Kernan, editor of Maison & Jardin.

=== Japan, February 1959 – March 1960 ===
Coetzee was awarded a Japanese government bursary for two years of study in Osaka and Tokyo, through mediation done by the British Council. The financial support was paid entirely in 1959. Francis King, later to become a respected writer, worked for the British Council in Kyoto and was Coetzee's liaison.

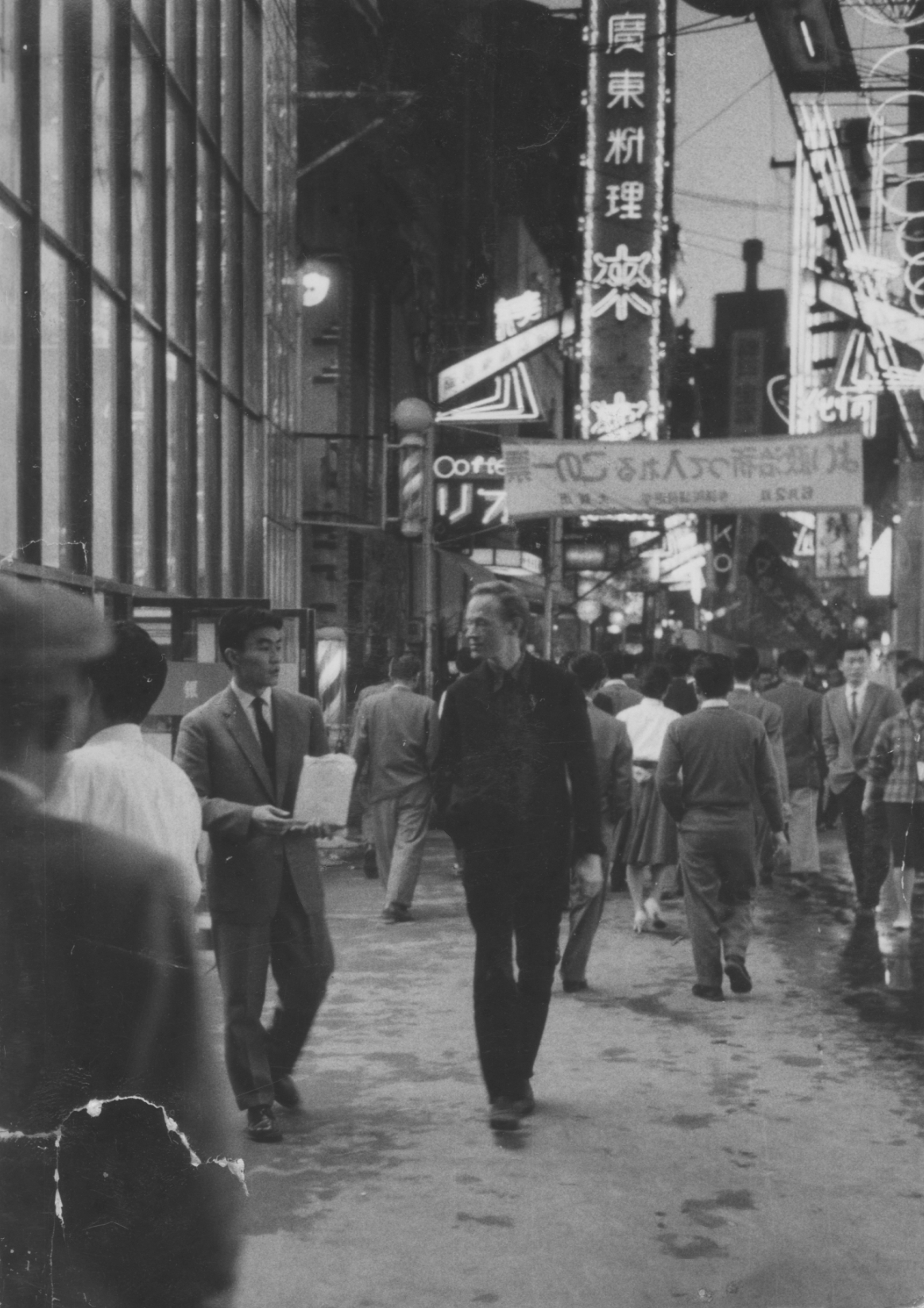
Christo Coetzee (right) and Michio Yoshihara, Osaka (1959)

After his arrival in February 1959, he was quickly referred to the Gutai group of artists by professor J. Ijimi of Kyoto University. Coetzee had gained some knowledge of the group from Michel Tapié and soon met founder Jiro Yoshihara and his son Michio Yoshihara. He would spend 11 months working with these important Japanese artists.

Coetzee also made frequent trips to Tokyo, even taking a studio there. This work culminated in an exhibition of Informel works at the Minami Gallery, Tokyo in October 1959. In Tokyo he also met artist Takako Idemitsu and her husband Tono, an art critic.

The Gutai group invited him to exhibit at the Takashimaya Gallery in Osaka in 1960. He did so from 20 to 24 January 1960, with an introduction by Francis King. In 1976, Coetzee donated eleven Gutai paintings, along with a Gutai Pinacotheca publication, to the University of Johannesburg.

One of Coetzee's paintings from this period Butterfly lighting in a diamond (1960) was purchased from the Stadler Gallery by Philip Johnson for $1000, and sent straight to the MOMA for the 1961 The art of assemblage show comprising 140 artists, including Braque, Dubuffet, Marcel Duchamp, Picasso, and Kurt Schwitters alongside Americans Man Ray, Joseph Cornell and Robert Rauschenberg. Coetzee would visit Johnson at his famous Glass House in New Canaan, Connecticut in 1962.

Coetzee left Japan in March 1960 for a solo exhibition at the Swertzoff Gallery in Boston, who also represented assemblage artist Bruce Conner, then a group exhibition at the Martha Jackson Gallery at 32 East 69th Street, New York. The two part show New Media, New Forms and New Media-New Forms: Version II ran from 6 to 24 June 1960 and from 28 September to 22 October 1960 respectively. Version I, of which Coetzee was a part, also featured Antoni Tàpies, Jean Arp, Alberto Burri, Alexander Calder, John Chamberlain, Joseph Cornell, Jim Dine, Jean Dubuffet, Dan Flavin, Jasper Johns, Allan Kaprow, Yves Klein, Louise Nevelson, Claes Oldenburg and Robert Rauschenberg.

=== Paris, 1961–1965 ===
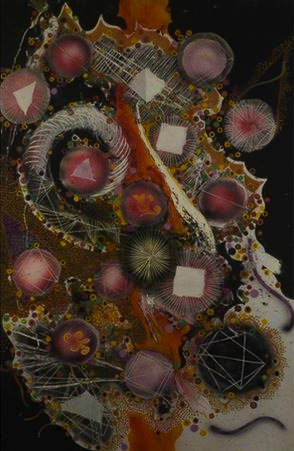
Et in Arcadia Ego, 1964, 195 x 130 cm, oil on canvas

Christo Coetzee's first solo show at Galerie Stadler opened at the end of January 1961 and, in April 1961, solo shows are held at the Lawrence Adler Gallery, Johannesburg and the Galerie d'Arte del Naviglio, Milan. Around this time Anthony Denney and partner Alex Collins won a commission from shipping magnate Basil Mavroleon to design the interior of his yacht Radiant II.

In the same year, while on his way to a reception by Rosamond Bernier, art historian an co-founding editor of the magazine L'Oeil, he became stuck in an elevator with designer Elsa Schiaparelli. They struck up a conversation became friends and Schiaparelli commissioned a painting to promote her perfume S. The painting was later given pride of place, above the stairs, at her home at 22 Rue de Berri in the eight arrondissement of Paris.

In 1962, Coetzee's Celestial Doors (1961), a diptych executed on the frames of two aluminium doors, was exhibited at the exhibition Antagonismes 2 : L'Objet, Musée des Arts Décoratifs, Palais du Louvre, Paris, 7 March – April 1962, curated by François Mathey, and including works by artist like Yves Klein and Dorothea Tanning.

Also in 1962, Coetzee received a studio visit by Danie van Niekerk of the Rembrandt Group to commission a work for Turmac Tobacco Company in Zevenaar, Netherlands. This collection had been started in 1960 by Alexander Orlow and employed respected advisors to guide acquisitions. At the time of the Coetzee acquisition Stedelijk Museum director Willem Sandberg was the acquisitions advisor. The collection would be named the Peter Stuyvesant Collection, and, in 1994 renamed the BAT Artventure Collection.

A second solo exhibition of Neo-Baroque works was held from 22 October to 18 November 1963 at Galerie Stadler. The introduction to the exhibition was again provided by Michel Tapié de Céleyran and photographs show Anthony Denney, Duchesse d'Ayen and Aileen Hennessy in attendance.

=== Finestrat, Spain and Tulbagh, South Africa ===
In 1965, Coetzee was forced to abandon his studio at Rue de l'Hotel Colbert due to plans to restore the building. His friend Anthony Denney had owned a finca (an estate) close to the mountain town of Finestrat in Spain. As early as 1956 Denney and Coetzee had visited Salvador and Gala Dalí at Port Lligat on the Cap de Creus peninsula. Faced with the loss of his studio, Coetzee purchased a house in Finestrat, Spain and settled there. While living in Spain he became friends with Imme Reich and Frederico Van Ankum and exhibited at their Galeria Arrabal in Callosa d'En Sarrià.

He also spent significantly more time in his home country, as is evidenced by more frequent exhibitions. During a short visit to South African, it was decided to show a retrospective exhibition of his work at the Pretoria Art Museum from December 1965 to January 1966, curated by Albert Werth. A total of 77 examples of his work, spanning 17 years were exhibited.

In May 1966 Coetzee's friend Ludwig Binge died of heart disease in Pretoria. Coetzee invited his widow, Ferrie Binge, to visit him in Spain the next year. Anthony Denney extended the same invitation. She undertook a visit in June 1967, and they were eventually married in Gibraltar on 5 March 1968. Hereafter he would divide his time between Spain and South Africa. In October of that year his work was exhibited in the Cape for the first time in 17 years, at Stellenbosch.

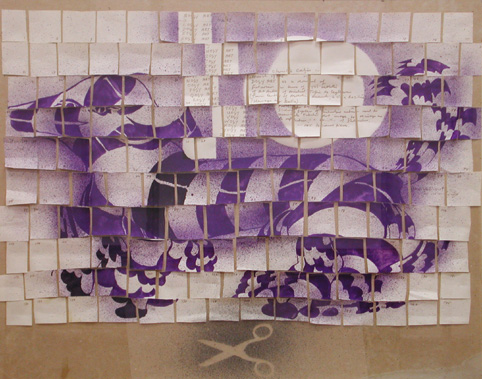
Homage to Balla, 1975, 67 x 79 cm, gouache on paper

In 1975 Christo Coetzee entered a new period in his career, later referred to as a Protest Phase or hermetic phase by some reviewers. In January 1975 a solo exhibition of his work opened at the gallery of the former South African Association of Arts (Western Cape). The following afternoon, Coetzee returned to the gallery and cut twenty-three paintings to shreds. The act had been precipitated by a poor review of his exhibition and a news report on the artist Christo, with whose work Coetzee had been familiar with when he was in Europe. On 7 February 1975, Coetzee gave a lecture on the act at the South African Association of Arts, Cape Town, situating his destructive act in the context of work he had done in the 1950s and calling it a Gutai act. In May 1975, many of the cut paintings were exhibited at the Rand Afrikaans University's (now University of Johannesburg) Gencor Gallery. Coetzee again presented a public lecture on the processes involved in his work.

The day following the opening night at the former South African Association of Arts (Northern Transvaal) in Pretoria in 1978, Coetzee blocked out works with black paint, but was persuaded to cover some works with black plastic sheeting to preserve the originals. Again, at the opening night of an exhibition by Ferrie Binge-Coetzee's works in Potchefstroom in 1983, Coetzee bought a painting, cut it up and distributed it to the audience, after which he persuaded the audience to eat the work. It was an oblique reference to Daniel Spoerri's Eat Art as a form of artistic protest.

== Later years and legacy ==
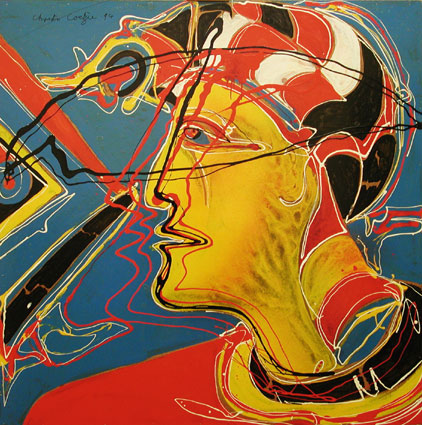
The Perfect One, 1994, 122 x 122 cm, oil on panel

Christo Coetzee was awarded the South African Academy for Science and Arts Medal of Honour for 1983. The same year a commemorative exhibition was held by the University of Potchefstroom, along with a retrospective at the Pretoria Art Museum. An exhibition of his work at the Taipei Fine Arts Museum was held in Taiwan in 1985. In 1999 a major retrospective was held in Stellenbosch, South Africa.

The artist succumbed to colorectal cancer on 12 November 2000 in Tulbagh, South Africa. Coetzee's house, a National Monument dating from 1796, was restored, along with the barn he used as a studio, and opened as the Christo Coetzee House Museum and Gallery in August 2011. Coetzee's collection of some 2600 objects d′art were donated to the University of Pretoria Art Collection, which are in the possession of 193 artworks by the artist.

== Career exhibitions ==
- Standard Bank, The Safest Place is the Knife's Edge, 2018
- University of Pretoria, Retrospective, 2010
- Sasol Kunsmuseum, Stellenbosch, Christo Coetzee 70, 17 April 1999 – 27 June 1999
- Taipei Fine Arts Museum, Taiwan, Exhibition of Post-modern paintings by Christo Coetzee, 5 October 1985 – 20 October 1985
- Pretoria Art Museum, Pretoria, Retrospective Exhibition (1965-1983), 1983
- Potchefstroom University for CHE, Potchefstroom, Commemorative Exhibition, 1983
- South African Association of Arts (Northern Transvaal), Pretoria, 1978
- South African Association of Arts (Western Cape), Cape Town, January 1975
- Galerie Connoisseur, Northcliff, Johannesburg, 1 February 1973 – 15 February 1973
- Goodman Gallery, Johannesburg, April 1971
- Goodman Gallery, Johannesburg, February 1969
- Pretoria Art Museum, Christo Coetzee, 1 December 1965 to 2 January 1966
- Galerie Stadler, Paris, Peintures de Coetzee, 22 October 1963 – 18 November 1963
- Museum of Modern Art, New York, The Art of Assemblage, 1961
- Galerie Stadler, Paris, Coetzee, 24 January to 20 February 1961
- Takashimaya Gallery, Osaka, Coetzee: Exhibition presented by the Gutai Art Association, January 1960
- Minami Gallery, Tokyo, October 1959
- Galerie Stadler, Paris, Christo Coetzee, 17 March 1959
- Pittsburgh International Exhibition of Contemporary Painting and Sculpture, Pittsburgh, Pennsylvania, 5 December 1958 to 8 February 1959
- Hanover Gallery, London, Christo Coetzee, 17 March to 15 April 1955
- ID Booksellers, Cape Town, Christo Coetzee, January 1951

== Major collections ==
Christo Coetzee's works are included in a number of collections:

=== International ===
- Beaverbrook Art Gallery, New Brunswick, Canada
- Collection of Anthony Denney, Musee d'Art Moderne, Toulouse, France
- International Centre for Aesthetic Research, Turin, Italy
- Taipei Fine Arts Museum, Taiwan
- Idemitsu Collection, Tokyo, Japan
- Peter Stuyvesant Collection, Amsterdam
- Turmac Collection, Zeevenaar, Netherlands
- Schlesinger Art Collection, Italy

=== South African Museums ===
- South African National Gallery, Cape Town
- Johannesburg Art Gallery, Johannesburg
- Pretoria Art Museum, Pretoria
- William Humphreys Art Gallery, Kimberley
- Hester Rupert Art Museum, Graaff Reinet
- Potchefstroom Museum, Potchefstroom
- Roodepoort Museum, Roodepoort
- Oliewenhuis Art Museum, Bloemfontein

=== South African University Collections ===
- North-West University, Potchefstroom
- Stellenbosch University, Stellenbosch
- University of Pretoria, Pretoria
- University of South Africa, Pretoria
- University of Johannesburg, Johannesburg
- University of the Witwatersrand, Johannesburg
- University of Cape Town, Cape Town

=== Corporate and Other Collections ===
- State Theatre, Pretoria
- OR Tambo International Airport, Johannesburg
- CSIR, Pretoria
- Volkskas Art Collection, Pretoria, now the ABSA Art Collection
- Sasol Corporate Art Collection, Johannesburg
- Sanlam Art Collection, Cape Town
- Rembrandt van Rijn Art Foundation
- Polokwane Art Gallery, Polokwane
- Sandton Municipality Collection, Johannesburg
- Schlesinger Art Collection, Johannesburg
