= Adolph Jentsch =

German-born Namibian painter

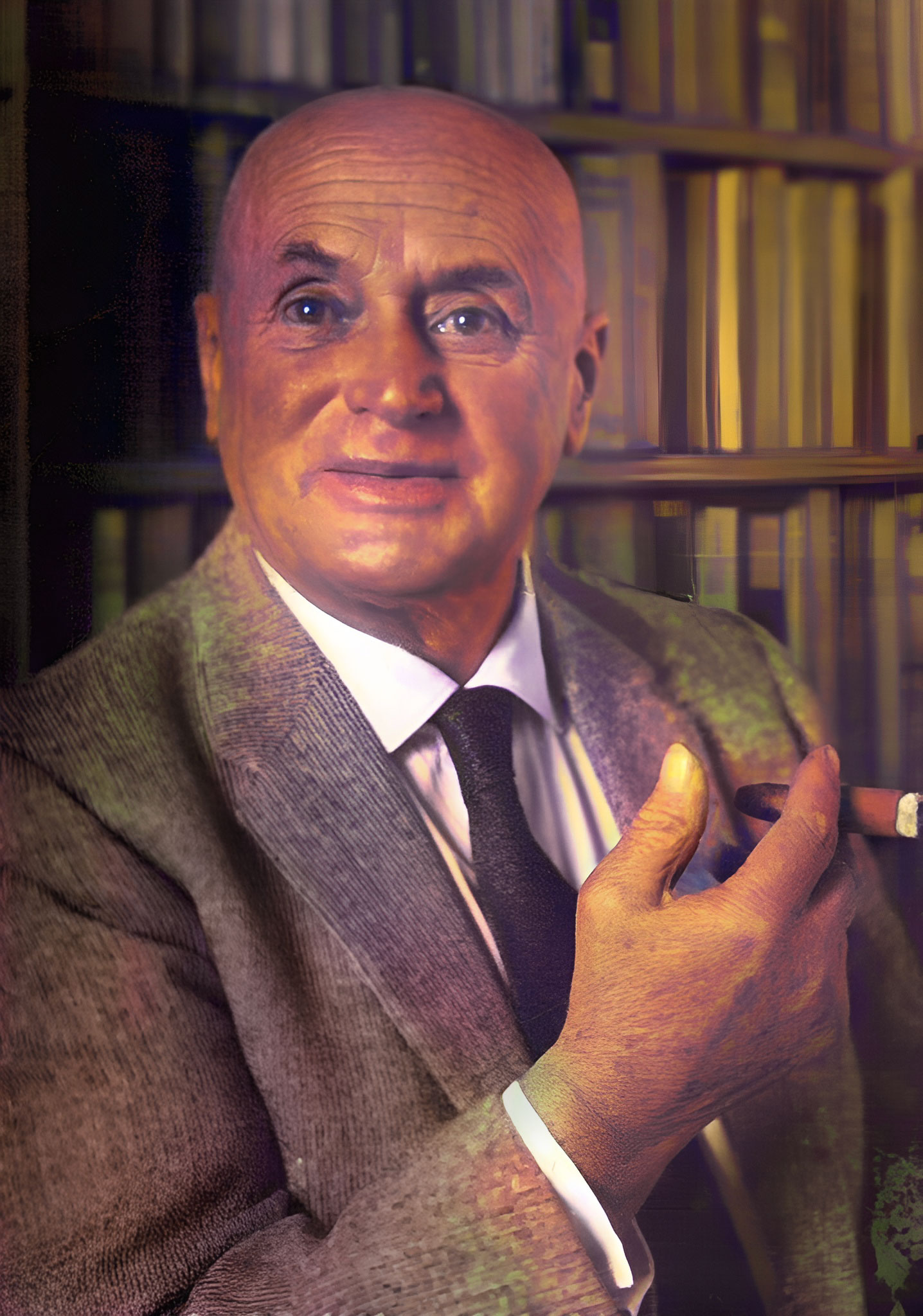
- Adolph Jentsch circa 1960
- Born: Adolph Stephan Friedrich Jentsch; December 29, 1888; Deubell, Dresden
- Died: 18 April 1977 (aged 88); Windhoek, Namibia
- Resting place: Grave #1536, Gammams Cemetery, Windhoek, Namibia; 22.5823°S 17.0708°E
- Education: Dresden Art Academy
- Awards: 1913 Königlich~Sächsische Staatsmedaille fur Kunst und Wissenschaft 1958 Order of Merit, First Class, Federal Republic of Germany 1962 Medal of Honour for Painting, S.A. Akademie vir Kuns en Wetenskap

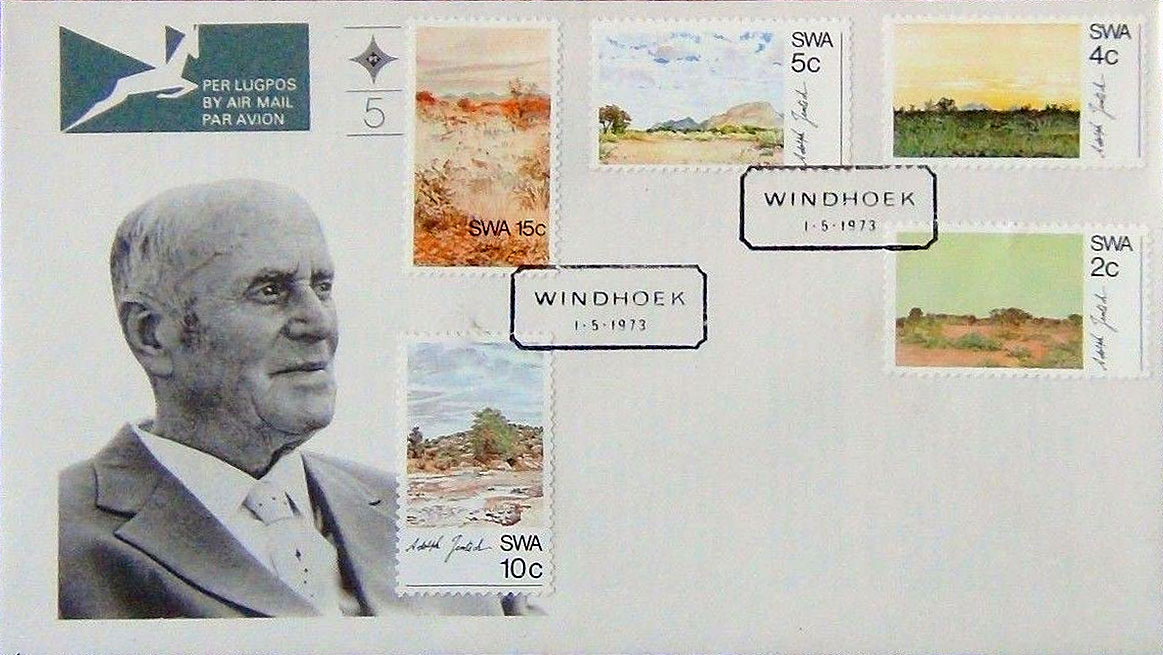
1973 commemorative stamps of the issue "Paintings"

Adolph Stephan Friedrich Jentsch (29 December 1888 Dresden – 18 April 1977 Windhoek) was a German-born Namibian artist. He studied at the Dresden Staatsakademie für Bildende Künste (Dresden Art Academy, today's College of Fine Arts) for six years, and used a travel grant award to visit France, Italy, UK and the Netherlands. Jentsch moved to Namibia in 1938 to escape the approaching war and lived there until his death. He travelled extensively in Namibia and eventually settled down near Dordabis, about 60 km from the capital Windhoek. He is one of Namibia's most famous painters.

== Life and career ==
=== Germany ===
Jentsch was the son of a Lutheran church official, Stephan Jentsch, and his wife Adele Rosenthal. He attended the gymnasium of the Brudergemeine Zinzendorf, at Nieski. Six years of further education followed at Dresden's Staatsakademie fϋr Bildende Künste. Other student artists at the academy were Max Pechstein, George Grosz and Kurt Schwitters. He was awarded the Königlich-Sächsische Staatsmedaille fur Kunst und Wissenschaft and several travel grants. Later, Jentsch often worked for Otto Gussmann, decorating public buildings.

Jentsch was in the Jäger-Reserve in the First World War, but developed a crippling rheumatism that put him into a military hospital at Neustadt for a year. After the war, he married a young divorcee, Anne Ilgen, in 1920, and together they operated a small factory making spray-containers for perfume. Anne ran the factory while Jentsch painted. A son, Christoph, was born in 1921.

Jentsch illustrated a children's book in 1927, and joined a group of interior decorators in Czechoslovakia. He worked on colour schemes and decorative painting on jobs in Germany and Czechoslovakia.

=== Namibia ===
Jentsch's antipathy to National Socialism resulted in a loss of commissions, so he took up an offer to vacation on the farm Kleepforte, near Windhoek in Namibia (then called South West Africa) owned by his friend, Helmuth Dietterle (1901–2002). He arrived in Africa in early 1938, and never left, working in oils and watercolour until his death in 1977.

Jentsch painted landscapes almost exclusively, working in watercolour and oil. He was interested in Oriental philosophy, specifically Taoism, and was influenced by Chinese Art. He travelled extensively in Namibia, staying at many farms and painting the diverse landscapes, but in 1947 he finally settled on a farm near Dordabis called Brack, about 60 km from Windhoek, with his friends Gebhard and Dorothee von Funcke.

Jentsch found the Namibian landscape amenable to his mystical approach to art. His watercolours display the same calligraphic strokes seen in Chinese art. In 1960 Jentsch abandoned oils and worked only in watercolour.

=== Later life ===
Five of his paintings were reproduced as stamps in 1973 – the first non-commemorative stamps in South African philatelic history.

In the early 1970s he suffered a stroke that left him with a tremor that stopped him painting completely. His last painting was painted in 1974. After the death of Gebhard von Funcke in July 1974 at age 75, Jentsch and Dorothea von Funcke, with whom he had a formal friendship only, moved into a modest house in Windhoek West (26 Bach Street) for the final few years of his life.

In 1975, farm workers at Brack, attempting to smoke out a wasp's nest, started a fire in the rafters of the old barn where Jentsch stored much of his oeuvre in an upright metal filing cabinet. The barn caught fire and burned down, with the result that a large number of his works was lost. His friend, architect Peter Strack, estimated —based on the numbering system that Jentsch used— that Jentsch had painted approximately 6,000 paintings during his lifetime, and that approximately 3,000 (mostly watercolours) were destroyed in the blaze.

Four of Jentsch's watercolours were reproduced in limited editions by his biographer Olga Levinson's son, Orde, in 1975.

Jentsch died of pneumonia in the Windhoek State Hospital on 18 April 1977 at age 88. His longtime friend Dorothea died May 24, 1984 (aged 88).

== Awards ==
- 1913 Königlich-Sächsische Staatsmedaille für Kunst und Wissenschaft.
- 1958 Order of Merit, First Class, Federal Republic of West Germany.
- 1962 Medal of Honour for Painting, SA Akademie vir Wetenskap en Kuns.

== Public collections ==
- Administration of South West Africa
- Hester Rupert Art Museum, Graaf-Reinet
- Iziko South African National Gallery, Cape Town
- Johannesburg Art Gallery
- King George VI Gallery, Port Elizabeth
- Pietersburg Collection
- Pretoria Art Museum
- Pretoria University
- Rand Afrikaans University, Johannesburg
- Rembrandt van Rijn Art Foundation
- S.A Association of Arts, Windhoek
- State Museum, Windhoek
- UNISA
- University of Stellenbosch
- William Humphreys Gallery, Kimberley.
- (in German) Adolph Jentsch. In: Allgemeines Künstlerlexikon. Die Bildenden Künstler aller Zeiten und Völker (AKL). Band 77, de Gruyter, Berlin 2013, ISBN 978-3-11-023182-3, S. 535

== Art exhibitions ==
- 1938 : Adolph Jentsch's first one-man exhibition in Southern Africa, Windhoek.
- 1954 : Venice Biennale
- 1956 : First Quad of South African Art
- 1958 : Retrospective Exhibition, Windhoek (70th Birthday); South African Exhibition touring Holland, Germany and Belgium.
- 1960 : Second Quad of South African Art.
- 1962 : “South West African Artists’, South African National Art Gallery, Cape Town.
- 1964 : Third Quad of South African Art.
- 1966 : Republic Fest Exhibition, Pretoria.
- 1967 : Prestige Exhibition, Johannesburg Art Gallery
- 1968 : Retrospective Exhibition, SAAA, Windhoek (80th Birthday)
- 1970/1 : Prestige Exhibition, Pretoria Art Museum
- 1974 : Retrospective Exhibition, SAAA, Windhoek

== Publications ==
- Adolph Jentsch. Die Bilder aus der Zigarrenkiste. 2003, by Peter Strack
- Gallery Magazine, Autumn 1984, Adolph Jentsch — Prayers in Paint by Mark A. Meaker
- Adolph Jentsch. 1973, by Olga Levinson (biography)
- Lantern, Vol.3, No.4, April–June, 1954: 'Adolph Jentsch' by Prof. Otto Schröder
- Lantern, Vol.7, No.1, October, 1957: 'Vyf Kunstenaars uit Suidwes-Afrika'
- Adolph Jentsch, SWA.: An appreciation with reproductions of watercolours painted by Jentsch in the surroundings of Brack. Essays by Prof. Otto Schröder and Petrus Anton Hendriks, Swakopmund, 1958 (70th anniversary)
- Our Art, Vol.1: Essay by Prof. Otto Schröder, 1959
- Fontein, Vol.1, No.1, 1960: 'Adolph Jentsch' by Petrus Anton Hendriks
- Art in South Africa by F. L. Alexander, Cape Town, 1962
- South West Africa Annual, 1970: 'Jentsch' by Olga Levinson
- Art and artists of South Africa by Esmé Berman, Cape Town, 1970

== Film ==
- Jentsch, documentary sound film, 16mm, commissioned by The Friends of the South African National Gallery, Cape Town, 1970. Written and produced by Olga Levinson; filmed by Lewis-Lewis Productions.
