= John Gregson (disambiguation) =

John Gregson (1919–1975) was an English actor

John Gregson may also refer to:

- John Gregson (politician) (1821–1867), member of the Tasmanian House of Assembly and the Tasmanian Legislative Council
- John Gregson, Baron Gregson (1924–2009), British politician, member of the Labour Party
- John Gregson (sailor) (1924–2016), British George Cross recipient
- John Gregson (footballer) (born 1939), English winger who played from the mid 1950s to 1971

== See also ==
- John Grigson (1893–1943), British pilot and air commodore
