= Lord Ryder =

Lord Ryder could refer to:

- Richard Ryder, Baron Ryder of Wensum (born 1949), a British politician
- Don Ryder, Baron Ryder of Eaton Hastings, (1913–2003), a British businessman
