= Arthur Knight (businessman) =

British business executive

Sir Arthur William Knight (29 March 1917 – 5 April 2003) was a British businessman who became chairman of Courtaulds.

== Career ==
Educated at Tottenham County School and the London School of Economics, Knight saw action with the Special Operations Executive in North Africa during the Second World War. After service with the Control Commission for Austria he joined Courtaulds where he became finance director in 1961, deputy chairman in 1970 and chairman in 1975.

After retiring from Courtaulds he became Chairman of the National Enterprise Board in 1979 but, after finding himself undermined by ministers and by other board members, he resigned in November 1980. He was knighted in the 1975 Birthday Honours and died in April 2003.

== Family ==
In 1945, he married Joan Osborne (née Oppenheim); they had a son and three daughters. After the death of his first wife, he married Sheila Whiteman in 1972.
