= Edward Singleton =

British Lawyer

Sir Edward Henry Sibbald Singleton (7 April 1921 – 6 September 1992) was a British lawyer who was president of the Law Society of England and Wales.

He was educated at Shrewsbury School and Brasenose College, Oxford and was articled with the firm of Messrs Sharpe, Pritchard & Co. During the Second World War he served as a pilot in the Fleet Air Arm in the Western Desert, the Mediterranean and the Pacific.

After the war he qualified as a solicitor in 1949 and served five years with Richards Butler & Co. before moving on in 1954 as a partner in the firm of Macfarlanes. He was a consultant from 1977 to 1986.

He was a member of the council of the Law Society from 1961 to 1980, serving as their vice-president in 1973 and their president in 1974, for which he was knighted in the 1975 Birthday Honours.

He died in 1992. He had married in 1943 Margaret Hutton, with whom he had three sons and a daughter.
