= Nel Erasmus =

South African artist

Nel Erasmus (born 1928 in Bethal, Transvaal, South Africa) is a South African artist. Erasmus's paintings feature bright colors and dynamic forms.

== Early life and education ==
Erasmus spent time in Paris in the early 1950s with other South Africans (Christo Coetzee, Paul du Toit, and Eric Loubser). In the 1950s, he studied at:

- 1950, University of the Witwatersrand, BA in Fine Arts (under Joyce Leonard and Heather Martienssen, with Christo Coetzee, Gordon Vorster, Cecil Skotnes, and Larry Scully)
- 1952, National Arts Teacher’s Certificate, Wits Technikon
- 1952, private study under Gina Berndtson
- 1953–1955, Sorbonne, Ecole des Beaux Arts, and Académie Ranson, Paris (under Gustave Singier, Selim Turan, and Marcel Fiorini)

Erasmus studied at the Académie Ranson, École des Beaux Arts, and Sorbonne in Paris in 1953 and exhibited her works, for the first time, in Paris in 1955. Her first solo exhibition was held in South Africa in 1957. She has produced 30 solo exhibitions and 90 group exhibitions.

== Career ==
Nel Erasmus worked at the Johannesburg Art Gallery from 1957 and was the director from 1966 until her retirement in 1977. She contributed to the acquisition of artworks for public and corporate (especially Sanlam and Sasol) collections in South Africa, in particular the international modern and contemporary collection at the Johannesburg Art Gallery.

Erasmus's acquisition in 1973, the year Picasso died, of Pablo Picasso's Tête d’Arlequin (1971), was funded by the Friends of the Museum organization. The acquisition of this painting of a clown was met with resistance, leading to Erasmus writing a paper defending the decision. Erasmus explained that it was the policy of other art museums in South Africa to make collections of South African art, but JAG had a policy to focus on international art.

== Awards ==
- 1991 Helgaard Steyn Award for Best South African Painting for Jazz Baby/Spent Autumn

== Selected exhibitions ==
- 1955 Galerie Bogroff, Paris
- 1955 10th Salon des Réalités Nouvelles in the Musée d'Art Moderne de Paris
- 1957 Henri Lidchi Art Gallery, Johannesburg (first solo exhibition)
- 1965 Biennale de Paris
- 1965 São Paulo Biennale, São Paulo
- 1982–1991 Cassirer Fine Art Gallery, Johannesburg

== Selected works ==
- Iziko South African National Gallery, Cape Town – Sketch for the Great Cellist (1963), The Great Cellist (1963)
- Johannesburg Art Gallery, Johannesburg – Whirlpool in a Human Matrix (1974)
- Oliewenhuis Art Museum, Bloemfontein – Jazz Baby/Spent Autumn (1991)
- Pretoria Art Museum, Pretoria – Space Dance No. 5 (1984); Bold Swimmer (1986)
- Sanlam Art Collection – 6th Day of Creation (1995)
