= Ryder Report (British Leyland) =

The Ryder Report was the official report produced for the Government of the United Kingdom in 1975 by Sir Don Ryder, newly appointed head of the UK's National Enterprise Board who was given the task of reporting on the British Leyland Motor Corporation (BLMC) and listing recommendations for its future.

The report, titled "British Leyland: The Next Decade", was prepared by a team that included Bob Clark (Chairman of Hill Samuel), Fred MacWhirter (a senior partner of Peats) and Sam Gillen (the ex-head of Ford UK and Ford of Europe). It was passed to Tony Benn, Secretary of State for Industry, on 26 March 1975 only 14 weeks after commission.

According to AROnline, "[i]n brief, the report made the following recommendations:

- Donald Stokes should resign as company Chairman.
- The grotty factory machinery should be replaced and as a matter of highest urgency.
- A cohesive model strategy needed to be devised, cutting out the immense overlap in the company’s range.
- The company should build a new test and development centre in order to facilitate more efficient development of new cars.
- Industrial relations problems should be eradicated."

The report recommended capital expenditure of £1,264 million ("£2,090 million in inflated price terms" "over the eight years to end September 1982") from the government, backed up with a working capital of £260 million ("£750 million in inflated price terms"). If this was not taken it would be seen that the government had allowed the UK's leading car company to collapse and fail – a result that could have led to around one million people being put out of work.

A result of adopting the report was the part-nationalisation of BLMC as the government bought shares in the company, until it became the majority shareholder. The company known largely just as "BL" would continue.
