= John Russell (art critic) =

English art critic and journalist (1919–2008)

John Russell CBE (22 January 1919 – 23 August 2008) was an English art critic and journalist.

He is not to be confused with John Russell Taylor (19 June 1935 – 18 August 2025), also an English critic and author, on film, art and theatre.

== Life and career ==
John Russell was born in Fleet, Hampshire, England, in 1919. He attended St Paul's School and then Magdalen College, Oxford.

He was an unpaid intern at the Tate Gallery in 1940, but moved to the country after the gallery was bombed. During World War II he worked in Naval Intelligence for the Admiralty. There he met Ian Fleming, who helped to secure Russell a reviewing position at The Sunday Times. Russell succeeded a fired critic at The Sunday Times in 1950.

Art critic Hilton Kramer of The New York Times hired Russell in 1974. Russell was chief art critic there from 1982 to 1990.

== Marriages ==
Russell was married to:

- Alexandrina, Countess Apponyi de Nagy-Appony, the former wife of Julius Lanczy. They married in 1945, divorced in 1951, and had one child, Lavinia (married Sir Nicholas Grimshaw).
- Vera Poliakoff (died 1992), married 1956, divorced 1971. Also known professionally as Vera Lindsay, she was an artist and actress, daughter of Vladimir Poliakoff and former wife of British journalist Sir Gerald Reid Barry, with whom she had two sons.
- Rosamond Bernier (née Rosamond Margaret Rosenbaum, formerly Mrs Georges Bernier, formerly Mrs Lewis Riley), a lecturer and founder of the art magazine L'ŒIL. They married in 1975.

== Death ==
Russell died on 23 August 2008 at a hospice in the Bronx.

== Books ==
His books include:

- Shakespeare's Country (1942, revised 1946 and 1949) London: B. T. Batsford
- Switzerland (1950)
- Erich Kleiber: A Memoir (1957)
- Paris (1960)
- Francis Bacon (1964, revised 1979)
- Seurat (1965) The World of Art Library series ISBN 0-500-20032-7
- Vuillard (1971) ISBN 0-8212-0281-2
- Henry Moore (1973) ISBN 0-1402-1622-7
- Lucian Freud (1974) Catalog of 1974 exhibition at Hayward Gallery, London. Published by The Arts Council of Great Britain
- Turner in Switzerland (1976) with Andrew Wilton
- The Meanings of Modern Art (1981; revised 1992) ISBN 0-500-27573-4
- Reading Russell: On Ideas, Literature, Art, Theatre, Music, Places and Persons (1989) ISBN 978-0-500-23568-3
- Matisse: Father & Son (Harry N. Abrams, Inc., 1999) ISBN 0-8109-4378-6
- Marc Klionsky (Hudson Hills, 2004)
