= National Enterprise Board =

United Kingdom government body

The National Enterprise Board (NEB) was a United Kingdom government body. It was set up in 1975 by the Labour government of Harold Wilson, to support the government's interventionist approach to industry. In 1981 the Conservative government of Margaret Thatcher, combined the NEB with the National Research Development Corporation (NRDC) to form the British Technology Group.

== Background ==
The NEB was the brainchild of the economist Stuart Holland and the Shadow Secretary of State for Industry Tony Benn in the early-1970s. It was modelled on, and hoped to replicate the success of the Italian Istituto per la Ricostruzione Industriale (IRI), a public holding company, which was seen as having been a major component of the Italian economic miracle after World War II. In Holland's view, nationalisation had gained a bad name in Britain because only run down or declining industries had been nationalised, so public ownership became associated with failure; the IRI on the other hand was a public body which controlled thriving sectors of the Italian economy, an example which Holland wanted to replicate. In its original conception, the NEB was intended to extend public control and ownership of the economy, by taking a stake in the UK's twenty-five leading manufacturing firms, which would then be required to make planning agreements to meet economic targets. This was given impetus by a growing desire amongst Labour's left-wing to fulfil the promise contained in Clause IV of the Party's constitution, for social ownership of the economy.

Although the leadership of the Labour Party did not fully accept these proposals, they appeared in the Labour Party's manifesto for the February 1974 general election and the October 1974 election.

The Labour Party manifesto for the October 1974 general election stated:

We shall set up a National Enterprise Board to administer publicly-owned share-holdings: to extend public ownership into profitable manufacturing industry by acquisitions, partly or wholly, of individual firms; to stimulate investment; to create employment in areas of high unemployment; to encourage industrial democracy; to promote industrial efficiency; to increase exports and reduce our dependence on imports; to combat private monopoly; and to prevent British industries from passing into unacceptable foreign control.

A new and urgent Industry Act will provide for a system of Planning Agreements between the Government and key companies to ensure that the plans of those companies are in harmony with national needs and objectives and that Government financial assistance is deployed where it will be most effectively used. Wherever we give direct aid to a company out of public funds we shall reserve the right to take a proportionate share of the ownership of the company; and wherever possible this public support will be channelled through the Planning Agreements System.

== History ==
The plans were outlined in the 1974 White Paper The Regeneration of British Industry and the Industry Act 1975 enacted these measures, establishing the NEB.

Its primary role was that of holding a substantial level of equity in major manufacturing companies. In its final form the NEB was watered down from its original proposals, with planning agreements being made voluntary instead of compulsory. It took equity in various companies including British Leyland, Rolls-Royce, Alfred Herbert, Sinclair Radionics, International Computers Limited (ICL) and Ferranti.

=== Activities ===
There was some debate over what the exact role of the NEB should be. In practice its main activity became one of rescuing failing companies, with mixed results. By 1979 no less than 85% of its budget had been spent on the ailing manufacturers Rolls-Royce and British Leyland. It also made efforts to develop Britain's fledgling electronics and computer industries.

One of the first tasks of the NEB was the production of the Ryder Report, named after the NEB's new chairman, Lord Ryder, on the future of British Leyland (BL). BL had been nationalised the previous year after going to the government for financial aid.

In 1975 the NEB bailed out the struggling electronics firm Ferranti with a £7m injection (equivalent to £54,370,000 in 2025) and effectively nationalised it, acquiring a 65% share of the company. After restructuring, it was returned to the private sector in 1980 as a profitable company.

Also in 1975, the NEB invested £25 million (equivalent to £194,170,000 in 2025) into the loss-making machine tool manufacturer Alfred Herbert to modernise the business and reduce borrowings, but the company did not have long term success; it was acquired by Tooling Investments in 1980 and went into receivership in 1982.

The loss-making Cambridge Instrument Company was acquired by the NEB in 1976, who performed a substantial reorganisation of the business. It was returned to profitability and privatised again in 1979.

The NEB invested money, and took equity in various small and medium sized companies. By 1977, the NEB had a holding in 16 different companies, including the British assets of the bankrupt Fairey Group which it acquired in a bidding contest.

In 1977 the NEB rescued Sinclair Radionics from bankruptcy, provided a loan facility and took effective control of the company by acquiring a 73% stake.

The memory and microprocessor company Inmos was set up by the NEB in 1978. It captured 60% of the global market in static RAM devices. The government's shares in the company were sold to Thorn EMI in 1984.

The NEB only ever reached one planning agreement with a private company, when it bailed out Chrysler Europe in order to save jobs, however the planning agreement was breached in 1978 when Chrysler sold its operations to Peugeot.

=== Demise ===
After the Conservative Party took power in 1979 under Margaret Thatcher's leadership, the NEB's powers began to be eroded. The last Labour-appointed chairman of the NEB was Sir Leslie Murphy, who resigned with his entire board when Sir Keith Joseph (the new industry minister) decided to remove its responsibility for the government's holding in Rolls-Royce later that year.

The next chairman was Sir Arthur Knight who was content to lose a number of companies, but strongly supported the Inmos microchip project. However he eventually became frustrated by the government and resigned in November 1980. The 1980 Industry Act and new Guidelines had restricted the NEB role to a catalytic investment role, nationally and regionally, particularly related to advanced technology and small firms.

Knight was succeeded by his deputy, Sir John King (later Lord King of Wartnaby), who proceeded, with some vigour, to dismantle most of the board's remaining activities.

In 1981, under the chairmanship of Sir Frederick Wood, the NEB was combined with the National Research Development Corporation (NRDC) to form the British Technology Group (BTG).

In 1992 BTG was transferred to the private sector and in 1995 listed on the London stock exchange as BTG plc, when it became a leading technology transfer company that commercialised intellectual property acquired from research organisations and companies around the world.

== List of chairmen ==
- 1975–1977: Lord Ryder
- 1977–1979: Sir Leslie Murphy
- 1979–1980: Sir Arthur Knight
- 1980–1981: Sir John King
- 1981: Sir Frederick Wood

== See also ==
- National Research Development Corporation
- Minister of Technology
- Alvey
