= Leslie Murphy (businessman) =

British businessman and chairman of the National Enterprise Board (1915-2007)

Sir Leslie Frederick Murphy (17 November 1915 – 29 September 2007) was a British businessman who became chairman of the National Enterprise Board.

== Career ==
Murphy was educated at Southall Grammar School and Birkbeck College, London, where he graduated with a first-class degree in Mathematics. He joined the Civil Service during the Second World War. After leaving the civil service he became chairman of Mobil Supply and Mobil Shipping in 1955, Finance Director of the Iraq Petroleum Company in 1959 and a corporate finance specialist at Schroders in 1964. He was ultimately promoted to Deputy Chairman at Schroders in 1972. He went on to be Chairman of the National Enterprise Board in 1977 but resigned with his entire board when Sir Keith Joseph (the new industry minister) decided to remove its responsibility for the government's holding in Rolls-Royce in 1979.

He was created a Knight Bachelor in the 1978 New Year Honours and died in September 2007.

Murphy also made occasional forays into politics. A Labour sympathiser, he was employed as Private Secretary to Hugh Gaitskell at the Ministry of Fuel and Power during the late 1940s. However, in 1981 he was one of the 100 advertised signatories to the Limehouse Declaration, the founding statement of the newly-established Social Democratic Party (SDP). He was a trustee of the SDP throughout its entire existence, and after it merged with the Liberal Party in 1988 he then became a trustee of the renegade 'continuing' SDP until it was dissolved by its leader, David Owen, in 1990.

== Family ==
He married Marjorie Cowell in 1940; they had a son and a daughter. After the death of his first wife, he married Dorothy Murray in 1993.
