= John Downey (RAF officer) =

Royal Air Force commander (1920–2010)

- Born: John Chegwyn Thomas Downey; 26 November 1920; Streatham, London
- Died: 14 February 2010 (aged 89)
- Military career
- Allegiance: United Kingdom
- Branch: Royal Air Force
- Service years: 1939–75
- Rank: Air Vice-Marshal
- Service number: 42208
- Commands: Bomber Command Development Unit (1959-60); Middle East Defence Secretariat, HQ Near East Air Force (1960-63); RAF Unit Farnborough/Experimental Flying Department (1963-65); HQ Southern Maritime Air Region (1969–71); RAF College of Air Warfare (1969)
- Conflicts: Second World War
- Awards: Companion of the Order of the Bath; Distinguished Flying Cross; Air Force Cross

Air Vice-Marshal John Chegwyn Thomas Downey, CB, DFC, AFC (26 November 1920 – 14 February 2010) was a senior commander in the Royal Air Force.

Downey qualified as a pilot just before his 19th birthday and started the Second World War by flying North Sea patrols with 608 squadron. He then spent some time flying Spitfires with a Photo-Reconnaissance unit based in St Eval, Cornwall. In September 1941 he transferred to Gibraltar to fly Catalinas and Swordfish with 202 Squadron. In 1942 he became a navigation instructor.

In 1944, he joined 224 Squadron flying (Lend-Lease) Liberators on anti-U-boat operations, again out of St Eval. In September 1944 he moved to Milltown in Scotland. He was awarded the Distinguished Flying Cross for his 224 Squadron service.

After the war he attended the Empire Central Flying School at Hullavington, and then joined the staff of the Empire Air Navigation School at Manby. While stationed at Manby, he flew 'Aries III', a modified Lincoln bomber taking off on 20 October 1950 on a round-the-world flight of 29,000 miles. The first leg of the journey established a then-world record flight time to Khartoum. A subsequent leg was from Mauritius to Perth, Western Australia; this was believed to be the first west-to-east non-stop flight across the Indian Ocean. For completing this round the world trip in 28 days Downey was awarded an Air Force Cross. Accompanying him on the flight were Squadron Leaders G.T. Thain, A.D. Frank and J.L. Mitchell.

He then went to the RAF Staff College, and in 1960 he became head of the Near East Defence Secretariat in Cyprus.

Various appointments followed including roles at the MoD and NATO. After serving as the Deputy Controller of Aircraft at the MoD, Downey retired from the RAF in December 1975. Six months earlier he had been appointed a Companion of the Order of the Bath.

Downey married, in 1941, Diana White.
