= Frederick Kearns =

Sir Frederick Matthias Kearns, KCB, MC (21 February 1921 – 7 August 1983) was an English civil servant.

Educated at Burnley Grammar School and Brasenose College, Oxford, he served in the Royal Fusiliers during the Second World War and won the Military Cross in 1944. Demobilised after the war, he entered the civil service. He was secretary to the commission investigating the Crichel Down affair in 1956 and was subsequently the Ministry of Agriculture, Fisheries and Food's regional controller for Newcastle. In 1960, he returned to MAFF and was its Second Permanent Secretary from 1973 to 1978, during which time he was a key member of the UK's delegation during negotiations with the European Community over the UK's adoption of the Common Agriculture Policy. He resigned in 1978 over disagreements between himself and the minister, John Silkin, which The Daily Telegraph explained where over "the much more assertive line towards the EEC" which Silkin and his government pursued. He later worked as a consultant to the National Union of Farmers.
