= Rosamond Bernier =

American journalist (1916–2016)

- Born: Rosamond Margaret Rosenbaum; October 1, 1916; Philadelphia, Pennsylvania, US
- Died: November 9, 2016 (aged 100); New York City, US
- Occupations: Journalist, lecturer
- Employer(s): Trinity College, Connecticut, Rice University
- Spouse: John Russell (art critic)
- Website: https://rosamondbernier.org/

Rosamond Bernier (1916–2016) was a journalist and lecturer known for founding the Paris-based magazine L'oeil and for her presentations on art history at the Metropolitan Museum of Art.

== Life and career ==
Bernier was born Rosamond Margaret Rosenbaum in Philadelphia, Pennsylvania. At the invitation of her father, the head of the board of directors of the Philadelphia Orchestra, notable people in the classical music field visited her home, including composer Sergei Rachmaninoff and conductor Leopold Stokowski. While visiting Mexico during college, at a rehearsal conducted by Carlos Chavez, she met Aaron Copland, who was playing the piano, and muralist Diego Rivera and painter Frida Kahlo, and befriended them all.

She abandoned college (Sarah Lawrence) and in 1946 moved to France, where she served as the first European Features Editor at Vogue. Two years later, she married the journalist Georges Bernier. In 1955, they founded L'oeil, an English language, Paris-based art journal. L'oeil published original work by famous artists, including some whose friendship she chronicled in her 1991 memoir, "Matisse, Picasso, Miro: As I Knew Them.". A subsidiary of the magazine produced 16 art books under the Bernier imprint.

In 1970, they divorced after a 20-year marriage, and Bernier moved to the United States. Looking for a new career, a friend that taught at Trinity College suggested she start lecturing in art history. She first started at Trinity, before moving to Rice University, and finally, New York City. There, she began a new career as what she called a "professional talker" on art and artists at the Metropolitan Museum of Art. Her 8:00pm lectures, delivered without notes and in full evening wear, sold out months in advance. In the late 1970s and early 1980s, she interviewed artists and narrated documentaries on television networks, including CBS and PBS.

In 1975, she married New York Times art critic John Russell, who had once been a contributor to L'oeil; at the wedding, Copland and Bernstein played central roles, and architect Philip Johnson hosted the event. After some 250 performances, Bernier stopped lecturing in 2008, the year Russell died. At her farewell lecture, before a standing ovation, Bernier spoke about the history of fashion and concluded by thanking the museum, her audience, and her husband, "who will never admit it, but he wrote some of my best lines."

In recognition of her contributions to French culture, she was made "Officier de l'Ordre des Arts et des Lettres" by the French government in 1980, and a "Chevalier de la Légion d'Honneur" in 1999. That year, King Juan Carlos I of Spain awarded her the "Cross of Isabel la Católica" for her contributions to Spanish culture. In 1998 she and John Russell were each named "Fellows for Life" by the National Academy Museum and School of Fine Arts. In 2004, they were named "National Treasures" by the Municipal Art Society of New York.

== Lectures ==
Thirteen of her lectures at the Metropolitan Museum have been videotaped for commercial distribution. Her first series of five hour-long programs on Matisse, Picasso, and Miró and her second four-part series on French Impressionism have been broadcast on national public television.

== Publications ==
- Bernier, Rosamond (2011). Some of My Lives: A Scrapbook Memoir. New York: Farrar, Straus and Giroux. ISBN 1250013976.
- Bernier, Rosamond (1991). Matisse, Picasso, Miro--as I Knew Them. New York: Knopf. ISBN 0394586700.
