= Esmé Berman =

South African art historian

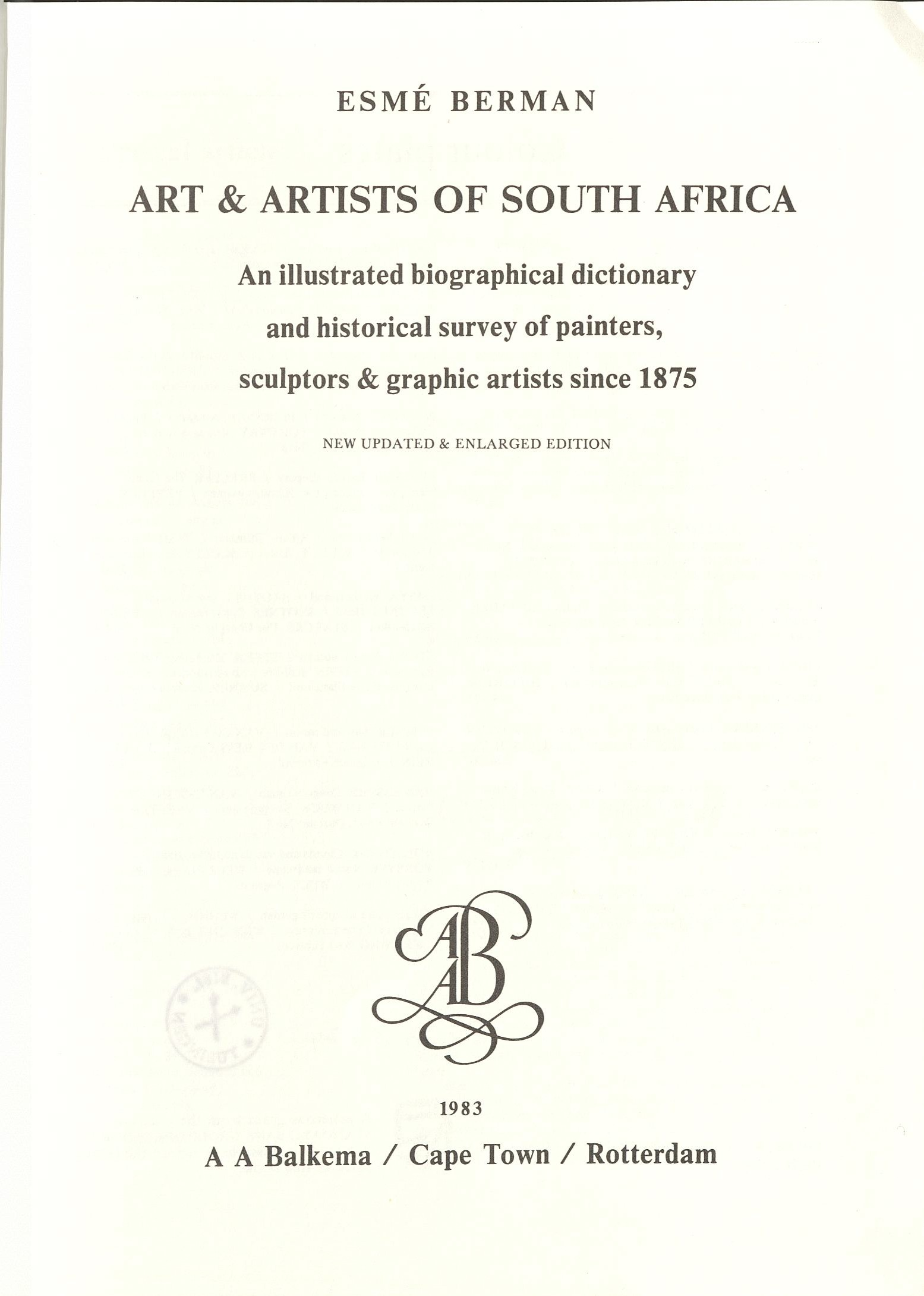
- Esmé Berman Art and artists 1983 title
- Born: 1929 (age 95–96); Johannesburg
- Occupation: Writer

Esmé Berman (1929 – 4 June 2017) was a South African art historian. She earned a degree in visual arts from the University of the Witwatersrand in 1946. In 1952, she married Hymie Berman, an art collector.

She is best known for writing Art and Artists of South Africa, the first comprehensive reference work on South African artists, in 1970. Witswatersrand conferred an honorary doctorate on Berman in 2016 to recognize her contributions to South African art.
