= Don Ryder, Baron Ryder of Eaton Hastings =

British businessman and Labour peer

The Right Honourable The Lord Ryder of Eaton Hastings

Member of the House of Lords
- Lord Temporal
- Life peerage 15 July 1975 – 12 May 2003

Personal details
- Born: 16 September 1916
- Died: 12 May 2003 (aged 86)

Sydney Thomas Franklin Ryder, Baron Ryder of Eaton Hastings (16 September 1916 – 12 May 2003), known as Don Ryder, was a businessman and Labour peer. The one-time Chair of the National Enterprise Board, he was involved in the creation of the Ryder Report, a restructuring plan for British Leyland during the 1970s.

== Life ==
Born in Brentford, Middlesex, Ryder attended Ealing County Grammar School (as it was then known). He was employed between 1950 and 1960 as editor at the London Stock Exchange Gazette, subsequently serving as the publication's managing director between 1961 and 1963. This proved the launch pad for a career in publishing and related businesses. He served as chairman and chief executive of Reed International between 1968 and 1975. In that year, in a desperate bid to stem Britain's accelerating industrial decline, the recently elected Wilson government created the National Enterprise Board (NEB), as part of a more interventionist economic strategy. Don Ryder was ennobled and appointed to chair the NEB, which he did between 1975 and 1977.

== Personal ==
Don Ryder married Eileen Dodds in 1950. The marriage resulted in two recorded children.

== Honours ==
Knighted in 1972, Ryder was created a Life Peer as Baron Ryder of Eaton Hastings, of Eaton Hastings in Oxfordshire on 15 July 1975.

== See also ==
- Austin Rover Group
