= L'ŒIL =

French art magazine (1955–present)

- Categories: Art
- Founder: Rosamond Bernier and Georges Bernier
- Founded: 1955
- Country: France
- Website: www.lejournaldesarts.fr/editions/loeil

L'ŒIL (French: The Eye) is a French magazine created by Rosamond Bernier (née Rosenbaum) and her second husband, Georges Bernier, in 1955 to celebrate and reflect contemporary art creation.
