= John Gregson, Baron Gregson =

British politician (1924–2009)

The Right Honourable The Lord Gregson DL HonFREng

Member of the House of Lords
- Lord Temporal
- Life peerage 11 July 1975 – 12 August 2009

Personal details
- Born: John Gregson; 29 January 1924 Bradford, Manchester, England
- Died: 12 August 2009 (aged 85)

John Gregson, Baron Gregson (29 January 1924 – 12 August 2009) was a British politician, and a member of the Labour Party.

== Life ==
Born John Gregson in 1924 in the Bradford district of Manchester, in the shadow of the Crossley Motor car company where his father worked, John grew up in Heaton Chapel, at the time a working class suburb of Stockport, close to the National Aircraft Factory Number 2, better known as Faireys.

Lord Gregson was a scientific industrialist by training who became managing director of Fairey plc after joining the company as a fifteen-year-old school boy. Lord Gregson was created a life peer 11 July 1975 as Baron Gregson, of Stockport in Greater Manchester. He served as Chairman of the Science and Technology Select Committee in the House of Lords for many years. He became a Deputy Lieutenant of Greater Manchester in 1979. In 1986 he was elected an Honorary Fellow of the Royal Academy of Engineering. From 1996 he was Treasurer of the Built Environment Group and was Honorary Life President of the Labour Finance and Industry Group.

After a trip to a London bookshop, Lord Gregson tripped and fell which resulted in a broken leg. Following complications he died in hospital on 12 August 2009. He was 85 years of age. Lord Gregson's funeral was held at St George's Church in Stockport with an additional memorial service in the Houses of Parliament in early 2010.

== Sources ==
- LORD GREGSON (Hansard, 23 July 1975)
- Death Announcement from The Daily Telegraph
