= Bugandi =

- Suburb
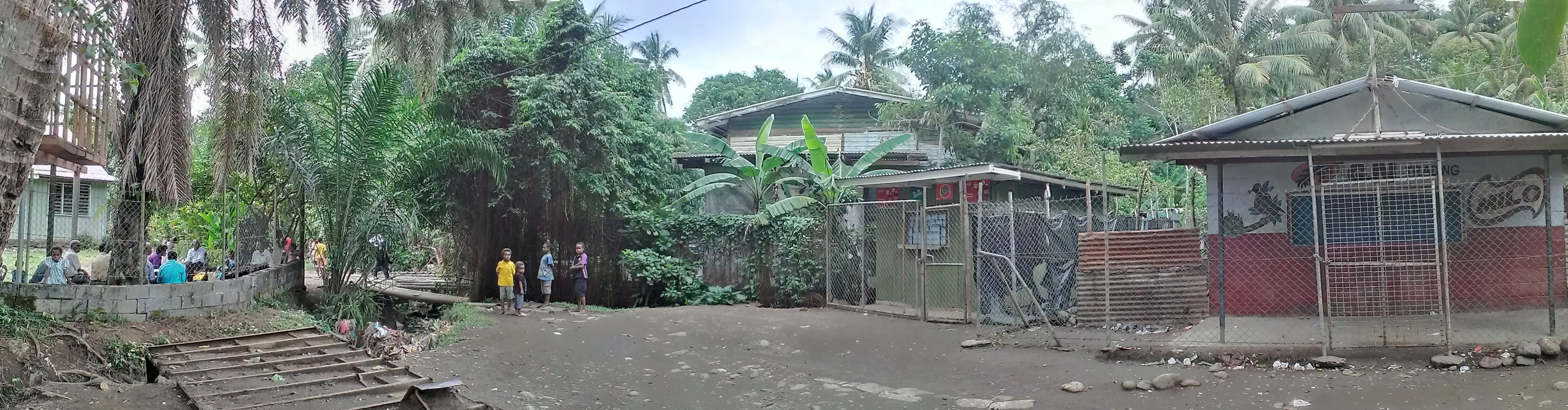
- Typical business area off Mountain Crescent - Boundary / Atzera Settlements. Church to left, shops to right. Improvised pedestrian bridge over creek

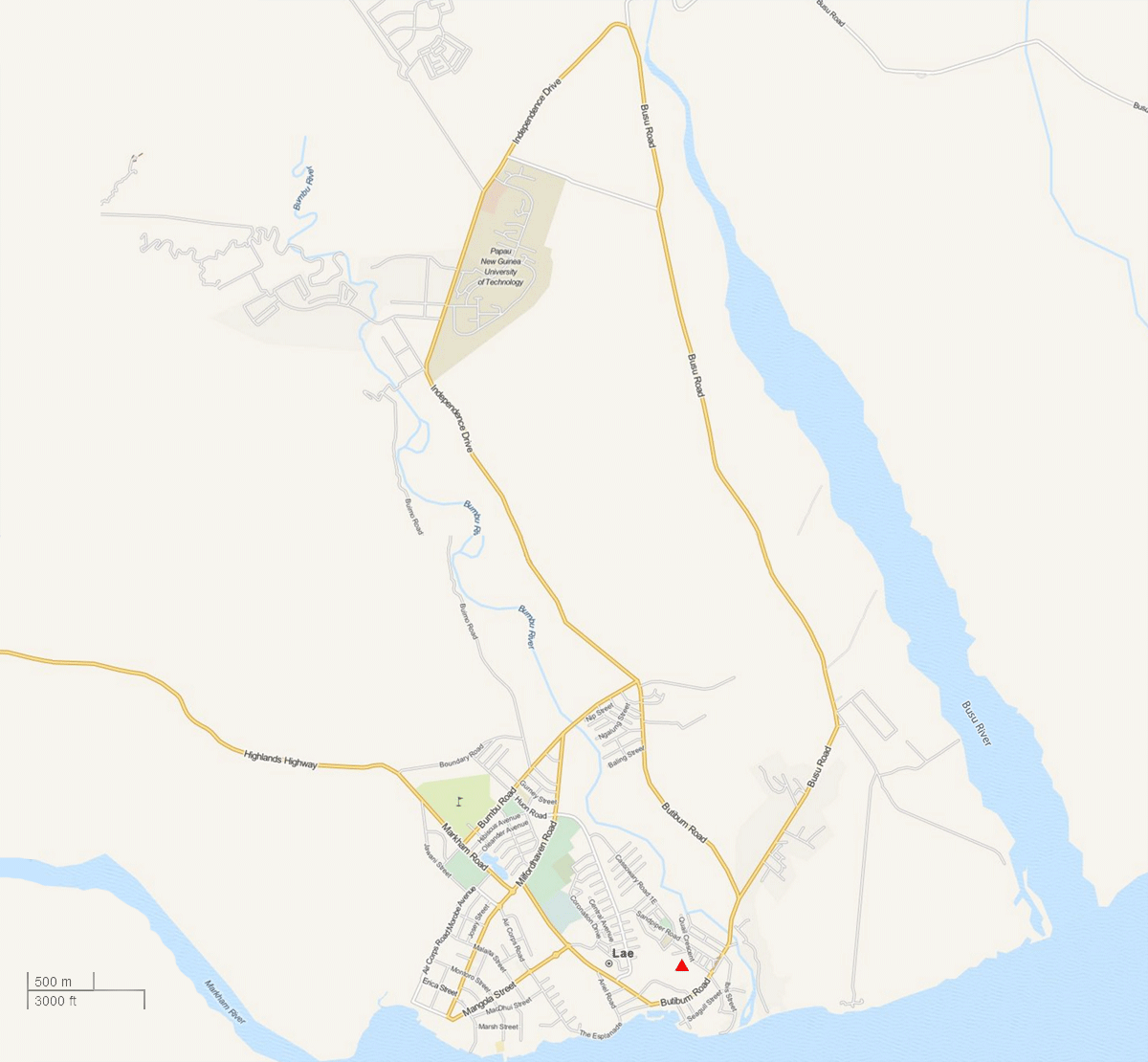
- Location in Lae
- Coordinates: 6°42′50″S 146°58′11″E
- Country: Papua New Guinea
- Province: Morobe Province
- District: Lae District
- Time zone: UTC+10 (AEST)

Bugandi is a suburb of Lae in the Morobe Province, Papua New Guinea.

== Location ==
Bugandi straddles the Highlands Highway and is located to the West and North of the Lae Golf Club, Eriku and North East of Lae central. According to the Lae Telephone Directory (Note: Lae telephone directory is available in hard copy only from PNG Directories Limited. Map 3 coordinates I1 to C5. Few online maps adequately depict the relationship to the Atzera settlements and Bugandi.) Atzera settlements are located to the North of the suburb and to the North West of Omili is the Timber Industry Training College.

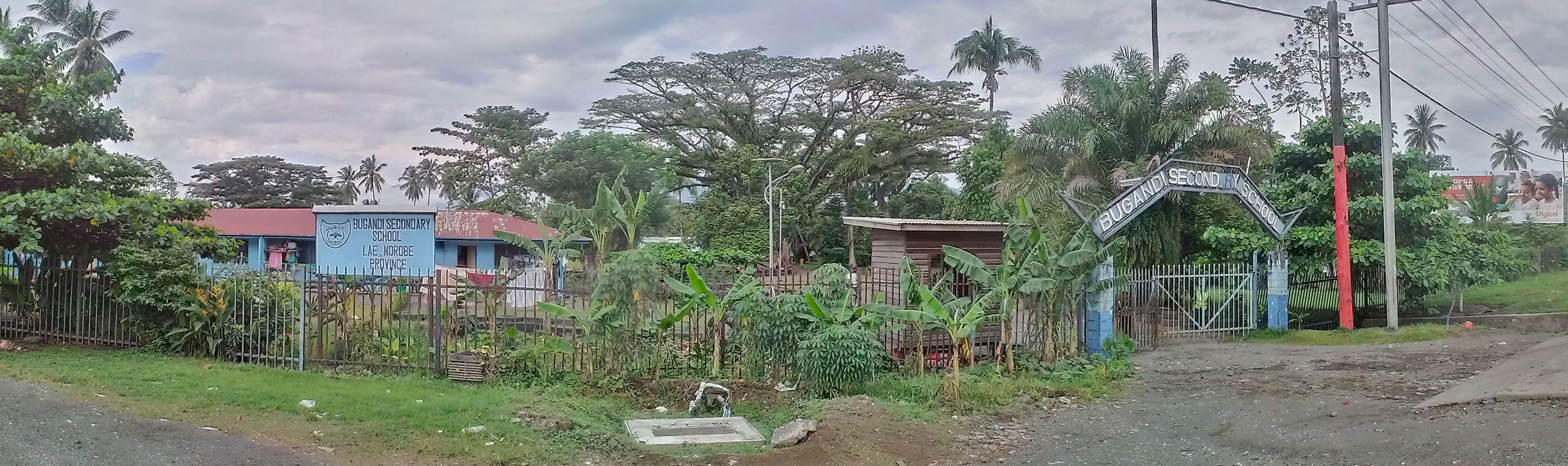
Bugandi High School Markham Road facing South West. Mount Shungol in background.

== Bugandi High School ==
Bugandi High School was built in 1959 requiring ten acres of rainforest to be cleared so that two classrooms, a dormitory, two houses and a mess could be built. Henry Robert Jack AMESBURY (Bugandi Jack) earned the nickname from his tireless work in establishing a boarding school amidst thick jungle in a swampy area called Bugandi, outside Lae in New Guinea. Carved from the jungle by students who cleared bush, installed drainage and established playing fields, food plots and cattle pens, Bugandi High School established a reputation for academic achievement and the quality of its rugby league players. Many Bugandi graduates went on to become political, business and professional leaders in Papua New Guinea.

In January 1960 the first classes began and by 1968 the school farm grew peanuts, soybeans and pineapples and raised pigs and poultry

In 1965 the school had become a full high school with 257 students but in 1966, Bugandi began enrolling students from all over the New Guinea mainland and forms 3 and 4 were begun

In 1995, Trukai Industries started a rice farming project at Bugandi Secondary School with the aim to promote rice production through Bugandi students with assistance from Trukai Industries field officers. The project also involved a collaborative research work with Papua New Guinea University of Technology on rice pest.

In 1998 the site hosted a trial to determine the potential of using dead cane toads (Bufus marinus) to control rice bug (Leptocorisa species) and a trial to examine the balance between brown planthopper and selected natural enemies

The project was handed over to the school on 17 March 1999 along with a donation of a hand tractor, farming implements, hand tools, fertiliser and chemicals for the next crop. and in 2000 the site was used for food security trials.

In September 2009 a Cholera outbreak affected students from Bugandi High School (and other schools) as a result of the sale of prepared food in the schoolyard markets. In the same month the PNG Ports Corporation Limited announced that port pilots will be able to be trained in Papua New Guinea using simulators and actively recruiting "really bright Grade 12 school leavers" from Bugandi High School to be trained as pilots next year.

In May 2013, students from Bugandi Secondary School and Lae Secondary School (Eriku) engaged in fighting resulting in one death and serious injury of another student

== Atzera Range ==
The Atzera Range starts at Bugandi and runs adjacent to the Markham River has an elevation of 280 meters above sea level.

Anticlines in the vicinity of Lae, such as the Atzera Range and hills near Situm, appear to indicate that the Ramu-Markham Fault (which follows the northern edge of the Markham Valley) changes dip close to the surface from a steep ramp to a shallow fault, breaching the surface south of Lae.

The Lae Seismic Zone has been identified between the Atzera Range and Situm which has the potential to generate shallow Mw~7.0 earthquakes and landslides around the Atzera Range. The possibility of major landsides in this area has increased as a result of human modification to the natural vegetation cover through clearing and gardening.

The 1983 floods remain the worst natural disaster since the establishment of the town in the late 1920s. Hundreds of people at the Five Mile settlement along the Highland Highway were also affected by mud-slides from the Atzera mountain ranges.

=== Atzera Range during World War II ===
Before the construction of the Highlands Highway, a road in the Atzera foothills connected Nadzab with Lae and a rough trail on the other side of the Atzeras paralleled this road from Lae to Yalu. Jensen's plantation was located in the Markham Valley and the location of battles between Japanese and Australian soldiers.

On 10 September the 25th Australian Infantry Brigade moved East from Nadzab towards Lae along the Atzera foothills while the 9th Division approached Lae from the East and on 16 September both units converged on Lae

=== Atzera Hills Project ===
In 1978 the Human Ecology Programme of the Department of Minerals and Energy, assisted by the UNEP and Unesco (Man and the Biosphere MAB Project 11) and in cooperation with the Lae City Council, instigated the Atzera Hills Project, described as an ecologically sound management system to arrest the rapid deterioration and loss of productive capacity of 600 ha of Atzera Hills.

The Atzera project folded after only three years despite efforts to train and raise awareness on the benefits of charcoal, the uptake in PNG households was minimal.

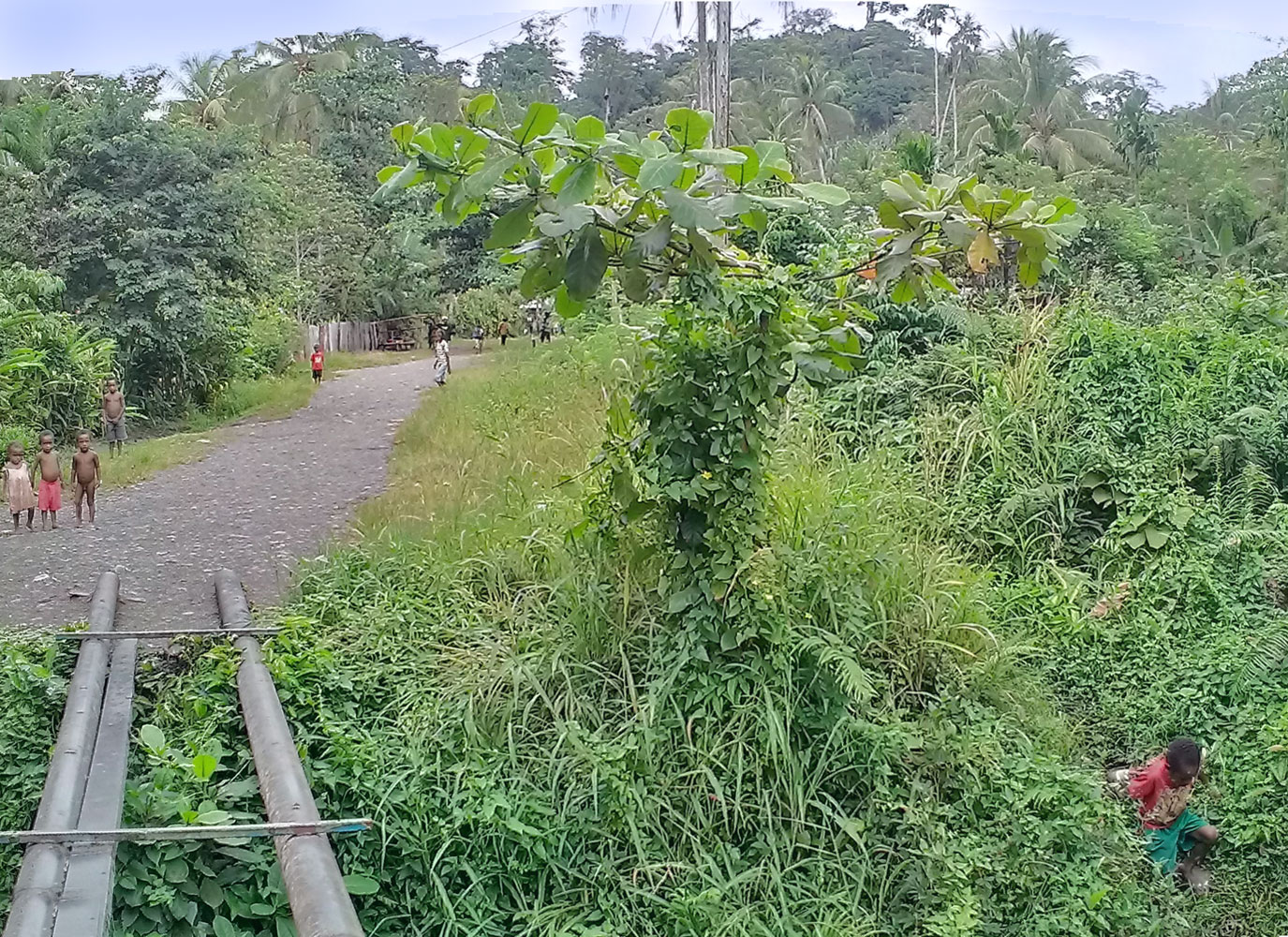
Improvised bridge on Mountain Crescent

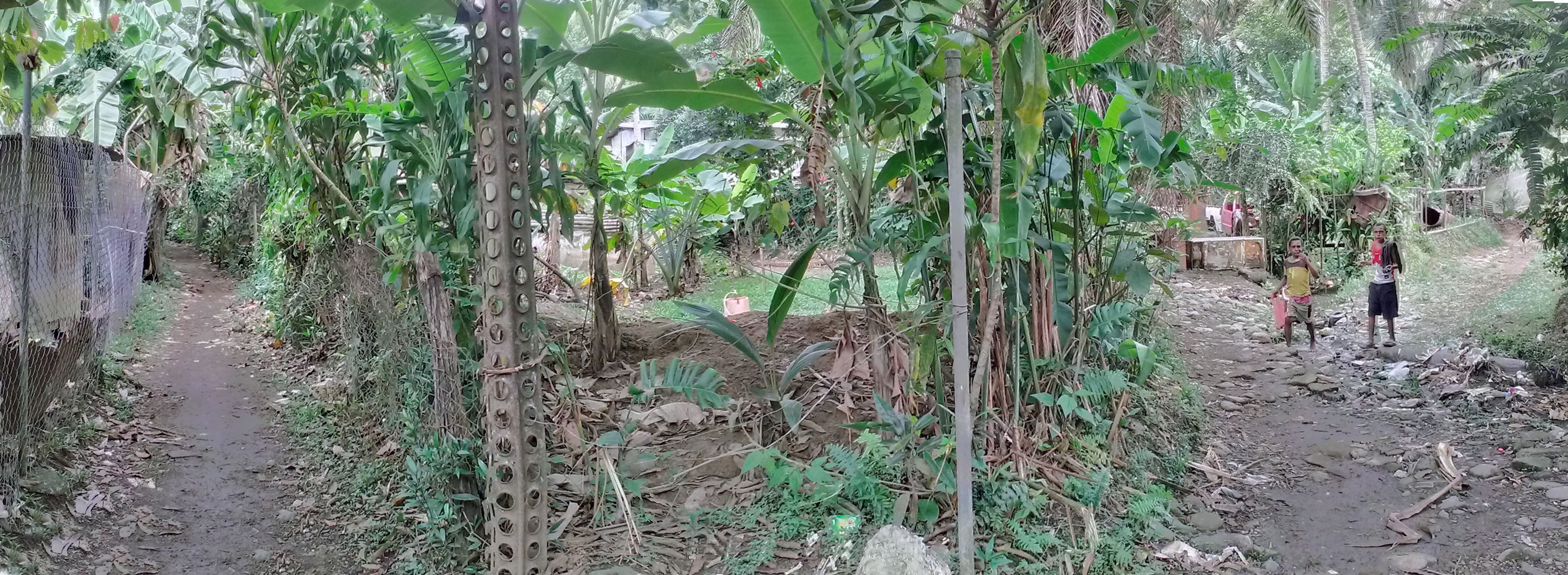
Typical foot lanes. Note the WW2 parts used as fence post.

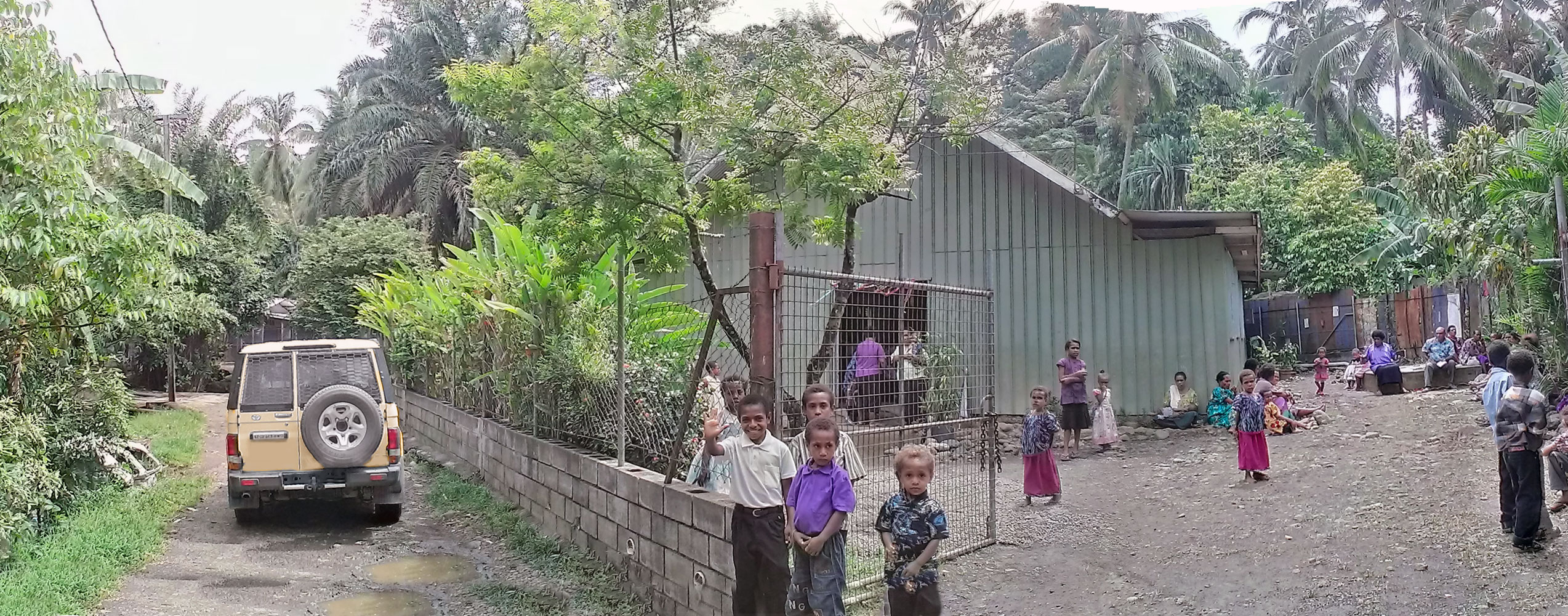
Seventh Day Adventist church

Heavy rains in 2005 resulted in the Morobe administration highlighting the vulnerability of the city to the weather and recommending that a major rehabilitation programme be started immediately to reforest the surrounding hills behind the city to prevent soil erosion. This problem has been exacerbated as a result of the increased number of squatter settlements.

== Atzera & Bumbu illegal settlements ==
Population pressures are produced by population drift which creates a need for land and food as well as squatter settlements, further aggravated by the extended family system particularly evident in the Atzera settlements.

By 1963 there were 400 persons living in the Bumbu settlement (10 percent of the Lae population). By 1976 this same settlement had grown to over 3000 people and in 1980 the population was officially recorded at 4460 persons living in 847 self-help units. In 1990 Bumbu settlement is the largest settlement in Papua New Guinea with 10,000 people spread over 40 hectares and 785 structures.

More than 90 percent of the settlers had been living at Bumbu for more than ten years. Most of the settlers migrated here during the colonial days in search of an easy and better life with money. Settlement buildings are usually made of wood, tin, cardboard and tar paper amongst other material representing a desperate effect to provide shelter.
