= Bumneng =

- Suburb
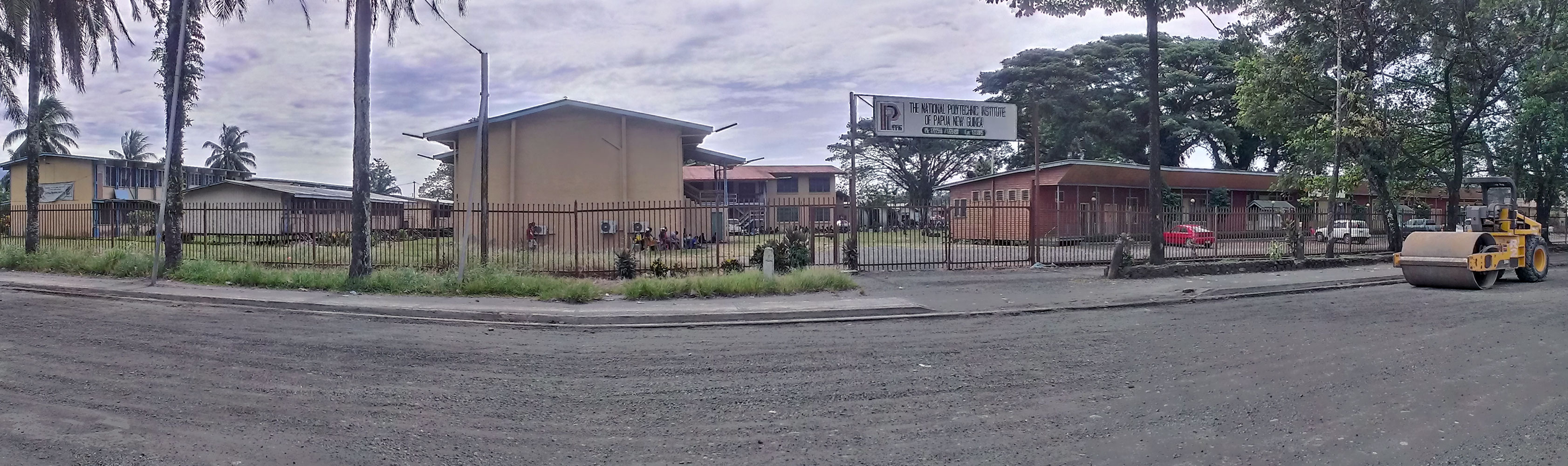
- Panoramic view of Lae Polytechnic College (formerly Lae Technical College). Facing south east

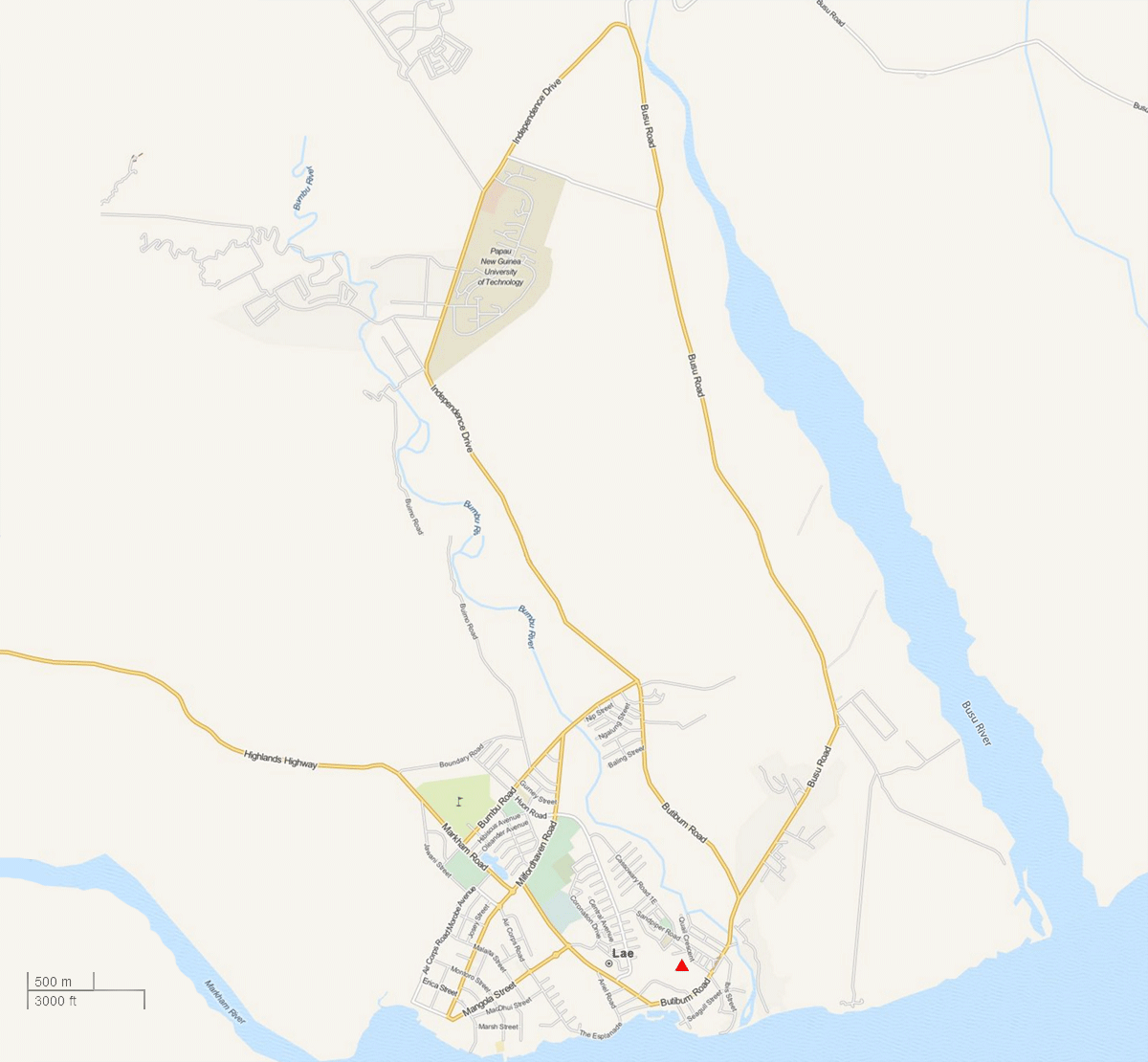
- Location in Lae
- Coordinates: 6°42′50″S 146°59′11″E
- Country: Papua New Guinea
- Province: Morobe Province
- District: Lae District
- Time zone: UTC+10 (AEST)

Bumneng is a suburb of Lae in the Morobe Province, Papua New Guinea.

== Location ==
The location of Bumneng, according to the Lae telephone directory (Note: Lae telephone directory is available in hard copy only from PNG Directories Limited. Map 3 coordinates J8. Few online maps mention this suburb.) is west of Bumbu River, north of Botanical Gardens, east of Eriku and south of Omili.

Within the suburb of Bumneng is the Admin Compound, Soccer Association, Lae Botanic Gardens and Lae Polytechnic College.

== Lae Polytechnic College ==
Lae Polytechnic College is located on Milford Haven Rd at the junction of Bumbu Road Bumneng.

Formerly Lae Technical School it was established is in 1953 at Busu Secondary grounds and relocated to present site between 1954 and 1955. In 1965 the school was changed to a college. In December 2009, the status changed again from college to a polytechnic institute and is now called the National Polytechnic Institute of PNG in line with the National Education Plan. In 2011 a study found that employers were dissatisfied with the services provided by the colleges and strongly emphasised the need for a coordinating education authority.

In 2013 expansion plans for the Institute were impeded by illegal settlements near the National Polytechnic Institute.

== Admin Compound ==
The Admin Compound is located between the Bumbu River and behind the Lae Polytechnic College. According to census date, there are 47 households with a population of 381 persons.

== Flooding ==
Between December 1983 and July 1992, Lae experienced two major flood and mudslide disasters. In both cases, hundreds of people lost their homes. The 1983 floods remain the worst since the establishment of the town in the late 1920s. These floods left hundreds of people homeless particularly those living along the banks of the Bumbu River. Many houses were damaged or completely destroyed and hundreds of people at the Five Mile settlement along the Highland highway were also affected by mud-slides.

Meanwhile, provincial and national leaders met to find solutions to the problem of how to resettle people displaced by the disaster and to the north of the city a block of land was allocated, planned and developed for the resettlement of the disaster victims. This 'Tensiti' settlement was developed in 1992 on the former Serafini plantation with sealed road networks, water and electricity.

During the 2007 floods engineers were also working out how the flooding Bumbu River in Lae would be diverted to save residences at Admin Compound which were threatened by the floodwaters.
