= Lae Botanic Gardens =

Park in Lae, Papua New Guinea

Coordinates: 6.719509°S 146.995362°E

The Lae Botanic Gardens are located in Bumneng, Eriku and Lae City in the Morobe Province, Papua New Guinea. Within this location is the Papua New Guinea Forest Research Unit, the Papua New Guinea National Herbarium and the Lae War Cemetery.

== Description ==
The Lae Botanic Gardens occupies 38 hectares. The garden mostly consists of natural lowland rain forest with creeks running through. It also contains greenhouses for special Orchidaceae and Araceae collections.

The gardens are administered by the Papua New Guinea Forest Research Institute and have approximately 1500 - 2000 plant species. The landscape is dominated my many large buttressed trees which are densely covered by Epiphytes and climbers.

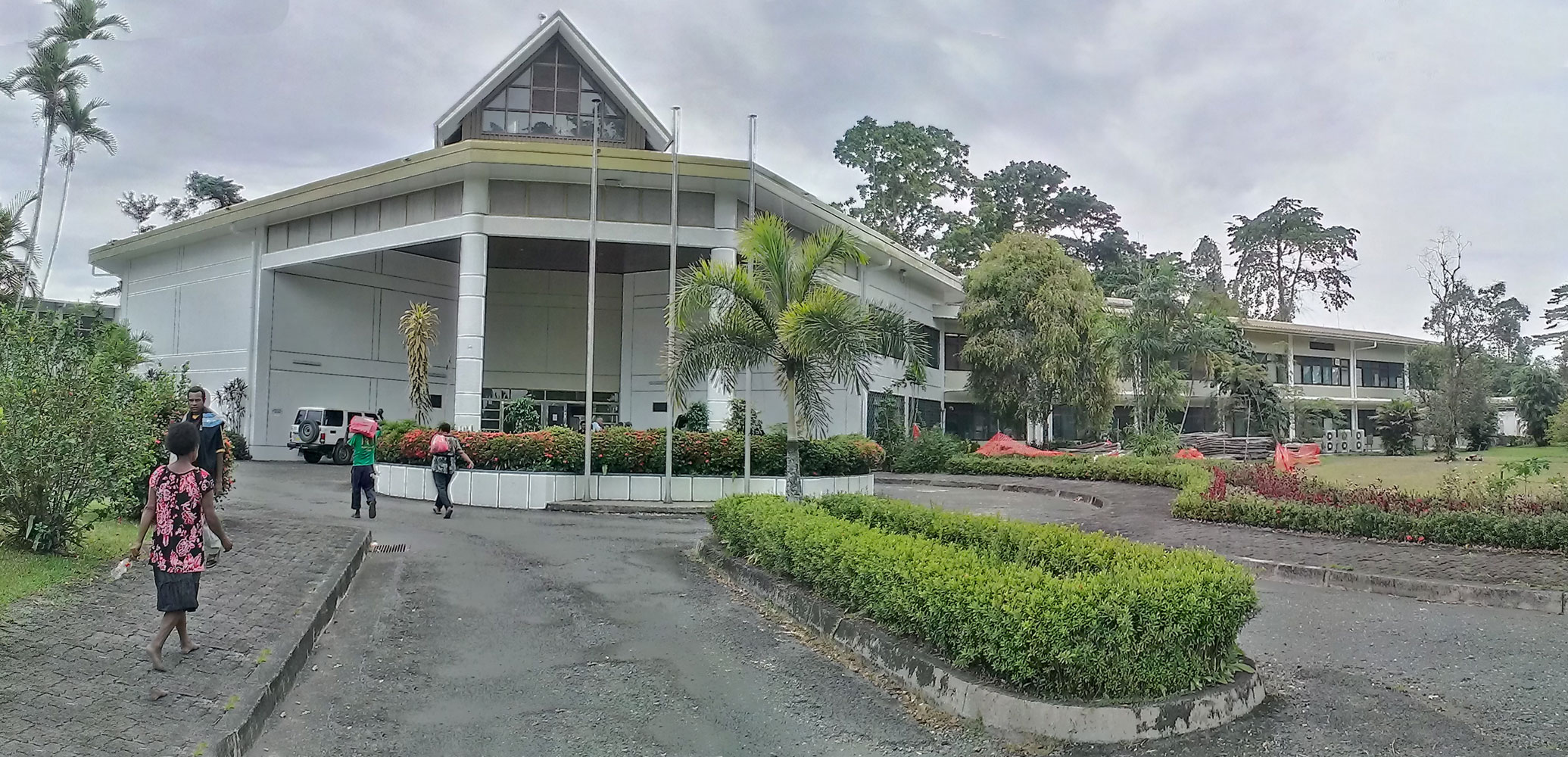
Photo of Forest Research Center, Lae Botanical Gardens.The Herbarium to the right of photo

== Papua New Guinea Forest Research Institute ==
The Forest Research Institute is located on Huon Road in the grounds of the Botanical Gardens. The building was donated by the Government of Japan as a symbol of friendship and cooperation in 1989 . (Note: Information sourced from plaque on front of building - viewed Feb 2014)The Forest Research Institute is a government agency that conducts research on the sustainable management and wise resource utilization of forest resources. The Forest Research Institute also provides a scientific basis for the management of PNG’s forest resources through research activities.

== Papua New Guinea National Herbarium ==
The Herbarium was established in the 1940s and is the largest plant specimen collection in Papua New Guinea with about 300,000 specimens including 2335 type specimens. There are 100,000 spirit collections. The Herbarium holds a representative plant collection from the neighboring regions such as the Indonesian provinces, the Solomon Islands, Western Indonesia, Malaysia and Tropical Australia.

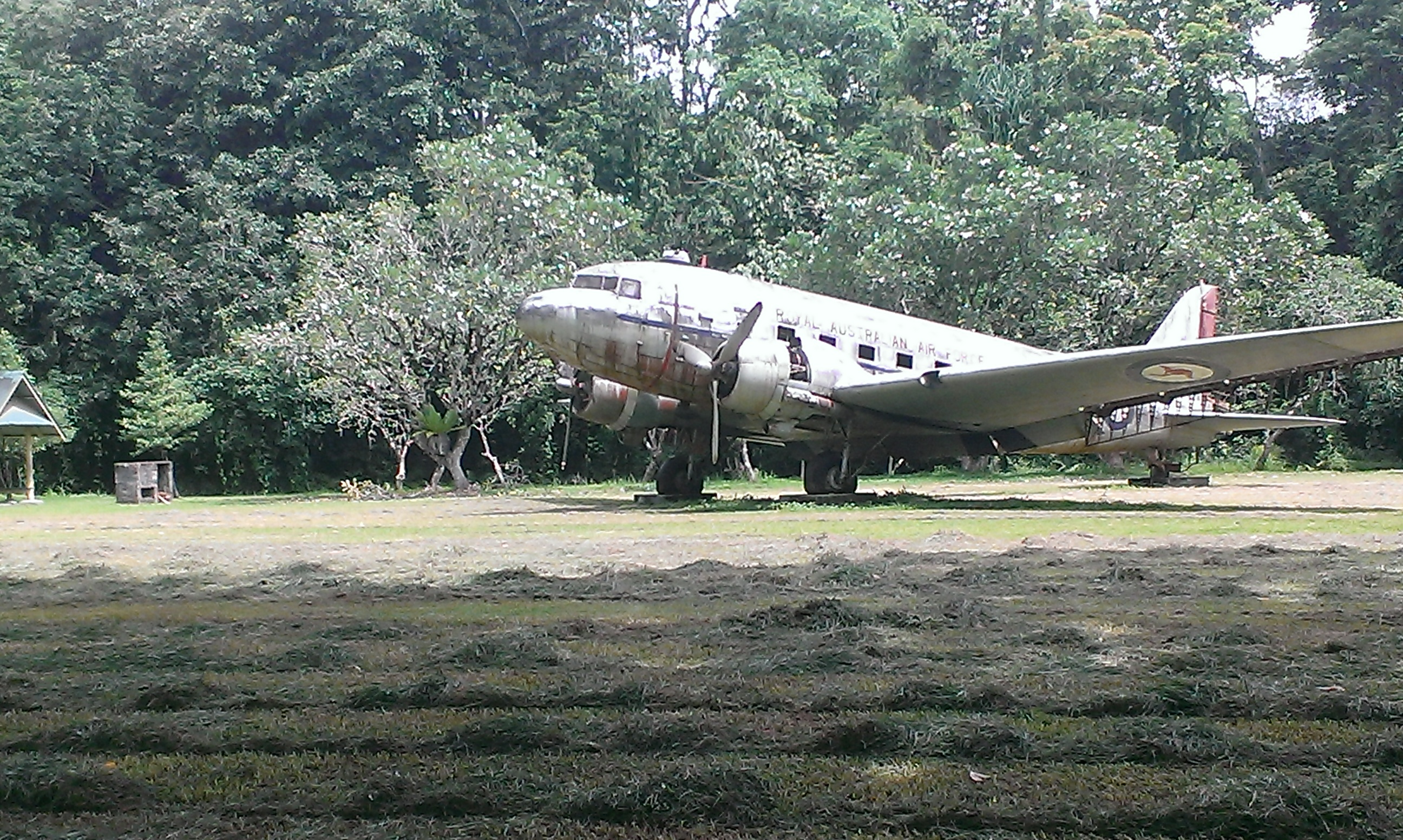
RAAF C47 located in Lae Botanical Gardens

The Herbarium also holds collections of a number of important collectors including Leonard John Brass, Lyndley Craven, Jim Croft, Ruurd Dirk Hoogland, Andrée Millar, R Pullen, J C Saunders, Richard Schodde, Wayne Takeuchi and J S Womersley. The herbarium ranks third in size in South East Asia.

In recent years the Herbarium has been involved in data-basing and digitizing its collections. The Herbarium is collaborating with the National Herbarium of NSW on the project plants of Papua New Guinea.
