= Andrée Millar =

Australian orchid specialist

Andrée Millar OBE
- Born: Andrée Norma Manners-Sinclair; Paris, France
- Died: 4 December 1995; Queensland, Australia
- Education: University of Auckland
- Occupation: Botanist
- Known for: Specialisation in orchids
- Notable work: Orchids of Papua New Guinea
- Spouse: John William Millar
- Children: Two

Andrée Millar OBE (ca. 1916–1995) was an Australian botanist who played an important role in the development of the botanical gardens of Papua New Guinea (PNG) and published a book on the orchids of PNG. The orchids, Dendrobium Andrée Millar and Coryphopteris andreae, were named after her.

== Early life ==
Andrée Norma Millar (née Manners-Sinclair) was born in Paris, France. Various sources put her year of birth between 1912 and 1916. She studied at Woodford House in New Zealand and then at the University of Auckland. Around this time, she met her husband, John William Millar (1912-1966), an engineer, and in 1947 accompanied him to his work in Bulolo, an important gold dredging centre in the former Territory of New Guinea, in what is now the Morobe Province of Papua New Guinea. The couple had a son and a daughter.

== Interest in horticulture ==
Living in the area drew Millar's attention to the possibility of plant collecting as a hobby. She began by collecting ferns and then orchids and other plants. She also taught at the international school in Bulolo. Attracting the interest of Forestry Officers with her collecting work, she began collecting both live and herbarium specimens for the Lae Botanic Gardens situated in PNG's second-largest city of Lae. She quickly attracted attention of the local people, who considered her somewhat eccentric for collecting what they regarded as "useless flowers". Known in New Guinea pidgin as Long-long Misis bilong plaua (Crazy flower woman), she used this as the title of a brief autobiography, published in 1994.

She and her husband moved to a cocoa plantation close to Lae and in 1956 she became a member of the staff of the Botanic Gardens. During her time there, she accompanied many collectors on field trips, including to the Jimi Valley and the Kokoda Track. She made three trips to the area of Mount Wilhelm, PNG's highest mountain. Away from the highlands, she visited the western part of Papua New Guinea, travelling along the Fly and Strickland rivers to Lake Murray. She also made a trip to the Herbert River in the north of Queensland. Millar led a party down Papua New Guinea's Yellow River and Sepik River. Roads were few and far between and her transport was mainly by plane, helicopter, boats and canoes, and on foot. Millar also visited Bouganville, New Britain and New Ireland islands.

Millar later moved to the capital, Port Moresby, to work at the National Botanic Gardens at the University of Papua New Guinea, becoming the curator in 1971, and being known as "Mum". She continued to undertake extensive collecting, particularly in PNG's Central Province. She became well-known through radio broadcasts. She would remain at the National Gardens until ill health forced her to leave.

Millar is generally agreed to have had a fairly forthright and abrasive personality. It is widely reported that she quelled a riot just by shouting at the rioters. Not only rioters caused her ire: she was also reported as having shouted at Michael Somare, at the time minister of health and soon to become prime minister of Papua New Guinea. Fiercely loyal to PNG, she was angered by an Indonesian at a conference talking about orchids in Indonesian Western New Guinea, saying that he had no right to talk about "our orchids". There were also people that she took a dislike to, including the world-renowned anthropologist, Margaret Mead.

== Publications ==
- Orchids of Papua New Guinea with photographs by Roy and Margaret Mackay. (1978, revised 1998).

In addition, Millar contributed journal articles, including to the American Orchid Society Bulletin.

== Awards and honours ==
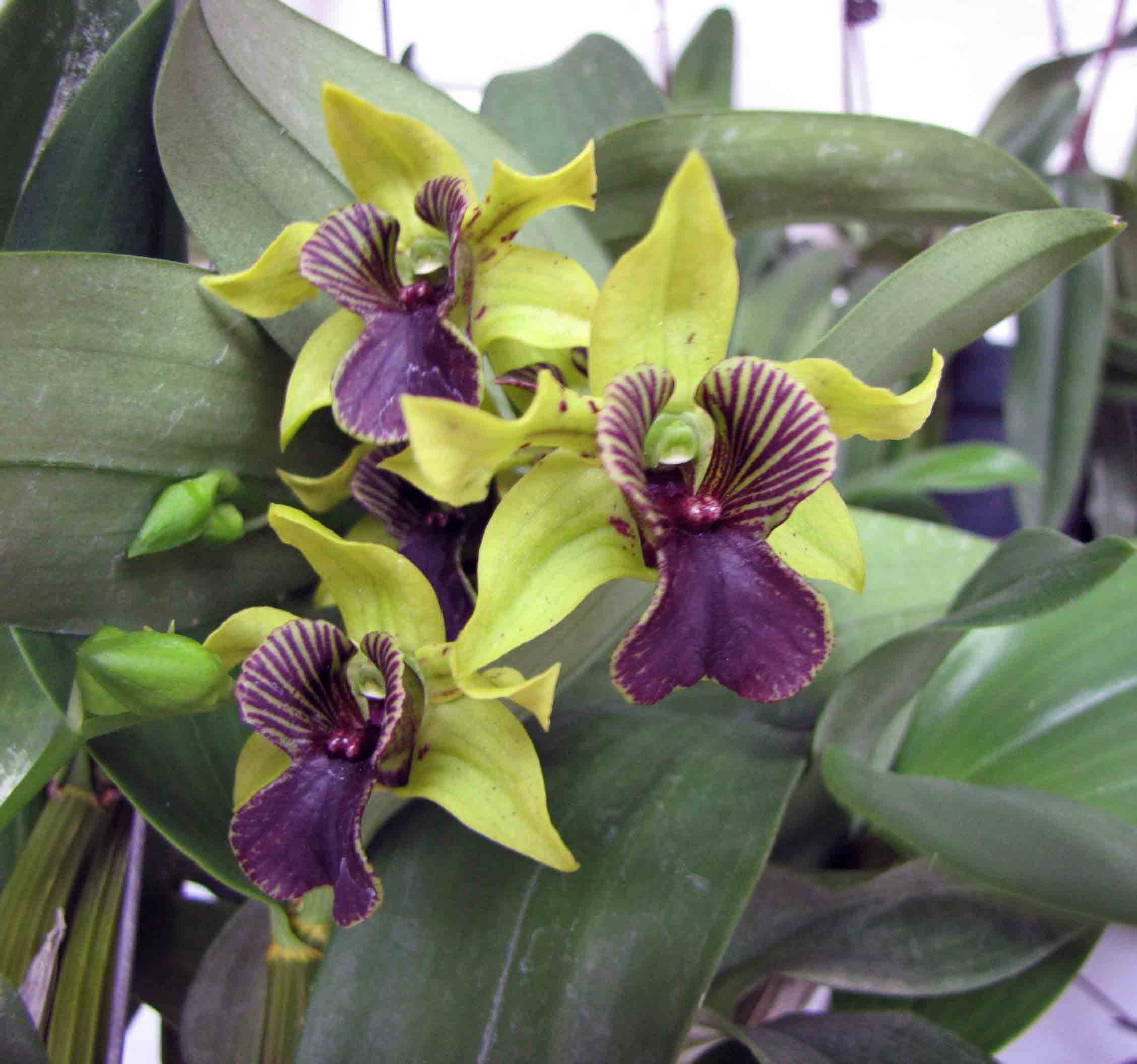
Dendrobium Andree Millar

- Papua New Guinea 10-Year Independence Medal (1985)
- Orchid Society of South East Asia Gold Medal
- Award of Honour, Australian Orchid Council
- Officer of the Order of the British Empire (1975). This was part of the last Queen's Birthday Honours awarded on the advice of Australia for Papua New Guinea, as the nation gained independence from Australia on 16 September 1975
- The Dendrobium Andrée Millar (Den. atroviolaceum x Den. convolutum) orchid was named after her.

== Death ==
Andrée Millar died on 4 December 1995 in Queensland, Australia. A Memorial Service was held for her in Port Moresby. Among those attending was the former Papua New Guinea Prime Minister, Michael Somare.
