= Eriku =

- Suburb
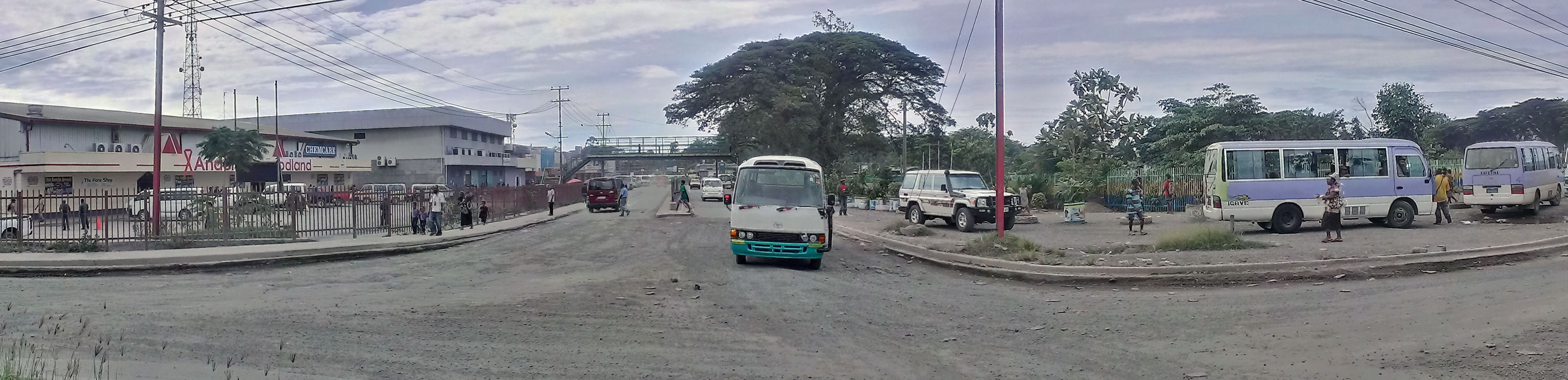
- Panoramic view facing South East towards Lae Central. Andersons on the left. Sports ground on the right of photo

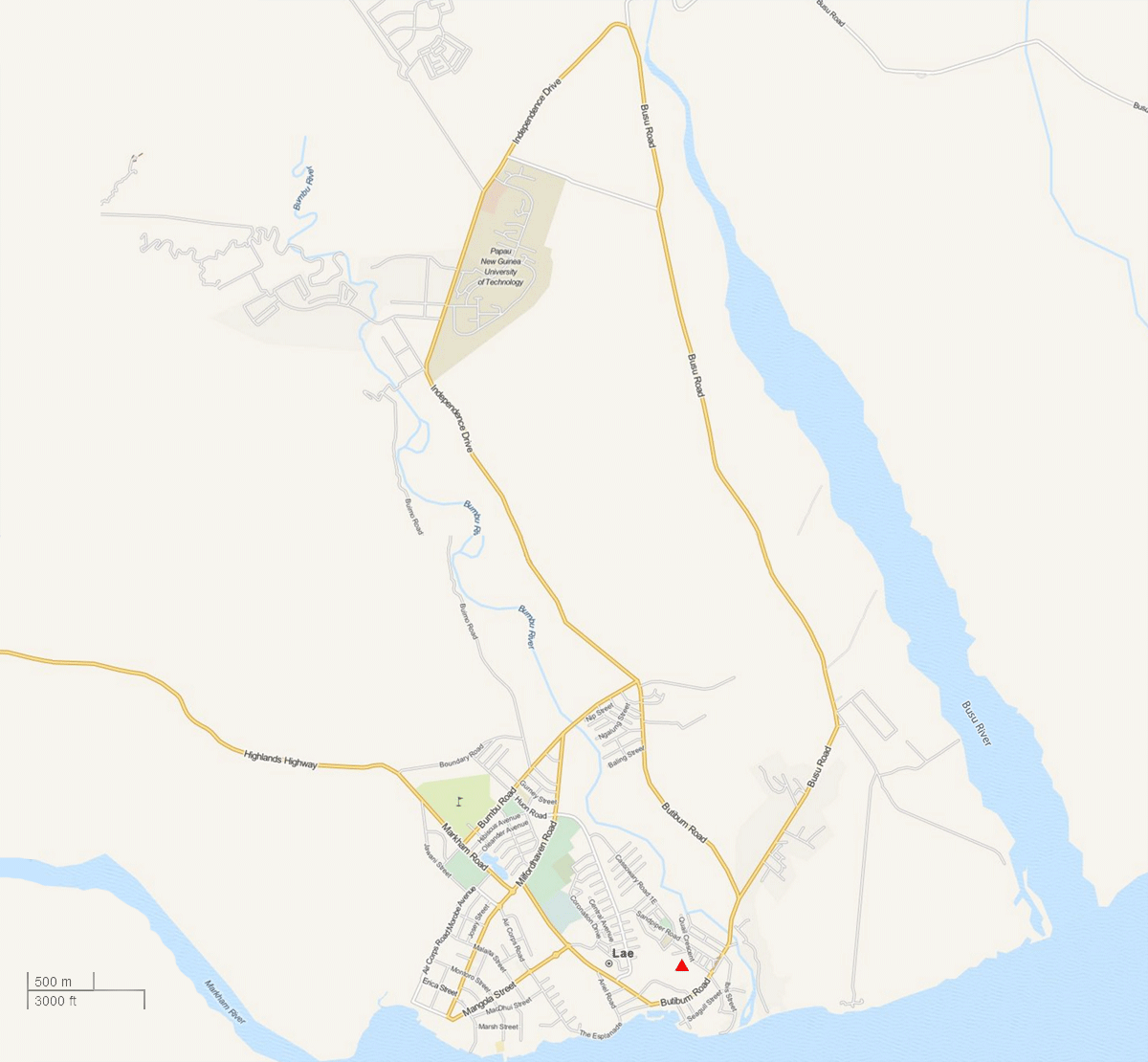
- Location in Lae
- Coordinates: 6°43′10″S 146°59′10″E
- Country: Papua New Guinea
- Province: Morobe Province
- District: Lae District
- Time zone: UTC+10 (AEST)

Eriku is a suburb of Lae in the Morobe Province, Papua New Guinea.

== Nomenclature ==
The name Eriku is said to derive from Eric Woo which was the first store to be built in the location

== Location ==
Eriku is located in the North of Lae, East of the Highlands Highway and North of Milford Haven Road. To the South of Eriku are the Lae Botanic Gardens. To the West is the Lae Golf Club.

== Infrastructure ==
=== Highlands Transport hub ===
The Eriku Public Motor Vehicle (PMV) terminal is the point of departure from Lae to the highlands.

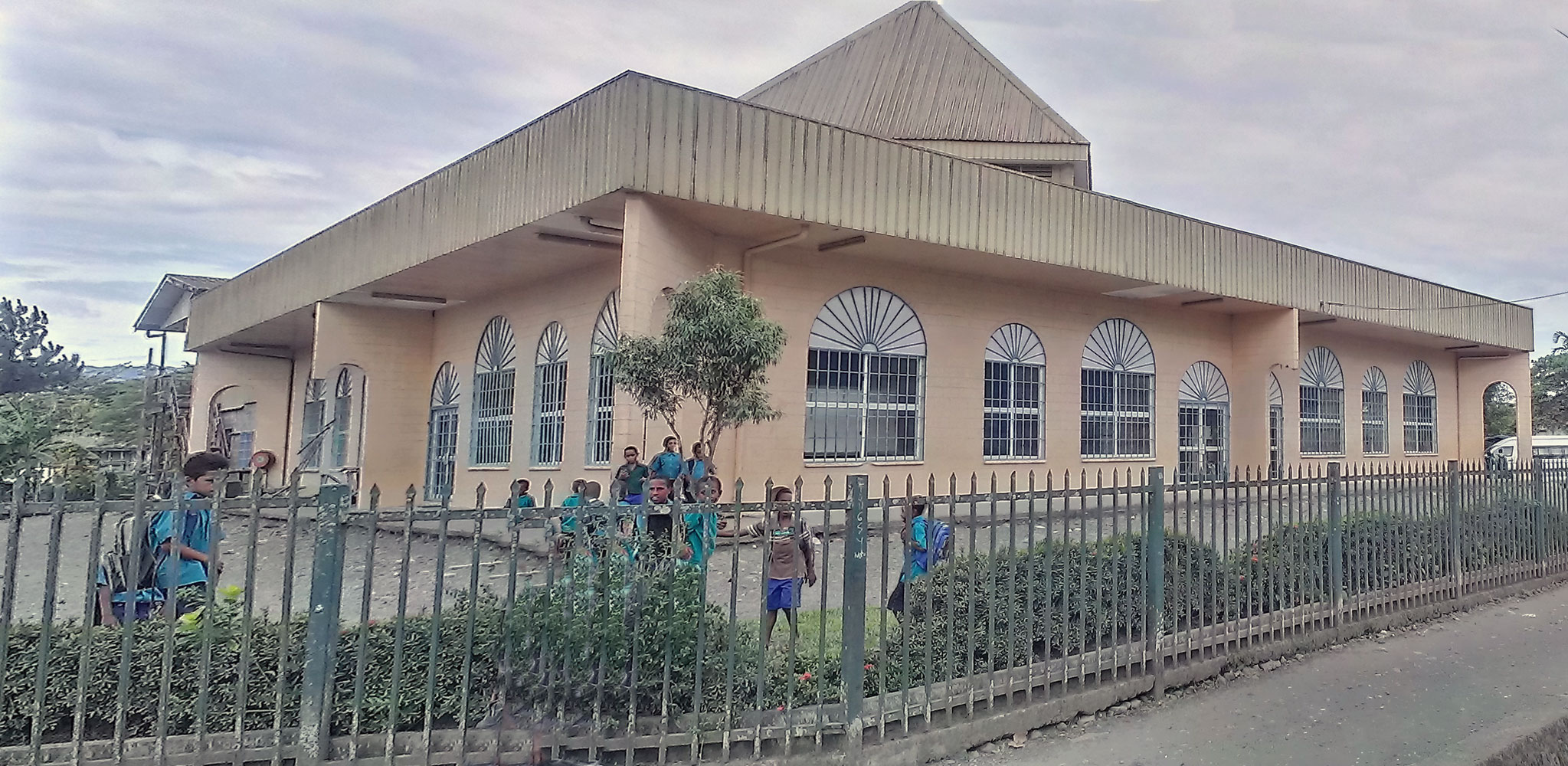
Salvation Army Church & Hostel

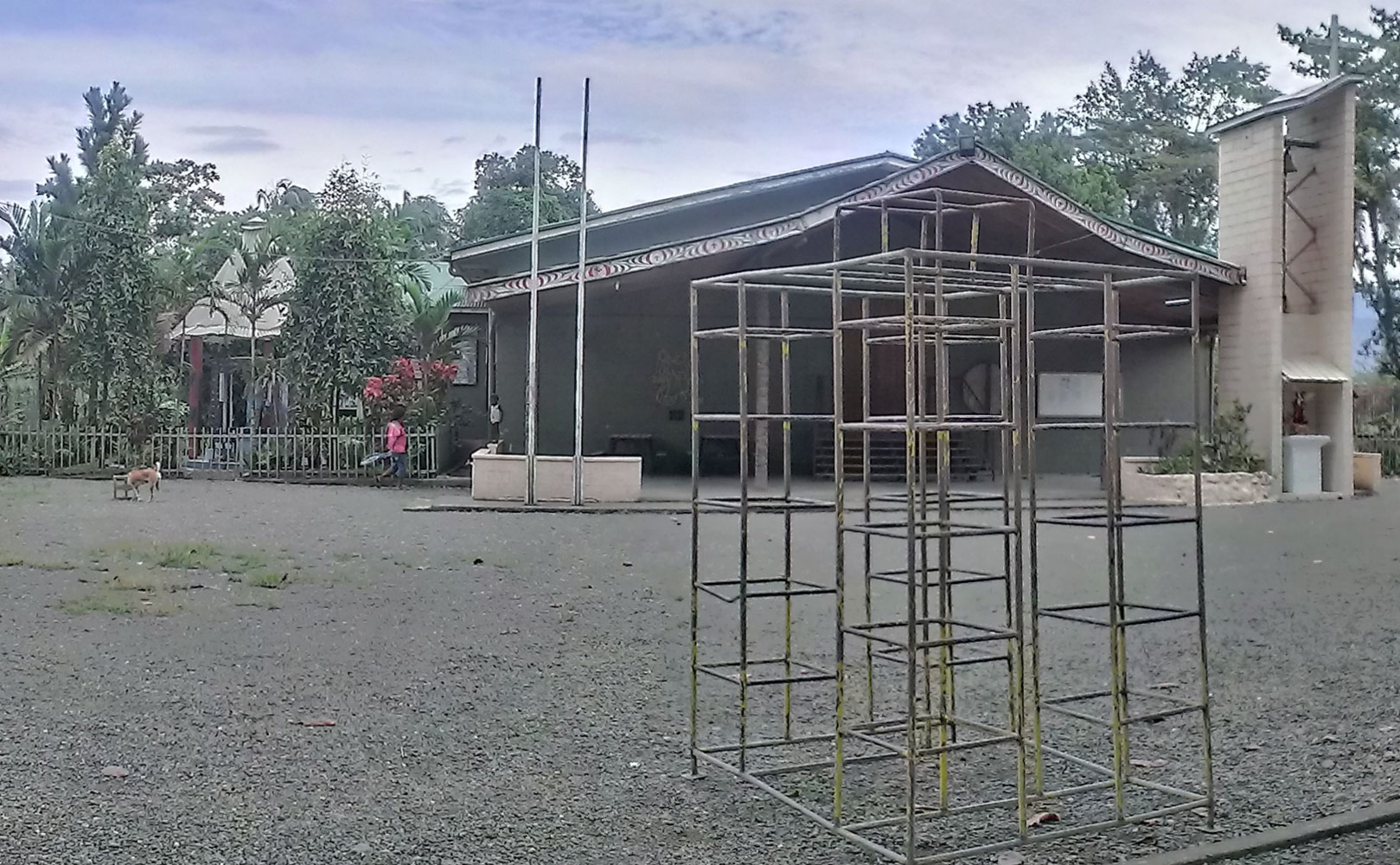
St. Michaels Catholic Church. Cnr. Huon & Milford Haven Rd

=== Papindo building ===
In 1987 the Lae Fish Supply company built the Papindo building in Eriku which was the location of the modern supermarket and department store.

=== Andersons Supermarket ===
Andersons Foodland is owned by the Chemcare Group (Chemcare) and is one of the largest supermarkets in Lae.

=== Billboard ===
An electronic advertising billboard is scheduled to be constructed on top of Papindo building in Eriku to coincide with the upcoming PNG games

== Law and Order ==
=== Eriku fire ===
In August 2010 a dawn fire, which started at about 5.30am, razed through Lotus Enterprise (Lotus Trading at Eric Woo) and, by 6am, hundreds of people, mainly looters from the nearby settlements of Boundary Road, Buimo, the Miles and Kamkumung, had gathered and looters broke their way into the two neighbouring shops, PC Woo and Raumai 18, and, in the process, reportedly raping a woman shop assistant. Members of the fire brigade, who are about a kilometre away, arrived more than an hour later after flames had engulfed the building and could do very little to save anything.

=== 2006 Riot ===
In October 2006, 300 angry mud-smeared Engans wielding bush knives, sticks and iron bars marched from Kamkumung to Eriku oval to protest the killing of one of their tribesmen by the driver and crew of a PMV bus. Western Highlanders, who own most of the PMV buses operating in Lae, withdrew their vehicles from the city roads fearing retaliation. During the past week one thousand Unitech students rioted leaving four families without homes and thousands of kina worth of properties destroyed. Residents called for the expulsion of illegal settlers as a result of constant violence in and around the city precincts.

=== 2009 Riot ===
On the 12 May 2009, Port Moresby experienced an anti-Asian demonstration following similar demonstrations in the Solomon Islands. The riots spread to Lae, Madang, Goroka, Kainantu and Mount Hagen targeting trade stores and kai (food) bars. Four Papua New Guinean nationals and three ethnic Chinese died during the riots, which were particularly violent in Lae and Mt Hagen. Before 10am, all shops, Chinese and local, all over the city were forced to close in fear of being looted.

=== 2011 Riot ===
In November 2011, large scale riots broke out in Lae following a petition and march on the Morobe Provincial Admin (Tutumang). The petition addressed four points, namely;

1. Lae city Authority Manager to be sacked for giving contracts to outsiders and not Morobeans.
2. Highlands PMV bus stop at Eriku to move to 9mile.
3. No more street selling in the city as it only breeds criminal activities.
4. Check on Lands Dept office and sack its staff for land corruption deals to Asians, outsiders etc.

A Vox populi reported in The National outlines the opinions of residents;

"I call on Luther Wenge to take a bus ride from town to Eriku and see first-hand how the city is like"
""It is frustrating and scary for me as a woman to catch a PMV from Eriku to work"

The violent riots have crippled Papua New Guinea's main industrial centre with widespread destruction of property and government is warning it may declare a state of emergency.

== Education ==
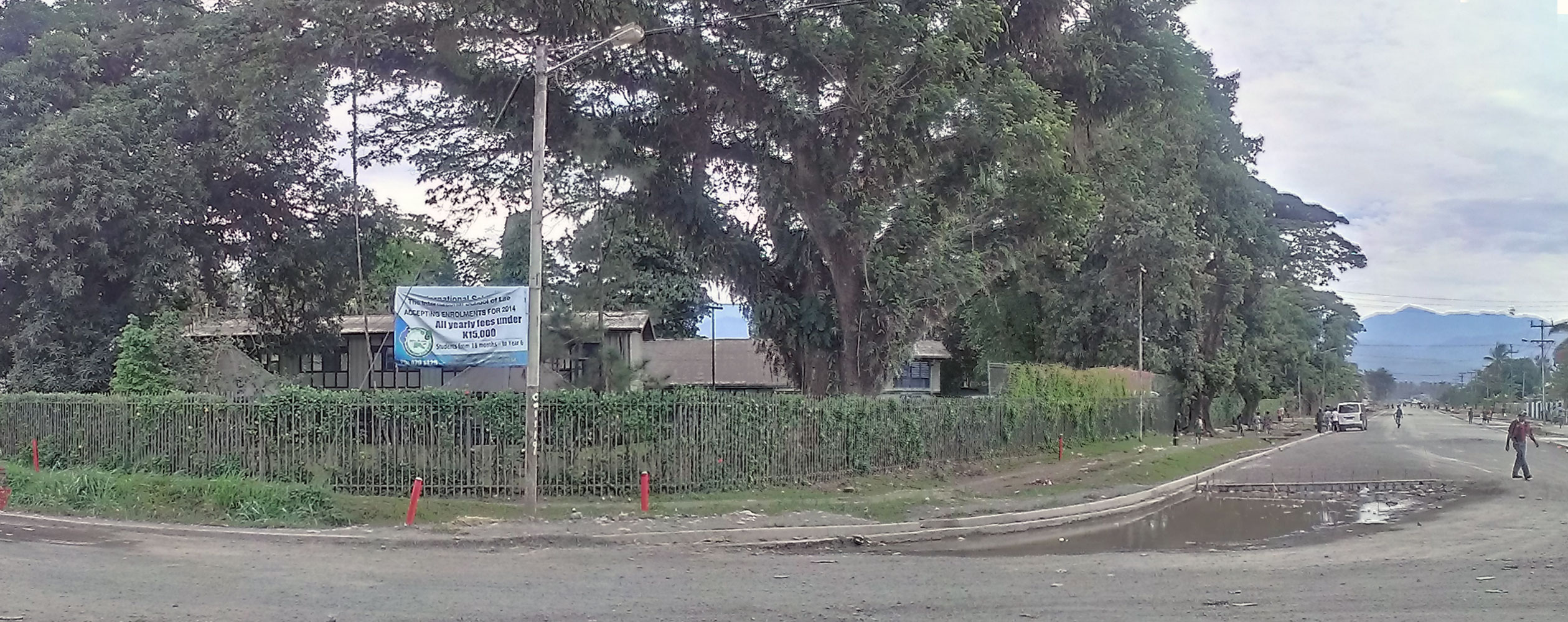
The International School of Lae, Cnr Bumbu & Houn Rd

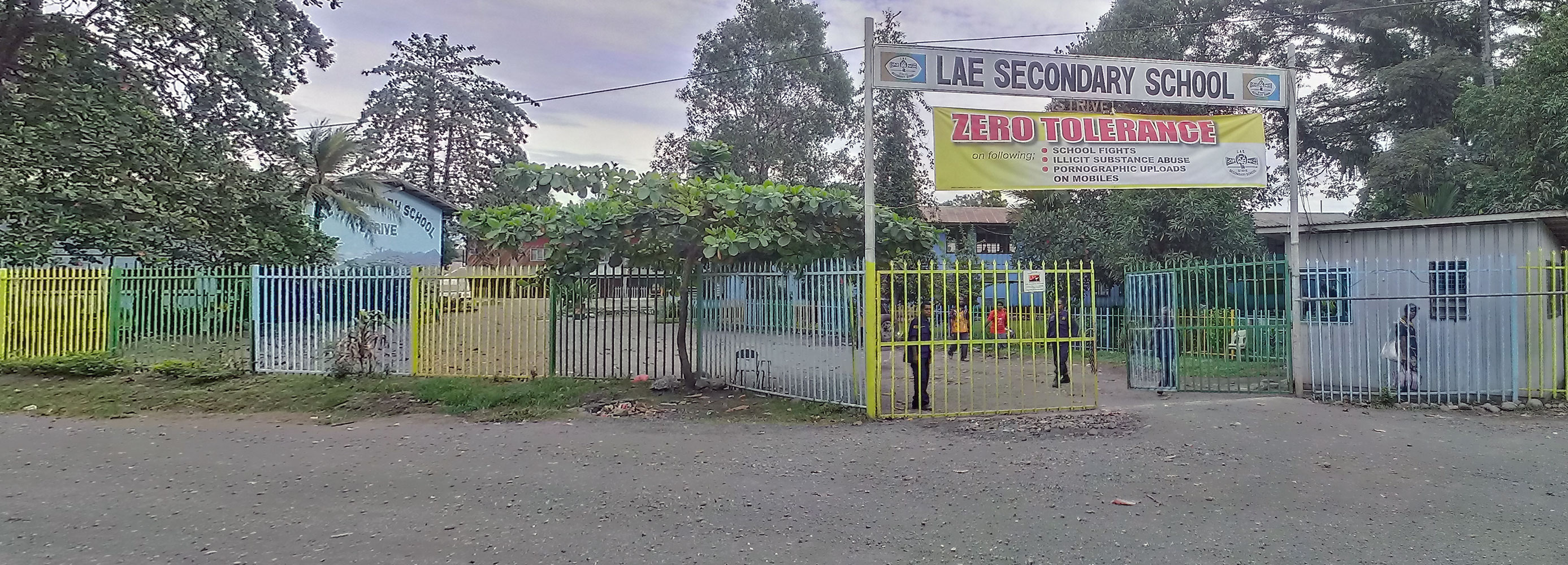
Lae Secondary (Provincial High) School, Bumbu Rd.

=== Bulae International School ===
The International School of Lae (TISOL) is located on Portion 361, Bumbu Road at the intersection of Huon Road, Eriku.

The International School of Lae is an Early Childhood to Grade 6 school in Lae, Papua New Guinea and aims to provide a culture of school life that is academically and socially positive and rewarding for students, their families and the wider community. TISOL is owned and operated by the International Education agency (IEA) of Papua New Guinea. The IEA, which operates over twenty schools throughout the country, is an independent education authority. The school is governed by an elected Board of Governors.

- Papua New Guinea Business and Tourism Directory
- Facebook Friends of TISOL

=== Lae Secondary School ===
In May 2013, students from Bugandi Secondary School and Lae Secondary School (Eriku) engaged in fighting resulting in one death and serious injury of another student

Three weeks into the 2013 school year the Lae Secondary School has introduced a zero tolerance approach towards group fights and pornography. The school is now forcing students to quit organized group fights, pornographic uploads and drug use.

=== Buk bilong Pikini Children's library ===
Buk bilong Pikinini (books for children) is an independent not-for-profit organisation based in Port Moresby, Papua New Guinea, which aims to establish children's libraries and foster a love of reading and learning. In PNG there are few functioning libraries outside the school system and most children do not have access to books at all. The purpose of Buk bilong Pikinini is to focus on early childhood learning as a key to literacy.

Buk bilong Pikinini is the brain child of Anne-Sophie Hermann who after arriving in Port Moresby in 2006 for a three-year posting with her husband, the then Australian High Commissioner, Chris Moraitis, turned the idea into a national charity.

Currently, Buk bilong Pikini has eight functioning libraries across PNG: six located in Port Moresby, one in Goroka and the last one is located on Bumbu Road, Eriku.

== Sporting facilities ==
=== Lae Golf Club ===
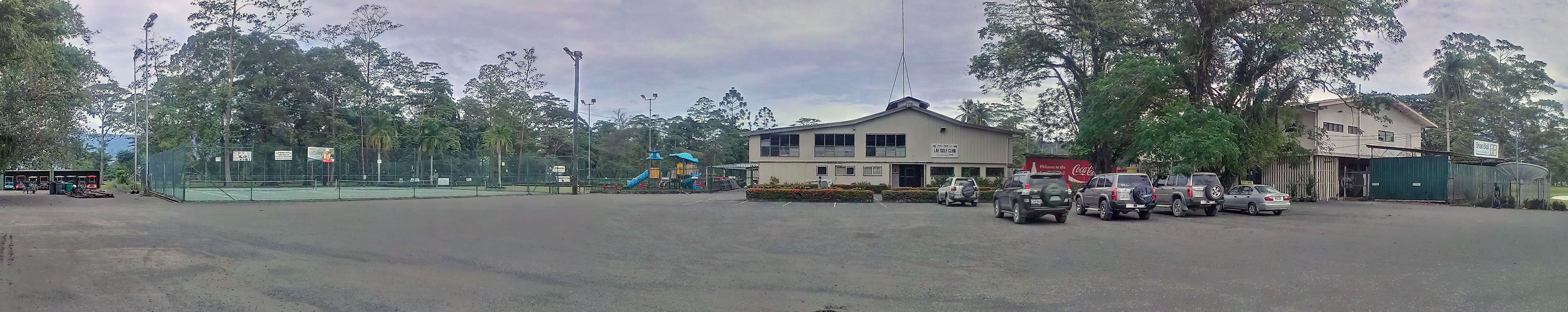
Panoramic view of Golf Club. Tennis courts to left. Chinese restaurant & Huon Club to right of photo

The Lae Golf Club was formed in 1951 on the site of a former US military ordnance depot and members played over six holes for a couple of years before another three were added. It was not until 1964 that the club created the first 18-hole layout in the country.

The annual Morobe Open is part of the North Queensland Professional Tour and is run between April and May, usually one week after the PNG Open in Port Moresby.

In 1987 the roof of the Lae Golf Club was severely attacked by termites requiring extensive renovations.

Located at the Golf Club is the Bunga Raya (Malay for Hibiscus, the flower) Chinese restaurant, which is said to be the only Chinese restaurant in Lae and the first restaurant in PNG to be "smoke-free".

=== Lae Eriku Basketball Courts ===
The Lae Basketball courts in Eriku is home to the Lae Armature Basketball Association where selections for the PNG National squad for the 2015 Pacific Games occurred in 2013.

=== Australian Rules Football ===
The Papua New Guinea National AFL team, the Mosquitos organised a practice match with the Australian Army at Eriku Oval in preparation for the 2014 International Cup in Melbourne, Australia.

The junior competition has over 25 teams with a shortage of volunteers, jumpers and footballs. The young players often "coach themselves"

Coach Jonathon Ila, who uses a wheelchair due to Duchenne muscular dystrophy, established the Sall'e Dogs junior club which fields four teams. Coach Ila was recently featured in Melbourne's The Age newspaper. The Sa'lle Dogs wear jerseys designed by Coach Ila and are the only club in Lae with their own jumpers.

=== Lae Cricket ===
The Lae Cricket nets are located at Eriku and is the home of the Lae Cricket Association.

=== Lae Bowling Club ===
Lae Bowling Club is located on 411 Huon Road, Lae and was founded in 1954.

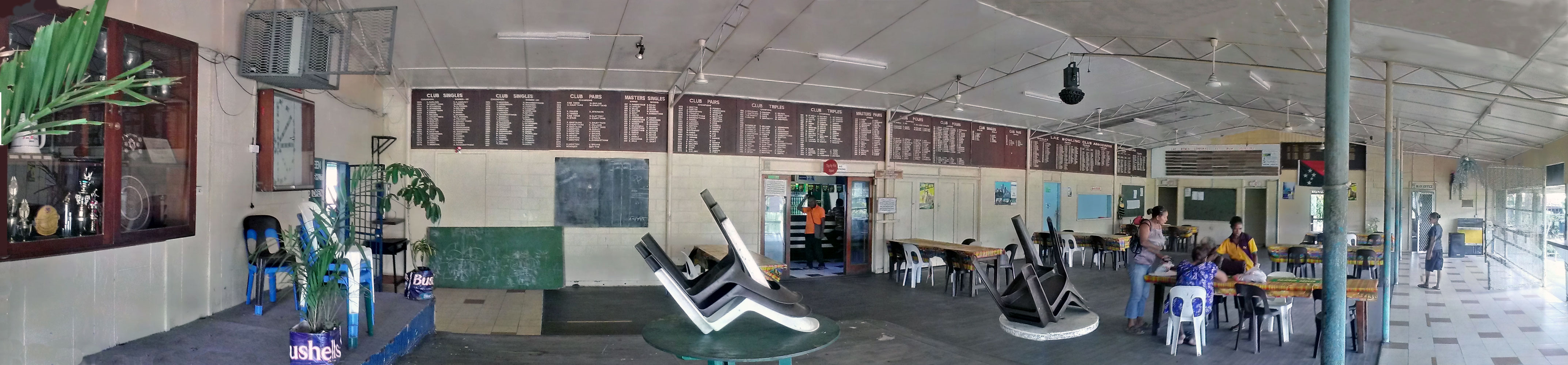
Lae Bowling Club, Huon Road, Lae
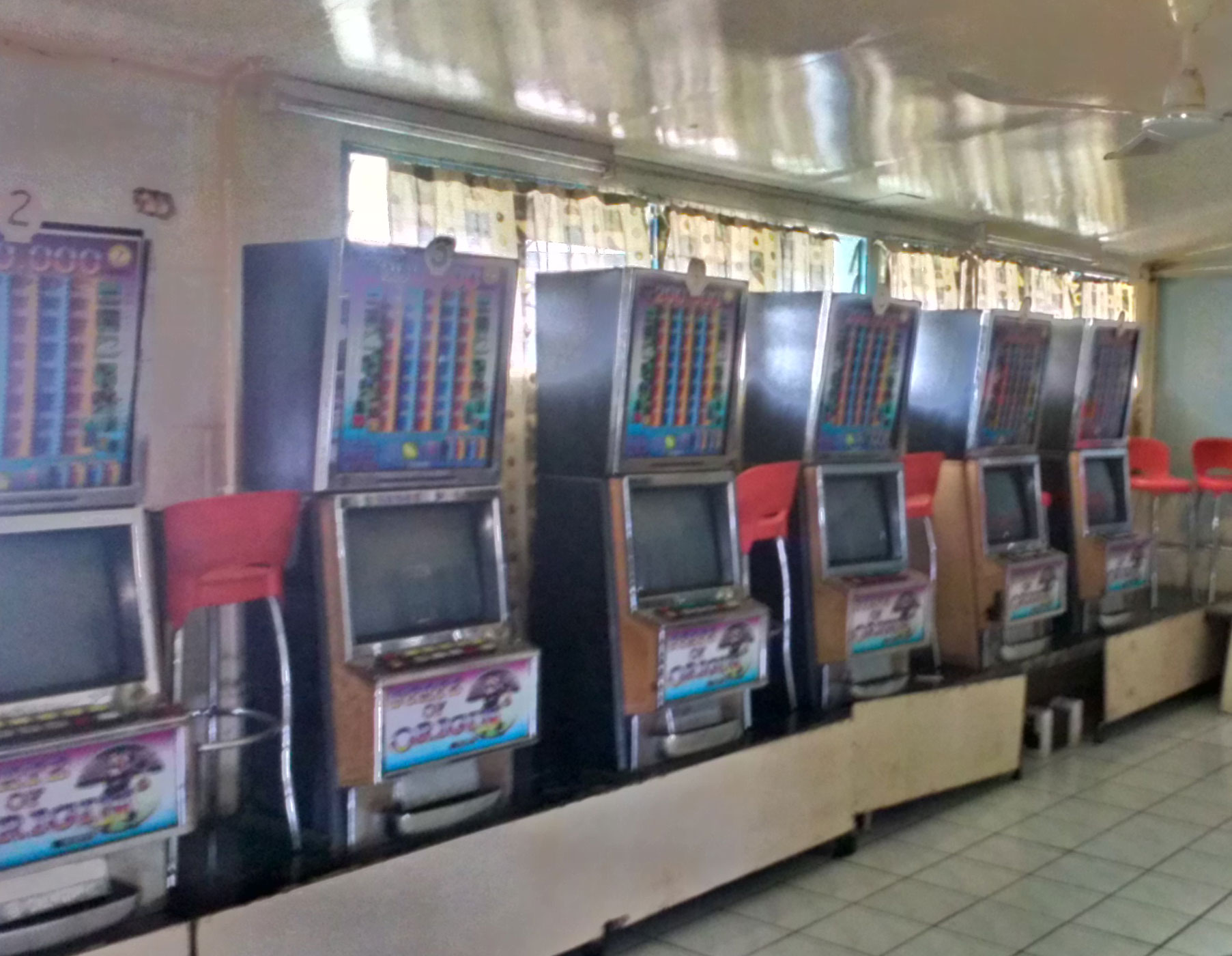
View of the Pokies Room

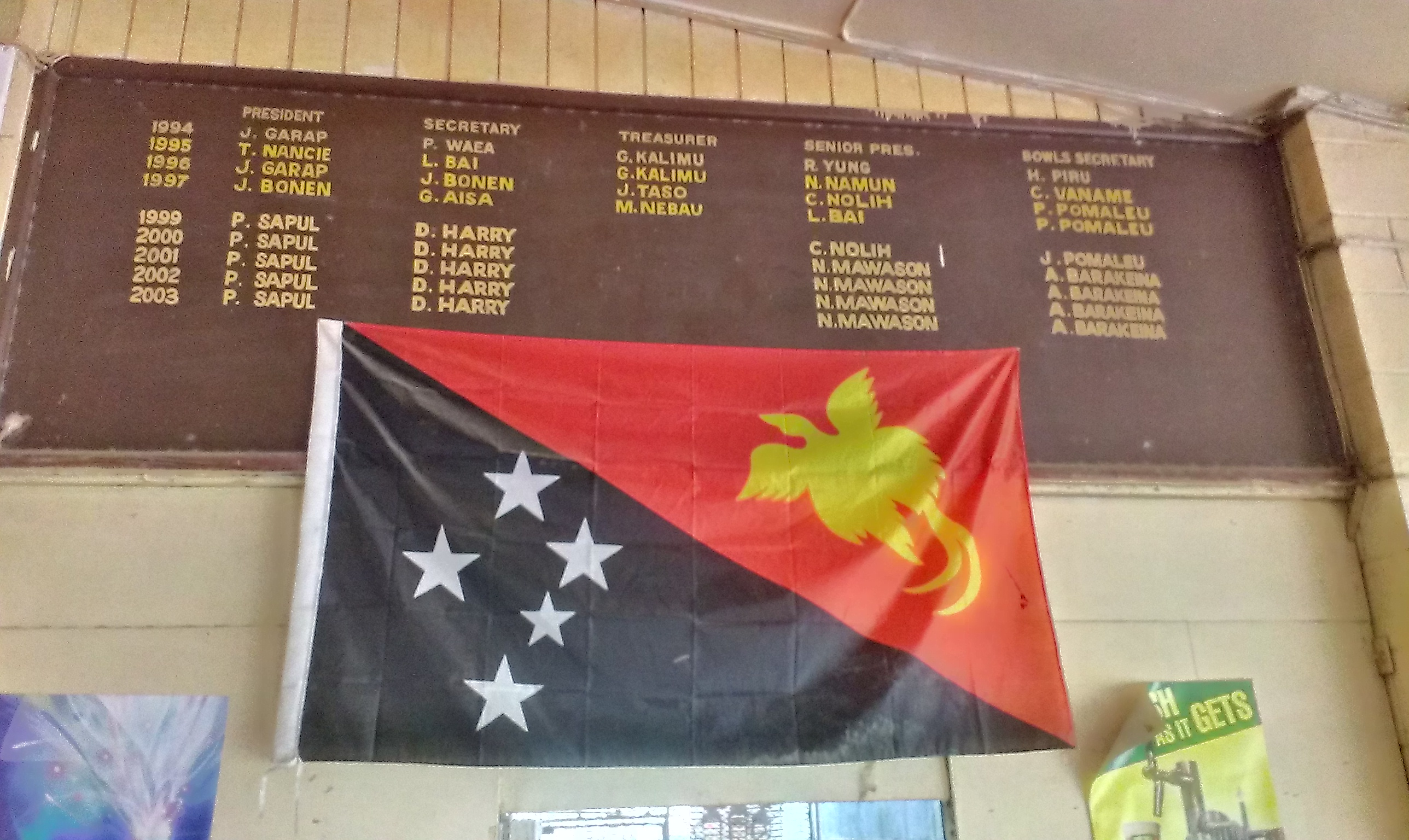
Committee Board

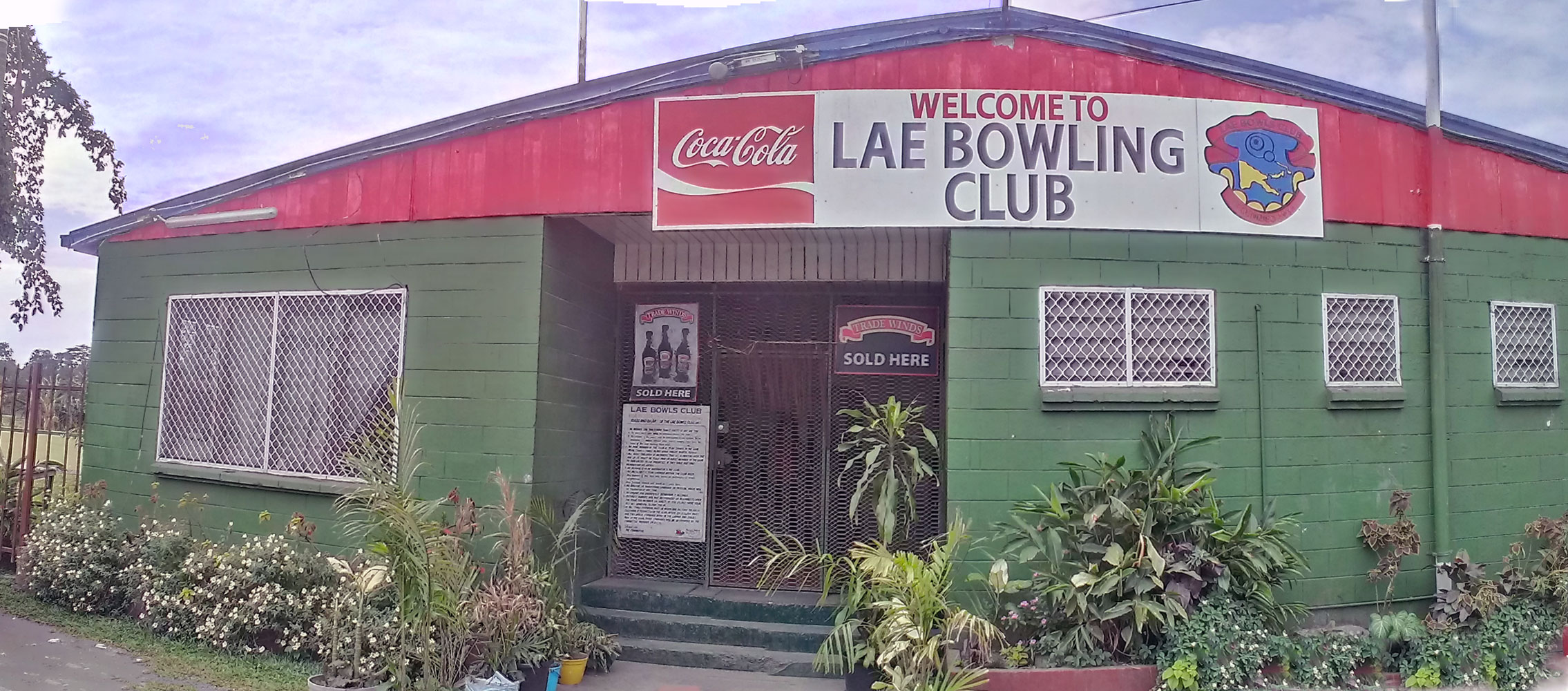
Front door

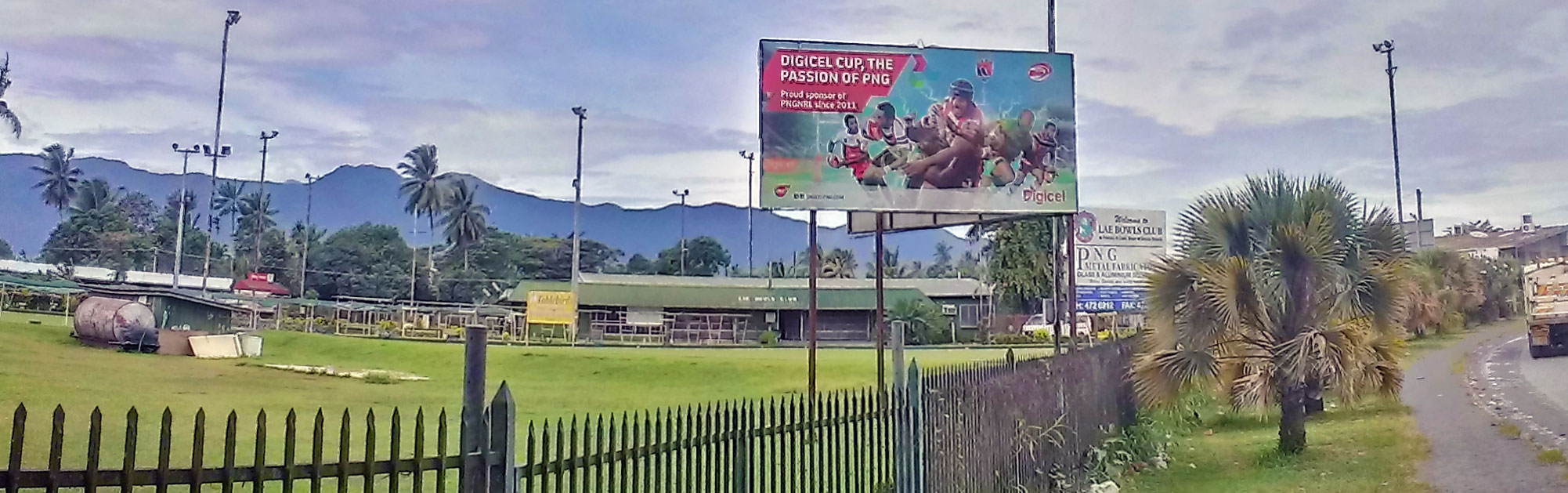
View from Huon Road
