= Omili =

- Suburb
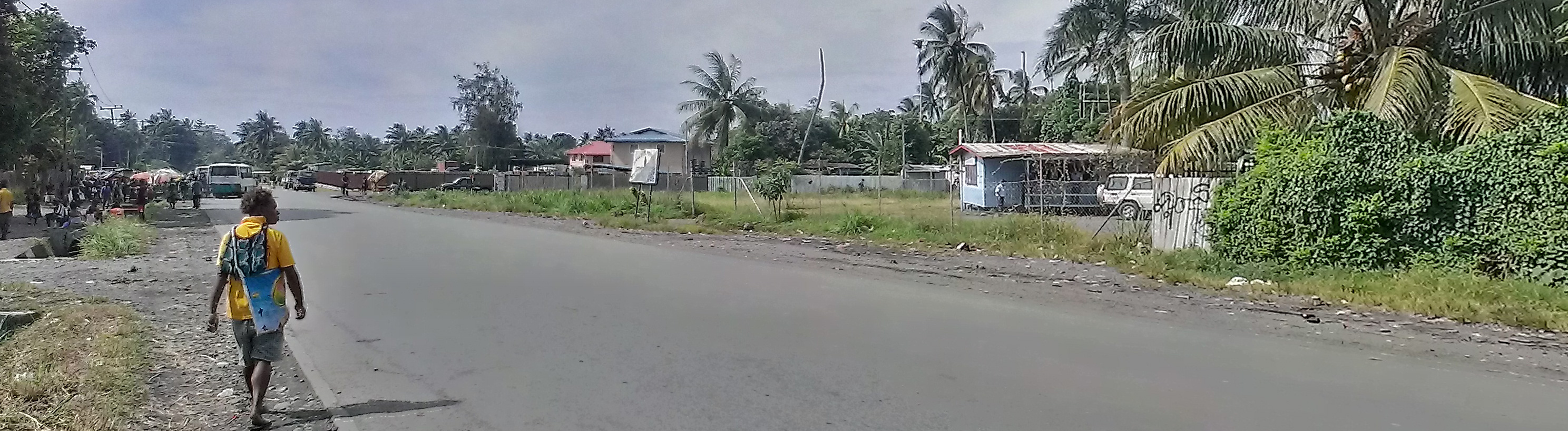
- Panoramic photo of Omili market area (left) and police station (right) on Butibum Rd

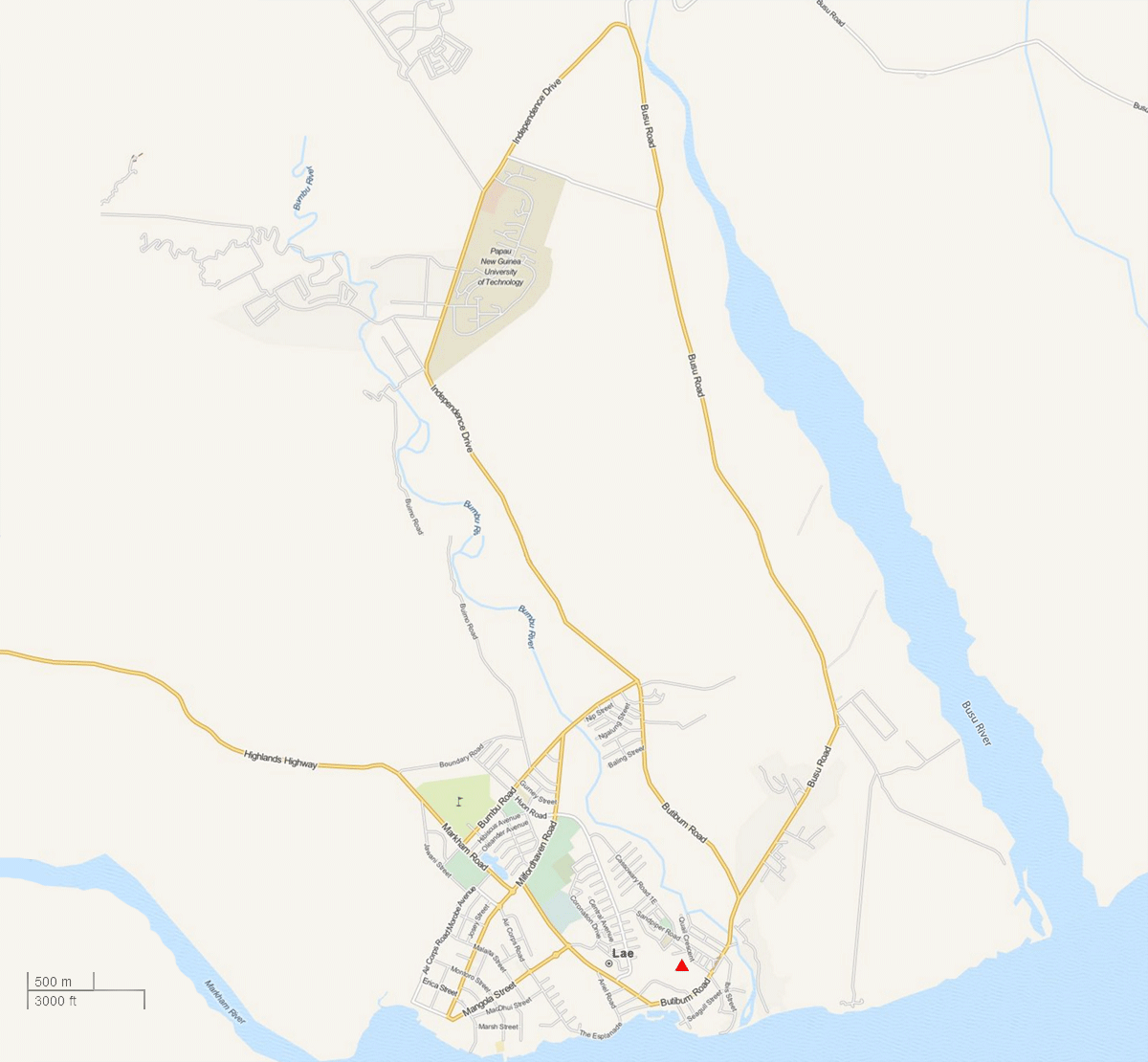
- Location in Lae
- Coordinates: 6°43′10″S 147°0′5″E
- Country: Papua New Guinea
- Province: Morobe Province
- District: Lae District
- Time zone: UTC+10 (AEST)

Omili is a suburb of Lae in the Morobe Province, Papua New Guinea.

== Location ==
Omili is located 4 km North of Lae on Butibum Road near the Bumbu River.

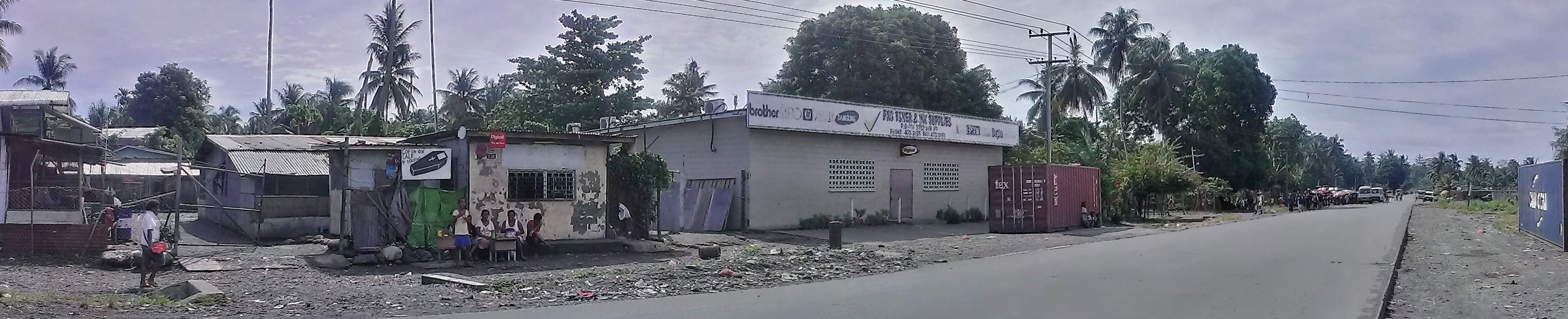
Panoramic photo of Omili shops on Butibam Rd.

== Population ==
In 1963 it was estimated that 10% of Lae's population lived in "shanty-town settlements. In the 1980 census it was estimated that the Omili settlement has expanded rapidly from 30 people in 1964 to 1786 in 1983. Both Omili and Taraka settlements have shown evidence of growing well above the average rate of Lae.

== Industry ==
In 1975, Theis Hogsberg constructed the Omili Supermarket in Ngalung Street to sell the milk and ice-cream requirements of Lae and the highlands.

In 1977 Omili was home to a well publicized industrial relations faction including the Haled Lae Miscellaneous Workers Union. The union included services such as pre-school education, film nights, housing assistance, a union taxi service and health clinic. During this period 5000 people marched in protest from Omili to the provincial offices in Lae over the use of labor.

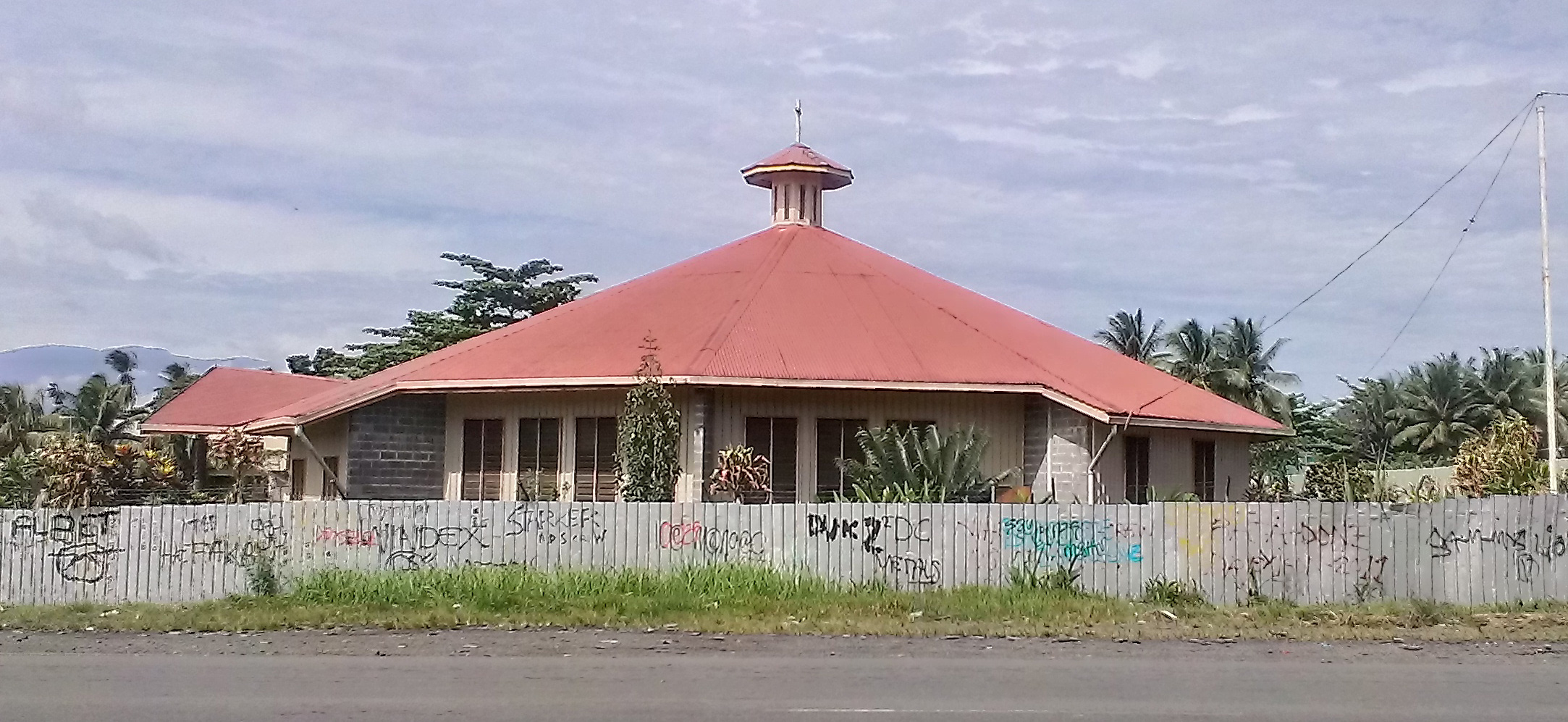
Photo of Omili church on Butibam Rd

The Tanubada Dairy facilities was located at Ngamli Street and later sold to the Joseph Kingal Ministries in 2004. Also in Omili was the Word, The Spirit and The Cross evangelistic ministries. In 2010, Joseph Kingal died and the funeral was attended by followers from all over the country.
